= Timeline of Reading, Berkshire =

Coordinates: 51.454°N 0.973°W

The following is a timeline of the history of Reading, the county town of Berkshire in England.

== Events ==
=== Early history, Normans and Medieval periods ===
- 8th century – Anglo-Saxon settlement of Britain: The settlement of "Readingum" is founded by Anglo-Saxons, probably of the Readingas tribe, at the confluence of the Rivers Thames and Kennet.
- 870 – Vikings capture Reading.
- 871 – 4 January: First Battle of Reading: Vikings defend the settlement against men of Wessex.
- 979 – Reading Nunnery is established by Queen Ælfthryth.
- 1006 – Vikings burn Reading.
- 1121 – June: Reading Abbey is founded by King Henry I. Hugh of Amiens becomes first abbot. St Laurence's Church is built alongside.
- 1125 – 29 March: A charter is granted to Reading Abbey, taken also as the founding date of Reading School.
- c.1134 – The Leper hospital is founded by Abbot Aucherius.
- 1136 – 4 or 5 January: King Henry I is buried in Reading Abbey.
- c.1140–54 – The castle is maintained at Reading by King Stephen.
- 1163 – Robert de Montford is victorious in a trial by combat against Henry of Essex held on Fry's Island before King Henry II, whose court is in residence at Reading Abbey, where the loser spends the remainder of his life as a monk.
- 1164 – Abbey church is consecrated by Thomas Becket, Archbishop of Canterbury.
- 1189 – The Hospitium of St John the Baptist is established.

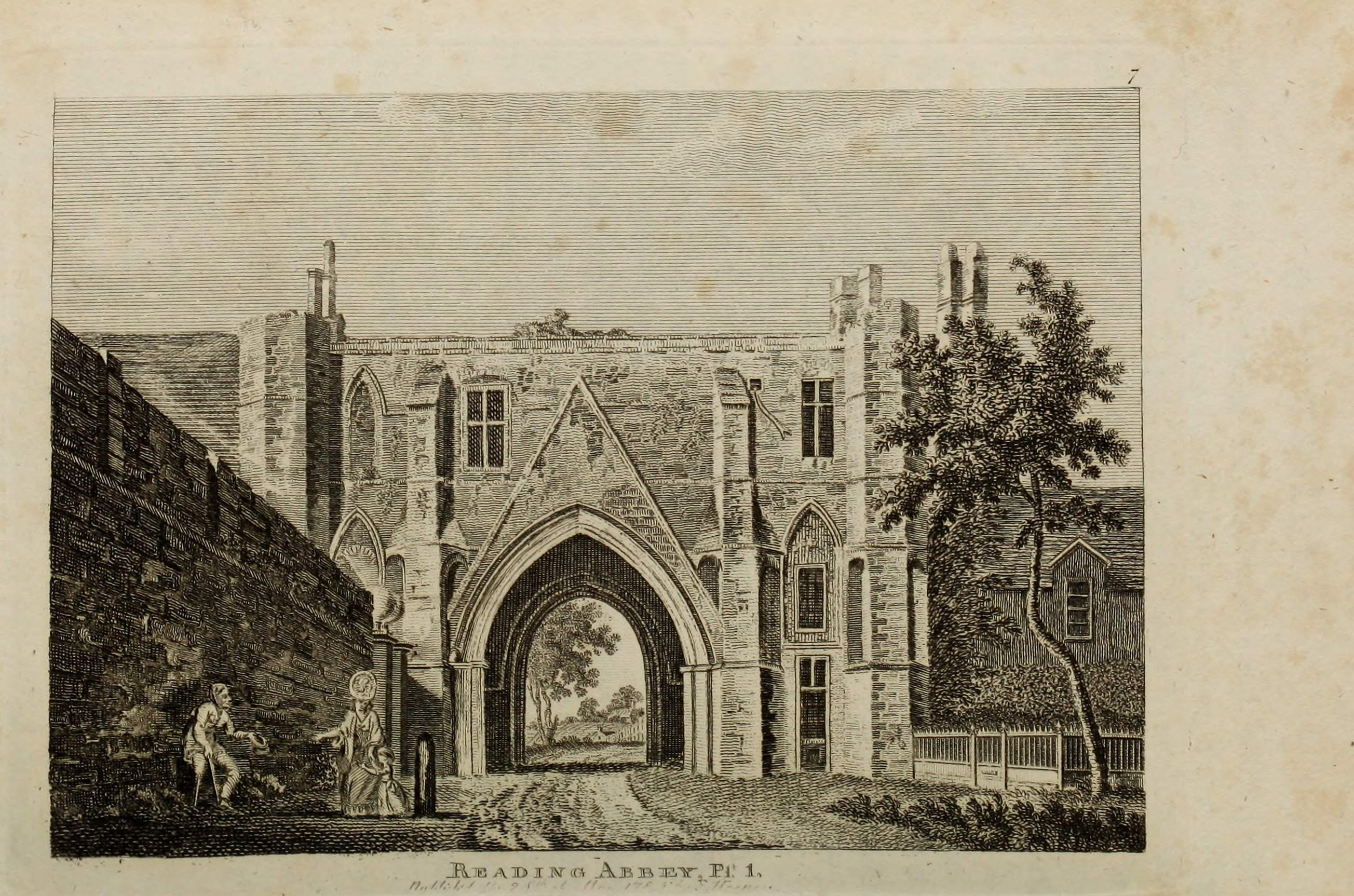
Reading Abbey gateway (in 1785)

- 1213 – Parliament is held in Reading by King John.
- 1219 – Spring: In a gathering at his home in Caversham, the dying William Marshal, 1st Earl of Pembroke, places the regency of England in the hands of the Papal legate Pandulf Verraccio.
- 1231 – 2 May: Caversham Bridge is first recorded with its Chapel of St Anne.
- 1233 – The Franciscans arrive in Reading and are granted a site near Caversham Bridge.
- 1241 – Parliament is held in Reading by King Henry III.
- 1254 – The town's first charter is granted by King Henry III, following a petition in 1253 by the Merchant guild.
- 1261–4 – The earliest known text of the "Reading Rota", "Sumer Is Icumen In", is written at Reading Abbey in mensural notation.
- 1285–1311 – The Franciscans establish a new Greyfriars.
- 1295 – As part of the Model Parliament, Reading elects two members to the Parliament of England as a parliamentary borough.
- 1346 – A tournament is held in Reading by King Edward III.
- 1359 – 19 May: John of Gaunt, the king's son marries Blanche of Lancaster in Reading Abbey.
- 1384 & 1389 – Parliament is held in Reading by King Richard II.
- 1434 – St Laurence's Church is rebuilt.
- 1440 – Parliament is held in Reading by King Henry VI.
- 1451–3 – Parliament is held at Reading Abbey by King Henry VI.
- 1463 – The election of constables is first recorded.
- 1464 – 14 September: At Reading Abbey, King Edward IV reveals his previously secret marriage to Elizabeth Woodville earlier in the year.
- 1466 – Parliament is held in Reading by King Edward IV.

=== Tudor period ===
- 1486 – Reading School is re-founded by King Henry VII on the site of St John's Hospital.
- 1487 – A new charter is granted to the town by King Henry VII.
- 1500s – The surviving houses in Castle Street are built.
- Dissolution of the Monasteries:
  - 1538
    - Greyfriars is suppressed.
    - 14 September: The Shrine of Our Lady of Caversham is destroyed.
  - 1539 – 19 September: Reading Abbey is suppressed and the Abbot, Hugh Cook Faringdon, is indicted and hanged, drawn and quartered for treason together with John Eynon, priest of St Giles', and John Rugg, on 14 November.
- 1542 – Reading is granted a royal charter of incorporation permitting the burgesses to elect the mayor. Greyfriars becomes the guildhall.
- 1548 – King Edward VI grants the lordship of Reading to his uncle, Edward Seymour, 1st Duke of Somerset and Lord Protector who in 1550 is overthrown for misdemeanors including misappropriating Abbey property.
- 1551–5 – Church of St Mary the Virgin is rebuilt with materials from the Abbey church.
- 1560 – A new charter is granted to the town by Queen Elizabeth I.
- 1566 – A civic coat of arms is granted to the town.
- 1585 – Local mathematician John Blagrave publishes The Mathematical Jewel.

=== 17th century ===
- 1619 – Wiremaking in Reading first mentioned.
- 1625 – The law courts are temporarily relocated to Reading because of plague in London.
- 1628 – The Oracle workhouse opens.
- 1634 – The original Vachel Almshouses are built as St Mary's Almshouses in St Mary's Butts.
- 1640
  - Silk manufacture in Reading begins.
  - Kings Road Baptist Church is founded.
- English Civil War:
  - 1642 – 4 November: The Royalist garrison arrives.
  - 1643 – 13–26/27 April: Siege of Reading: The Royalist garrison is forced to surrender to Parliamentarian forces. The Abbey church is severely damaged.
- 1656 – Reading Blue Coat School for boys is founded by Richard Aldworth.
- 1662 – The first nonconformist meeting in Broad Street takes place.
- 1664 – The first fire engine is active in Reading.
- c. 1671 – Quakers first meet in Reading.
- 1688
  - 9 December: Glorious Revolution: During the Second Battle of Reading, Dutch soldiers of William of Orange, with the support of townspeople, defeat an Irish garrison of James II led by Patrick Sarsfield in a skirmish in and around Broad Street. This is the last battle fought on English soil and the only substantial military action of the Revolution, and his force's success is influential in William's decision to proceed directly to London and claim the throne and in James's decision to flee the country.
  - Watlington House is built.

=== 18th century ===
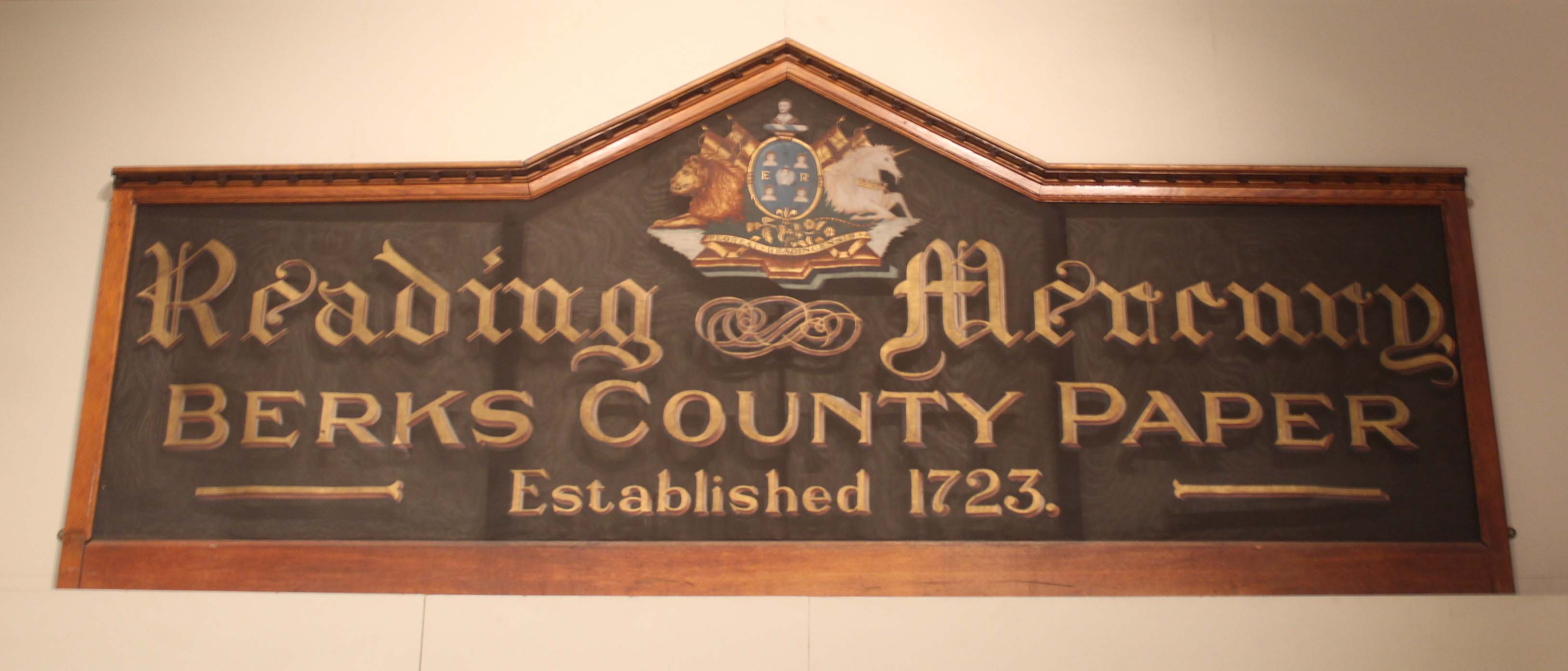
Reading Mercury sign

- 1707
  - The Presbyterian meeting house is built on Broad Street.
  - The new wooden High Bridge is erected over the River Kennet.
- 1714 – The Puntfield (Theale) turnpike trust is authorised.
- 1718–1723 – The River Kennet is made a navigation from High Bridge to Newbury by John Hore.
- 1718 – The Basingstoke turnpike trust is authorised.
- 1723 – 8 July: The Reading Mercury is the first newspaper in Reading to be published.
- 1724 – The first known freemasonry meeting in Reading takes place at the Mitre Inn.
- 1738 – Origin of the Blandy & Blandy solicitors' partnership in Reading.
- 1748 – Reading, Pennsylvania is established and named after the Berkshire town.
- 1763 – The Wallingford turnpike trust is authorised.
- 1778 – c. May: The first pound lock at Caversham Lock is constructed by Thames Navigation Commission, replacing a flash lock.
- 1782 – Green Coat school for girls is established.
- 1784 – Major Charles Marsack, lately an army officer in British India, buys Caversham Park from Earl Cadogan.
- 1785
  - 25 July: 9-year-old Jane Austen, with her sister Cassandra, begins 18 months attendance at Reading Ladies' Boarding School at the Abbey gateway.
  - The Simonds Brewery is opened by William Blackall Simonds in Broad Street.
- 1786 – The Town Hall is rebuilt; Compter Gate demolished.
- 1788 – The new stone High Bridge is erected to a design by Robert Furze Brettingham across the River Kennet.
- 1798 – St Mary's Church, Castle Street is built by a secessionist congregation (façade 1840–1842).

=== 19th century ===
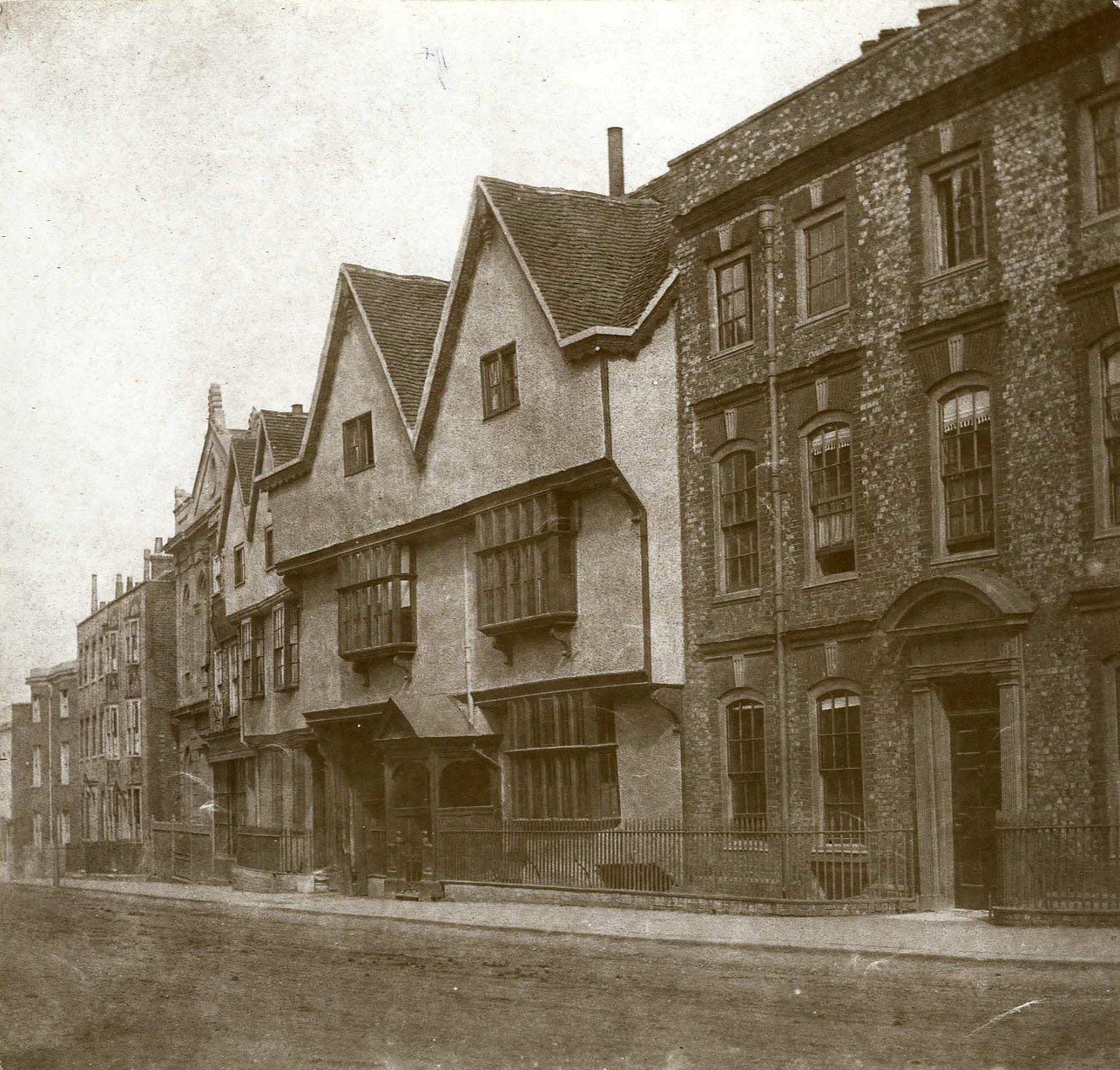
Castle Street, photographed by (or for) Henry Fox Talbot (c. 1845)

- 1800 – The streets of Reading are first lit with oil lamps, and piped water supply is first provided by a private company.
- 1802
  - Blake's Lock on the River Kennet is converted from a flash lock to a pound lock.
  - The Dispensary opens.
- 1804 – Summer: The Simeon Monument is erected in the Market Place to the design of John Soane.
- 1806 – Suttons Seeds is established as corn merchants.
- 1810 – End: Completion of the Kennet and Avon Canal provides through water communication to Bath and Bristol.
- 1813 – The first steamboat on the River Thames is recorded at Reading.
- 1814 – Simonds Bank is established.
- 1815 – The first gasworks opens in Reading on Bridge Street.
- 1819 – The streets are first lit by gas.
- 1822 – Joseph Huntley begins biscuitmaking on London Street.
- 1825 – The Reading Mechanics' Institution is first established.
- 1829 – Whilst teaching at the Castle Academy, Scottish inventor Isaac Holden develops a version of the lucifer friction match.
- 1830 – c. Autumn: Caversham Bridge is rebuilt with the Reading spans in wood and iron and the Caversham spans in stone.
- 1831 – James Dymore Brown sets up the Royal Albert Brewery.
- 1835
  - 9 September: The Municipal Corporations Act makes Reading a municipal borough with effect from 1 January 1836.
  - The Friends meeting house is built.
- 1836
  - Reading Borough Police is formed.
  - Barrett, Exall and Andrews set up the agricultural implement manufactory known from 1864 as the Reading Iron Works.
- 1837 – December: The first foundation stone is laid for a church designed by Augustus Pugin, St James's (Roman Catholic), on the site of Reading Abbey; it opens on 5 August 1840.
- 1839 – 27 May: The Royal Berkshire Hospital opens on land donated by Henry Addington, 1st Viscount Sidmouth.
- 1840 – 30 March: The Great Western Railway opens to Reading railway station from London Paddington and Twyford through Sonning Cutting and over Kennet Mouth, engineered by Isambard Kingdom Brunel. It is extended on 1 June to Steventon, and throughout to Bristol on 30 June 1841.
- 1841 – Cousins Thomas Huntley and George Palmer form the biscuitmaking partnership of Huntley & Palmers.
- 1843 – 1 May: The first interment at Reading Old Cemetery, established by the Reading Cemetery Company in 1842.
- 1844
  - Early: Henry Fox Talbot establishes a pioneering commercial photographic establishment in Reading.
  - HM Prison Reading is built as the Berkshire County Gaol to the design of George Gilbert Scott with William Bonython Moffatt.
- 1847 – 21 December: The Great Western Railway opens to Newbury and Hungerford.
- 1848 – 1 November: The Great Western Railway opens to Basingstoke.
- 1849 – 4 July: The South Eastern Railway opens to its own terminus in Reading.
- 1850 – The Board of Health is established and Reading Union Water Company begins construction of a water supply system.
- 1852 – The Reading Union Water Company completes construction of the underground Bath Road Reservoir fed from a pumping station on the Kennet at Southcote Lock and filtered on site.
- 1853 – The Theatre Royal is established in the former Mechanics' Institution on London Street.
- 1854
  - The Corn Exchange and Market House are built.
  - John Heelas opens the drapery shop which becomes the Heelas department store.
- 1856
  - 23 March: Forbury Gardens, laid out with a "botanical character", are opened to the public by the corporation.
  - 9 July: The London and South Western Railway begins services to Reading.
- 1860 – The Art School opens.
- 1861 – The Assize Courts and police station are built.
- 1862 – The Reading Gas Company is formed by a merger.
- 1863 – Greyfriars Church is restored as a place of worship.
- 1866
  - All Saints' Church is opened for worship.
  - New workhouse established.
- 1868
  - July: The Summer assize for Berkshire is moved from Abingdon to Reading, effectively making the latter the county town. This is officially confirmed in 1869.
  - The Bath Road Reservoir is acquired by the Borough Council from the Reading Union Water Company.
- 1869 – 24 July: Caversham Bridge reopens after being rebuilt in metal.
- c. 1870–1873 – The water turbine powered sewage pumping station is installed at Blake's Lock as part of a sewerage and sewage treatment scheme.
- 1871 – 25 December: Reading F.C. is founded as an Association football club.
- 1872 – Huntley, Boorne & Stevens absorbs the biscuit tin manufacturing business established in 1832 by Joseph Huntley. In 1918 it is bought by Huntley & Palmers.
- 1875
  - Caversham Lock is rebuilt.
  - The Free Library opens.
  - 17 December: Edward Jackson establishes his gentleman's outfitters, which moves to Jacksons Corner in 1885.
- 1877 – Kendrick School is established for girls in Watlington House.
- 1879 – January–May: The Reading Tramways Company horse-drawn network is constructed.
- 1880 – The Reading Gas Company bridge over River Kennet is constructed.
- 1881 – Brock Barracks is completed.
- 1882 – October: The new Free Library opens in the Town Hall.
- 1884 – The Maiwand Lion, sculpted by George Blackall Simonds, is erected in Forbury Gardens as a war memorial to men of the 66th (Berkshire) Regiment of Foot killed at the Battle of Maiwand and elsewhere in the Second Anglo-Afghan War.
- 1885 – The Reading Parliamentary constituency is reduced to one member.
- 1887 – 20 June: As part of Queen Victoria's golden jubilee, a commemorative statue of her is erected in the town.
- 1889
  - 1 April: Reading becomes a county borough under the Local Government Act 1888, and its boundaries are enlarged.
  - Leslie Randall is appointed as the first Suffragan Bishop of Reading and serves until 1909.
- 1891 – Palmer Park opens.
- 1892
  - c. March: Horseshoe Bridge for Thames towing horses is erected at the Kennet Mouth by the Great Western Railway Company to replace the ferry.
  - 29 September: The Reading University Extension College, predecessor of the University of Reading, is established, with Halford Mackinder as the first president.
- 1895 – 20 November: Oscar Wilde is transferred to Reading Gaol where he is held until 18 May 1897.
- 1896
  - 4 April: Amelia Dyer is arrested and subsequently hanged for the murder of a baby placed in her care. This is only one of between seven and twenty probably killed by her since moving to the Reading area the previous year.
  - 7 July: Charles Thomas Wooldridge is hanged at Reading Gaol for uxoricide, inspiring fellow-prisoner C.3.3. Oscar Wilde's The Ballad of Reading Gaol.
  - 5 September: Reading F.C. play their first match at Elm Park.
  - The new water pumping station for the town at Fobney Lock begins operation.
- 1897 – The Reading Museum opens on the site of Reading School house; it houses an 1885–1886 replica of the Bayeux Tapestry purchased by Arthur Hill for the town in 1895.
- 1898 – June: Reading R.F.C. are founded as Berkshire Wanderers; they play their first match in September.

=== 20th century ===
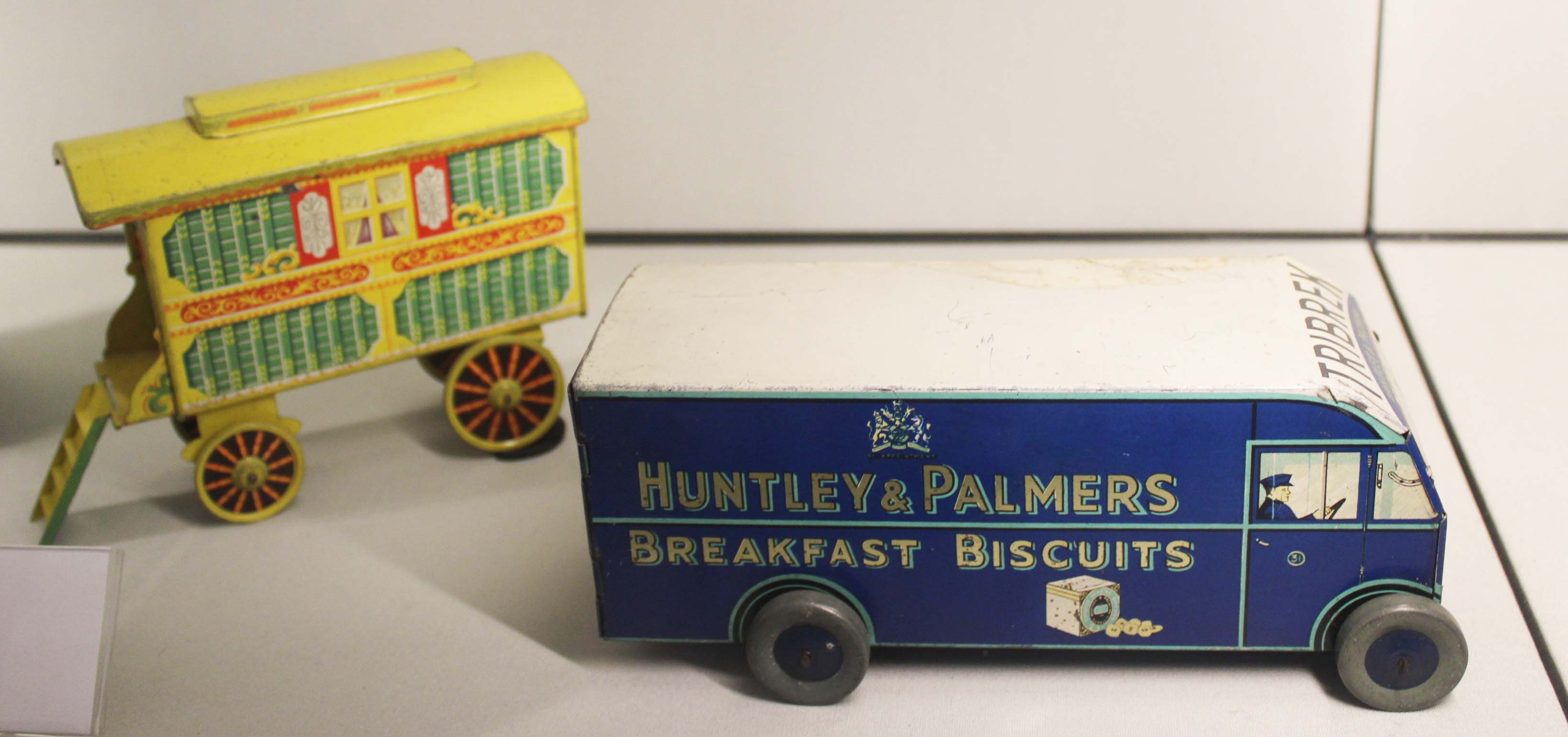
Novelty biscuit tins (c. 1937)

- 1901
  - The British manufacture of the Pulsometer pump moves from London to Reading.
  - The Synagogue is built.
  - Reading's population is 72,217.
- 1902 – 9 August: The Coronation of King Edward VII takes place, and a commemorative statue of him is erected in the town by the Sutton family.
- 1903–1955 – McIlroy's department store is in business.
- 1903 – 22 July: The Reading Corporation Tramways opens its first electric service with its own generating station.
- 1909 – The first cinema in Reading opens.
- 1911 – Caversham becomes part of the county borough of Reading.
- 1914
  - The Jewish lawyer Rufus Isaacs, who has been the M.P. for Reading since 1904, becomes the first Baron Reading.
  - Belgian refugees arrive in Reading.
- 1916
  - January: War Hospitals Supply Depot, which is largely staffed by volunteer women, begins operation in Reading.
  - Reading Gaol is used for the detention of aliens and (from July) Irish republicans detained following the Easter Rising; the latter include Arthur Griffith (founder of Sinn Féin) and poets Terence MacSwiney and Darrell Figgis. Many of the Irish are released on 24 December.
- 1919 – Reading Corporation Tramways operates its first motor buses, from Caversham Heights to Tilehurst.
- 1920
  - June – A historical pageant takes place in the Abbey grounds.
  - The first council houses are built.
- 1921 – 13 September: The Royal Berkshire Regiment War Memorial at Brock Barracks is unveiled.
- 1922 – The Oratory School, a Roman Catholic boys' institution, moves from Edgbaston, Birmingham, to Caversham Park.
- 1923 – 3 October: Reading Bridge, designed in reinforced concrete by L. G. Mouchel, opens across the River Thames.
- 1926
  - 17 March: The University of Reading is chartered, making it the only institution to be newly granted full university status in the U.K. in the interwar period.
  - April: The new Caversham Bridge, designed in reinforced concrete by L. G. Mouchel, opens across the River Thames, with official inauguration taking place on 25 June.
  - The Church of The English Martyrs (Roman Catholic), designed by Wilfred C. Mangan, is completed.
- 1929 – Easter: Reading Aerodrome opens at Woodley.
- 1932
  - 27 July: The war memorial to men of Reading and Berkshire is unveiled at the entrance to Forbury Gardens.
  - Reading Crematorium is established in Caversham.
  - Tilehurst Water Tower is erected.
- 1933 – 29 March: The Miles Hawk aircraft first flies from Woodley Aerodrome.
- 1936 – 18 July: Trolleybuses in Reading begin operation.
- 1939 – 20 November: Reading Corporation Tramways close.
- 1942
  - 2 May: The Suffragan office of Bishop of Reading is revived, with Arthur Parham being consecrated.
  - 6 May: The Oratory School moves to Woodcote House.
- 1943
  - 10 February: Luftwaffe air raid on Reading, in which 41 people are killed.
  - Spring: The BBC Monitoring Service moves to Caversham Park from Wood Norton, Worcestershire. It leaves in May 2018.
- 1945
  - 1 May: The BBC Monitoring Service at Caversham Park is the first place in the U.K. to hear of the death of Adolf Hitler, which will lead to the end of World War II in Europe on 7 May.
  - The Reading Festival Chorus is formed.
- 1946 – The Progress Theatre is formed.
- 1947
  - The University of Reading purchases Whiteknights Park to develop a new campus.
  - Reading is twinned with Düsseldorf, Germany, which is made official in 1988.
  - Huntley & Palmers produce the cake for the November wedding of Princess Elizabeth and Philip Mountbatten, Duke of Edinburgh.
  - The River Thames floods 1600 homes.
- 1950 – Work begins on the council's Southcote housing estate.
- 1951 – Later: The Museum of English Rural Life is established at the university; it opens to the public on 27 April 1955.
- 1953 – February: The Progress Theatre give the first British English-language performance of Brecht's The Good Woman of Setzuan.
- 1955
  - Migrants from the Caribbean settle in Reading.
  - Reading College opens as Reading Technical College.
- 1958
  - 7 April: The first protest march for the Campaign for Nuclear Disarmament from London to Aldermaston, to demand a ban on nuclear weapons, passes through Reading.
  - Spring: The Progress Theatre give the first performance in England of Seán O'Casey's 1923 play The Shadow of a Gunman.
  - The first Little Chef diner is opened in Oxford Road by Sam Alper.
- 1960 – The town's first high-rise council flats are built in Coley Park.
- 1961 – The Civic Society is formed.
- 1964 – Bulmershe College opens.
- 1965 – The Prudential assurance company opens administrative offices at The Forbury.
- 1966
  - The last Tilehurst brickworks, S. & E. Collier, closes.
  - c. December: The multi-storey car park Yield Hall opens.
- 1967
  - Western Tower is completed as railway offices, making it the first major office tower in Reading.
  - Brian Brindley becomes the vicar of Holy Trinity Church, which he transforms into a centre of Anglo-Catholicism.
- 1968 – 3 November: Trolleybuses in Reading stop operating.
- 1969–1989 – The Inner Distributor Road opens.
- 1969 – 1 April: The Reading Borough Police is merged into Thames Valley Police.
- 1971
  - 25–27 June: The first Reading Festival "of jazz and progressive music" takes place.
  - Friars Walk Shopping Centre opens, and Broad Street Mall opens as the Butts Centre.
- 1974
  - 1 April: Reorganisation under Local Government Act 1972 takes effect, and The County Borough of Reading becomes an administrative district of Berkshire.
  - 3 April–26 June: The Family, an early U.K. example of a fly on the wall documentary series featuring the Wilkins of Reading, airs nationally on BBC1 television.
- 1976
  - 8 March: The first local radio station, Radio 210, begins broadcasting.
  - Huntley & Palmers cease biscuit manufacture in Reading.
  - Suttons Seeds move to Torbay.
  - The new civic offices are completed.
- 1977 – The Hexagon concert/performance venue is completed.
- 1984 – American screen actor Stacy Keach serves 6 months in HM Prison Reading for possession of cocaine at Heathrow Airport.
- 1985 – New Central Library is built.
- 1988
  - 27 March: Reading F.C. win the Simod Cup, but are relegated to the Football League Third Division.
  - Rivermead Leisure Centre opens.
- 1989 – The merger of Bulmershe College of Higher Education into the University of Reading is completed.
- 1990–2006 – The main annual U.K. World of Music, Arts and Dance (WOMAD) festival is held in Rivermead.
- 1990 – 8 August: The Kennet and Avon Canal is officially reopened throughout as a leisure waterway.
- 1994
  - 10 February: The Church of England (Continuing) is founded at St Mary's Church, Castle Street.
  - Reading is twinned with Clonmel, Republic of Ireland and San Francisco Libre, Nicaragua.
- 1995 – The Broad Street shopping area is pedestrianised.
- 1997 – 17 June: The Reading Rockets basketball club is formed.
- 1998
  - 1 April: Berkshire County Council is abolished and the Borough of Reading becomes one of the unitary authorities in the area.
  - 22 August: Reading F.C. play their first match at the Madejski Stadium.
- 1999
  - February: Green Park Business Park is opened by the Prudential, initially with Cisco Systems as main tenant.
  - 23 September: The Oracle shopping mall is opened on the site of the Oracle workhouse.
  - The Church of St Mary the Virgin is raised to the honorific dignity of Reading Minster.

=== 21st century ===
- 2003
  - Reading is twinned with Speightstown, Barbados.
  - The first gay pride march in Reading takes place.
- 2004 – Reading College and School of Arts and Design is affiliated to Thames Valley University.
- 2005
  - 7 May: The Murder of Mary-Ann Leneghan takes place.
  - November: The Green Park wind turbine is completed.
- 2006 – Reading F.C. open their first season in the Premier League.
- 2010 – March: Scottish Courage's Berkshire Brewery at Worton Grange, successor to the Simonds Brewery in 1979/80, ceases production.
- 2013
  - September: UTC Reading, a university technical college, opens.
  - November: HM Prison Reading closes.
  - December: Jackson's outfitters closes; the premises are refurbished for residential use in the following decade.
- 2014 – 17 July: The substantially rebuilt Reading railway station is officially reopened, upgraded in anticipation of electrification work and the opening of the Elizabeth line.
- 2015 – 30 September: Christchurch Bridge opens as a pedestrian and cycle crossing over the River Thames.
- 2017
  - 30 January: Four former bank employees are convicted for their part in the HBOS Reading branch fraud.
  - The digital station RG2 Radio is established to serve primarily the local Afro-Caribbean community.
- 2018
  - 2 January: The electrification of Reading station is completed, with the first electric trains running between London Paddington and Didcot Parkway.
  - 15 December: Reading station is connected to the Elizabeth Line network under the name TfL Rail.
- 2019 –19 November: Olivia Graham is the first female consecrated Suffragan Bishop of Reading.
- 2020
  - 23 March: Reading enters the national lockdown cycle caused by the COVID-19 pandemic in the United Kingdom.
  - 20 June: 2020 Reading stabbings: Three people are killed in a mass stabbing in Forbury Gardens.
- 2021
  - COVID-19 pandemic in the United Kingdom continues.
  - Autumn: Reading Rep Theatre opens in a permanent venue converted from a Salvation Army hall.
- 2022
  - 6 November: Elizabeth line begins 4 trains per hour running from Reading to Abbey Wood.
  - 4 December: Research at University of Reading shows that trust in food authorities, such as government and food regulators, has fallen due to COVID-19.
  - 6 December: According to the 2022/23 People & Planet University League, the University of Reading has been ranked as the fourth greenest university in the UK.
- 2023 – 27 May: Reading Green Park railway station opens to serve the Green Park business area and the Madejski Stadium, as well as the proposed Green Park Village residential development. Refurbishment of Reading West railway station is also completed during the year.

== Births ==
- c. 1492 – Thomas White, cloth merchant, Lord Mayor of London and benefactor (d. 1567)
- 1573
  - 7 October: William Laud, Archbishop of Canterbury (executed 1645)
  - John Kendrick, cloth merchant and benefactor (d. 1624)
- 1718 – 12 December: John Cennick, evangelical preacher (d. 1755)
- 1759 – 24 September: Charles Simeon, evangelical preacher (d. 1836)
- 1795 – 26 May: Thomas Talfourd, lawyer, politician and author (d. 1854)
- 1843 – 6 October: George Blackall Simonds, sculptor (d. 1929)
- 1858 – 19 June: George Alexander, actor-manager (d. 1918)
- 1869 – 23 December: Hugh Allen, conductor (d. 1946)
- 1884 – 18 August: Basil Cameron, conductor (d. 1975)
- 1886 – 14 January: Hugh Lofting, children's author, creator of Doctor Dolittle (d. 1947)
- 1892 – 18 December: Fred Potts, trooper, recipient of the Victoria Cross (d. 1943)
- 1903 – 29 March: Arthur Negus, antiques expert (d. 1985)
- 1906 – 18 December: Evelyn Dunbar, war artist (d. 1960)
- 1912 – 3 July: Elizabeth Taylor, novelist (d. 1975)
- 1918 – 4 July: Alex Bedser, cricketer (d. 2010)
- 1929 – 31 December: Peter May, cricketer (d. 1994)
- 1930 – 24 November: Ken Barrington, cricketer (d. 1981)
- 1932 – 24 October: Cormac Murphy-O'Connor, Cardinal Archbishop of Westminster (d. 2017)
- 1943 – 14 May: Richard Peto, epidemiologist
- 1953 – 15 May: Mike Oldfield, musician
- 1961 – 25 June: Ricky Gervais, comedian
- 1963 – Bob and Roberta Smith (Patrick Brill), slogan painter
- 1965 – 1 August: Sam Mendes, film and theatre director
- 1966 – 31 August: Alice Oswald, poet
- 1973 – 18 December: Lucy Worsley, historian
- 1975 – 5 October: Kate Winslet, film actress
- 1977
  - 23 April: Babita Sharma, radio journalist
  - 28 September: John Finnemore, comedy scriptwriter-performer
- 1982 – 9 January: Kate Middleton, royal consort
- 1983 – 6 September: Pippa Middleton, socialite
- 1992 – 17 March: Eliza Bennett, actress
- 1993 – 29 June: Fran Kirby, footballer

== See also ==
- Oxford, Portsmouth, and Southampton

== Bibliography ==
- "Reading (England)" . Encyclopædia Britannica. Vol. 22 (11th ed.). 1910. pp. 939–940.
