= History of Reading, Berkshire =

Occupation at the site of Reading may date back to the Roman period, possibly as either a trading port on the River Thames, or as an intersection on the Roman road connecting London with Calleva Atrebatum near Silchester.

== Origins ==
The first evidence for Reading as a settlement dates from the 8th century, where the town came to be known as Readingum. The name comes from the Readingas, an Anglo-Saxon tribe whose name means "Reada's People" in Old English. The name Reada is thought to literally mean "The Red One."

In late 870 an army of Danes invaded the then kingdom of Wessex and set up camp at Reading. On 4 January 871, the first Battle of Reading took place, when an army led by King Ethelred and his brother Alfred the Great attempted unsuccessfully to breach the Danes' defences. The battle is described in the Anglo-Saxon Chronicle, and this account provides the earliest known written record of the existence of the town of Reading. The Danes remained in Reading until late in 871, when they retreated to winter quarters in London.

After the Battle of Hastings and the Norman Conquest of England, William the Conqueror gave land in and around Reading to his foundation of Battle Abbey. In its 1086 Domesday Book listing, the town was explicitly described as a borough. The presence of six mills is recorded, with four on land belonging to the king and two on the land given to Battle Abbey.

== Time of the Abbey ==
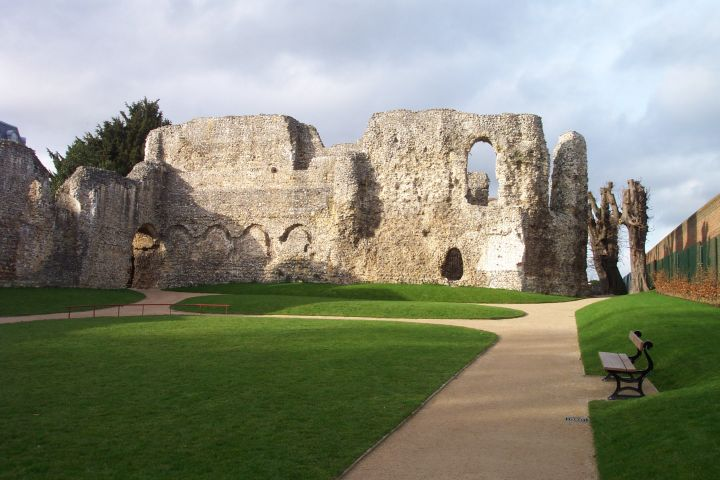
Reading Abbey

Reading Abbey was founded by Henry I in 1121, and he is buried within the Abbey grounds. As part of his endowments, he gave the abbey his lands within Reading, along with land at Cholsey. He also arranged for the land previously owned by Battle Abbey to be transferred to Reading Abbey, in return for some of his land at Appledram in Sussex.

The foundation of Reading Abbey led to the town becoming a place of pilgrimage and enhanced the town's prosperity. However the relationship between already established borough's burgesses and the Abbey was to prove strained at times. In 1253 Reading's Merchant Guild successfully petitioned for the grant of a charter from the King and negotiated a division of authority with the Abbey. However disputes continued over the Abbey's powers to raise taxes and appoint the Guild's officers. Even the title of the Guild's first officer was open to dispute, with the Guild and, on occasion, the King referring to him as the Mayor, whilst the Abbey continued to call him the Guild Warden. In 1312, King Edward II directed that its bridges should be kept in good order.

It is not known exactly how badly Reading was affected by the Black Death that swept through England in the 14th century. But it is known that the abbot of Reading Abbey, Henry of Appleford, was one of its victims in 1361, and that nearby Henley lost 60% of its population.

In 1487, Henry VII granted a further charter that went further than previous charters, although still leaving the appointment of the Mayor/Warden in the hands of the Abbey. This charter, and a subsequent judicial arbitration in 1499, confirmed the Guild as a body corporate in perpetuity.

== Dissolution and war ==
The Abbey was largely destroyed in 1538 during Henry VIII's dissolution of the monasteries. The last abbot, Hugh Cook Faringdon, was subsequently tried and convicted of high treason and hanged, drawn and quartered in front of the Abbey Church. The dissolution initially saw the Mayor appointed by the King's officers administering the dismemberment of the abbey properties. However, in 1542 Henry VIII granted the Guild a new charter that permitted the burgesses to elect the Mayor.

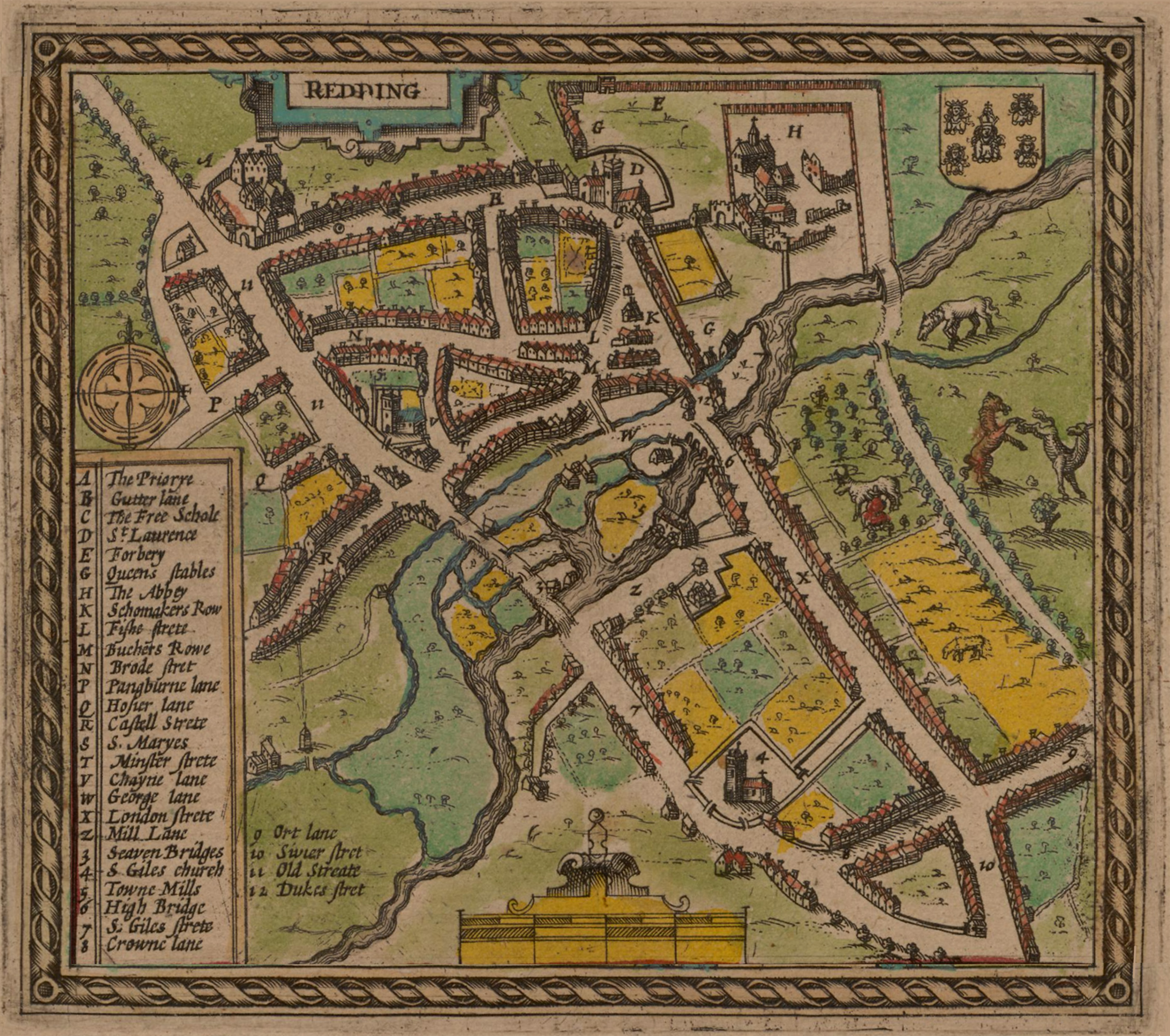
The earliest map of Reading, published in 1611 by John Speed.

By 1525, Reading was the largest town in Berkshire, and tax returns show that Reading was the 10th largest town in England followed closely by Colchester and Leicester, based on taxable wealth. By 1611, Reading had a population of over 5000 and had grown rich on its trade in cloth, as instanced by the fortune made by local merchant John Kendrick. At this time, Reading had mostly traditional timber-framed houses, a few examples of which still exist in Castle Street, Market Place and other places. Often the front ground floor of the house was given over to retail activities, with family and lodgers living in the rooms behind and above.

The town played an important role during the English Civil War; it changed hands a number of times. Despite its fortifications, it had a Royalist garrison imposed on it in 1642. The subsequent Siege of Reading by the Parliamentary forces succeeded in April 1643. However, the taxes levied by the various parties left Berkshire 'in a miserable condition, hardly a sheep, hen, hog, oats, wheat, or any other thing for man or beast to feed upon.' The town's cloth trade was especially badly damaged, and the town's economy did not fully recover until the 20th century.

Reading played a significant role during the Revolution of 1688, with the second Battle of Reading being the only substantial military action of the campaign. James II had stationed an advance guard of 600, largely Irish, troops in Reading to stop the march of William's army towards London. Seeing these troops as an occupying force, the people of Reading requested help from William, informing him of the Royalist positions in the town. As a result, a relief force of about 250 troops attacked from an unexpected direction, and forced the Irish troops to abandon the town. This defeat of James' troops by an inferior force, together with the willingness of the people of Reading to support William, convinced James of the insecurity of his position and he fled the country.

== 18th century ==
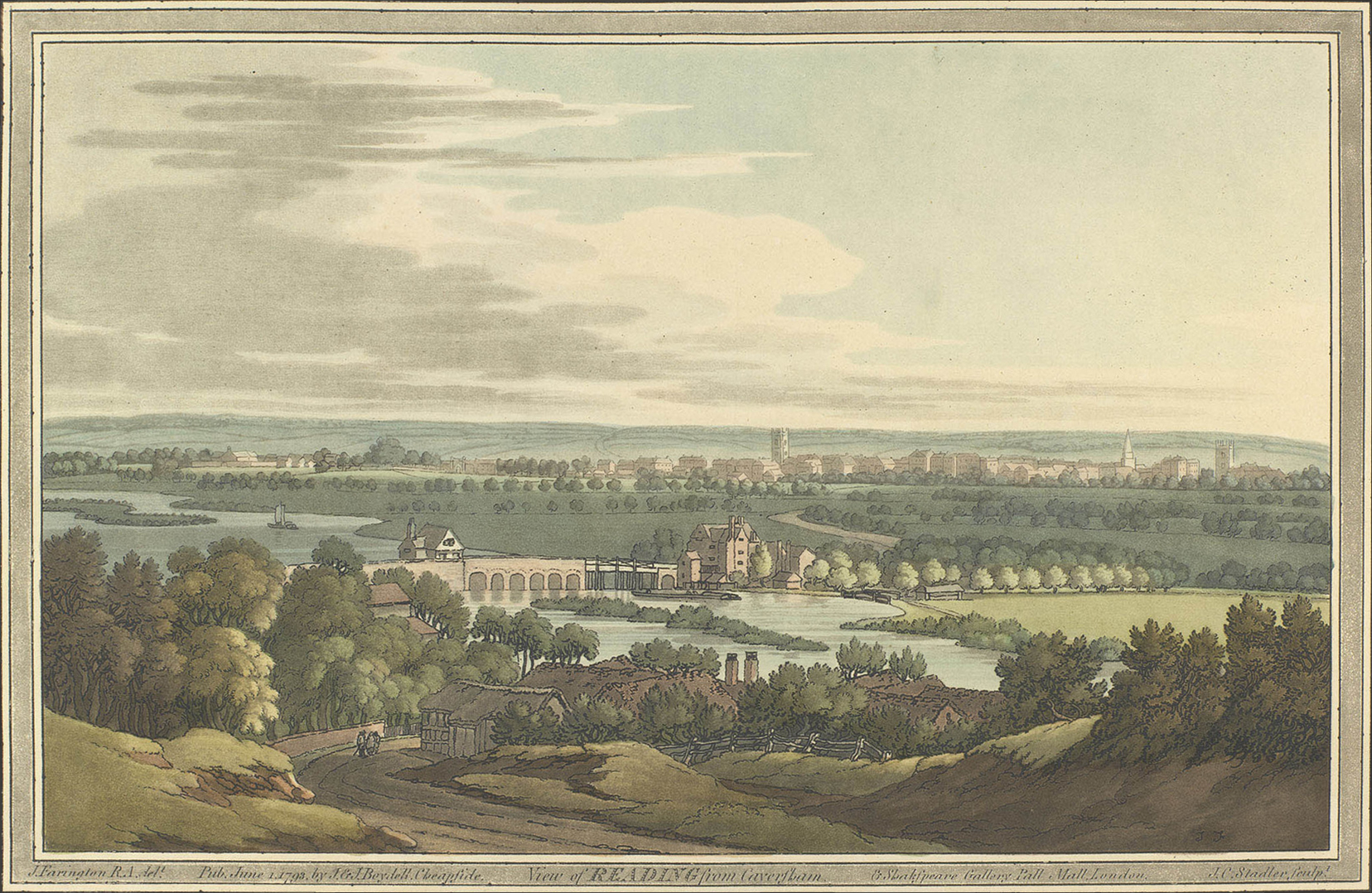
View of Reading from Caversham by Joseph Farington in 1793.

The 18th century saw the beginning of a major iron works in the town and the growth of the brewing trade for which Reading was to become famous. Agricultural products from the surrounding area still used Reading as a market place, especially at the famous Reading cheese fair but now trade was coming in from a wider area.

Reading's trade benefited from better designed turnpike roads which helped it establish its location on the major coaching routes from London to Oxford and the west country. It also gained from increasing river traffic on both the Thames and Kennet. In 1723, despite considerable local opposition, the Kennet Navigation opened the River Kennet to boats as far as Newbury. This opposition stopped when it became apparent the new route benefited the town. The opening of the Kennet and Avon Canal in 1810 made it possible to go by barge from Reading to the Bristol Channel.

From 1714, and probably earlier, the role of county town for Berkshire was shared between Reading and Abingdon. The Assize and Quarter Sessions courts met in both towns, with the Lenten Assizes traditionally held in Reading and the Summer Assizes in Abingdon. The county gaol was at Reading, but both had a house of correction, also known as a Bridewell, that held prisoners from various parts of the county.

Towards the end of the century, Henry Addington, 1st Viscount Sidmouth, lived at Bulmershe Court, in what is now the Reading suburb of Woodley. Although he moved to Richmond when he was appointed prime minister, he retained his local connections. He donated to the town of Reading the four acres (16,000 m^{2}) of land that is today the Royal Berkshire Hospital, and his name is commemorated in the town's Sidmouth Street and Addington Road.

== 19th century ==
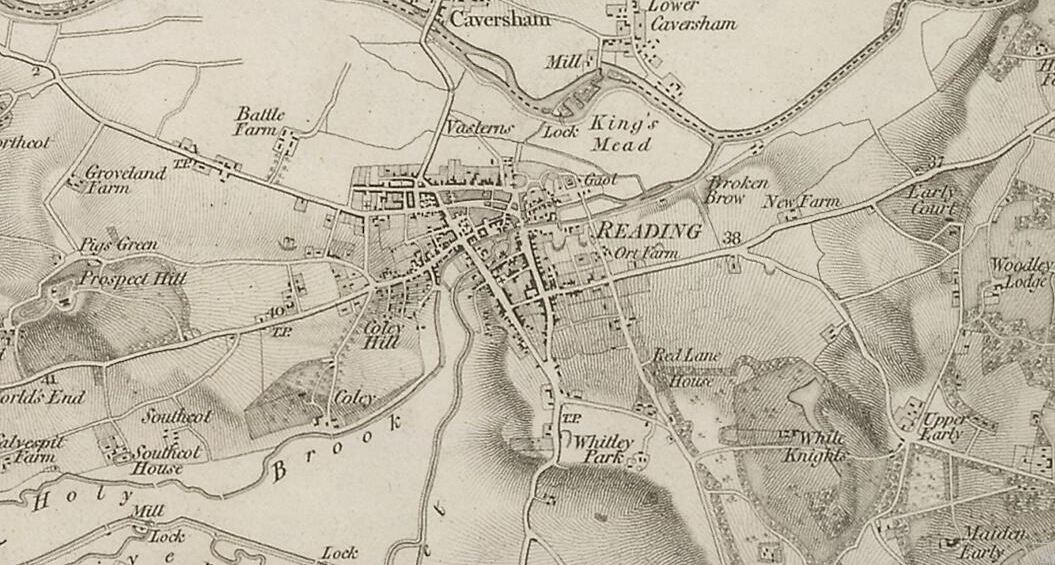
Map of Reading from 1830 by Ordnance Survey.

In 1801, the population of Reading was about 9,400. During the 19th century, the town grew rapidly as a manufacturing centre. Reading maintained its representation by two members of parliament with the Reform Act 1832, and the borough was one of the ones reformed as a municipal borough by the Municipal Corporations Act 1835. In 1836 the Reading Borough Police were founded. The Great Western Railway arrived in 1841, followed by the South Eastern Railway, in 1849, and the London and South Western Railway, in 1856.

The Reading Establishment, an early commercial photographic studio, operated in Reading from 1844 to 1847 and was managed by Nicholaas Henneman, a Dutchman and former valet of William Henry Fox Talbot (a pioneer of photography). Many of the images for The Pencil of Nature by Fox Talbot, the first book to be illustrated with photographic prints, were printed in Reading.

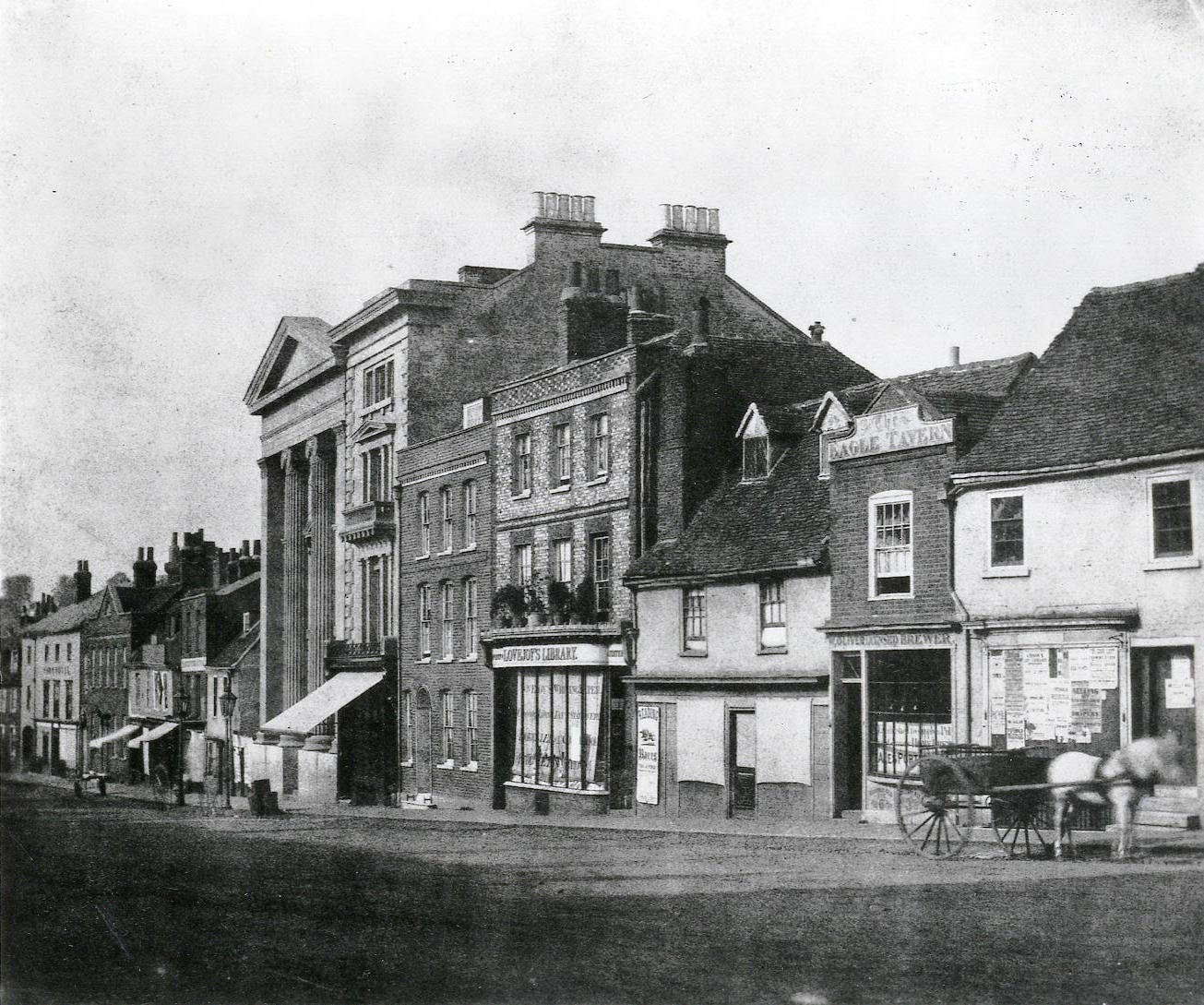
London Street in Reading, centre: Lovejoy's Library

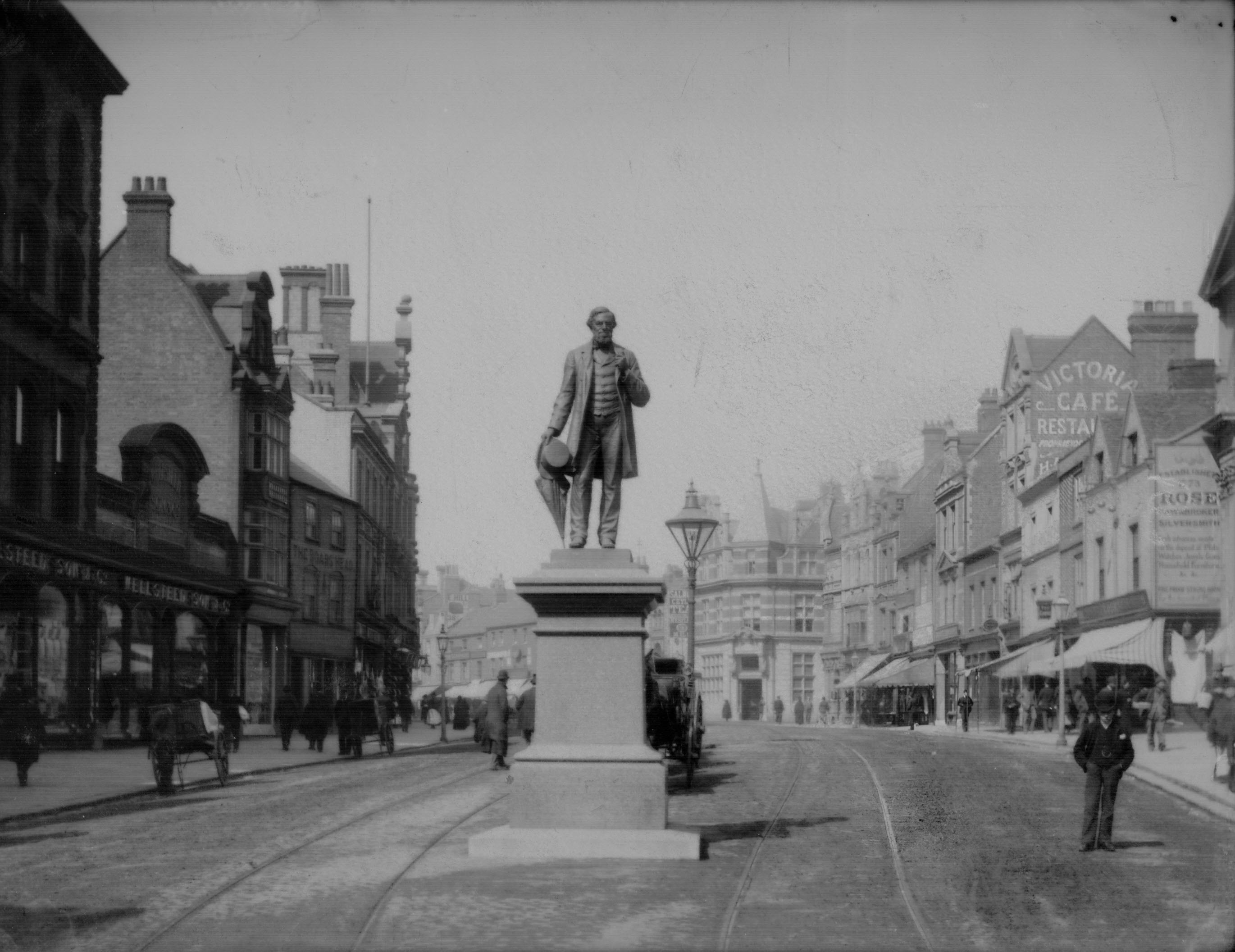
The statue of George Palmer, Broad Street looking westwards, c. 1890.

By 1851 the population was 21,500. The previous year, the Reading Union Water Company had started construction of the works to resolve the shortage of safe drinking water that was affecting the growing town. Untreated water was pumped to the Bath Road Reservoir by a pumping station at Southcote Lock on the River Kennet, and filtered there before being gravity fed to consumers. The works were completed by 1852.

The Summer Assizes were moved from Abingdon to Reading in 1867, effectively making Reading the sole county town of Berkshire, a decision that was officially approved by the privy council in 1869. The town became a county borough under the Local Government Act 1888. A permanent military presence was established in the city with the completion of Brock Barracks in 1881.

By 1900, the population was 59,000—large sections of the housing in Reading are terraced, reflecting its 19th-century growth. The town has been famous for the Three Bs of beer (1785–2010, H & G Simonds), bulbs (1837–1974, Suttons Seeds), and biscuits (1822–1976, Huntley and Palmers). In the 19th century the town also made 'Reading Sauce', described as a sharp sauce flavoured with onions, spices, and herbs, very much like Worcestershire Sauce.

== 20th and 21st centuries ==
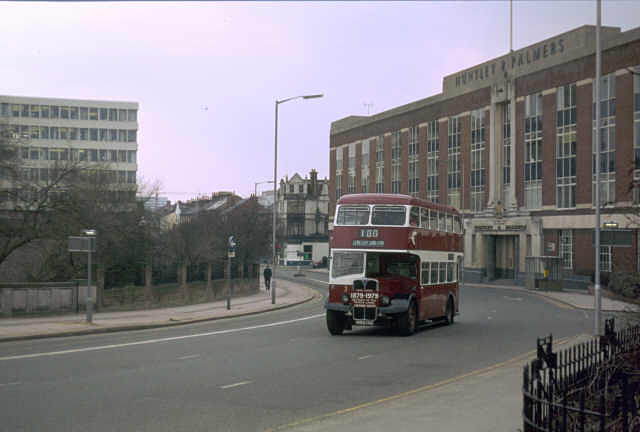
Kings Road in 1979, on the right is the demolished Huntley & Palmers building.

Compared to many other English towns and cities, Reading suffered little physical damage during either of the two World Wars that afflicted the 20th century, although many of its citizens lost their lives, or were injured, in the conflicts. The names of the dead are remembered on the Berkshire War Memorial at the entrance to Forbury Gardens, or on various suburban war memorials. One significant air raid occurred on 10 February 1943, when a single Luftwaffe plane machine-gunned and bombed the town centre, resulting in 41 deaths and over 100 injuries. Most of these were accounted for by a single bomb, which struck the crowded People's Pantry restaurant in the Market Arcade. In 1947, Phoebe Cusden, the then Mayor of Reading, travelled to Düsseldorf, Germany, in response to a request by the colonel of the Royal Berkshire Regiment stationed there. Discovering that the city was suffering extreme privation, she rallied support from residents and arranged food parcels clothing and toys to go to the area. In the year after her mayoralty she invited six Düsseldorf children to stay in Reading for three months, and set up the Reading-Düsseldorf Association to continue the connection, which has continued to this day.

The town continued to expand in the 20th century, annexing Caversham across the River Thames in Oxfordshire in 1911. This expansion can be seen in the number of 1920s built semi-detached properties, and the 1950s expansion that joined Woodley, Earley and Tilehurst into Reading. Miles Aircraft in Woodley was an important local firm from the 1930s to 1950s. The Lower Earley development, started in the 1970s, was the largest private housing development in Europe. This extended the urban area of Reading up to the M4 motorway, which acts as the southern boundary to the town. Further housing developments have increased the number of modern commuter houses in the surrounding parts of Reading, and 'out-of-town' shopping hypermarkets.

At the end of 1966 the Yield Hall multi-storey car park was opened, providing covered space for 522 cars. It was noted that the ramps were arranged to segregate up-traffic from down-traffic, with "one-way circulation" through most of the building.

The local shopping centre, The Oracle, built in 1999, is named after the 17th century Oracle workhouse with funds bequeathed by John Kendrick, which once occupied a small part of the site. It provides three storeys of shopping and boosted the local economy by providing 4,000 jobs.

As the largest settlement in the United Kingdom to be without city status, Reading has bid for city status on three recent occasions – in 2000 to celebrate the new millennium; in 2002 to celebrate the Golden Jubilee of Queen Elizabeth II; and 2012 to celebrate the Diamond Jubilee. All three bids were unsuccessful.

The murder of Mary-Ann Leneghan occurred in Prospect Park on 7 May 2005. Three people were killed in a mass stabbing in Forbury Gardens on 20 June 2020.

== See also ==
- Timeline of Reading, Berkshire
