= Blackall Simonds =

Blackall Simonds may refer to:

- William Blackall Simonds (1761–1834), a brewer and banker from Reading, England
- George Blackall Simonds (1843–1929), a sculptor and brewer from Reading, England

== See also ==
- H & G Simonds Ltd
- Simonds (disambiguation)
