= High Bridge, Reading =

Bridge in Reading, England

High Bridge
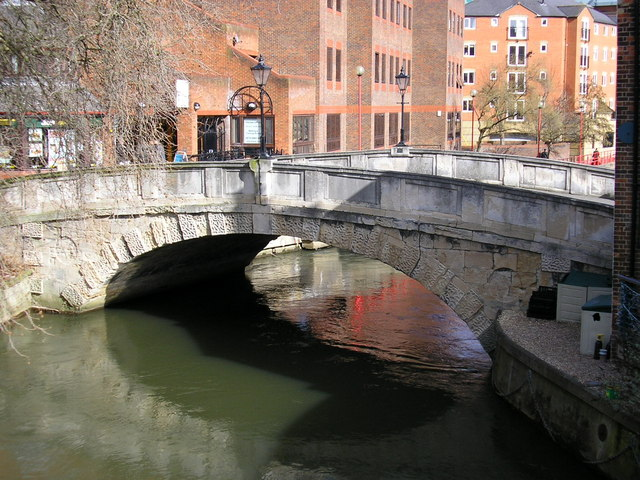
- View of High Bridge looking upstream
- Coordinates: 51°27′14.85″N 0°58′6.9″W
- Carries: London Street
- Crosses: River Kennet
- Locale: Reading
- Official name: High Bridge
- Other name: Duke Street Bridge
- Heritage status: Scheduled monument Grade II listed building

Characteristics
- Design: Arch
- Material: Portland stone

History
- Architect: John Soane
- Opened: November 1788

Location
- Interactive map of High Bridge

High Bridge, sometimes known as Duke Street Bridge, is a bridge across the River Kennet in the town centre of Reading in the English county of Berkshire. It links Duke Street, to its north, and London Street, to its south. High Bridge is the oldest surviving bridge across the Kennet, and is both a scheduled monument and a grade II listed building. It comprises a single arch of vermiculated Portland stone, with a plain keystone of ashlar.

The bridge forms the downstream limit of the Brewery Gut, a particularly narrow stretch of the river, and, situated as it is on a blind bend on the river, itself provides a challenge for navigation. For this reason, navigation under the bridge and through the Brewery Gut is controlled by a set of traffic lights on a one-way basis.

== History ==
The first bridge in Reading to be built over the Kennet was located at Seven Bridges, in the oldest, Saxon, part of the town. The bridging point now occupied by the High Bridge was probably the second to be used, providing, as it did, a more convenient access to Reading Abbey (founded in 1121) and its environs. Certainly there was a bridge on the site by the time of John Speed's map of 1611, and in 1707 a new wooden bridge was constructed on the site.

By 1788, the timber-framed bridge of 1707 required replacement, and a stone bridge able to handle wagon traffic generated by the textile industry was commissioned. Initially commissioned from architect Robert Furze Brettingham the Corporation rejected his design and went for a single arch bridge in consultation with "Mr Soane". it was built at a cost of £3,500.

For much of its life, the current bridge formed the downstream limit of the stretch of the River Kennet dominated by the presence of Simonds Brewery. Since 1999, it has fulfilled the same role with respect to the riverside precinct of the Oracle shopping centre, which has replaced the brewery, along with the Reading Buses depot on the opposite bank, with riverside restaurants and other leisure facilities.

In 2024 the bridge underwent repairs, including work to restore the parapets, which had deteriorated.
