= Green Girls' School =

The Green Girls' School

Location
- Reading, Berkshire St Mary's Butts (c.1782-1792) 54-56 Broad Street (c.1792-1884) 38 Russell Street (c.1884-1922)

Information
- School type: Charity school for the training of female domestic servants
- Religious affiliation(s): Church of England
- Established: 1782
- Closed: 1922

The Green Girls' School was a charity school in Reading, Berkshire, South East England. Established in 1782, its mission was to provide a basic education for girls from working class backgrounds and to prepare them for a life of domestic service. Its pupils were trained in household skills, 'to do plain work and to cook, wash and iron'. The school's name is believed to have been derived from the green uniforms worn by its pupils. Having started life in St Mary's Butts, the school moved to premises in Broad Street between 1792 and 1884, and relocated to Russell Street between 1884 and 1922, when it eventually closed.

Following the closure of the Green Girls' School, a new charitable body, the Green Girls' Foundation, was established in 1929. It continues to exist as a registered charity in England. The foundation makes grants to young women living in Reading to assist with educational costs.

A number of artefacts related to or from the Green Girls' School are held at Reading Museum. These include a photograph of pupil Miss Elsie Nellie Watson, who attended the school between 1903 and 1907, and two samplers made by pupils in 1854 and 1908. The museum also holds an oil painting of A Pupil of Green Girls' School by Annie Margaret Bradley.
