= Vachel Almshouses =

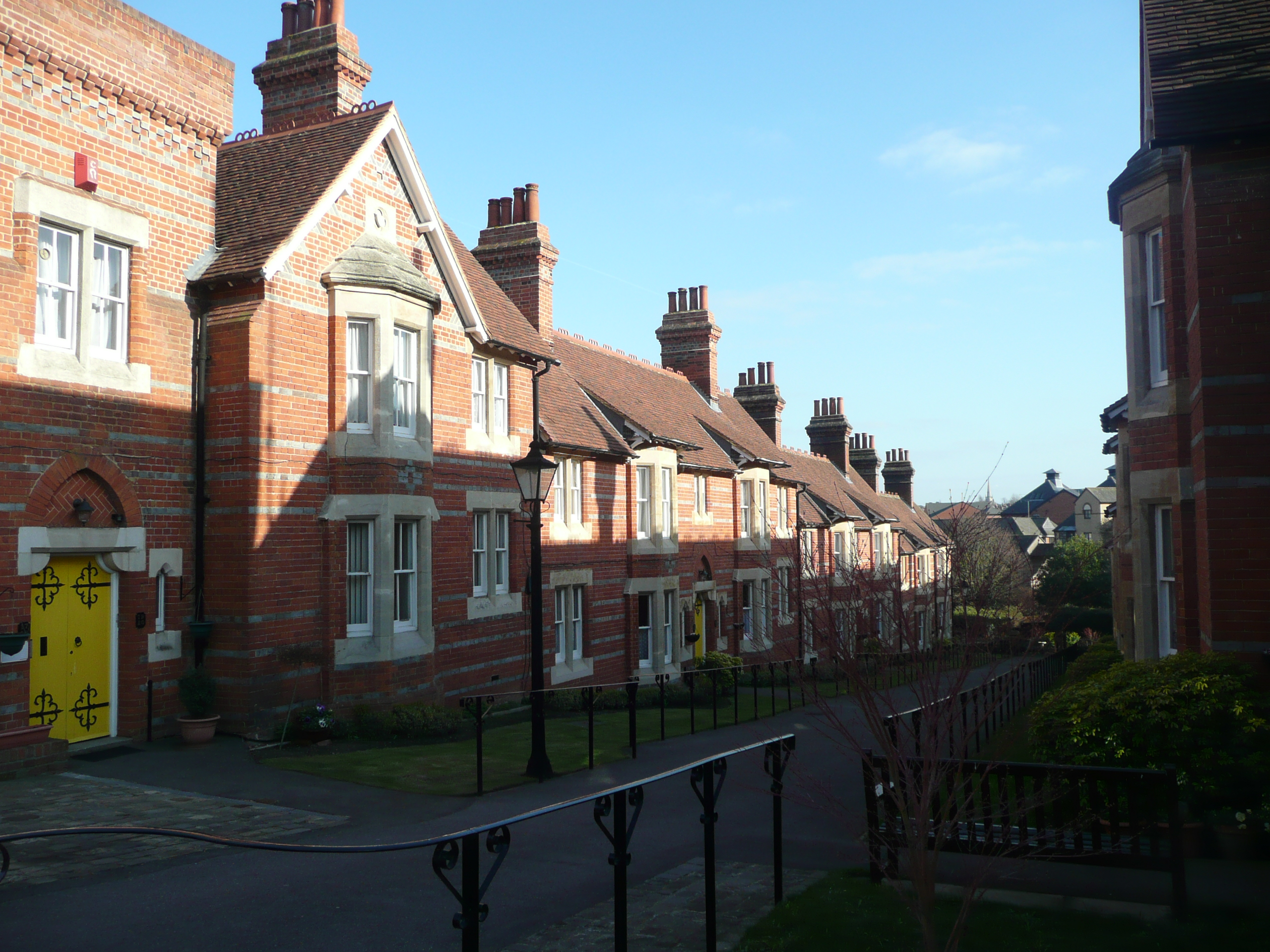
- Vachel Almshouses in 2011

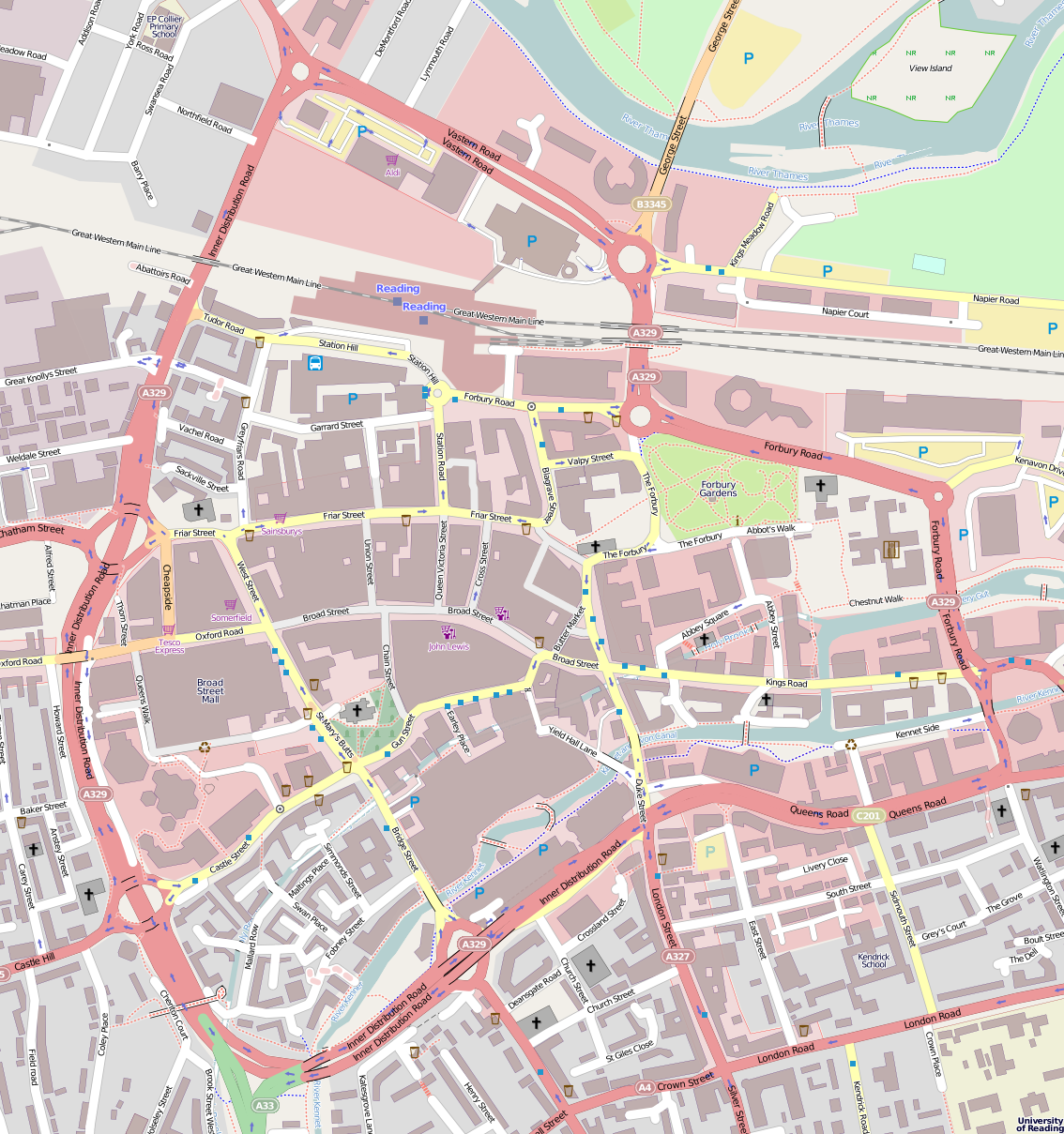
- Location within Reading Central
- Former names: St Mary’s Almshouses

General information
- Status: Grade II listed
- Type: Almshouses
- Architectural style: Vernacular
- Location: Almshouses, Castle Street; Reading; Berkshire; United Kingdom; RG1 7SS
- Coordinates: 51.45228°N 0.976034°W
- Completed: 1867

Technical details
- Floor count: 2

Design and construction
- Architect: W H Woodman

Vachel Almshouses is a terrace of almshouses in the town of Reading in the English county of Berkshire.

== History ==
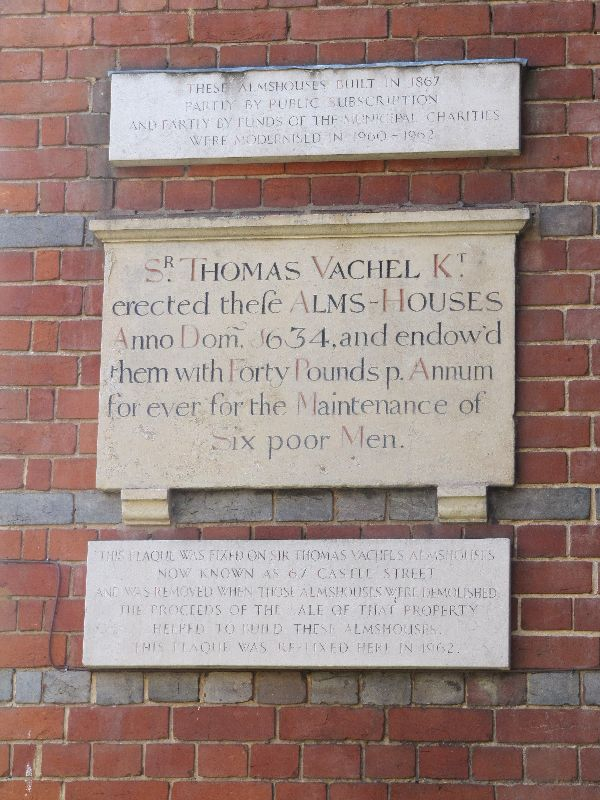
Plaque from original building

In 1634 almshouses were built in St Mary's Butts, which were called 'St Mary's Almshouses'. The almshouses were built by Thomas Vachel. A plaque fixed on the building reads:

Sr. Thomas Vachel Kt. erected theſe Alms-Houses Anno Dom. 1634, and endow'd them with Forty Pounds p. Annum for ever for the Maintenance of Six Poor Men.

They were demolished in 1867 and replaced with new buildings at a new location in Castle Street, with money coming from the sale of the land. The new almshouses were renamed Vachel Almshouses after Thomas Vachel. They were designed by architect William Henry Woodman. The Almshouses were modernised in 1960–62.
