= Henry Simonds =

English cricketer and barrister

Personal information
- Full name: Henry John Simonds
- Born: 23 March 1828; Caversham, Berkshire, England
- Died: 28 January 1896 (aged 67); Caversham, Berkshire, England
- Batting: Unknown

Domestic team information
- Years: Team
- 1849–1850: Cambridge University

Career statistics
Competition	First-class
Matches	2
Runs scored	5
Batting average	1.25
100s/50s	–/–
Top score	3
Catches/stumpings	1/–
- Source: Cricinfo, 2 January 2022

Henry John Simonds JP (23 March 1828 – 25 January 1896) was an English first-class cricketer and barrister.

The son of William May Simonds, he was born at Caversham in March 1828. He was educated at Eton College, before going up to King's College, Cambridge. While studying at Cambridge, he played two first-class cricket matches for Cambridge University Cricket Club, against Cambridge Town Club at Fenner's in 1849 and in The University Match against Oxford University at Oxford in 1850. He had little success in these two matches, scoring just 5 runs. He was a fellow of King's College from 1849 to 1858.

A student of the Inner Temple, he was called to the bar in January 1853 to practice on the Western Circuit. He was appointed a justice of the peace for Oxfordshire in January 1868. He was a partner in the family brewing business, H & G Simonds Ltd, which was named by his father after him and his brother, George. He was active in local politics and was a Chairman of his local Conservative Association. Simonds died at his residence in Caversham in January 1896.
