= Kendrick baronets =

Extinct baronetcy in the Baronetage of England

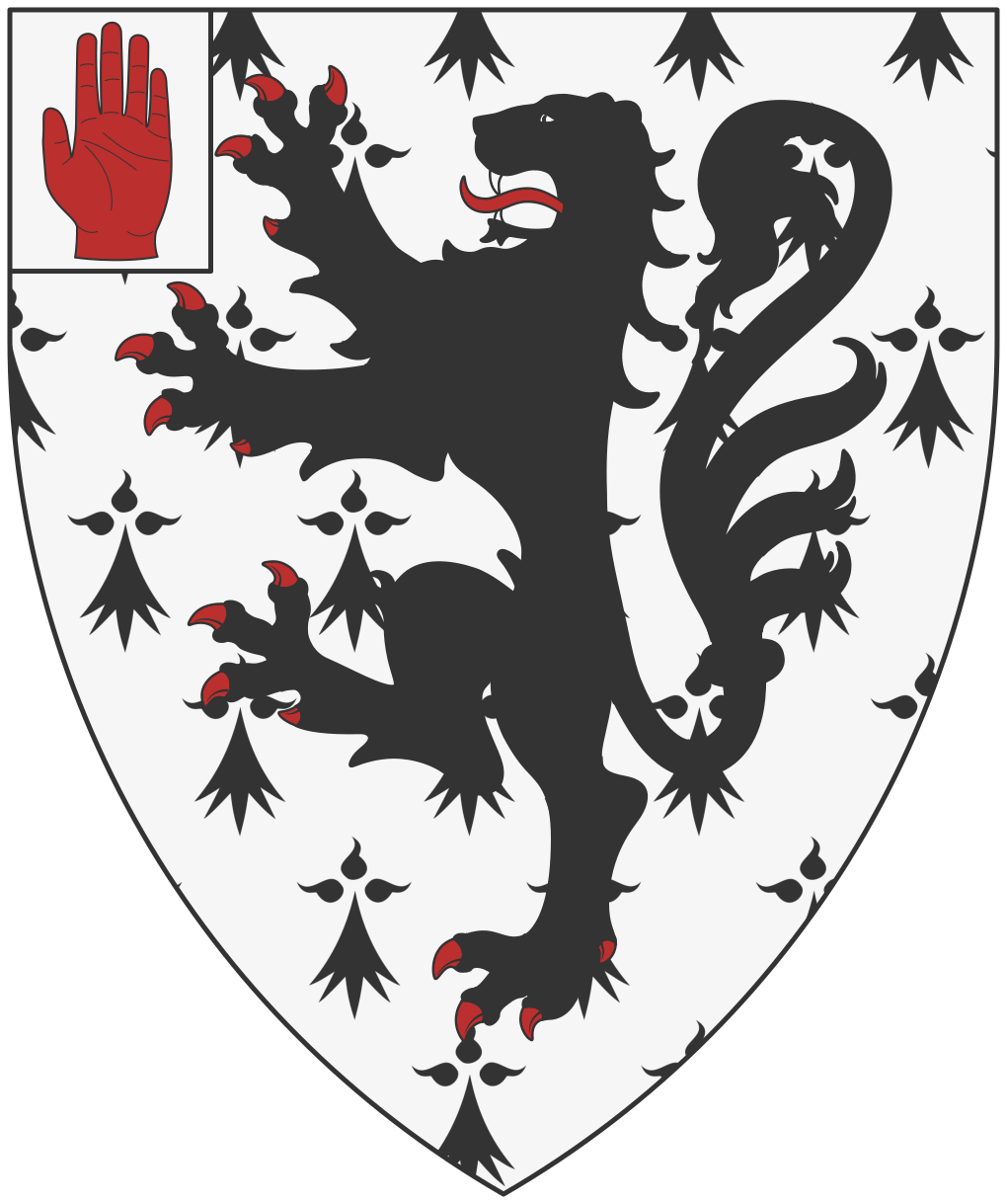
The coat of arms of Kendrick of Whitley, Baronets.

The Kendrick Baronetcy, of Whitley in the County of Berkshire, was a title in the Baronetage of England. It was created on 29 March 1679 for William Kendrick, grand-nephew of the famous cloth merchant and philanthropist, John Kendrick. The title became extinct on the death of the second Baronet in 1699.

== Kendrick baronets, of Whitley (1679) ==
- Sir William Kendrick, 1st Baronet (died 1684)
- Sir William Kendrick, 2nd Baronet (1665–1699)
