= Bridge Street, Reading =

Street in Reading, England

Seven Bridges
- Bridge Street
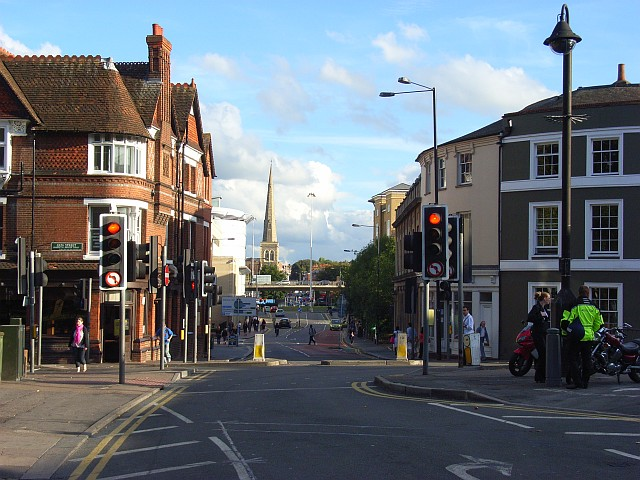
- Looking down Bridge Street from St Mary's Butts

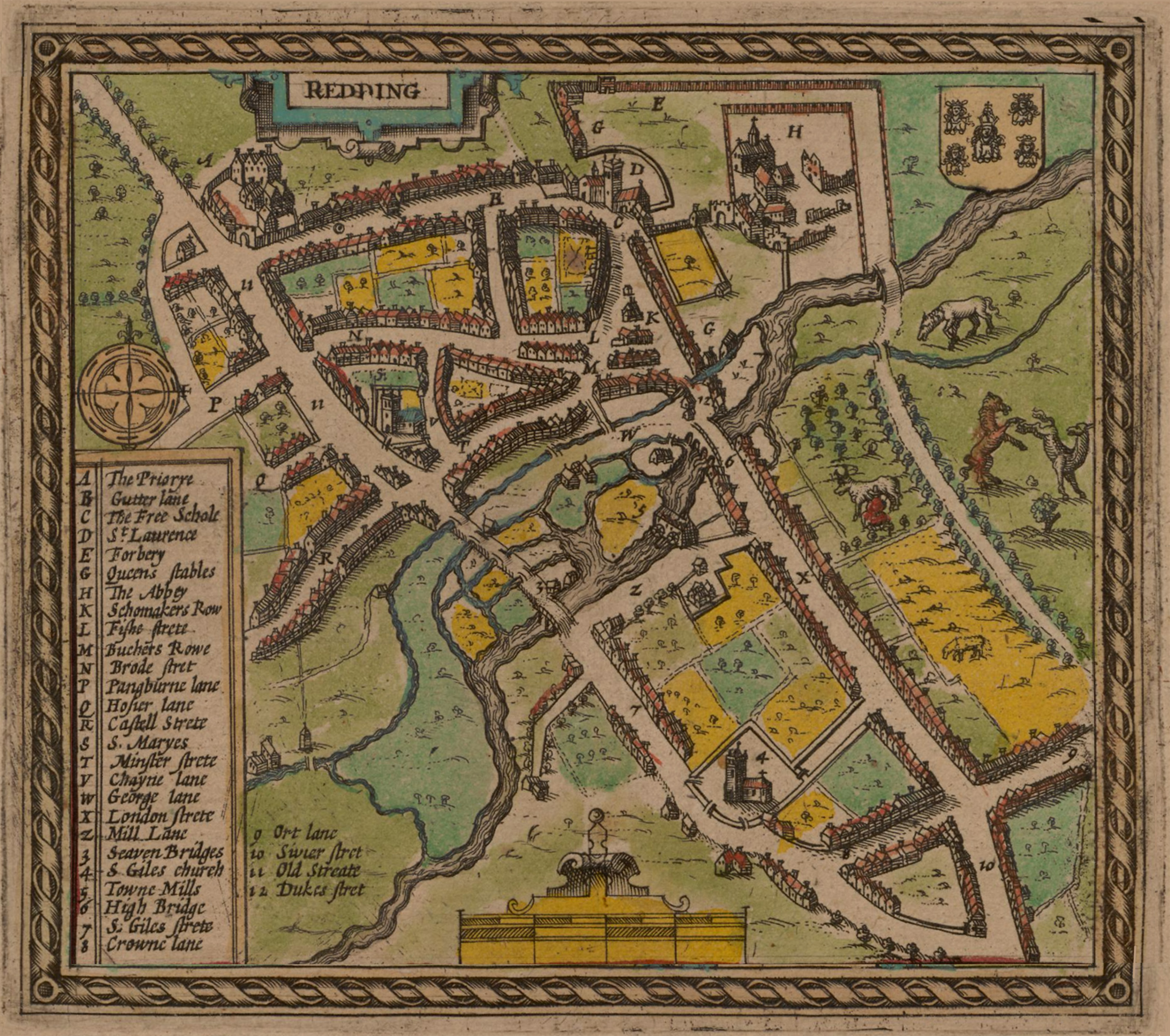
- Map of Reading by John Speed from 1611, showing five of the seven bridges
- Length: 780 ft (240 m)
- Postal code: RG1 2
- Coordinates: 51°27′8.94″N 0°58′20.59″W
- southeast end: A329
- northwest end: St Mary's Butts

Bridge Street, formerly known as Seven Bridges, is a historic street in the town of Reading, Berkshire, England. It took its original name from the seven bridges that carried it over various channels of the River Kennet, and was the earliest crossing place of that river in the town.

Bridge Street connects Southampton Street, formerly known as St Giles' Street, to the south, with St Mary's Butts to the north.

== History ==
It is thought that this location was chosen as a crossing point due to the shallow streams being easier to build upon, rather than the deeper water downstream at the point where High Bridge is built or the marshland upstream.

When the importance of the crossing had increased, it became known as Seven Bridges due to the number of bridges. Ordered from south to north, these streams were:

- St Giles’ Mill Stream, following the line of Mill Lane to St Giles' Mill.
- The current main stream, which was not always the main stream. Originally St Giles' Mill Stream carried most of the water.
- A flood relief channel, 10 m (33 ft) north of main stream.
- Another flood relief channel, north of previous one.
- Grey's Lock Stream, also known as Simonds Ditch. This was part of a network of small streams which were once navigable by small boats.
- Minster Mill Stream, originally carried water to the Minster Mill, which may have dated from the Saxon period.
- Holy Brook, built to drive the Abbey Mill and to drain the toilets of the Abbey.

Up until the end of the 17th century, the head of navigation of the River Kennet was in the vicinity of High Bridge, downstream of Seven Bridges. However, between 1718 and 1723, the Kennet was made navigable upstream to Newbury, and as part of this work County Lock was constructed in the main channel just upstream of the bridges. Despite this work, the section of the main channel downstream of the bridge remained a difficult and narrow navigation, and came to be known as Brewery Gut.

In 1790 Simonds' Brewery moved to a new brewhouse at Seven Bridges. Over time the brewery expanded, coming to occupy large quantities of land alongside the river on both sides of Bridge Street.

== Today ==
Simond's Brewery, which had by then become Courage's Brewery, moved out of Bridge Street in 1978. The western part of its site is now occupied by residential developments, whilst the eastern section of its site is now occupied by part of the large Oracle shopping centre. The extant Seven Bridges House, adjoining the main site, was not originally part of the brewery but was eventually taken over by them and used as offices and a social club. Other than this, and some buildings flanking the junction with St Mary's Butts, all the buildings fronting the street now date from the late 20th century.

Today little can be seen of most of the channels that gave the street its original name. The main channel is still clearly visible to both sides of the street, with the Brewery Gut now flowing through the centre of the Oracle shopping centre. St Giles' Mill Stream can still be seen by County Lock, where it leaves the main stream and flows underground before rejoining in the Oracle. The Holy Brook still exists; whilst much of it is underground, exposed sections can be found near the St Mary's Butts end of Bridge Street.

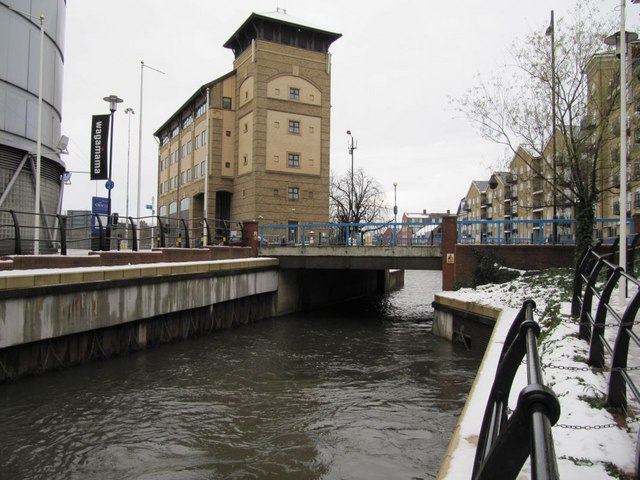
The current bridge over the main channel of the Kennet

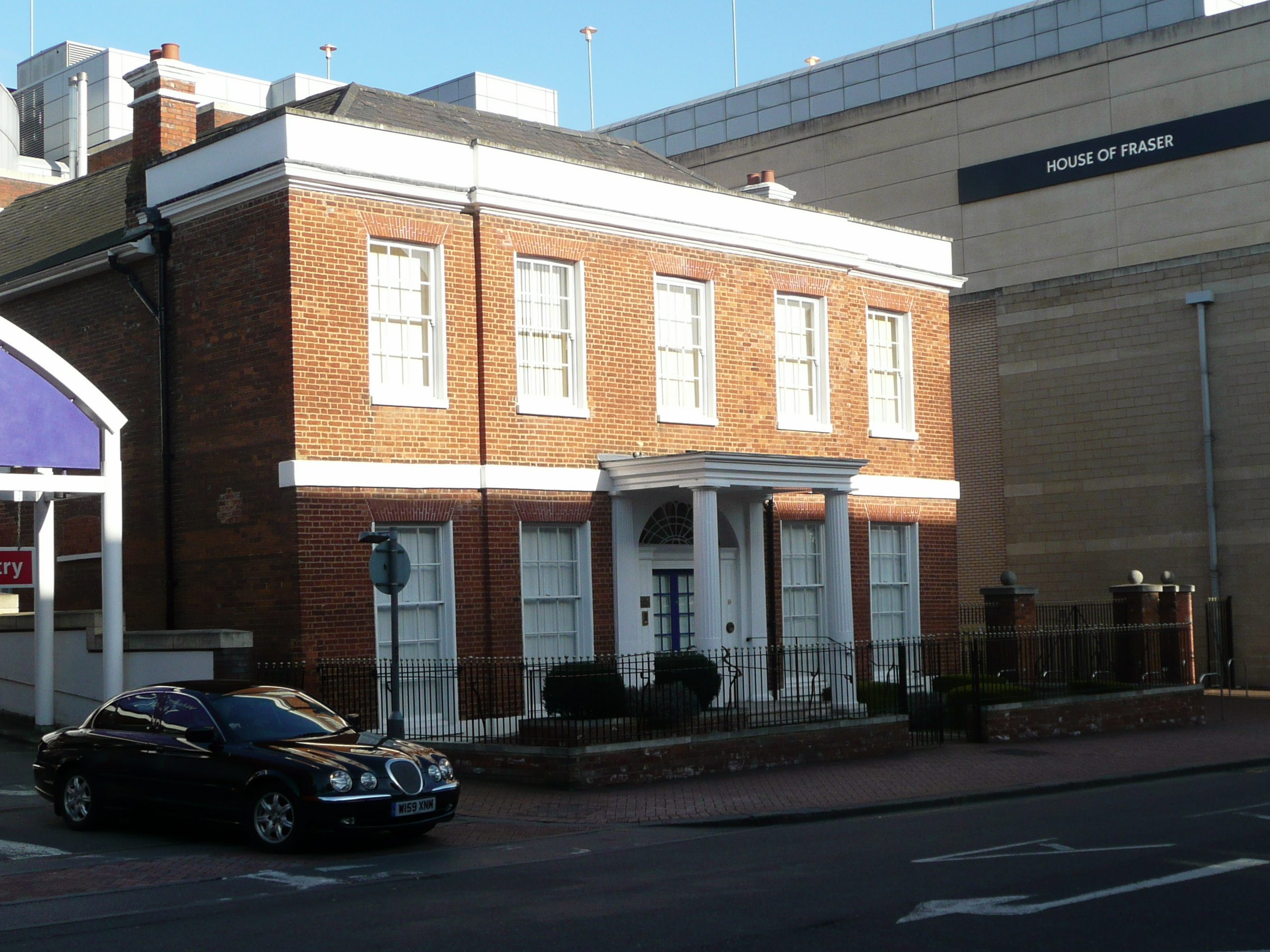
Seven Bridges House, the only remnant on Bridge Street of Simonds' Brewery

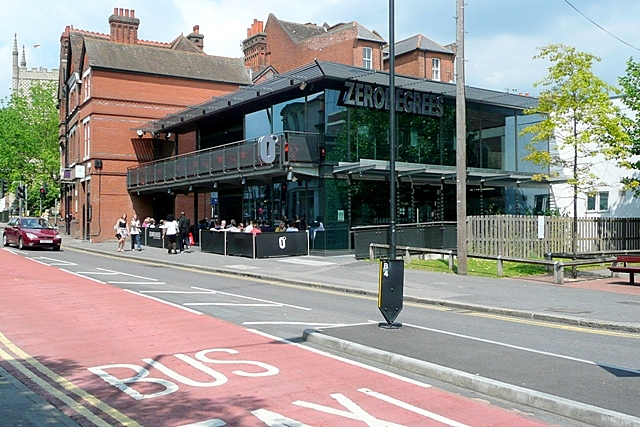
The Zero Degrees brew-pub on Bridge Street; the Holy Brook passes under the patch of grass to the right
