= Kings Road Baptist Church, Reading =

Wycliffe Baptist Church
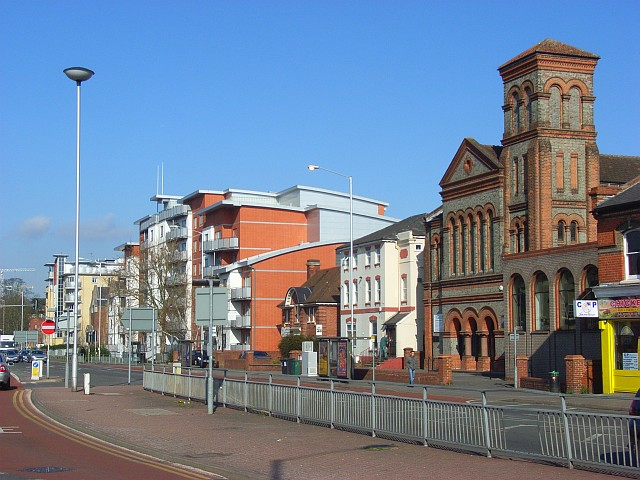
- Wycliffe Baptist Church on the right
- Wycliffe Baptist Church
- Location: Reading
- Country: England
- Denomination: Baptist

Architecture
- Functional status: Active

Administration
- Diocese: Oxford
- Archdeaconry: Berkshire

Kings Road Baptist Church was founded in Reading, Berkshire, United Kingdom in 1640 according to its own internal history; there were certainly Baptists in Reading by 1652, which is when representatives from that town began a Baptist Association with Henley and Abingdon. The church's forebears moved from Hosier Street (the present site of Reading's open-air market) to Kings Road in 1834 and remained in existence under that name until 1979. In that year the congregation moved to a new church building in Abbey Square and was renamed Abbey Baptist Church. Today Abbey Baptist Church is the home of three other culture-specific churches - Zion Church of God (a Tamil-speaking Sri Lankan/South Indian congregation), Living Streams International (an English-speaking Ghanaian congregation), and Peniel Church (a Portuguese-speaking Brazilian/Portuguese congregation) - as well as maintaining its own International, Intercultural Congregation. The church is well known for its extensive work amongst the many refugees currently housed in Reading.

The old Kings Road Baptist Church site is now the location of the Reading Central Library on Kings Road. Abbey Baptist Church may be found around the back of the same block, on Abbey Square. Wycliffe Baptist Church, sited a mile further out of town on Kings Road, was founded in 1881 by Kings Road Baptist Church.

== Sources ==
- Ernest A. Payne, The Baptists of Berkshire through Three Centuries (London: Carey Kingsgate Press, 1951), passim
