= Tilehurst Water Tower =

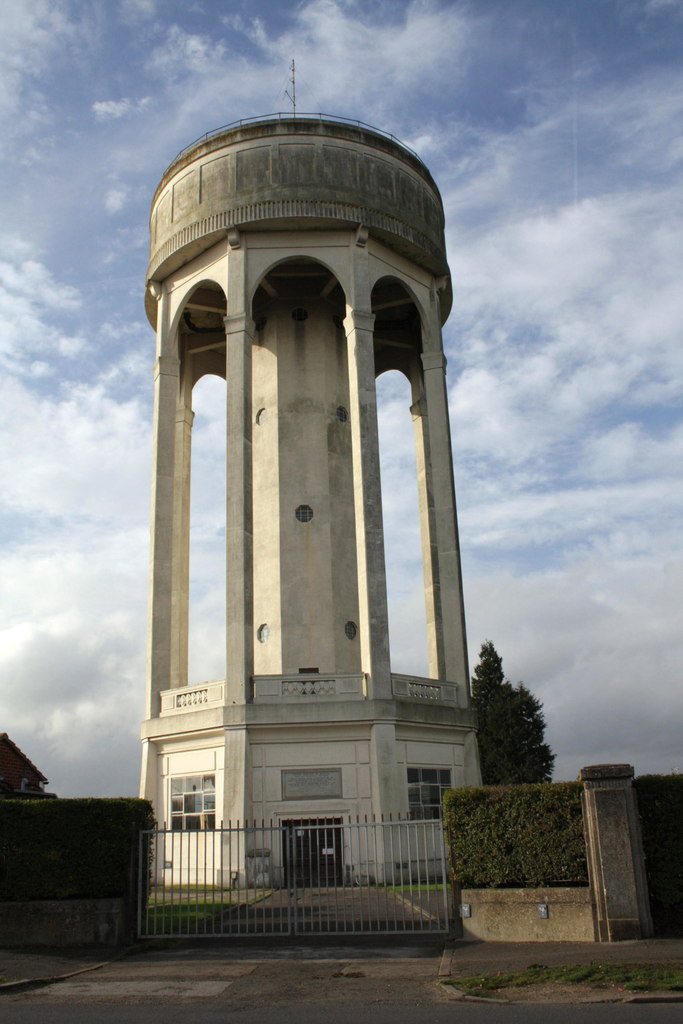
- Tilehurst Water Tower

- Location within Reading, Berkshire
- Alternative names: Park Lane Water Tower

General information
- Type: Water tower
- Location: Tilehurst, Reading, Berkshire
- Coordinates: 51°27′5.76″N 1°2′49.56″W
- Completed: 1932

Tilehurst Water Tower is a distinctive water tower in Tilehurst, a suburb of the English town and borough of Reading. It lies on a ridgeline at the highest point of both the borough and the town, with its base at 100 metres (330 ft) AMSL. Together with its own intrinsic height, this makes it a prominent landmark that can be seen from a considerable distance, especially when approaching Reading from the west along the M4 motorway.

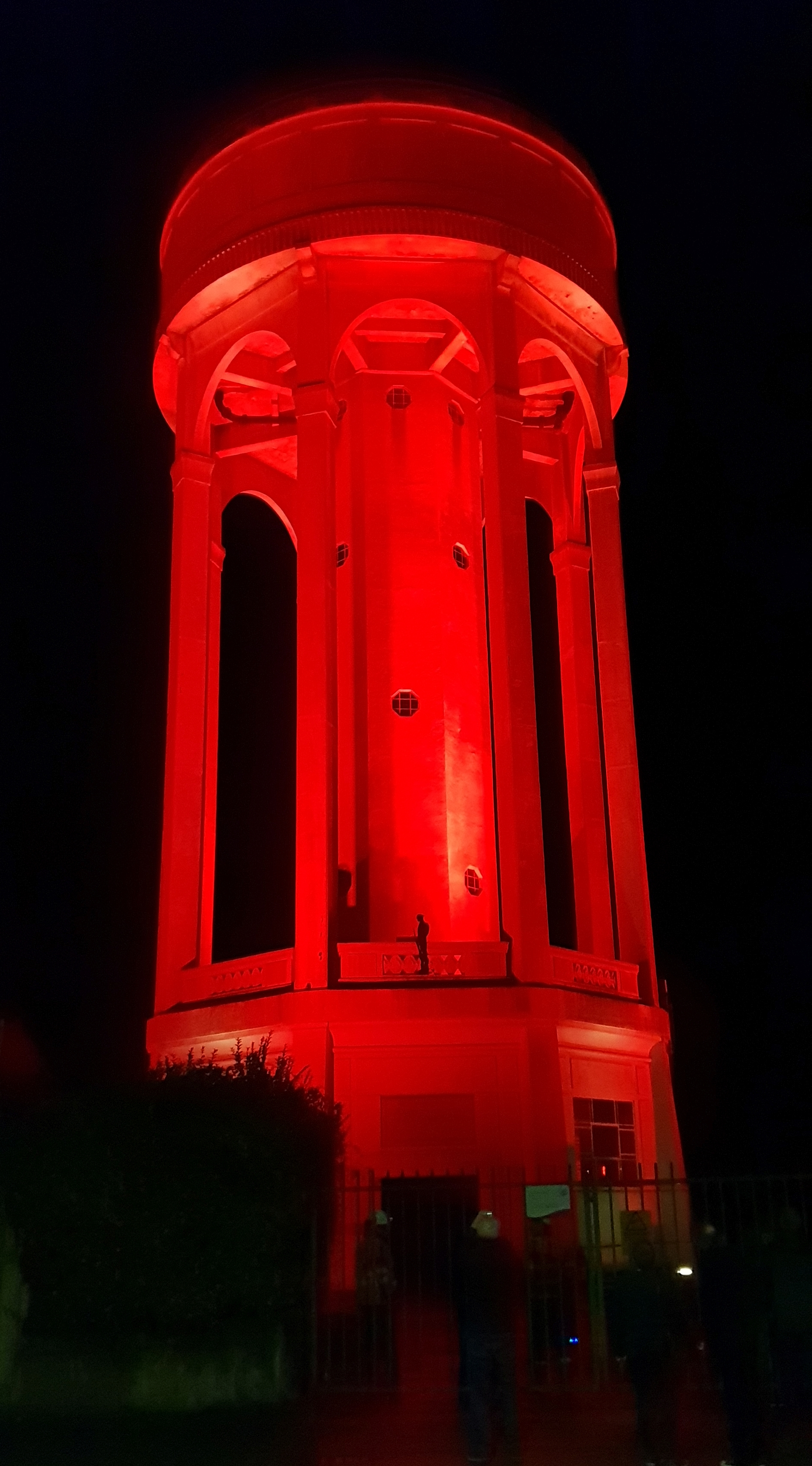
Remembrance Day 2018

The tower itself is approximately 36 metres (118 ft) tall. It has a total water capacity of 900,000 litres (200,000 imp gal; 240,000 US gal) and provides around 10 per cent of all the water used in Reading. It also houses the transmitter for Greatest Hits Radio Berkshire & North Hampshire, a local radio station.

The tower was erected by Reading Borough Council in 1932, in order to supplement the existing Bath Road Reservoir and supply water to properties at a higher level than the earlier water tower there. Today the tower belongs to Thames Water, and is still in use for its original purpose.

In November 2018 the tower was illuminated in poppy red to mark 100 years since the end of the First World War. The tower remained illuminated, and visible at night from a wide area, until Remembrance Day on 11 November.

The tower has given its name to a nearby public house, the Water Tower, and to the adjoining terminus of route 17 of Reading Buses.
