= Southcote Lock =

Canal lock in Berkshire, England

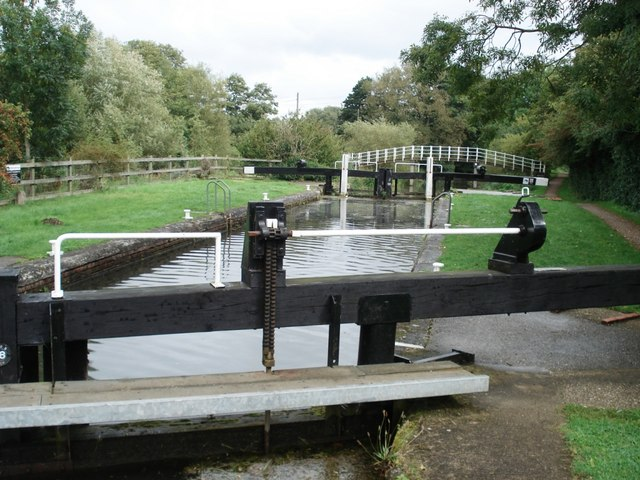
- Southcote Lock
- Interactive map of Southcote Lock
- 51.436001°N 1.004513°W
- Waterway: Kennet Navigation (Kennet and Avon Canal)
- Country: United Kingdom
- County: Berkshire
- Maintained by: Canal and River Trust
- Operation: Manual
- First built: 1723
- Latest built: c. 1970s
- Fall: 5 feet 3 inches (1.60 m)
- Distance to River Thames: 3.6 miles (5.8 km)
- Distance to Bristol Harbour: 90.3 miles (145.3 km)

Southcote Lock is a lock on the Kennet Navigation at Southcote near the town of Reading in Berkshire, England. It has a rise/fall of 5 feet 3 inches (1.60 m).

== History ==
Southcote Lock was built between 1718 and 1723 under the supervision of the engineer John Hore of Newbury.

During the 18th century, a wire mill was built on the south side of the canal, on an island between the canal navigation and the natural course of the Kennet. This mill was supplied with bar iron from Sowley Forge in Hampshire; both sites were operated by Charles Pocock Sr., Thomas Golden and Charles Pocock Jr.

In 1850, a pumping station was built on the north side of the canal. The station was used to pump water to the Bath Road Reservoir in Reading to cater for the town's population expansion and provided the town its first filtered water supply. By 1878, maps showed that the wire mill was disused; the Pocock–Golden partnership had been dissolved over half a century earlier.

In 1896, the Southcote Water Works (owned by the Reading Corporation) was superseded by the newly upgraded and steam-powered Fobney Pumping Station at the next lock downstream; Southcote's water wheels and pumps were mothballed. Three years later, however, the Southcote works were overhauled and new filters and pipes were installed.

In 1952, Southcote Lock was deemed unsafe and was subsequently closed. The navigation reopened by the mid-1970s.

The pumping station was in use until 1982 when Fobney was upgraded to cope with the town's demand; the main pumping building was converted into a residential dwelling and the wire mill remained derelict.

== See also ==
- Locks on the Kennet and Avon Canal

Next lock upstream	River Kennet	Next lock downstream
Burghfield Lock	Southcote Lock; Grid reference SU693712	Fobney Lock
