= Robert Furze Brettingham =

English architect

Robert Furze Brettingham (1750–1820) was an English architect, the nephew of Matthew Brettingham the Elder, who practised in London.

== Biography ==
=== Education ===
Like his uncle he spent a part of his early life in Italy, from where he returned in 1781. Brettingham's subsequent works, and the drawings which he exhibited on his return at the exhibitions of the Royal Academy, showed that he did not neglect his opportunities for study in Italy. Among them may be noted in 1783 a drawing of a sepulchral chapel from the Villa Medici at Rome, in 1790 the design for a bridge which he had erected in the preceding year at Benham Place, in Berkshire, and the entrance porch of the church at Saffron Walden restored by him in 1792.

In 1773 he published another edition of his uncle's Plans, &c. of Holkham, also, like it, in atlas folio, "to which are added the ceilings and chimney-pieces, and also a descriptive account of the statues, pictures, and drawings, not in the former edition." Descriptive Account Brettingham wrote the descriptive account; as in the original edition, the plans are ascribed to Matthew Brettingham, and William Kent is ignored.

=== Works ===
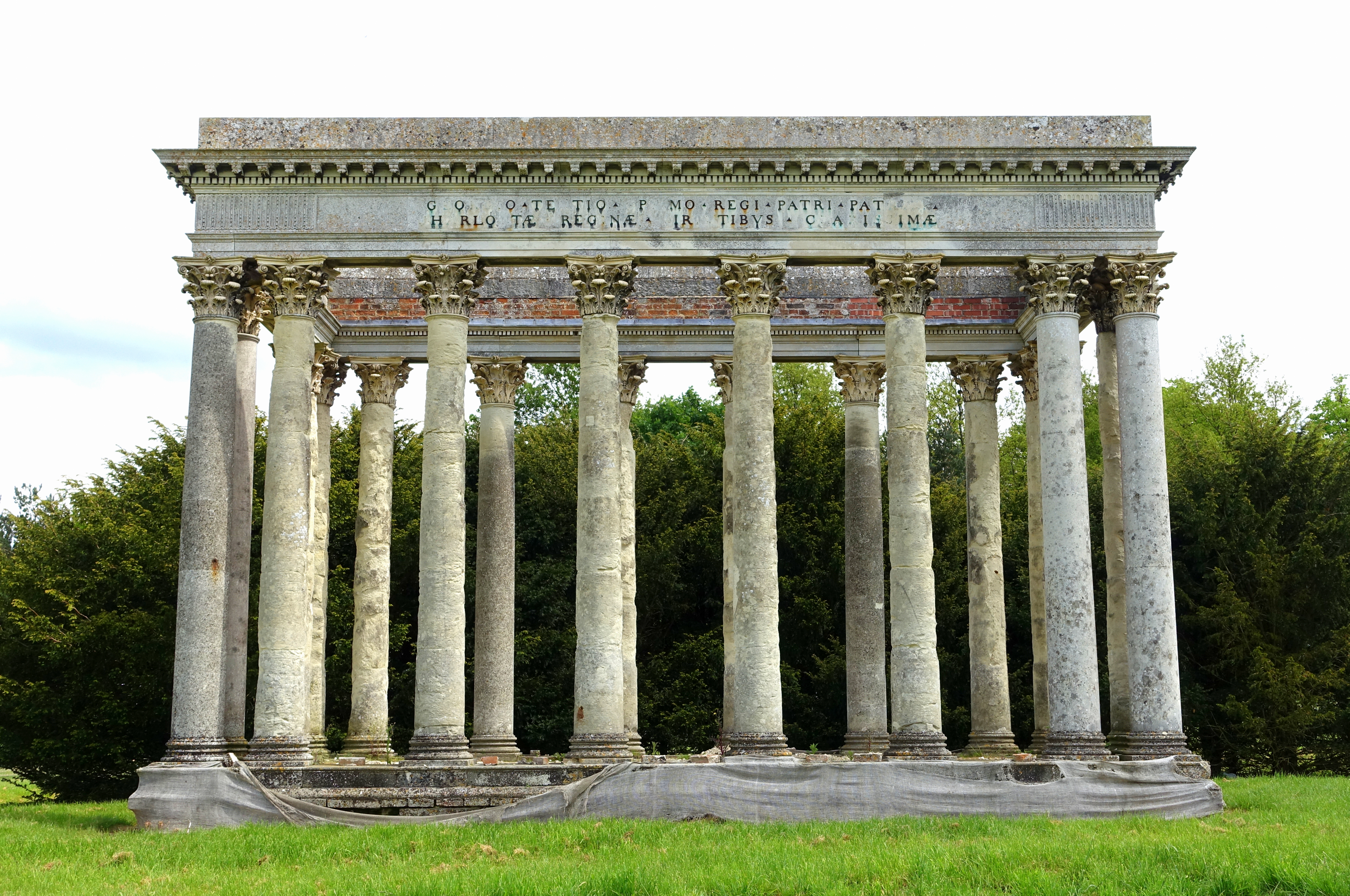
Temple Of Concord, Audley End House

The sudden death in 1790 of the prison architect William Blackburn, provided the great opportunity of Brettingham's life, and he soon gained a lucrative practice. Blackburn left many designs incomplete, several of which Brettingham subsequently carried into execution. He erected gaols at Reading, Hertford, Poole, Downpatrick, Northampton, and elsewhere.

In 1771 his name appears associated with those of the leading architects of the time in the foundation of the Architects' Club, which met to dine at the Thatched House Tavern on the first Thursday each month. Other original members of this club included Sir William Chambers, Robert Adam, John Soane, James Wyatt, and Samuel Pepys Cockerell. About this time Brettingham also held the post of resident clerk in the Board of Works, which he resigned in 1805.

His works for private patrons include the "Temple of Concord" in the grounds of Audley End House, a rectangular Corinthian imitation ruin built for Sir John Griffin in 1790 to celebrate George III's recovery from insanity, and a mausoleum in Scotland for the Fraser family. He also carried out work at Winchester House, St. James's Square, erected originally for the Duke of Leeds; 9 Berkeley Square, afterwards sold to the Marquis of Buckingham; Buckingham House, 91 Pall Mall, rebuilt in 1794 by Sir John Soane; Lansdowne House, Berkeley Square; 80 Piccadilly, for Sir Francis Burdett; Charlton, Wiltshire, for the Earl of Suffolk; Waldershare, Kent, for the Earl of Guilford; Felbrigg Hall, Norfolk, for the Hon. W. Wyndham; Longleat, Wiltshire; and Roehampton, Surrey, and Hillsborough House in Ireland, both for the Marquess of Downshire. Brettingham was held in much regard by his professional brethren, and was the esteemed master of many who later attained eminence in the architectural profession. He died in 1820.
