= William Blackall Simonds =

English brewer and banker

William Blackall Simonds (1761–1834) was a brewer and banker in the English town of Reading. He founded both H & G Simonds Brewery, which merged with other breweries to form Courage, Barclay, Simonds & Co in 1960, and J & C Simonds Bank, one of the precursors to Barclays bank.

Simonds came from a family with estates at Arborfield to the south-east of Reading, but his father, William Simonds senior, had moved to Reading to set up a malting business that later grew to include brewing. William senior married Mary Blackall, and William Blackall Simonds was their only son. He was probably born in Reading, with records showing that he was baptised at the Broad Street Independent Chapel in Reading on 13 August 1761.

When William senior died in 1782, William Blackall Simonds inherited his business. He married Elizabeth May, who was the heiress of Daniel May, the miller of Pangbourne, and the ward of Thomas May, the miller of Brimpton and founder of a brewery in Basingstoke. In 1789 Simonds acquired a site on the banks of the River Kennet, and commissioned the architect Sir John Soane to build a brewery and house on the site. The riverside site permitted transport of raw materials and finished product by barge, and was to continue to serve as a brewery until 1980.

In 1791, Simonds was co-founder of a bank in Reading's Market Place, in partnership with local businessmen Robert Micklem, John Stephens, and Robert Harris. His motivation in doing this was to help the brewery grow and to offer its output to a wider customer base. However this proved difficult, largely because local magistrates refused to issue licences for new public houses to sell his beer. As a consequence, Simonds decided to concentrate on his banking activities, and in 1814 he dissolved the original partnership and established a new family-run bank in partnership with his younger son Henry Simonds, and his cousins John Simonds and Charles Simonds. This bank was located in Reading's King Street and later became known as John Simonds, Charles Simonds & Co., Reading Bank.

Simonds served as mayor of Reading in 1816. He retired to London and then to Pangbourne, where he died on 13 January 1834 and was buried in the family plot in Hurst churchyard.

Simonds' descendants were involved in running both the brewery and bank for many years after his death. By the late 1860s the bank had branches in neighbouring towns from Basingstoke to High Wycombe. It was finally sold in 1913 to Barclays Bank, who continued to operate from its original King Street premises until 2008.

William Blackall Simonds' grandson George Blackall Simonds was a well known 19th century sculptor, who became chairman of the brewery in 1910. The brewery merged with the London breweries of Courage and Barclay Perkins in 1960. The merged company, known as Courage, Simonds and Barclay, continued to operate from Simonds' original location until 1980, when it moved to a new brewery on the southern outskirts of the town, close to the M4 motorway.
