= Bath Road Reservoir =

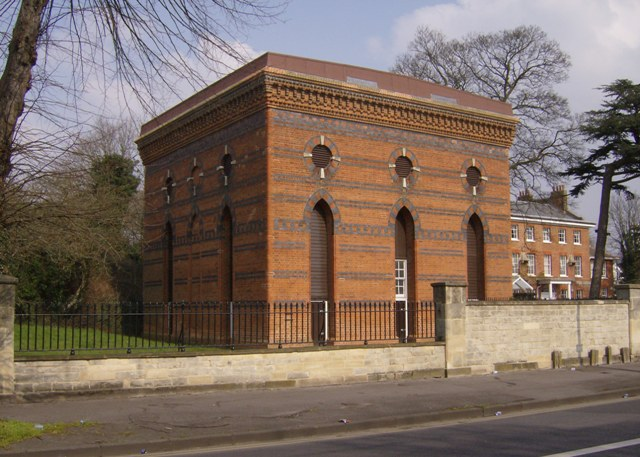
- The water tower at the reservoir site

- Location within Reading, Berkshire

General information
- Type: Reservoir and Water tower
- Location: Reading, Berkshire, UK
- Coordinates: 51°27′0.04″N 0°59′27.64″W
- Completed: 1850–1939

Listed Building – Grade II
- Official name: Water Tower
- Designated: 14 December 1978
- Reference no.: 1113397

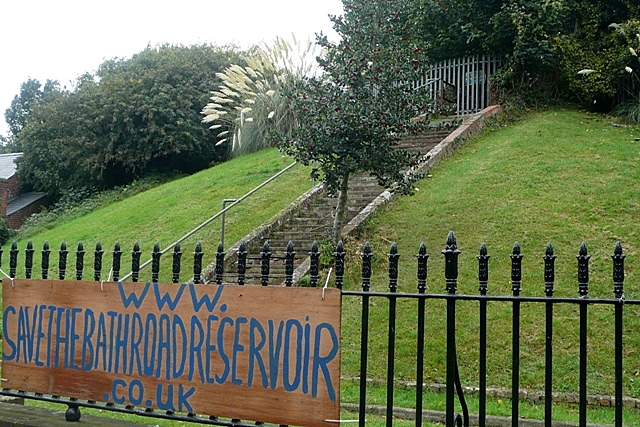
The reservoir bank, with banner supporting the Save The Bath Reservoir campaign

Bath Road Reservoir is an underground reservoir complex in the town of Reading in the English county of Berkshire. Located to the North-West of the Bath Road in West Reading, the complex covers 5.38 acres (2.18 ha). It comprises two underground reservoirs, covered entirely by vegetation, together with a water tower that is listed as a grade II listed building.

== History ==
The site dates back to 1850, when the Reading Union Water Company started construction of the reservoir, which opened in 1852. Originally untreated water was pumped to the reservoir by a pumping station at Southcote Lock on the River Kennet, and filtered on site before being gravity fed to consumers in the town. The site was acquired by Reading Borough Council in 1868, and the water tower built in 1870.

New reservoirs were constructed in 1900 and 1939, and these were supplemented by the construction of the Tilehurst Water Tower, on higher ground elsewhere, in 1932. The northern reservoir fell out of use by 1960, and the newer southern reservoir by 1993. The Bath Road water tower was last used in the 1970s.

== Development ==
The site is no longer required for its original purpose, and Thames Water, its current owners, have submitted several plans to redevelop the site for housing. This has proved controversial in the surrounding area, largely because it has become home to a wide range of wildlife including protected species. Species sighted on the site include roe deer, badgers, owls, slow worms, muntjac, foxes, hedgehogs, and a variety of birds and butterflies.

In 2008, Thames Water submitted plans for 96 homes on the site. In 2009, Reading Borough Council rejected the plans. Thames Water filed an appeal, which was rejected in January 2011. The planning inspector stated that the development would damage "the character and appearance of the site and the wider area."

In August 2011, Thames Water announced new plans that would involve the construction of 80 homes on the site, whilst setting aside a small proportion of the land (20%) as a wildlife reserve. The new plans also involve the conversion of the water tower into residential accommodation. Consultation for these new plans opened on 24 September 2011.

On 17 October 2012, Reading Borough Council approved plans to create 84 homes on the site. The plans include extending the pump house and water tower to create 10 homes and convert the water tower into six apartments.
