= Oracle (workhouse) =

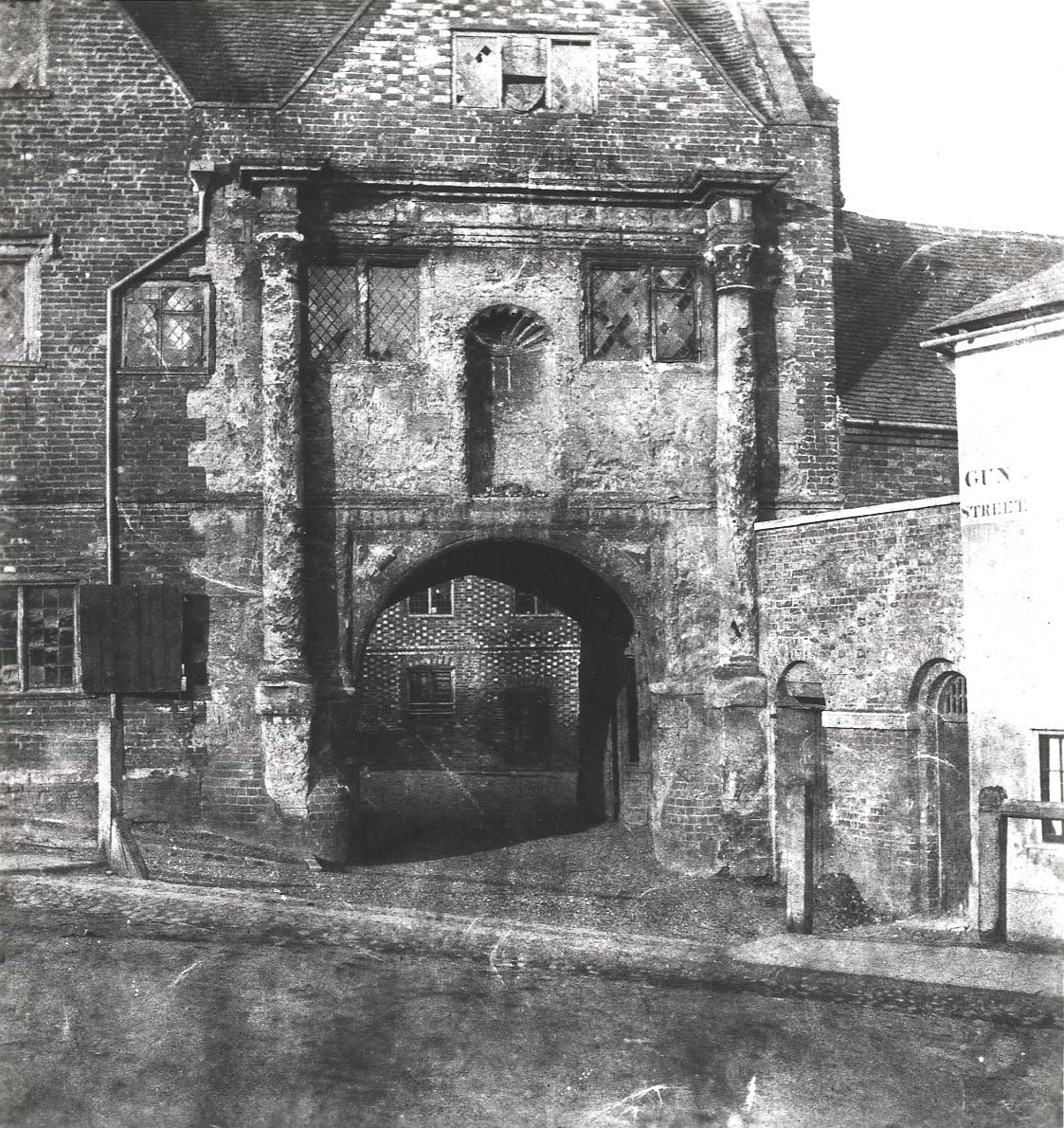
- The Oracle in Minster Street, c. 1845 by William Fox Talbot

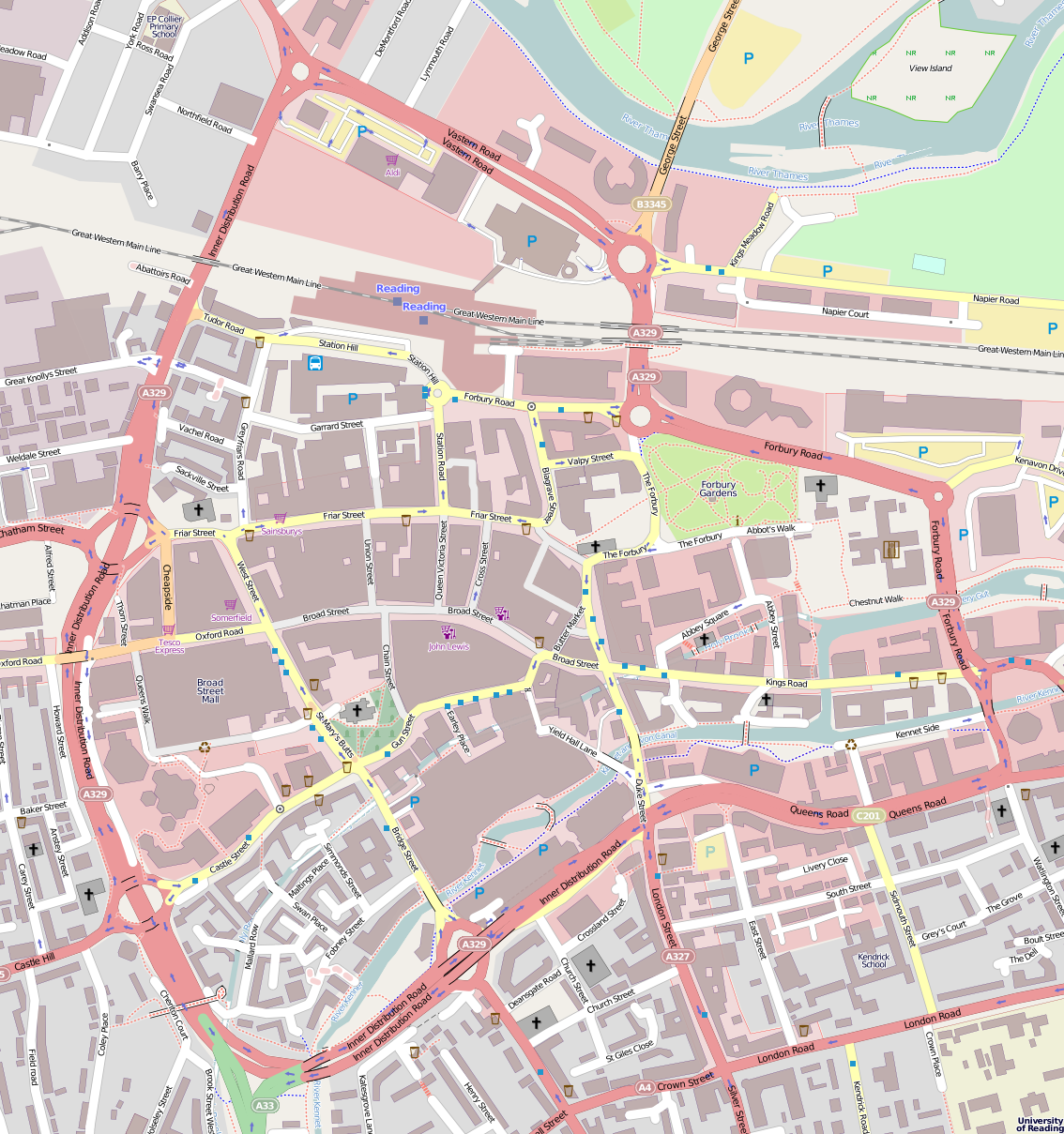
- Location within Reading Central

General information
- Type: Workhouse
- Location: Reading, Berkshire, England
- Coordinates: 51.454417°N 0.972203°W
- Completed: 1628
- Demolished: 1850

The Oracle was a workhouse that produced cloth in the English town of Reading, Berkshire. The Oracle shopping centre, which now occupies a small part of the site, takes its name from the Oracle workhouse.

== History ==
In the 17th century, clothiers in Reading were facing competition from the north of England, where taxes were lower. On 30 December 1624, John Kendrick a clothier died leaving £7,500 to Reading and £4,000 to Newbury to help their cloth industries. John Kendrick's father and brother had a textile factory in Minster Street. The factory was sold to the Council for £2,000, and alterations were carried out to make it suitable for use as a workhouse. The new facility opened in 1628. It stretched from the top of Minster Street 30 metres (98 ft) down along the Holy Brook. William Kendrick chose the name "Oracle" to honour his brother John, whose idea launched the facility.

The Oracle remained in use until the 19th century, and the building was demolished in 1850.
