= John Kendrick (cloth merchant) =

English cloth merchant and patron (1573–1624)

- "Founder of this worke house" With permission from Mrs Elms, previous Head of Kendrick School
- Born: 1573; Reading, Berkshire
- Died: 30 December 1624 (aged 51); City of London
- Resting place: St Christopher le Stocks Church, London; Nunhead Cemetery
- Occupation: Cloth merchant
- Known for: Founder of Kendrick Boys' School (benefactor of Reading School); Founder of Kendrick Girls' School
- Parent(s): Thomas Kendrick & Agnes Bye
- Relatives: John Kendrick, Lord Mayor of London (1651)

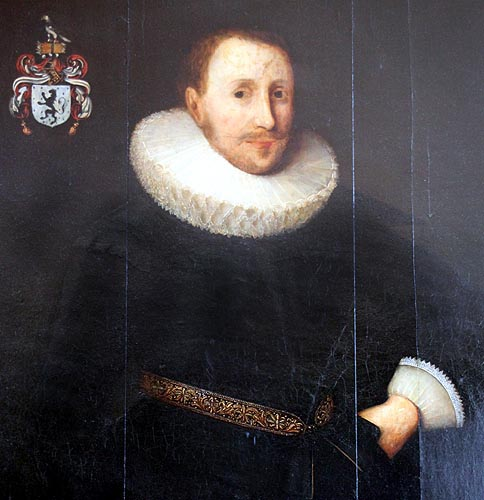
John Kendrick (1573-1624), collection of Kendrick School

John Kendrick (1573 – 30 December 1624) was a prosperous English cloth merchant and patron of the towns of Reading and Newbury in Berkshire.

== Life ==
John Kendrick was born in Reading, Berkshire, possibly in Minster Street, in 1573 to Thomas Kendrick, a prominent citizen, weaving merchant and subsequently a mayor of Reading (1580), and his wife, Agnes Bye. He was related to the Kendrick family of Chester, and the subsequent John Kendrick, Lord Mayor of London (1651). Kendrick was baptised on 18 May 1574 at nearby St Mary's Church, Reading. His younger brother William (1577-1634) was the pro-genitor of the Kendrick baronets. Together, they had at least 3 sisters: Anne, Elizabeth and Alice. Kendrick was educated at Reading School and St John's College, Oxford. After university, he moved to London, where he amassed a fortune in trade with the Netherlands.

Kendrick died on 30 December 1624 at his home in Threadneedle Street, London. He was buried at St Christopher le Stocks Church, which was demolished in 1781, and later re-buried at Nunhead Cemetery.

== Legacy ==
In his will, Kendrick left £12,500 to the towns of Reading and Newbury to provide employment and education for the poor. The Oracle workhouse, was erected in Minster Street, Reading with this money. This name was revived for the Oracle shopping mall which now occupies a small part of the site.

Although the funds left by Kendrick were mismanaged, sufficient remained for the founding of two schools: Kendrick Boys School in 1875 and Kendrick Girls School in 1877. In 1915, Kendrick Boys School was taken over by Reading School, which now has a building named the John Kendrick Building. An oil painting of John Kendrick, rescued from the Oracle workhouse, hangs in the hall of Kendrick Girls School, nowadays called Kendrick School. The caption reads "John Kendrick, founder of this worke house".

The £4,000 Kendrick left to Newbury was used to build a 'cloth manufactory' where unemployed clothworkers could be employed until the trade in the town recovered. The trade never recovered and the building went through several uses (workhouse, hospital, school, warehousing) before being restored in 1903 as the Newbury Borough Museum. Now known as the Cloth Hall, it forms a part of the West Berkshire Museum. Kendrick's cash was also used to fund a charity offering education and apprenticeships to selected children of Newbury's poor.
