= St Mary's Butts =

Street in Reading, England

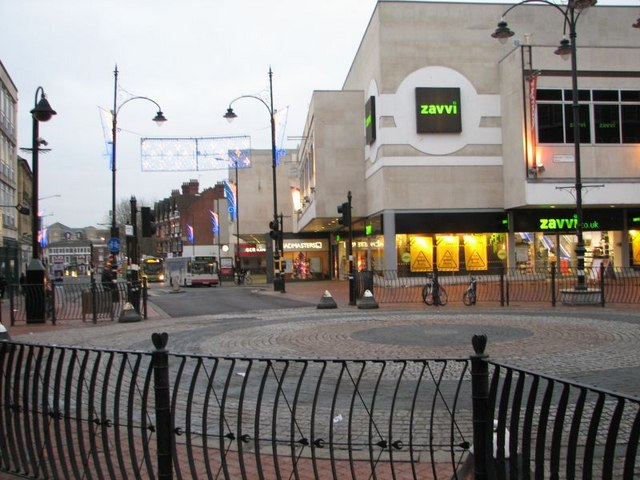
- View south from junction with Broad Street and Oxford Road
- Interactive map of St Mary's Butts
- Location: Reading, Berkshire, UK
- Postal code: RG1
- Coordinates: 51°27′16.38″N 0°58′28.42″W

St Mary's Butts is a thoroughfare in the English town of Reading, Berkshire. On its west side is the Broad Street Mall. It is connected to the north with Broad Street, the pedestrianised primary high street of Reading. St Mary's Church and Butts are where the town of Reading originally grew from.

To the south, St Mary's Butts reaches a cross-roads, where it meets Gun Street (the western continuation of Minster Street) to the east, Castle Street to the west, and Bridge Street to the south.

== History ==
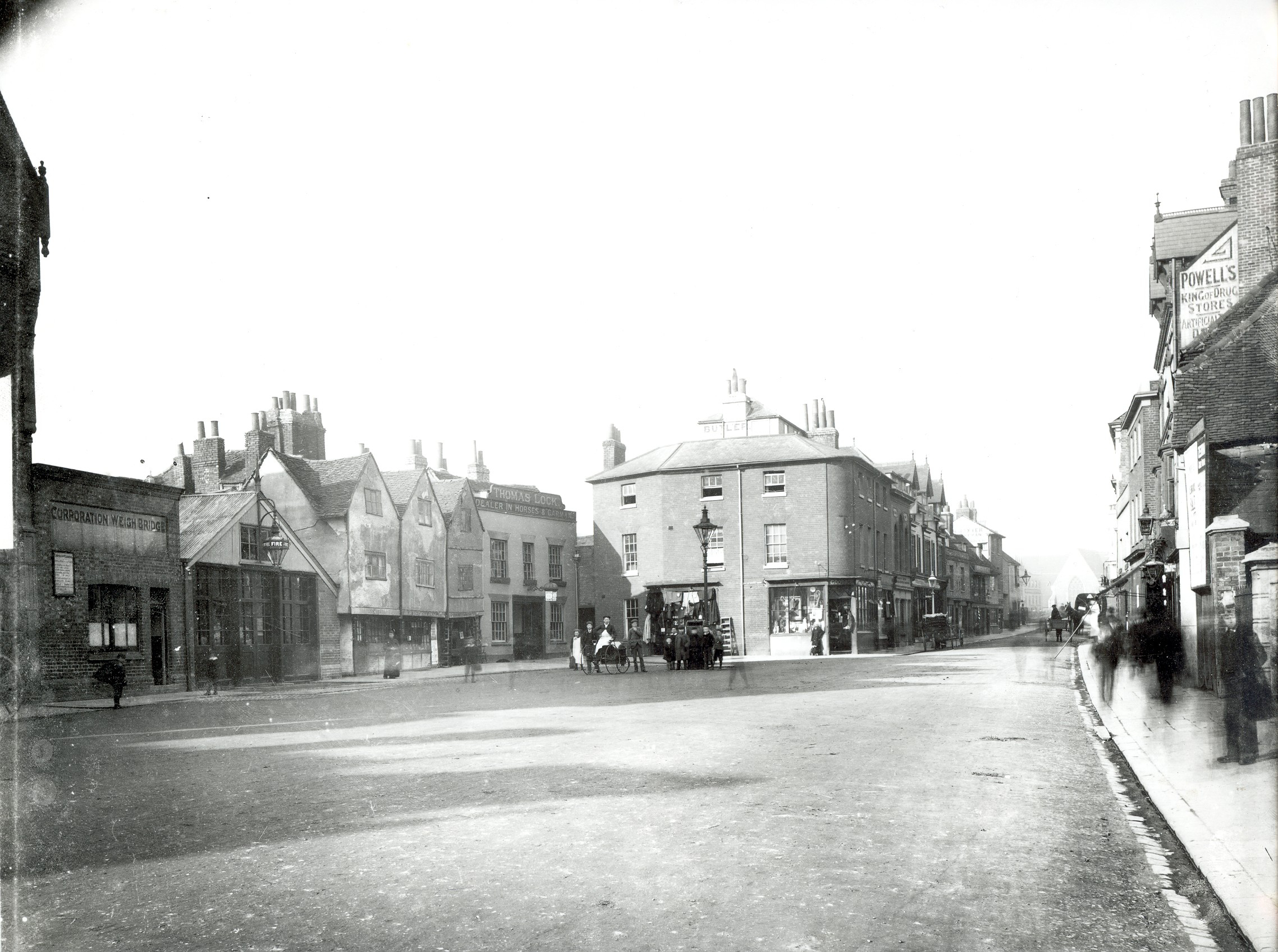
View north c. 1895

In the Middle Ages, Edward IV made it compulsory for all yeomen in England to learn archery. An archery butts was set up on the land in front of the Minster Church of St Mary the Virgin. It was used by the adult males of Reading to practice on Sundays. Some of the archers who fought at the Battle of Agincourt trained at St Mary's Butts. In 1631 the town paid £3 to have the archery grounds closed. Located in the southern end is the Jubilee Fountain, erected in 1887 for Queen Victoria's Jubilee.
