= H & G Simonds Ltd =

Former brewing company in Southern England

Coordinates: 51°27′4.89″N 0°58′29.3″W

- Industry: Alcoholic beverage
- Founded: 1785
- Founder: William Blackall Simonds
- Defunct: N/A
- Headquarters: Reading, Berkshire, UK
- Products: Beer

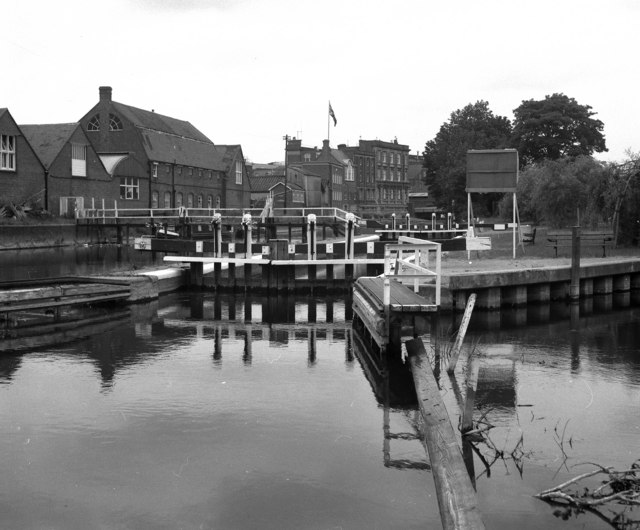
County Lock with Simonds' Brewery to left in 1975

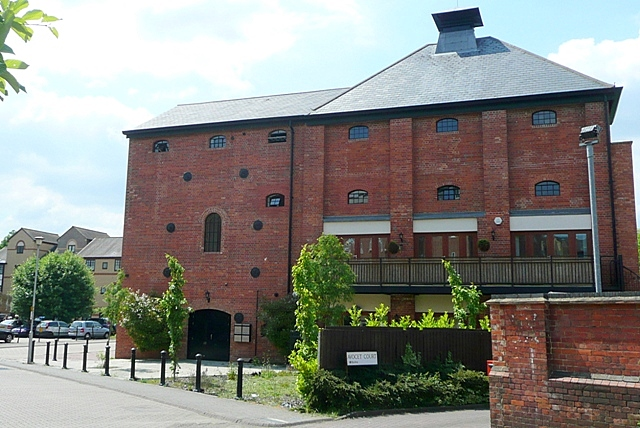
Simonds' brewery malthouse, now apartments

H & G Simonds Ltd was a brewing company founded in Reading, Berkshire, England in 1785 by William Blackall Simonds. The company amalgamated with Courage & Barclay in 1960 and dropped the Simonds name after ten years. Eventually the firm became part of Scottish & Newcastle who sold the brands to Wells & Young's Brewery in 2007 and closed the Reading brewery three years later.

== History ==
The Simonds brewery was founded in Broad Street in Reading by William Blackall Simonds in 1785, although his father had a brewing arm of his malting business as early as 1760. In 1790 the company moved to Bridge Street, where it remained until 1978. The new brewery complex was designed by architect Sir John Soane and possessed an early Boulton & Watt steam engine. Over time the brewery expanded, coming to occupy large quantities of land alongside the River Kennet on both sides of Bridge Street. The site is now occupied by The Oracle shopping centre.

Simonds developed rapidly, but expansion was held back until legislation restricting the setting up of new public houses was repealed by the Beerhouse Act 1830. Since 1813, Simonds had supplied beer to the Royal Military College, Sandhurst. In the 1850s, it expanded its reputation for supplying the military with beer, when nearby Aldershot was established as the 'home of the British Army'. This led to a branch being set up in Malta and an outlet in Gibraltar. The former still exists as the, now independent, Simonds Farsons Cisk Brewery. Simonds also supplied many of the railways in southern England. By the 1880s, Simonds was the largest brewery in Reading.

Simonds became a very early limited company in 1885, taking the name of H & G Simonds from William's two sons, Henry and George. The latter was the father of a later director, George Blackall Simonds, a sculptor.

After the First World War, Simonds expanded by acquisition, purchasing local breweries as well as others in places such as Bristol and Devonport. The hopleaf logo was introduced to all Simonds pubs in 1930. By 1938, Simonds' was producing just over one percent of all beer brewed in England and Wales. The brewery made extensive use of the canal to deliver its wares, but the railway was also an important form of transport, with the brewery having its own siding off the Coley branch line.

In 1960, the brewery amalgamated with Courage & Barclay to become Courage, Barclay, Simonds & Co Ltd until simplified to Courage Ltd in 1970. As Scottish Courage, they operated from the Berkshire Brewery on the borders of Reading and Shinfield, until it closed in March 2010. In January 2007, the rights for the production, marketing and sales of the Courage brands were sold to Wells & Young's Brewing Company of Bedford. This is managed by a venture called Courage Brands Ltd.

== Beer ==
Simonds was a pioneer of pale ale in the 1830s, including India pale ale which the company exported to the British army in India. In the 1870s, they developed a lighter beer called 'SB' (Season's Brew) and, in the following decade introduced a new system of fermentation known as the 'Burton Union Method'. Simonds were well known for their 'hopleaf' branding and Hopleaf pale ale is still available from the Simonds Farsons Cisk Brewery in Malta. Simonds branded an "India Pale Ale" as "Tavern", the name originating as "Taverner's" in a competition for employees.
