= Green Park (disambiguation) =

Green Park is one of the Royal Parks of London in the City of Westminster, Central London, England.

Green Park or Greenpark can also refer to:

== Commercial and estate properties ==
- Aston Clinton House, previously known as Green Park, the historic site of a former mansion
- Green Park Business Park, a business park in Reading, England
- Green Park Village, a residential development in Reading, England

== Places ==
- Green Park, Delhi, a locality in South Delhi district, India
- Green Park, Missouri, a city in the US
- Green Park, Pennsylvania, an incorporated village in the US
- Green Park, Reading, a suburb of Reading, England

== Sports venues ==
- Green Park Stadium, a cricket ground in Kanpur, India
- Greenpark Racecourse, Limerick, Ireland, a former racecourse

== Transportation ==
- Bath Green Park railway station, a closed Midland Railway station in the city of Bath, England
- Green Park metro station, a station on the Delhi Metro in Delhi, India
- Green Park tube station, a station on the London Underground in London. England
- Reading Green Park railway station, a railway station in Reading, England
