= Transport in Reading, Berkshire =

OpenStreetMap of Reading

Reading's location in the Thames Valley at the confluence of the River Thames and River Kennet, and on both the Great Western Main Line and the M4 motorway, some 40 miles (64 km) west of London has made the town an important location in the nation's transport system.

== River ==
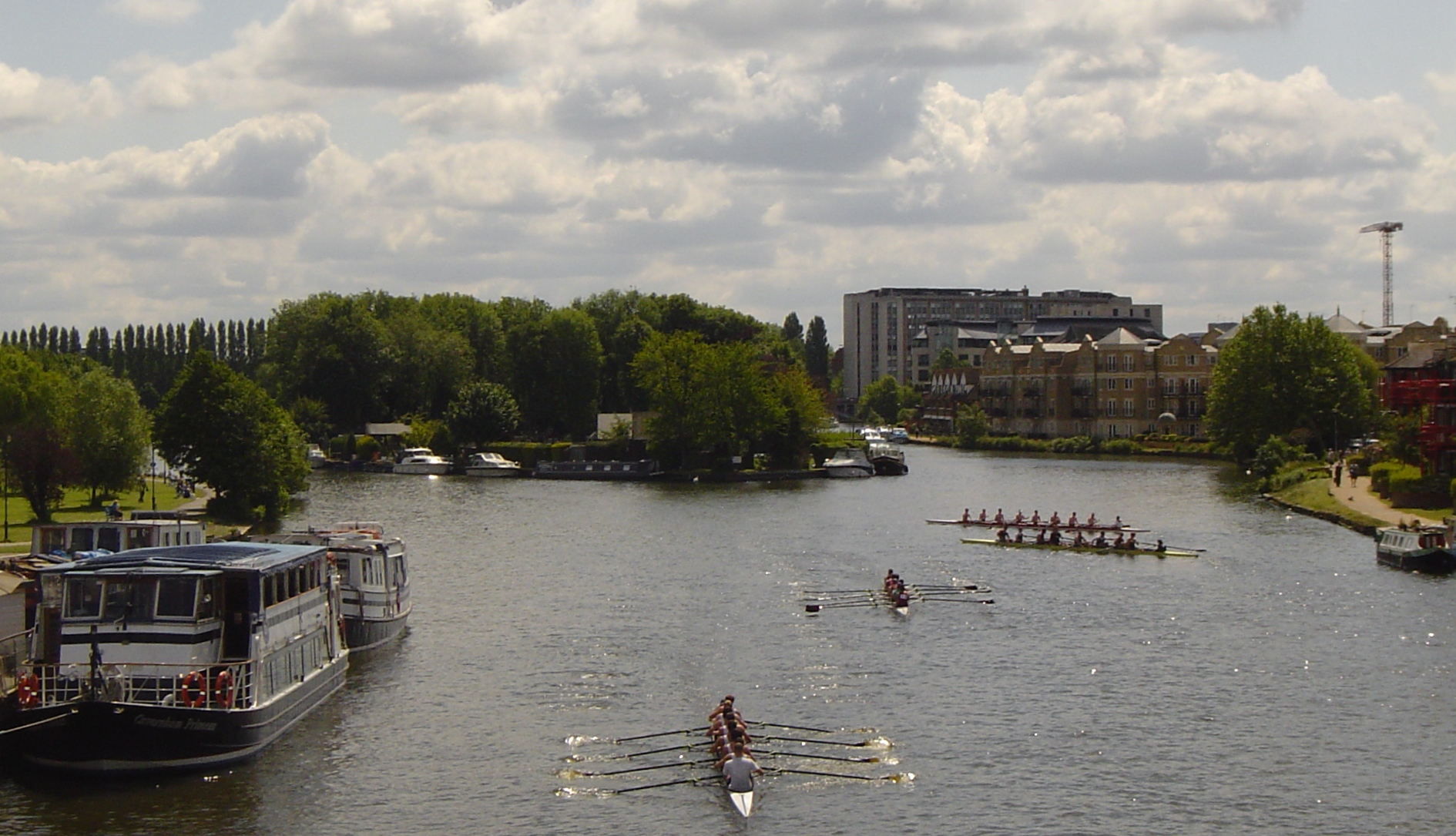
River Thames from Caversham Bridge

The town grew up as a river port at the confluence of the River Thames and River Kennet. Both of these rivers are navigable, and the locks of Caversham Lock, Blake's Lock, County Lock, Fobney Lock and Southcote Lock are all within the borough. Today navigation is exclusively leisure oriented, with private and hire boats dominating traffic.

Scheduled boat services operate on the Thames, operating from wharves on the Reading side of the river near Caversham Bridge. Salters Steamers operate a summer daily service from just downstream of the bridge to Henley-on-Thames, taking around two hours in each direction and calling at the riverside villages of Sonning and Shiplake. Thames River Cruises operate trips from just upstream of the bridge, including a service on summer weekends and bank holidays to Mapledurham, taking 45 minutes in each direction and allowing two hours ashore for visits to Mapledurham Watermill and Mapledurham House.

== Road ==
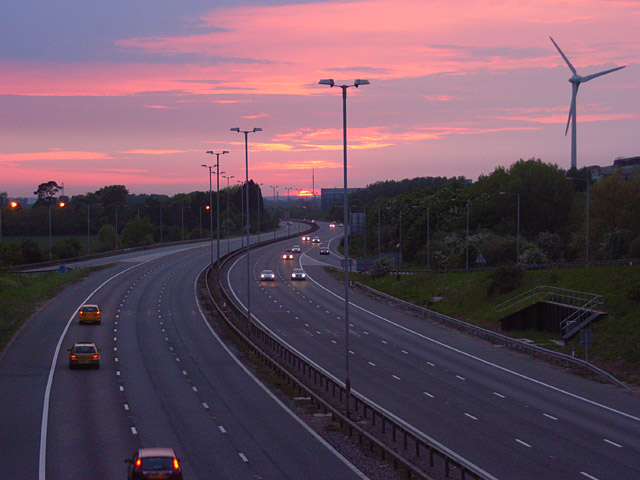
Looking west from Junction 11 of the M4 motorway near Green Park Business Park

Reading was a major staging point on the old Bath Road (A4) from London to Bath and Bristol. This road still carries local traffic, but has now been replaced for long-distance traffic by the M4 motorway, which closely skirts the borough and serves it with three junctions (J10-J12). Other main roads serving Reading include the A33 from Basingstoke, the A327 from Farnborough, the A329 from Bracknell to Thame, the A4074 to Oxford, and the A4155 to Henley-on-Thames. Within Reading there is the Inner Distribution Road (IDR), a ring road for local traffic movements. The A329(M), A33 and A4 national routes link the town with junctions 10, 11 and 12 of the M4 motorway respectively. The IDR is linked with the M4 by the A33 relief road, which runs past the Madejski Stadium and Green Park Business complex.

Reading has two operational park and ride sites. Mereoak, a short distance south of Junction 11 of the M4, is also a stop for National Express Coaches between London and the West. A site at Winnersh Triangle opened in 2015 outside the railway station and is easily accessed from the junction where the A329(M) becomes the A3290.

The River Thames is crossed by both Reading and Caversham road bridges, while several road bridges cross the Kennet. There is a long-running debate about constructing a third bridge across the Thames, to the east of the existing bridges. Some people believe that this will remove one of the town's bottlenecks and ease traffic congestion. Others believe that it will induce more traffic, move bottle necks and open up swathes of South Oxfordshire to unwanted development. However, the proximity of the county border means that any such route will have to pass through South Oxfordshire, and this development has so far been blocked by its residents and politicians.

== Rail ==
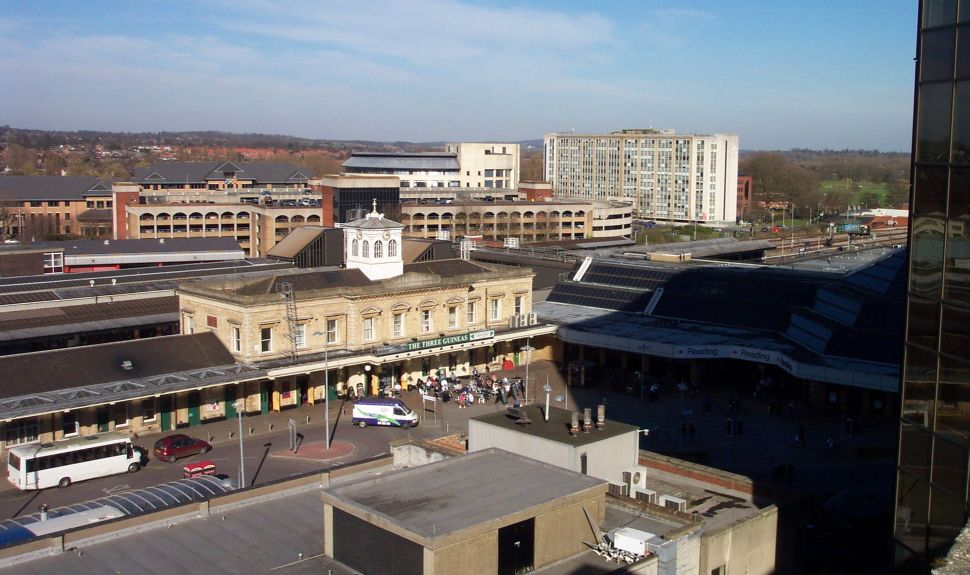
Reading Station before redevelopment. The original GWR building is now a pub called The Three Guineas

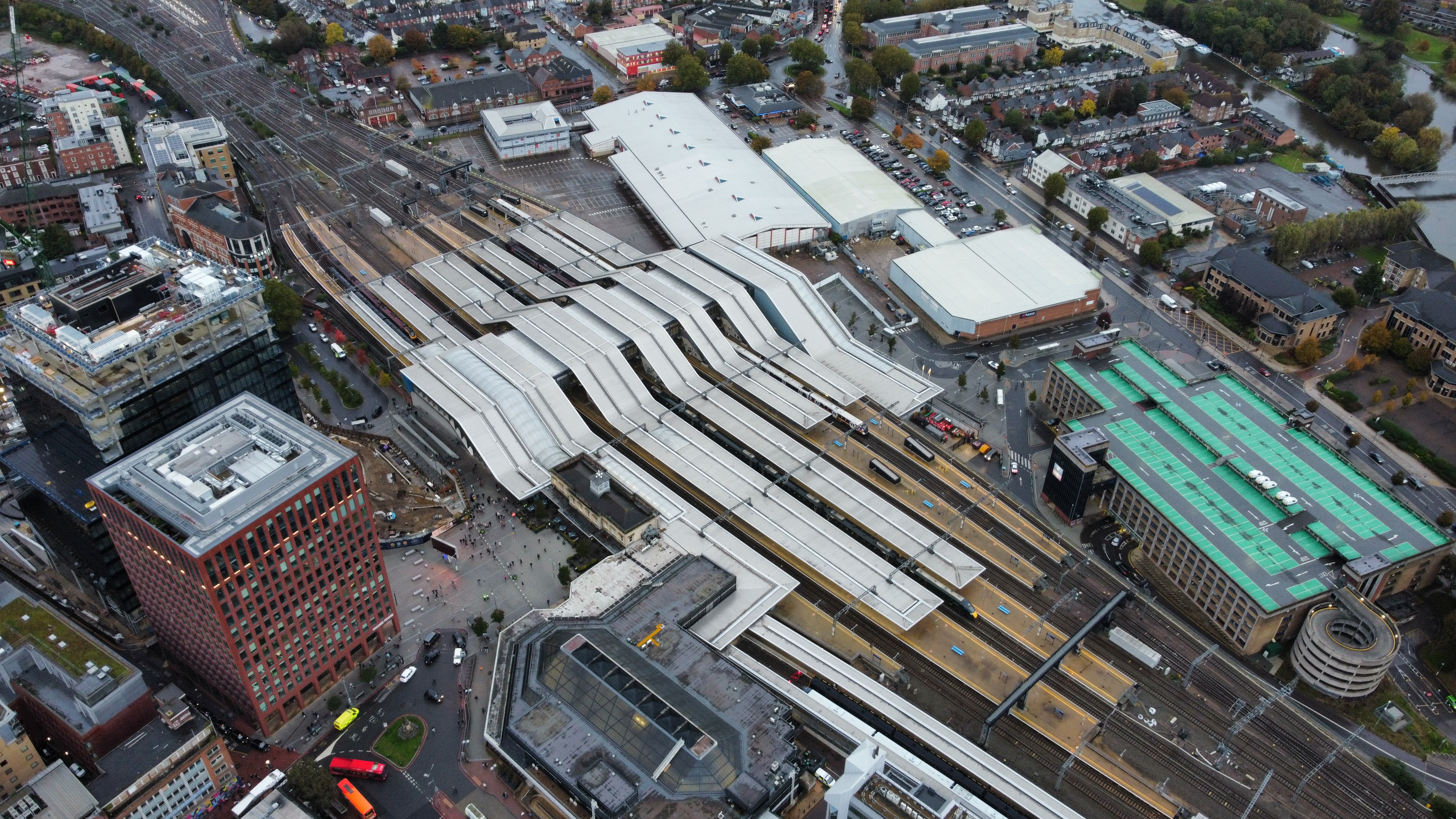
Aerial view of Reading Station taken in October 2023

Reading is a major junction point on the National Rail system, and as a consequence Reading station is a major transfer point as well as serving heavy originating and terminating traffic. Plans have been agreed to rebuild Reading station, with grade separation of some conflicting traffic flows and extra platforms, to relieve severe congestion at this station.

Railway lines link Reading to both Paddington and Waterloo stations in London. The route to Paddington offers both non-stop (typically taking between 20–25 minutes), Semi-fast and stopping services (Elizabeth line), whilst that to Waterloo offers only a stopping service, however this service does give Reading direct links with Richmond and Clapham Junction. Inter-city services also link Reading to Swindon, Bristol, Cardiff, Swansea, Exeter, Plymouth, Birmingham and the North of England as well as Southampton Central and Bournemouth. Local services link Reading to Oxford, Newbury, Basingstoke, Bracknell, Guildford and Gatwick Airport.

Other stations in the Reading area are Reading West, Reading Green Park, Tilehurst and Earley, but all serve local trains only.

Reading serves as the western terminus of Elizabeth line with services currently running through Central London to Abbey Wood.

Connections to the London Underground network can be made at London Paddington (around 20 minutes away by direct train), London Waterloo, Ealing Broadway and Richmond. The nearest London Underground station by distance from Reading is Heathrow Terminal 5 (20 miles (32 km) away), although there is no direct rail connection (see Air section below).

Since December 2019, passengers are able to use the Transport for London contactless payment system between Reading and London Paddington on both non-stop GWR services and the Elizabeth line. This is not currently available on South Western Railway services towards London Waterloo.

== Air ==
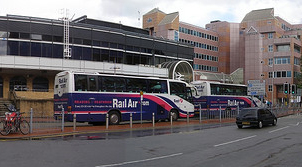
RailAir coaches on the service to Heathrow Airport outside Reading station

There have been two airfields in Reading, one at Coley Park and one at Woodley, but these have both closed. Today Reading is within reach of several international airports.

The nearest airport is London Heathrow, which is 20 miles (32 km) away. An express bus service named RailAir links Reading with Heathrow, or the airport can be accessed by taking the Elizabeth line and changing at Hayes & Harlington railway station for a connecting service to Heathrow Central, Heathrow Terminal 4 or Heathrow Terminal 5, taking around 45 minutes in total by rail.

London Gatwick is 38 miles (61 km) away and is served by direct trains from Reading. London Luton is also 38 miles (61 km) away, whilst London Stansted is 58 miles (93 km) away; both can be reached by rail by changing stations in central London. The airport at London City can also be reached semi-directly by utilizing the Elizabeth line station at Custom House, followed by a short bus journey of around 5 minutes.

Looking further afield, Southampton airport is accessible by a direct train taking between 50 and 70 minutes depending on the service. By road, Southampton Airport is approximately 43 miles (70 km) away.

== Public transport ==
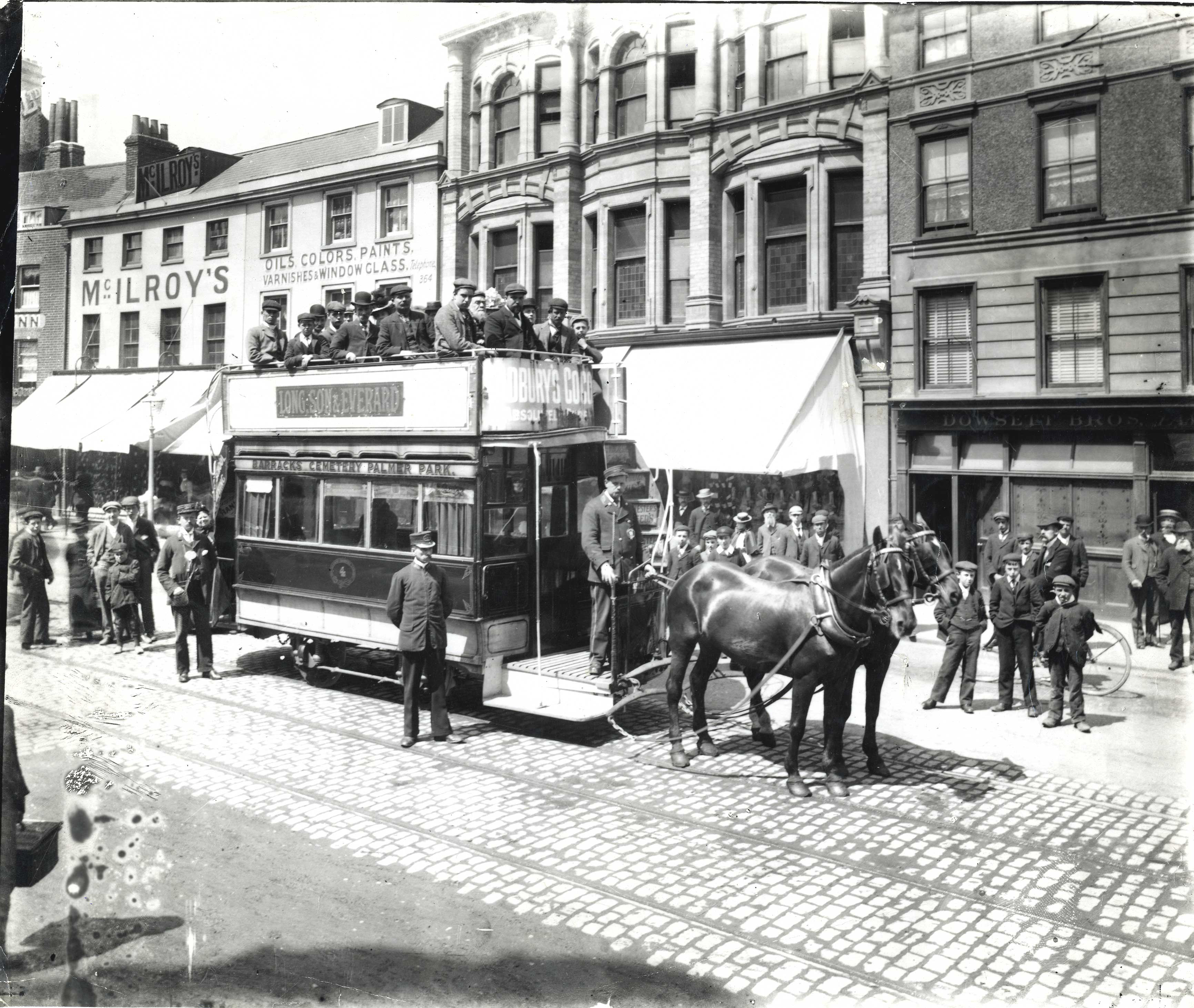
Horse tram in Broad Street, c. 1900

The first local public transport started in 1878 with the Reading Tramways Company then (part of the Imperial Tramways Company) operating a horse tram route on an east–west alignment from Oxford Road through Broad Street in the town centre to Cemetery Junction. Significantly, this route formed the core of what became known as the main line of the network.

The new electric trams started operating in July 1903. Extensions were constructed to the Wokingham Road and London Road (both from Cemetery Junction), and new routes added to Whitley, Caversham Road, Erleigh Road and Bath Road. The trams operated from a new depot in Mill Lane, a site that was to remain Reading Buses' main depot until it was demolished to make way for The Oracle shopping mall in 1998.

The first trolleybus wiring erected was a training loop on Erleigh Road, which opened in early 1936. During World War II a trolleybus branch was constructed from the Oxford Road to Kentwood Hill, enabling trolleybuses to replace motor buses with a consequential saving in precious oil based fuel. Reading Corporation decided to abandon the trolleybus system, and the routes were phased out between January 1967 and November 1968.

Today local public transport is largely road-based, and can be affected by peak hour congestion in the borough. A frequent local bus network within the borough, and a less frequent network in the surrounding area, is provided by Reading Buses. Other bus operators include First Beeline, Arriva Shires & Essex, RedRose and Thames Travel. ReadiBus provides an on-demand transport service for people with restricted mobility in the area.

Since 2004, Reading Transport and Reading Borough Council have made a significant investment in upgrading the quality of Reading's main urban bus routes. In late 2007, Reading Buses placed an order with Scania for 14 new ethanol fuelled double decker buses to replace the existing fleet of biodiesel powered vehicles operating premier route 17. At the time the order was placed, this was the largest order for ethanol fuelled buses in the UK. These buses started work on 26 May 2008. Since then, a large proportion of the Reading Buses fleet has been upgraded to Hybrid or Natural Gas power across a number of large orders.

== Cycling ==
The OYBike bicycle sharing system operated in Reading, with approximately 15 bicycles with docking stations at Reading station, Holiday Inn (Basingstoke Road) and Green Park. In March 2011 Reading Borough Council approved a larger scheme similar to the London Cycle Hire Scheme, with 1,000 bicycles available at up to 150 docking stations across Reading. The scheme, ReadyBike, began in 2014 but closed on 31 March 2019. After an initial government funding subsidy ended it was being subsidised by Reading Borough Council by £10,000 per month.

Several major cycle routes in Sustrans' National Cycle Network cross at Reading. These include National Cycle Route 4 between London and Fishguard, National Cycle Route 5 from Oxford and Birmingham, and National Cycle Route 23 from Basingstoke and Southampton.
