= Greenpark =

Greenpark may refer to:

- Greenpark Racecourse, a former racecourse in Limerick, Ireland
- Green Park Business Park, Reading, United Kingdom

== See also ==
- Green Park (disambiguation)
