= Whitley, Reading =

Suburb of Reading, Berkshire, England

Coordinates: 51.42800°N 0.96145°W

Whitley
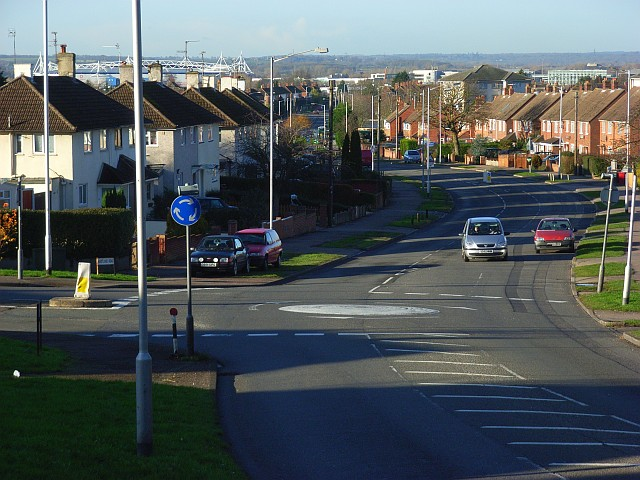
- View down Hartland Road with Madejski Stadium in the background

- Location within Berkshire
- OS grid reference: SU723704
- Unitary authority: Reading
- Ceremonial county: Berkshire
- Region: South East
- Country: England
- Sovereign state: United Kingdom
- Post town: READING
- Postcode district: RG2
- Dialling code: 0118
- Police: Thames Valley
- Fire: Royal Berkshire
- Ambulance: South Central
- UK Parliament: Earley and Woodley

Whitley is a suburban neighbourhood of the town of Reading, Berkshire, England.

== Geography ==
Whitley, one of the larger suburbs of Reading, is bounded to the north and east by a ridge of high ground carrying the road to Shinfield, to the west by the A33 relief road, and to the south by an ill-defined boundary with the suburb of Whitley Wood.

The former main road to Basingstoke passes just to the west of the centre of Whitley, dividing largely residential areas to its east from a largely industrial zone to its west. However recent developments, most notably the building of the Kennet Island housing development on a former sewage works, have blurred this distinction.

== History ==
Historically, Whitley was a hamlet outside the Reading borough limits, but within the parish of the church of St Giles in Reading.

== Government ==
The Borough of Reading is responsible for all local government. The geographical centre of the neighbourhood of Whitley, as depicted on Ordnance Survey maps, lies in that borough's Church ward, with only a small part of the neighbourhood in Whitley ward, which largely covers areas to the west and south of Whitley itself. The more northerly parts of Whitley are in Katesgrove and Redlands wards.

Most of Whitley is within the parliamentary constituency of Earley and Woodley, although some of the more northerly areas are in Reading Central.

== Notable people ==
- Ricky Gervais, comedian, actor, film director and producer, musician and writer.
- Midge Ure, musician, whilst a member of Slik in 1974 lived briefly on Hexham Road.
- M. L. Emmett, poet, editor, and convenor of Friendly Street Poets Inc.
- Liam Bridcutt, footballer.
