= Kennet Island =

Housing development in Reading, England

Coordinates: 51.43101°N 0.97533°W

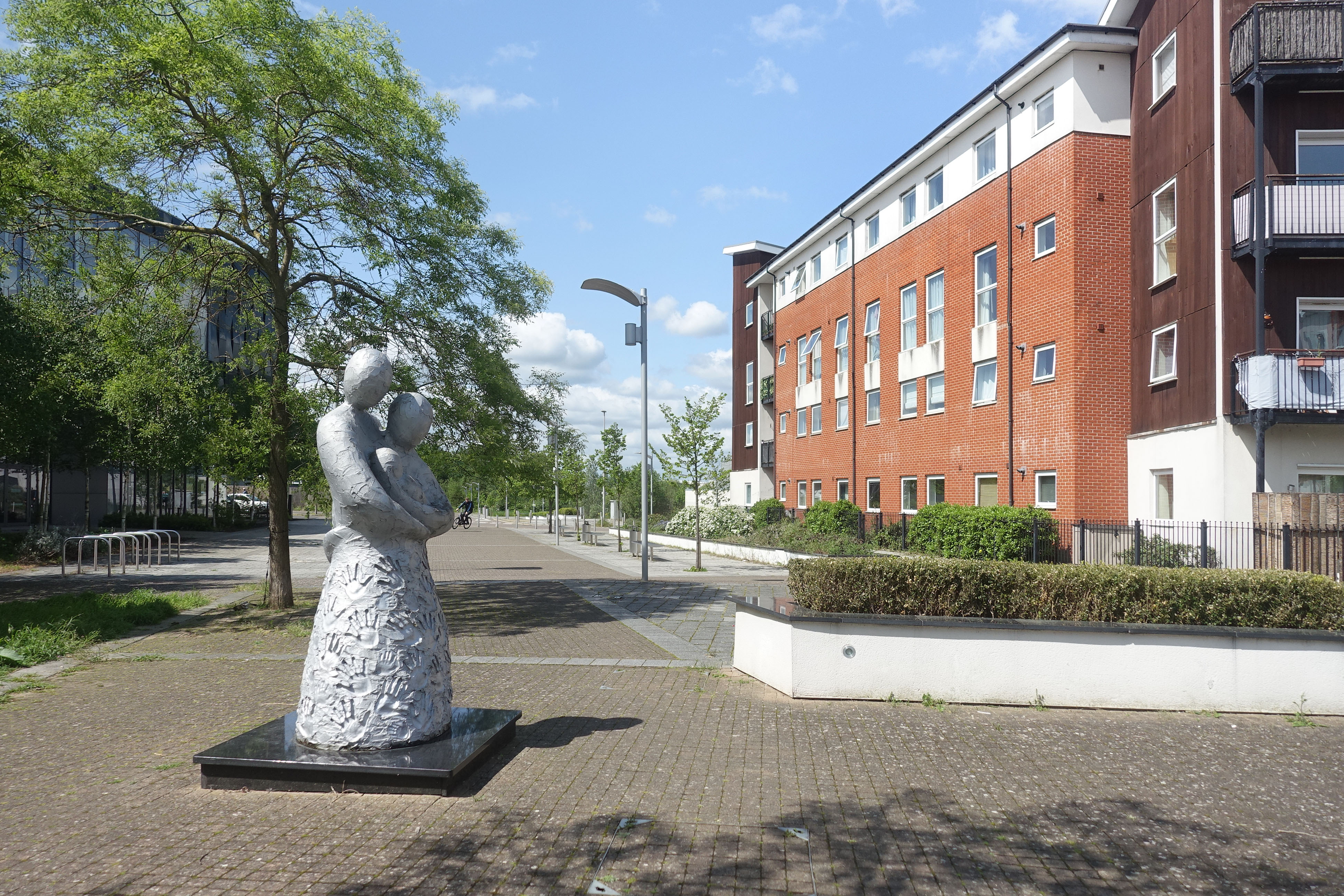
- Lindisfarne Way in Kennet Island

- Location within Berkshire
- OS grid reference: SU698701
- Unitary authority: Reading
- Ceremonial county: Berkshire
- Region: South East
- Country: England
- Sovereign state: United Kingdom
- Police: Thames Valley
- Fire: Royal Berkshire
- Ambulance: South Central
- UK Parliament: Earley and Woodley

Kennet Island is a housing development in the English town of Reading. It is situated on the eastern side of the A33 road and the Foudry Brook, some 2.4 kilometres (1.5 mi) south of Reading town centre. It is situated on a brownfield site, the former Manor Farm Sewage Works. It is surrounded to the north by the Fobney Meadows Wildlife Conservation Area, and to the east and south by an industrial and commercial area.

Kennet Island lies entirely within the borough of Reading, in Whitley ward. It is a part of Earley and Woodley parliamentary constituency.

== History ==
The Manor Farm Sewage Works were built in 1873, with rebuilds in 1925 and 1963, and were later operated by Thames Water, forming the principal sewage works for the town of Reading. The works were perhaps best known as the source of the "Whitley Whiff", an unpleasant smell described as an "invisible malodorous mist" that often affected south Reading over the years.

The role of dealing with Reading's sewage was transferred to the new Island Road sewage works on the opposite side of the A33 in 2004, with the new site using the UK's first enclosed sludge digesters to minimise smells. Land remediation of the Kennet Island site began the same year.

Planning permission was granted in 2007 for the construction of 1,150 dwellings on a site covering 37 hectares (91 acres).

== Facilities ==
Kennet Island has a mixture of apartments and houses. There are a number of retail outlets, including a café bar and coffee shop (Fidget & Bob), a convenience store, a hair salon, and a residents' gym, which are situated around the development's central plaza. It is also home to Reading's Hilton Hotel and the Circle Reading Hospital.

Like many housing developments, much of the public realm within the development are the responsibility of a management company and funded by service charge levied on all residents. Amongst the facilities provided in this way are several play parks and recreation greens.

As a result of one of the conditions for planning permission, the management company is also responsible for the Fobney Meadows Wildlife Conservation Area, running alongside the A33 up to the north point of Kennet Island. This area contains wild flowers to attract insects and bees, as well as wetlands and ponds for aquatic life, bird and bat boxes.

== Transport ==
The principal road access to and from Kennet Island is via a bridge across the Foudry Brook to a junction with the A33. There are also road connections to Manor Farm Road (to the east) and Commercial Road (to the south), although the neighbourhood's road network is designed to discourage through traffic.

Greenwave 50/50a buses, operated by Reading Buses, provide a service to both Reading town centre and the Green Park Business Park, with stops within Kennet Island. More frequent services are available from stops outside the development on the A33 and on Basingstoke Road.

== Gallery ==
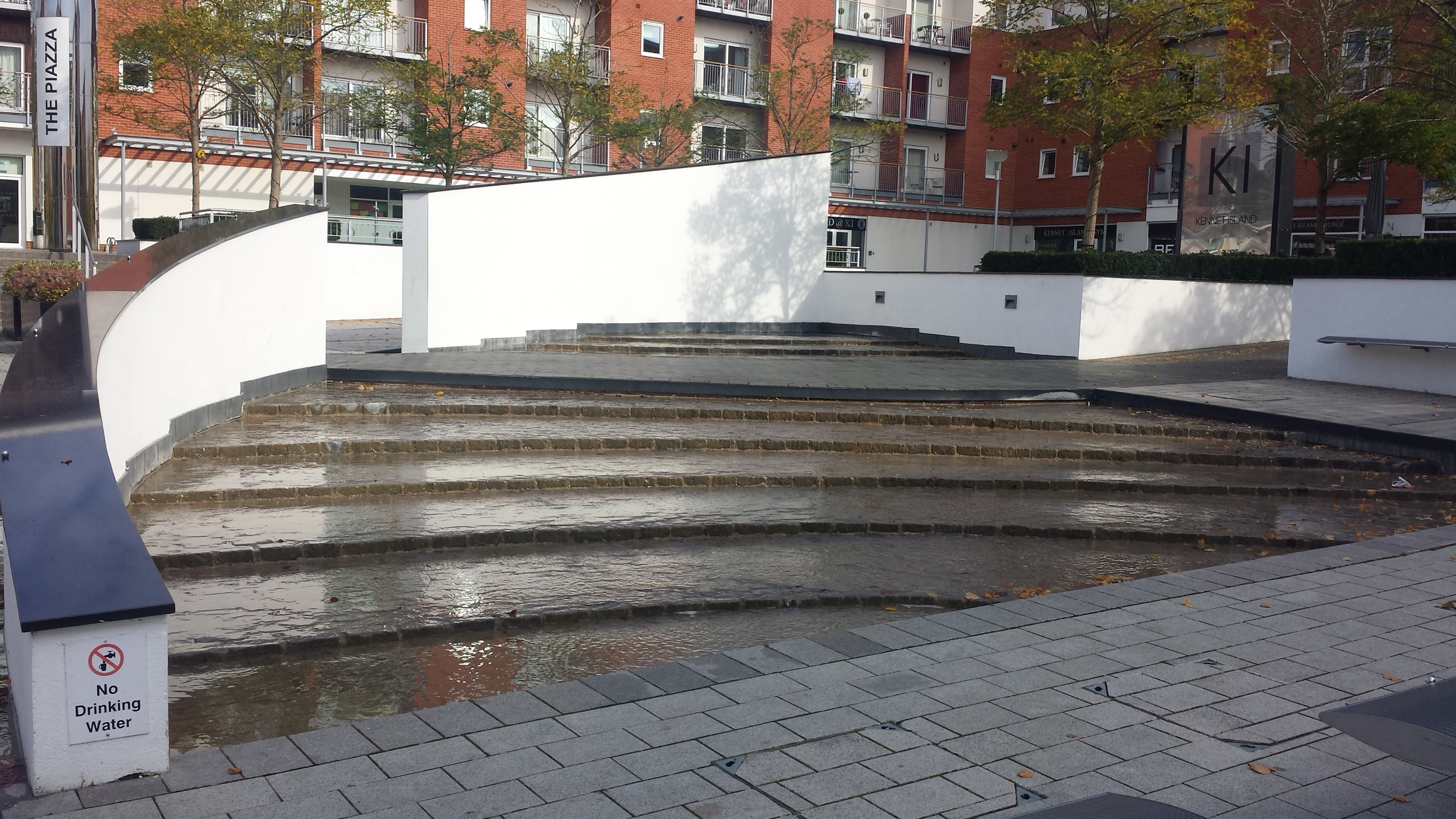
Central Plaza water feature

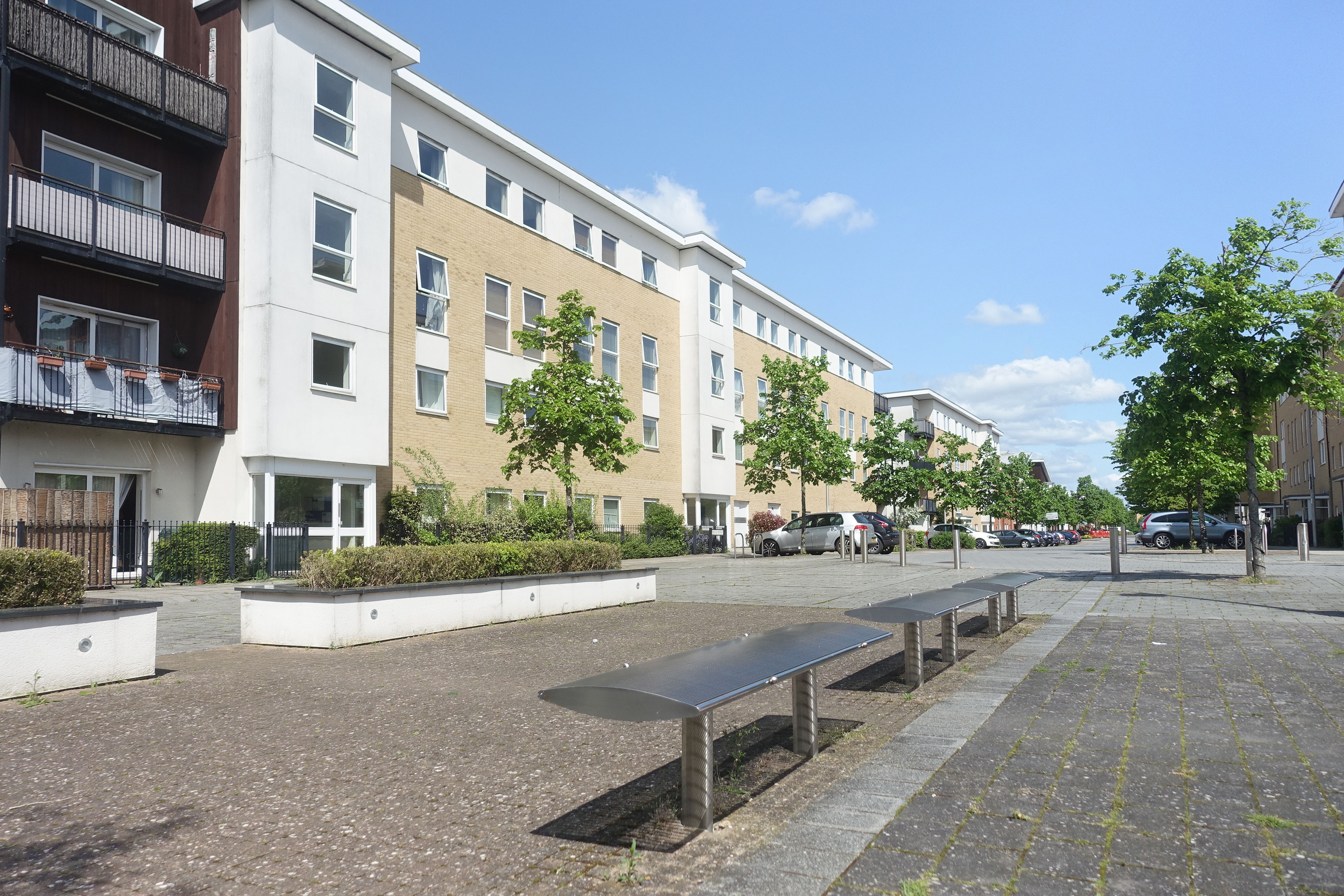
Whale Avenue

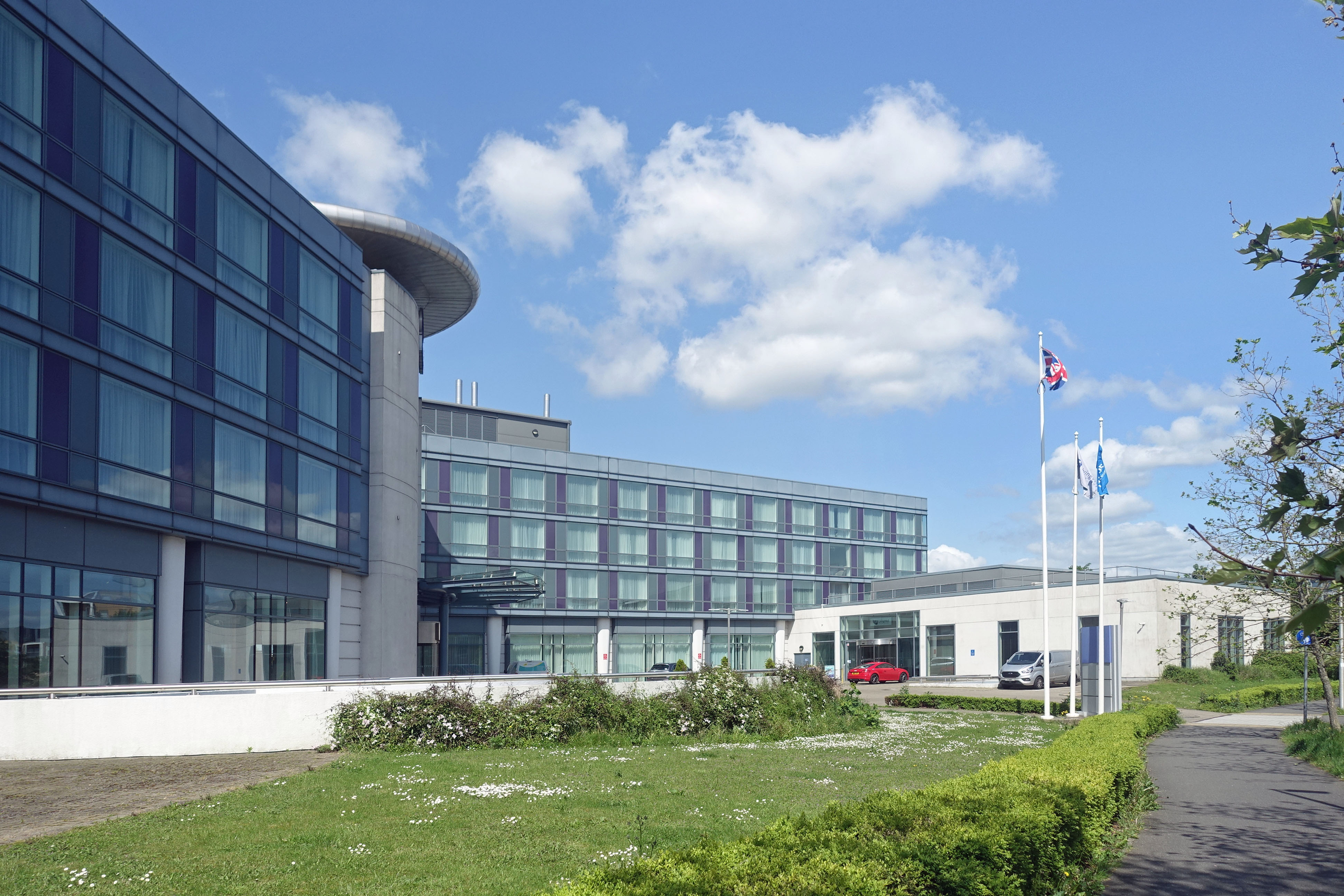
The Reading Hilton Hotel

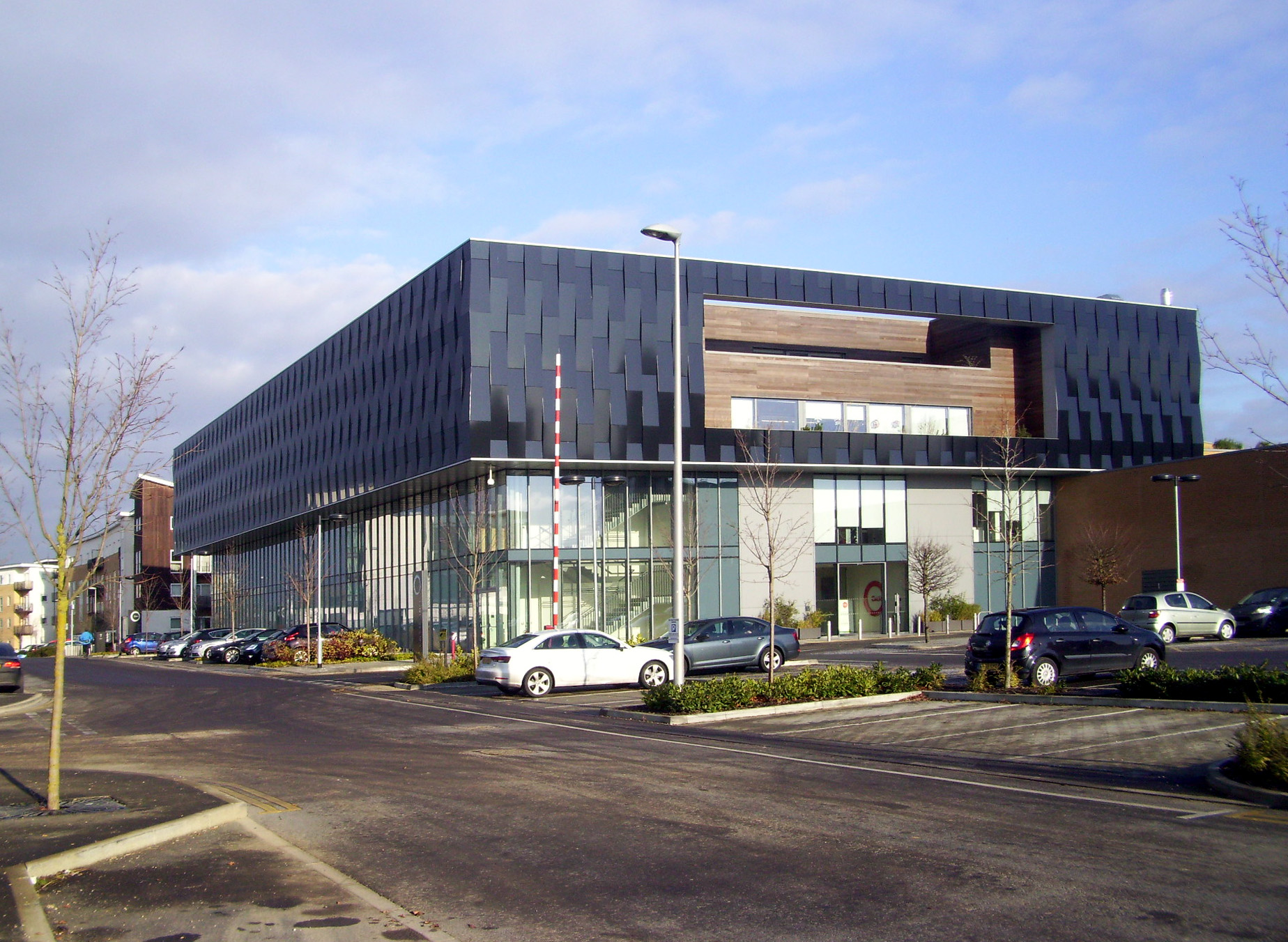
Circle Reading Hospital
