= Reading Transport =

Reading Transport may refer to:

- Reading Buses, bus operator in England that traded as Reading Transport until 1991
- Reading Company, former railroad in Pennsylvania
- Transport in Reading, Berkshire
