= Green Park, Reading =

Suburb of Reading, Berkshire, England

Coordinates: 51°25′28″N 0°59′29″W

Green Park
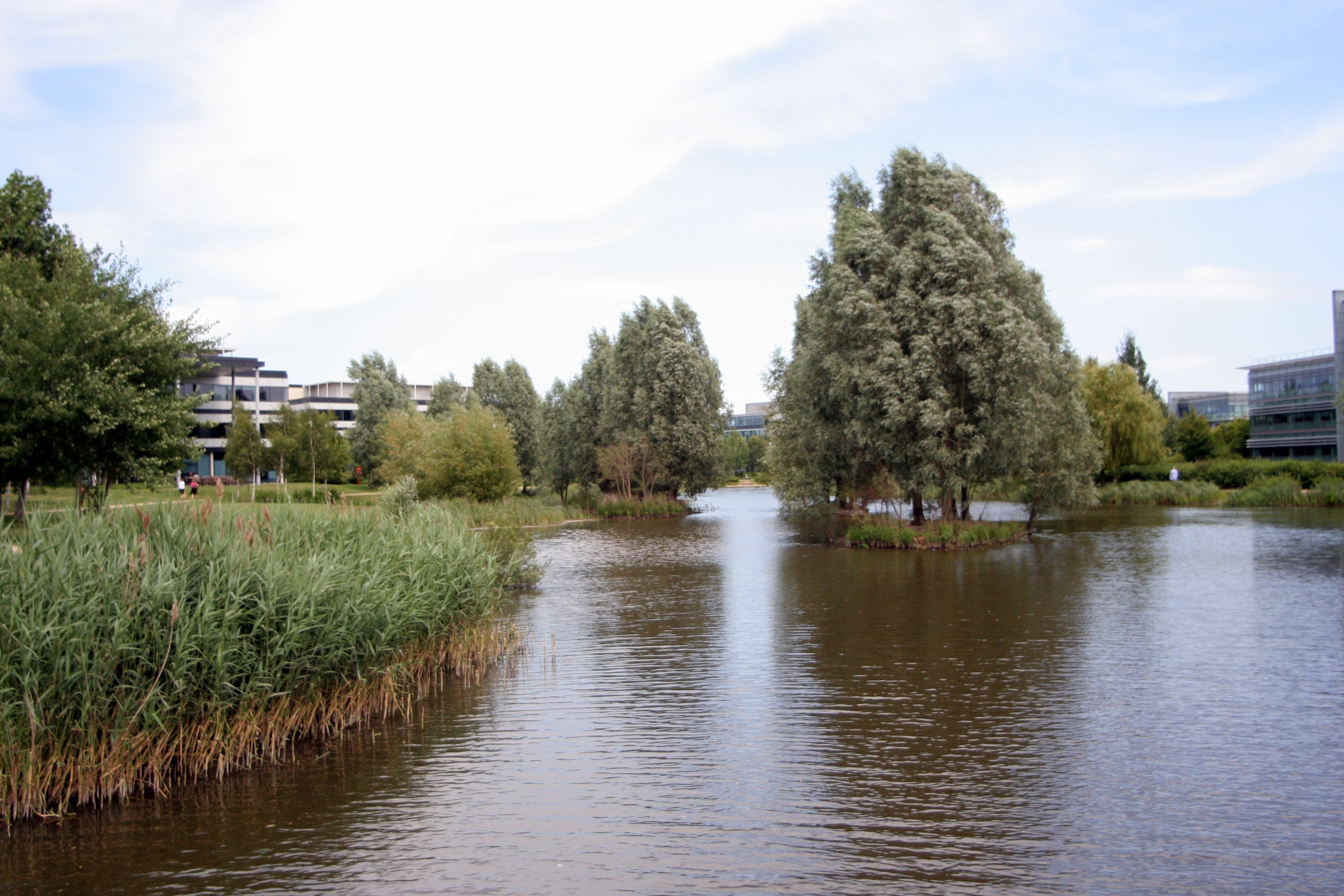
- The lakes of Green Park make a virtue of the necessity of flood alleviation measures

- Location within Berkshire
- OS grid reference: SU698701
- Unitary authority: Reading
- Ceremonial county: Berkshire
- Region: South East
- Country: England
- Sovereign state: United Kingdom
- Police: Thames Valley
- Fire: Royal Berkshire
- Ambulance: South Central
- UK Parliament: Earley and Woodley

Green Park is a recently developed suburban neighbourhood of the town of Reading in the English county of Berkshire. Initially conceived as a business park, it now also encompasses a residential development of more than 1,300 new homes, including apartment blocks and "New-England" style houses. There are also shops, restaurants, a school and a new railway station. The Madejski Stadium, home of Reading Football Club, adjoins Green Park to the east.

Green Park is bounded by the M4 motorway to the south, the Madejski Stadium and the A33 road to the east, the floodplain of the River Kennet to the north, and the Reading to Basingstoke railway line to the west. From a local government perspective it is largely located within the borough of Reading, but parts lie within the civil parish of Shinfield, in the borough of Wokingham, and the civil parish of Burghfield, in West Berkshire. However the residential components are all within Whitley ward of the borough of Reading.

== The business park ==
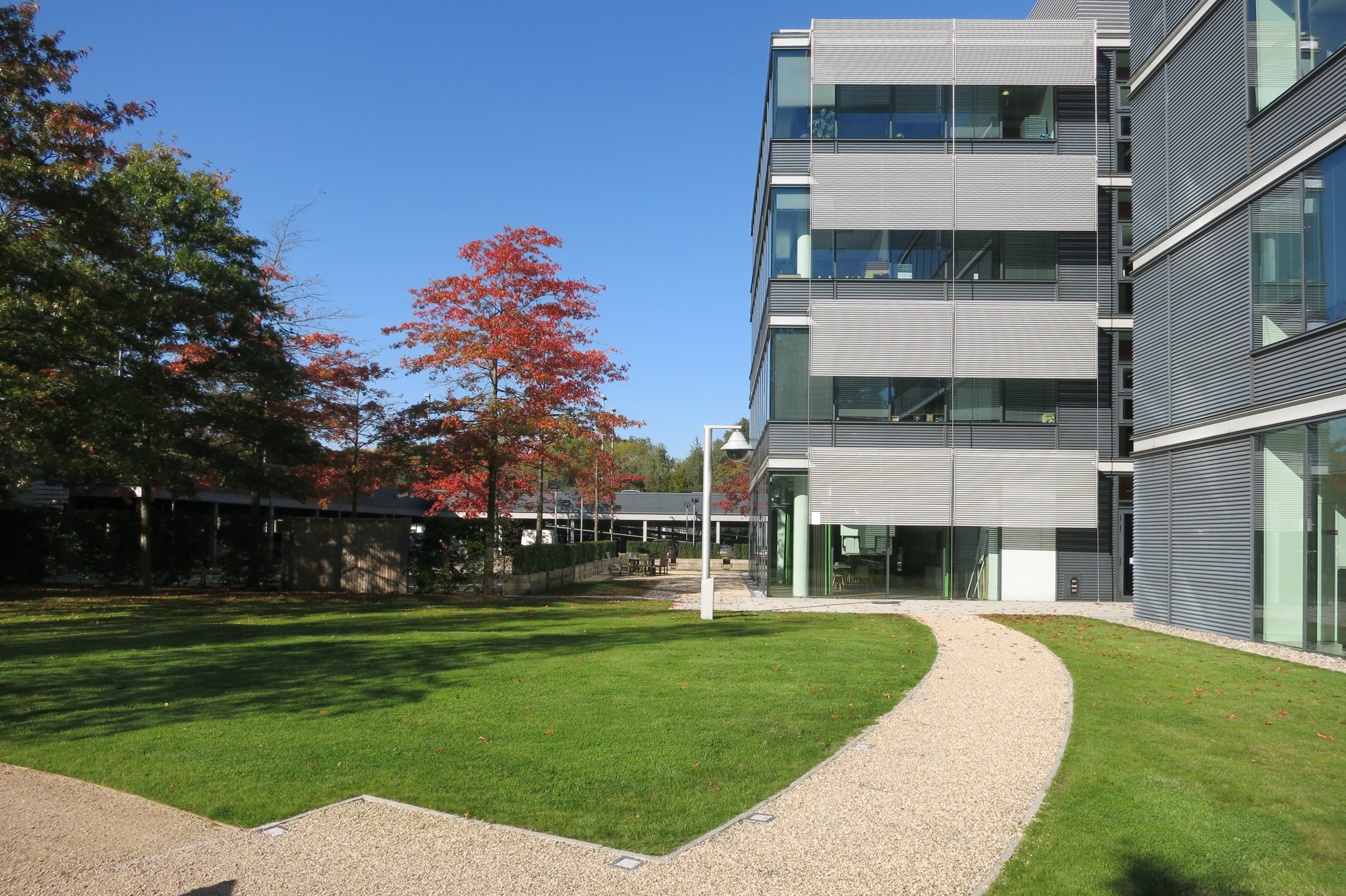
Offices in Green Park business park

The business park was the first component of Green Park to be developed, and it opened in 1999. It is currently owned by Mapletree and covers 195 acres (79 ha) and comprises 19 office buildings arranged around the Longwater, a central lake and wildlife habitat. The buildings provide 1,500,000 square feet (140,000 m^{2}) of office space, and in excess of 6,500 people work on site.

== The village ==
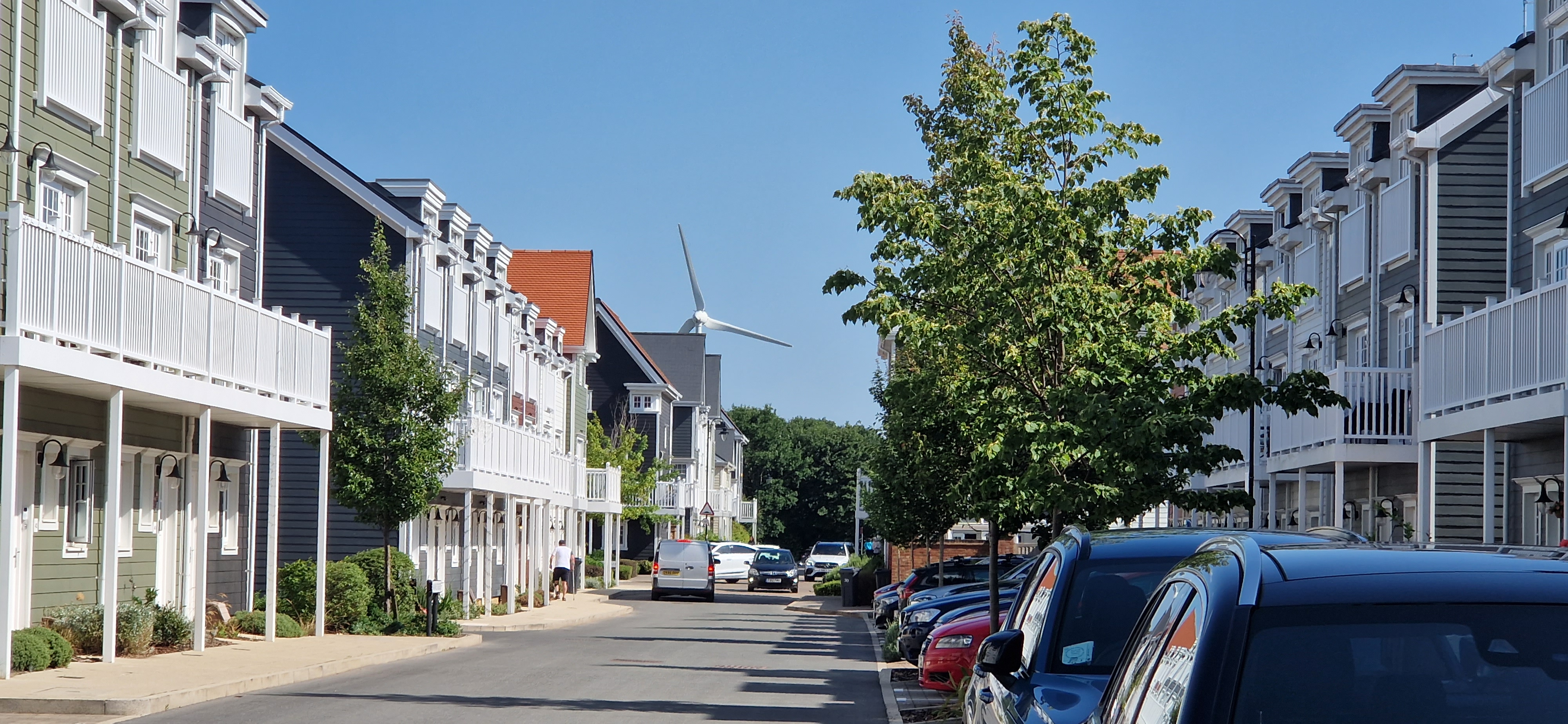
Maine Street in Green Park Village

Green Park Village is the residential component of Green Park, situated to the north of the business park and to the east of the railway station. Development started in 2016 and the initial phases are now complete and occupied. When fully complete the village is expected to contain more than 1,300 new homes, including both apartments and "New-England" style houses surrounding South Lake.

== Transport ==
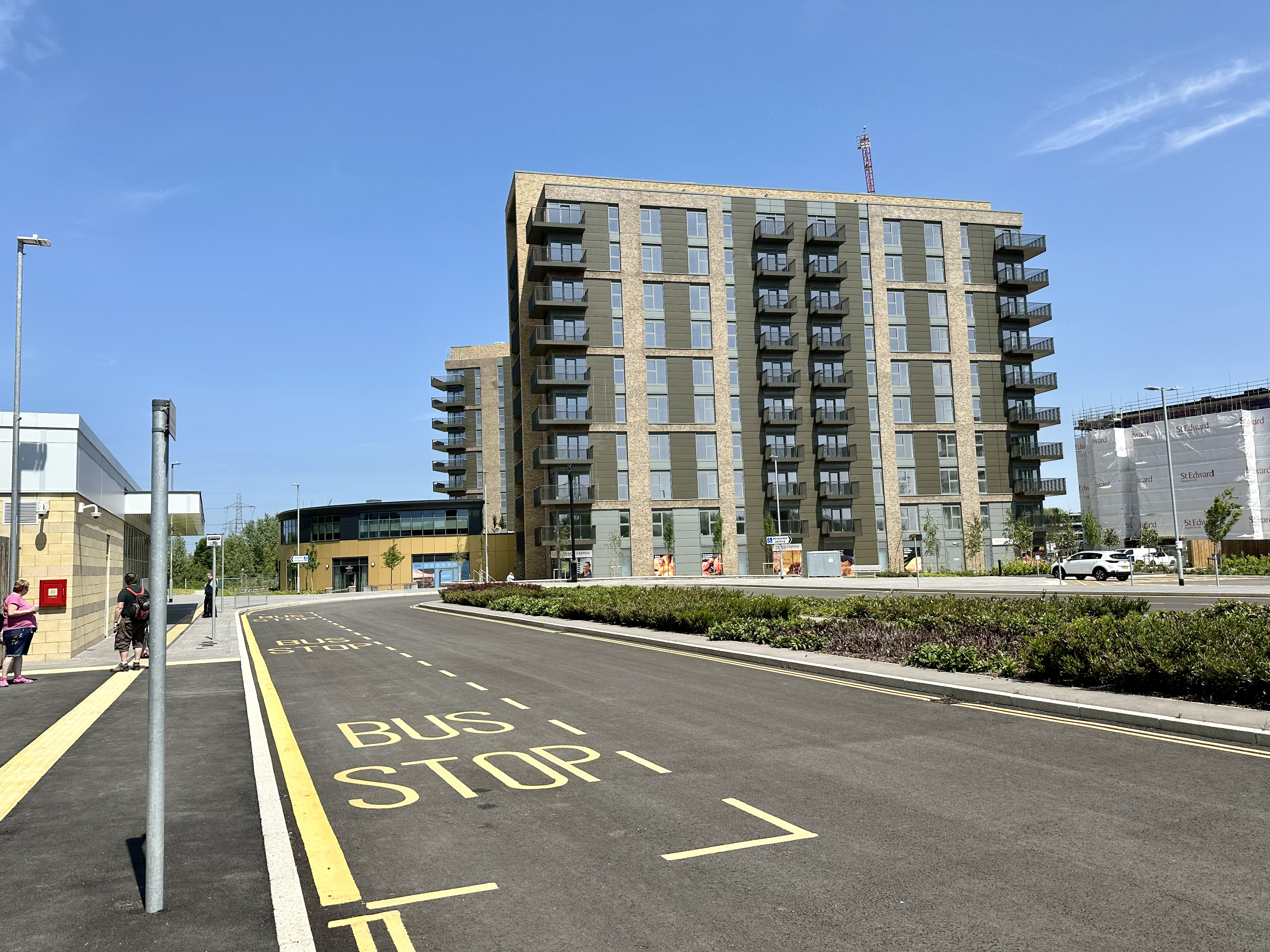
Reading Green Park station (left), with apartment blocks that form part of Green Park Village

Reading Green Park railway station opened in 2023 and lies to the west of the residential village and the north-west of the business park, being linked to both by largely off-road walking routes. It also serves the Madejski Stadium, which is about 20 minutes distant over a walking route that passes through the business park. The station is on the Reading to Basingstoke Line, south of Southcote Junction. Local trains operated by Great Western Railway between Reading and Basingstoke serve the station, with two trains per hour in both directions on weekdays and Saturdays, and one train per hour on Sundays.

By road, Green Park is accessed from two junctions off the A33 road, respectively 0.7 miles (1.1 km) and 0.9 miles (1.4 km) north of junction 11 of the M4 motorway, and 2.4 miles (3.9 km) and 2.6 miles (4.2 km) south of Reading town centre. Bus route Greenwave 50, operated by Reading Buses, connects both business park and residential village to Reading town centre. Bus frequencies vary from 6 per hour during weekday peak periods, with 4 per hour for most of the day, to every 45 minutes on Saturdays. There is no service on Sundays and public holidays.

Route 23 of the National Cycle Network follows a traffic-free routing through the centre of the business park, on its way from Reading to Basingstoke.

== Facilities ==
Most of the facilities for Green Park are located in two areas, one in the north-west close to the railway station and residential village, and the other around Lime Square in the south-east of the business park. Whilst the two facilities are primarily aimed at residents and workers respectively, both are available to both groups and are about 20 minutes walk apart.

The facilities immediately adjacent to the station include a residents club and a Tesco Express supermarket. Additionally there is a school, Green Park Village Primary Academy, and a lake side café, Triple Two Coffee, both situated within 5 minutes walk around South Lake from the station.

Lime Square offers a day nursery, Childbase, for pre-school children, as well as a play area for children up to 10 years, The Mad House Play & Party World. There is also a Nuffield Health Fitness & Wellbeing Centre, a waterside brasserie called Zest at Lime Square, an Asda Click & Collect, and a WH Smith store. A Costco stores lies to the east of Lime Square.
