= Whitley (Reading ward) =

Electoral ward in Reading, Berkshire, England

Coordinates: 51.425047°N 0.975043°W

Whitley Ward, Borough of Reading
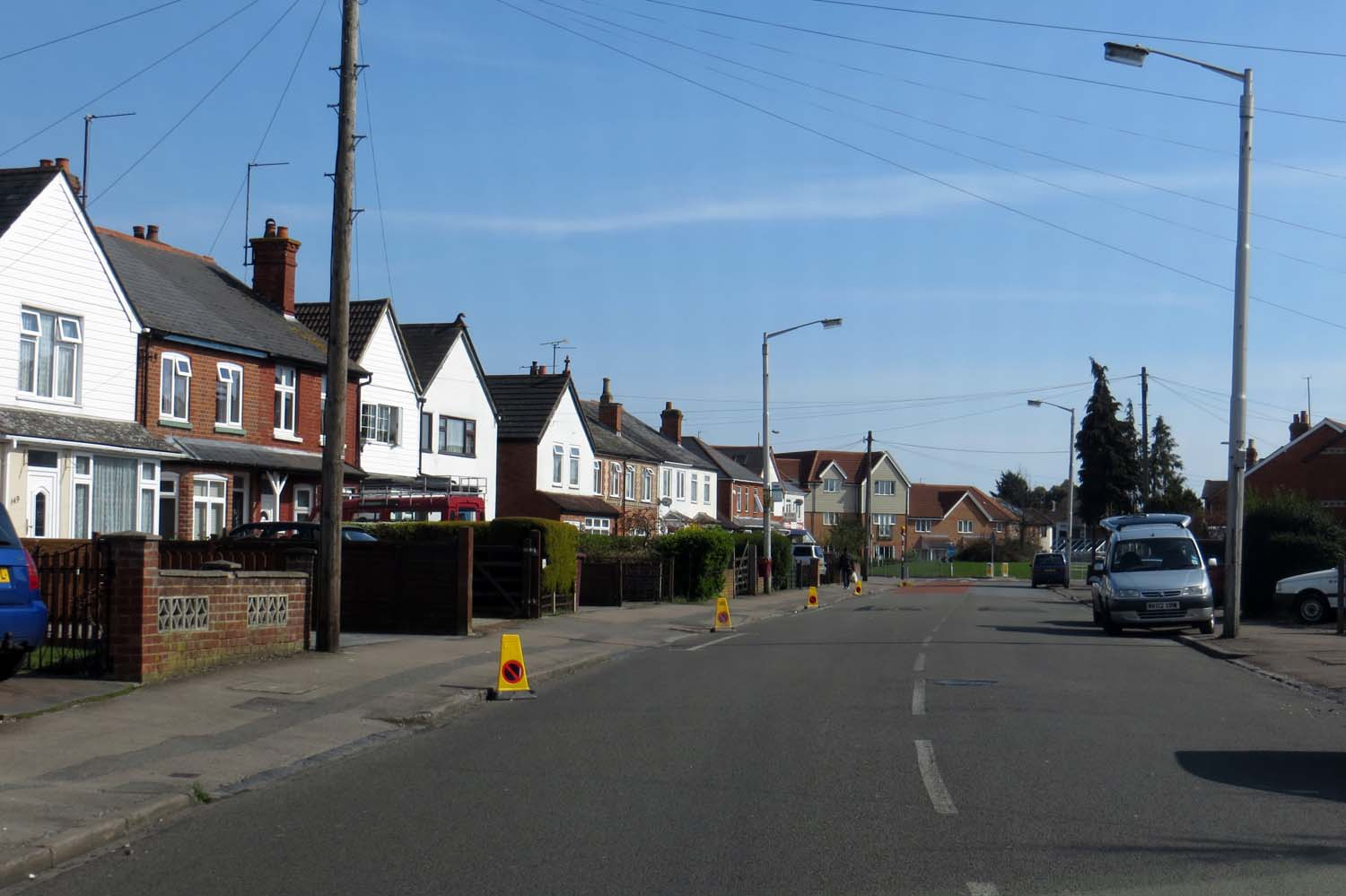
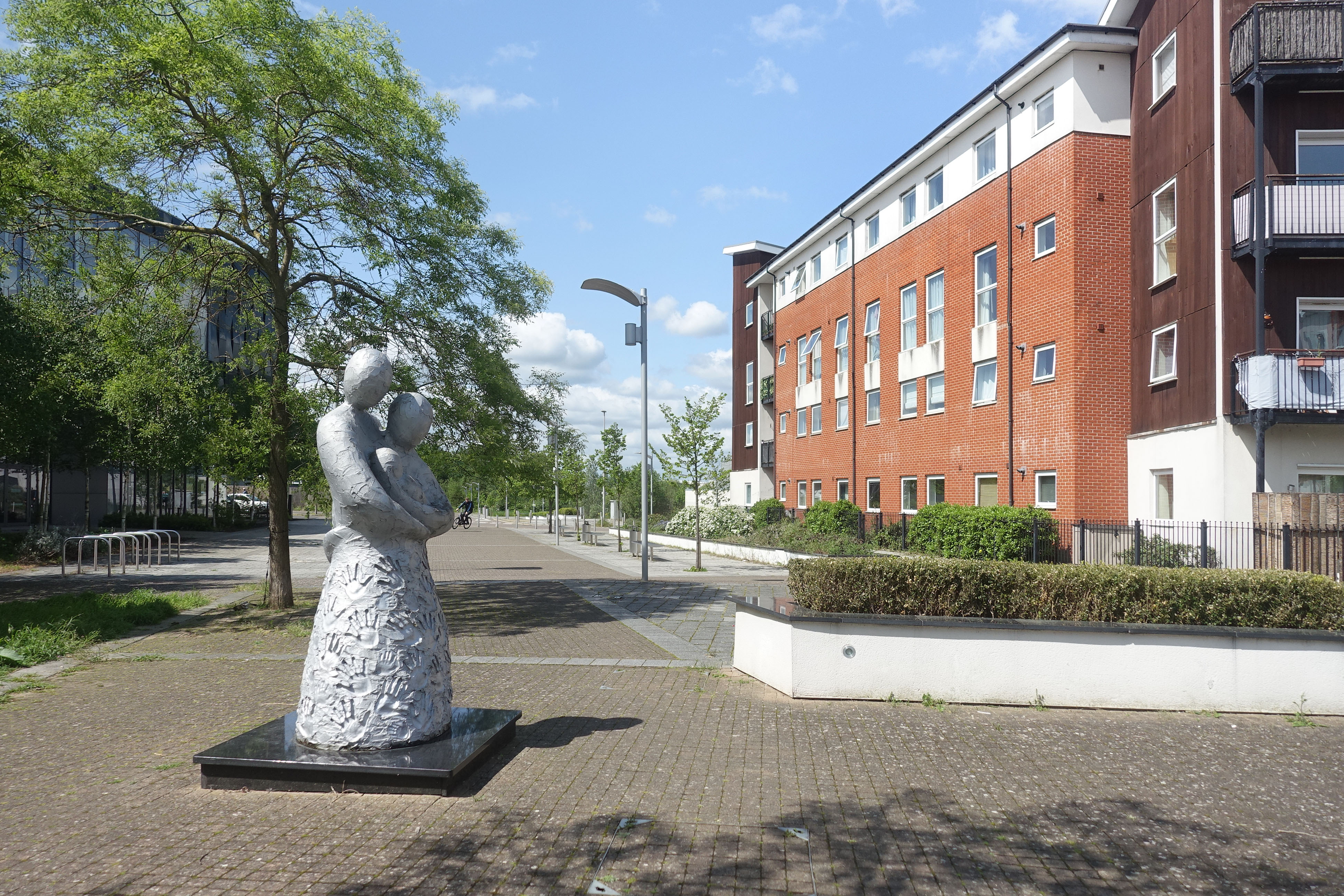
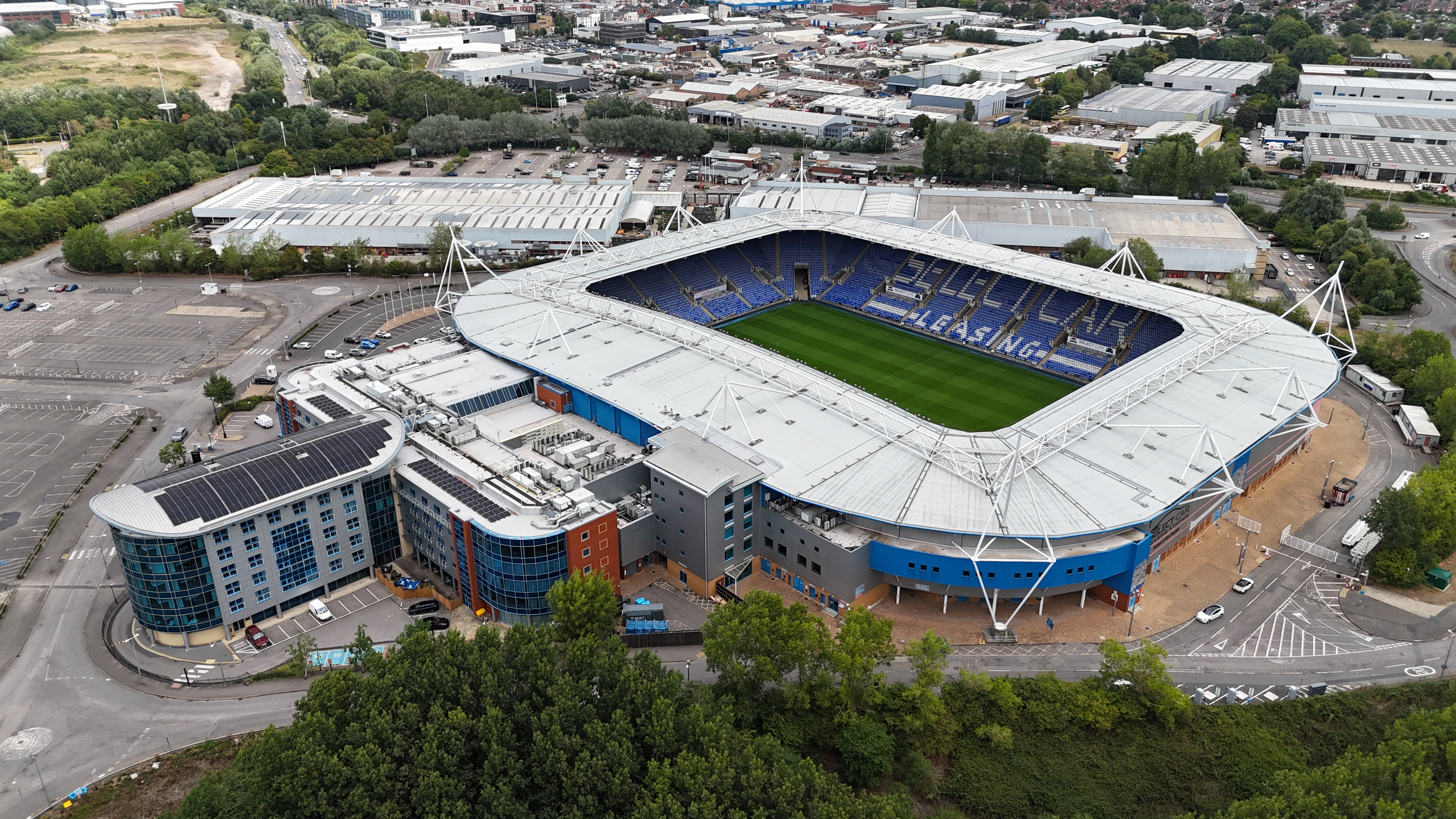
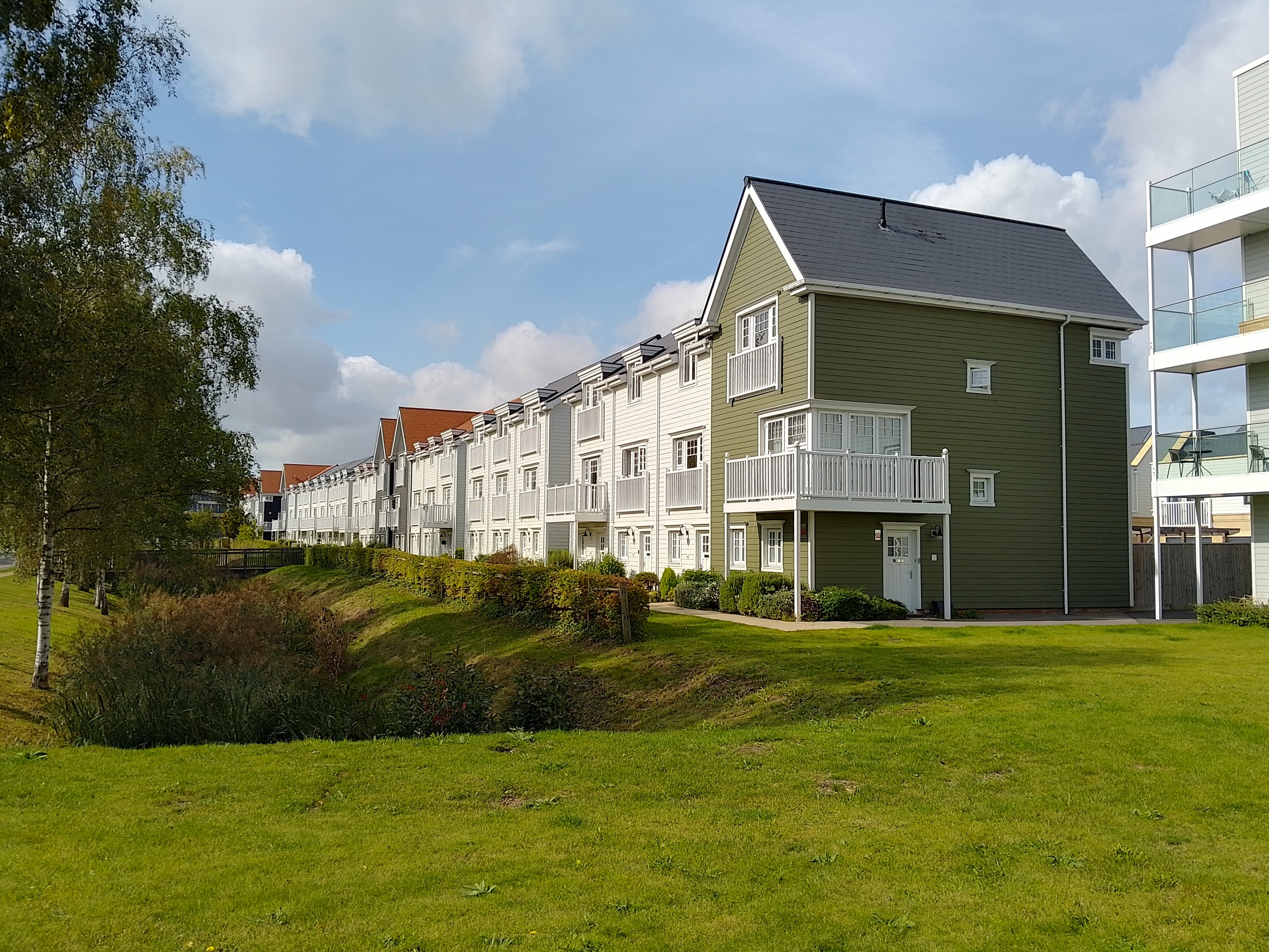
- Clockwise from top left: Whitley Wood Lane in Whitley Wood, Lindisfarne Way in Kennet Island, Longwater Avenue in Green Park and the Madejski Stadium with the Bennet Road industrial area beyond

- Location within Berkshire
- Area: 4.845 km^{2} (1.871 sq mi)
- Population: 12,369
  - Density: 2,553/km^{2} (6,610/sq mi)
- OS grid reference: SU714701
- Unitary authority: Reading
- Ceremonial county: Berkshire
- Region: South East
- Country: England
- Sovereign state: United Kingdom
- Police: Thames Valley
- Fire: Royal Berkshire
- Ambulance: South Central
- UK Parliament: Earley and Woodley

Whitley is an electoral ward of the Borough of Reading, in the English county of Berkshire. It is covers an area south and south-east of the town centre of the town.

== Location ==
In a set of boundary changes in 2022, the boundaries of Whitley ward were significantly changed. One rather strange consequence of this is that the geographical centre of the suburban neighbourhood of Whitley, as depicted on Ordnance Survey maps, now lies in Church ward rather than Whitley ward. Whitley ward instead includes the adjoining suburban neighbourhood of Whitley Wood, together with the new residential areas of Kennet Island and Green Park Village, the Madejski Stadium and the Green Park business park.

From the north in clockwise order the ward is bounded by the backs of the houses on the south side of Hartland Road and by Whitley Wood Road. It then follows the borough boundary between Whitley Wood and Shinfield, south of junction 11 of the M4 motorway and across the south of the Green Park business park as far as Reading Green Park railway station. From here the boundary follows the railway north to the River Kennet, the Kennet to the Rose Kiln Lane Bridge, then Rose Kiln Lane and Basingsoke Road back to Hartland Road.

The ward is bordered by Church, Southcote, Coley and Katesgrove wards of Reading Borough Council, and by the civil parishes of Shinfield, in the Borough of Wokingham, and Burghfield, in West Berkshire. The whole of the ward lies within the Earley and Woodley parliamentary constituency.

== Profile ==
=== Demographics ===
As of 2024, Whitley ward had an area of 4.845 square kilometres (1.871 sq mi) and there were 12,369 people living there. Of these, 19.4% were under 15 and 10.2% were 65 and over; 61.4% classified themselves as White, 20.3% as Asian, and 9.3% as Black, Caribbean or African; 33.1% were born outside the UK.

The population lived in 4,510 households, of which 32.7% were in a flat, maisonette or apartment, and 67.2% were in a house or bungalow. Of the households, 15.6% were owned outright by the residents, 31.4% were owned subject to a mortgage, loan or shared ownership, 25.9% were privately rented and 27.1% were socially rented.

Of the population aged over 16, 65.2% were in employment, 4.3% were unemployed, and 30.5% were economically inactive. Of those in employment, 45.1% were in managerial, professional or technical occupations. A total of 35.6% of the population were educated to university degree level.

=== Environment ===
As of 2022, Whitley ward had a tree canopy cover of 12.1%, compared to figures of 17.7% for the Reading as a whole, and 16.5% for the United Kingdom. The principal open spaces within the ward are the area of Loddon flood-plain to the east of the Basingstoke railway line and north of Green Park Village, the area around the lake in Green Park Business Park, and the Fobney Meadows Wildlife Conservation Area adjacent to Kennet Island.

== Representation ==
As with all wards, Whitley ward elects three councillors to Reading Borough Council. Elections since 2004 are held by thirds, with elections in three years out of four. The ward councillors are currently Rachel Eden, Micky Leng and Alice Mpofu-Coles, all of whom are members of the Labour party.
