= Green Park Village =

Housing development in Reading, England

Coordinates: 51°25′33″N 0°59′44″W

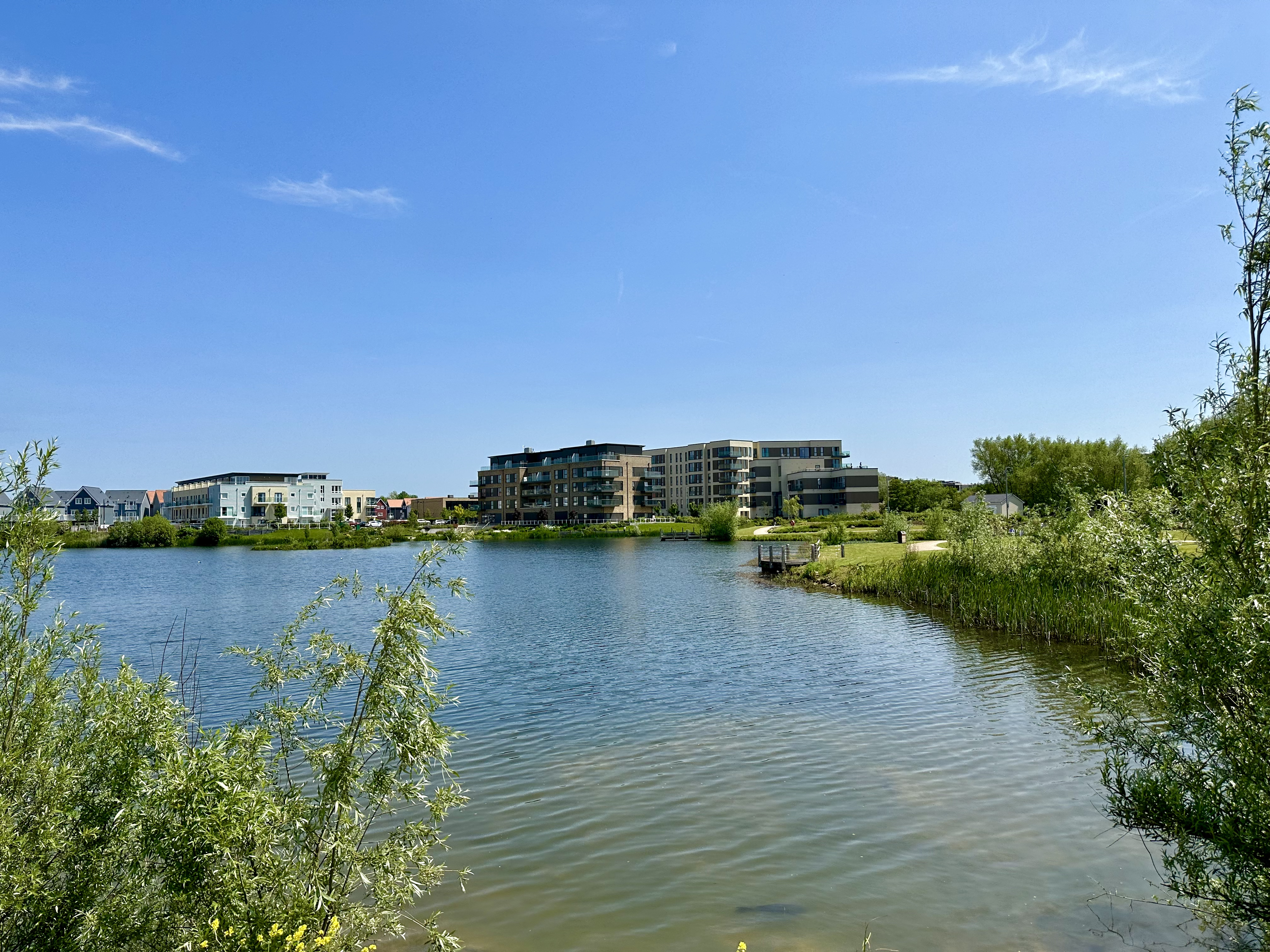
- Part of Green Park Village seen across South Lake from near Reading Green Park station

- Location within Berkshire
- OS grid reference: SU698701
- Unitary authority: Reading
- Ceremonial county: Berkshire
- Region: South East
- Country: England
- Sovereign state: United Kingdom
- Police: Thames Valley
- Fire: Royal Berkshire
- Ambulance: South Central
- UK Parliament: Earley and Woodley

Green Park Village is a housing development that constitutes the residential component of the Green Park development in Reading, Berkshire, adjacent to Green Park business park and a new railway station, Reading Green Park. It consists of more than 1,300 new homes, including both apartments and "New-England" style houses, forming a new suburb of Reading. The housing surrounds South Lake, with a noticeably higher density on the west (railway station) side as compared to the earlier eastern side.

Facilities in the village include a school – Green Park Village Primary Academy, a lakeside café, a coffee shop, a residents' club and a Tesco Express supermarket adjacent to the station.

Green Park Village lies entirely within the borough of Reading, in Whitley ward. It is a part of Earley and Woodley parliamentary constituency.

== History ==
The plan for the development put forward in 2010 included 737 homes, a railway station to serve the village and surrounding areas, and a primary school. Subsequent plans have almost doubled the number of homes to be built.

The development was opened to potential purchasers from April 2016, the primary school opened in September 2020, and the railway station in May 2023. The development was fully sold and completed in 2025.

== Gallery ==
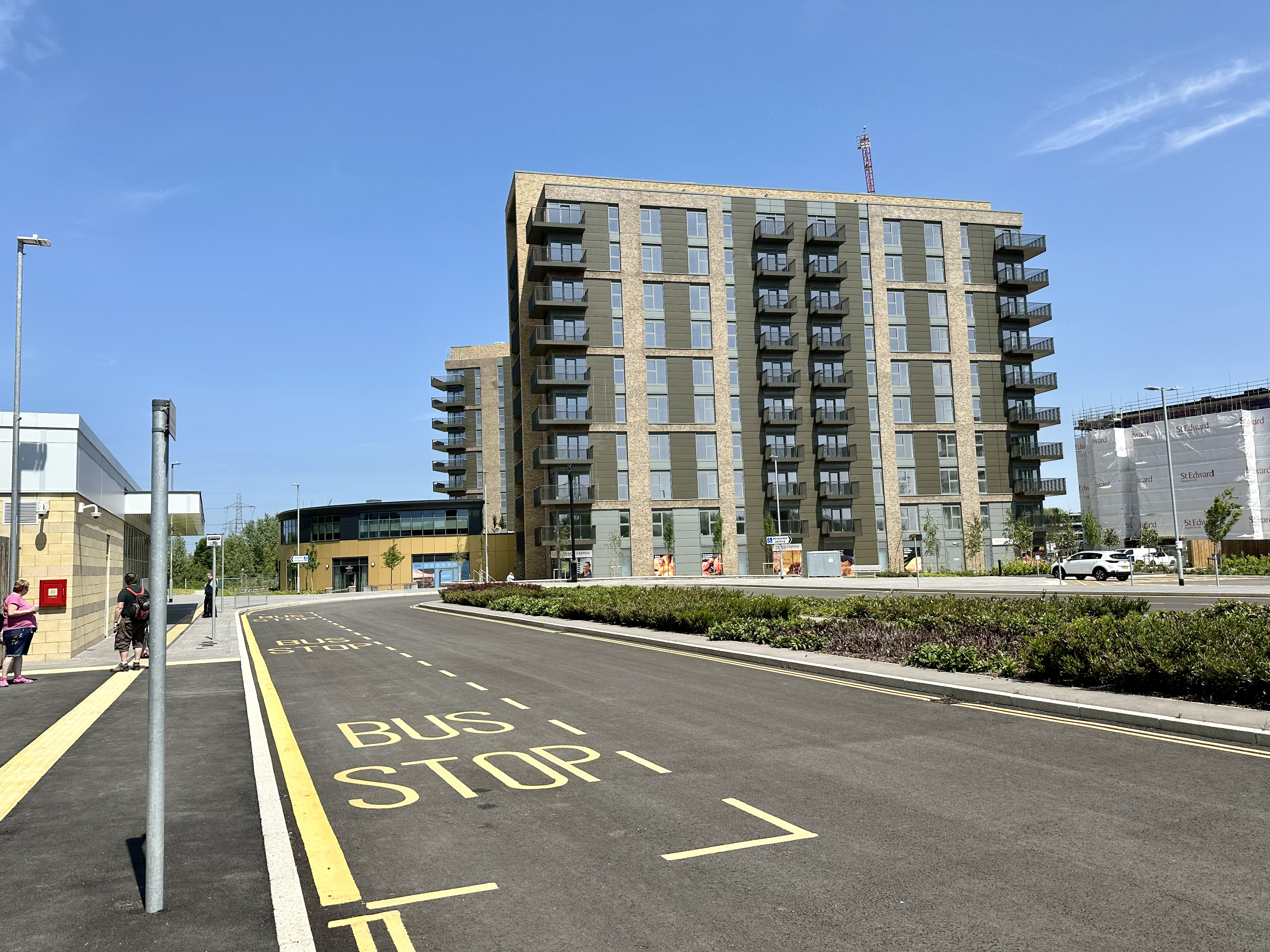
Apartment blocks by the railway station

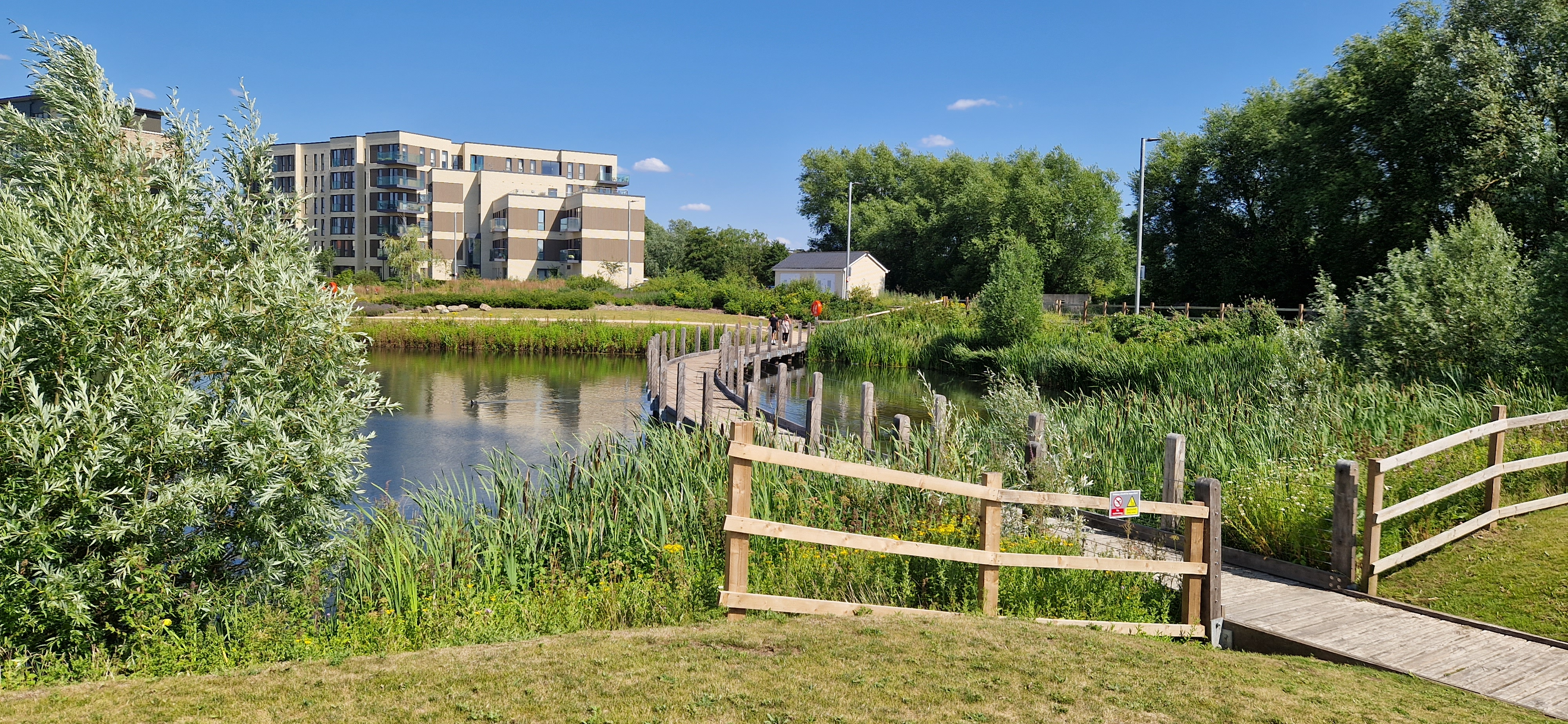
Boardwalk from station towards part of the village east of South Lake

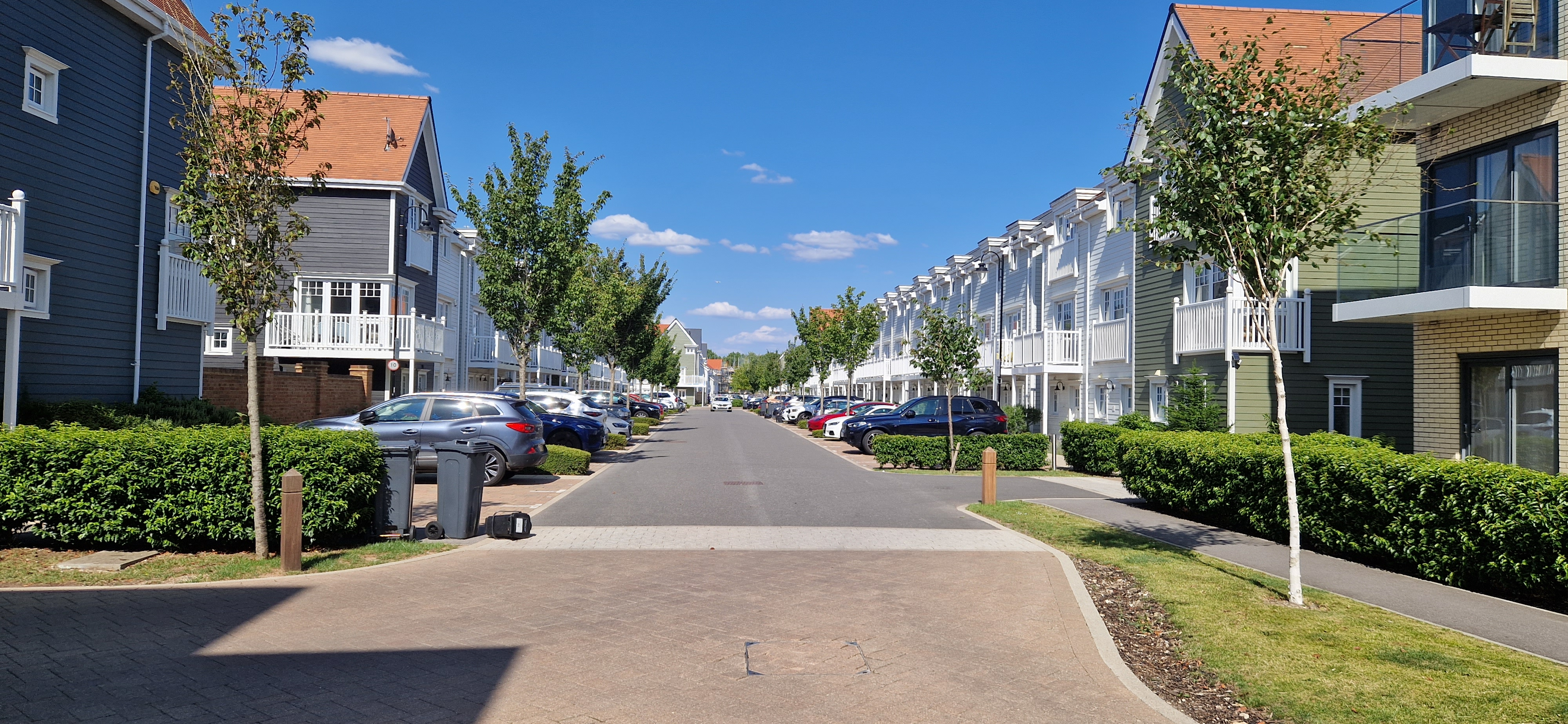
Champlain Street in the village to the east of South Lake
