= Whitley Wood =

Suburb of Reading in Berkshire, England

Coordinates: 51°24′59″N 0°57′42″W

- Suburb
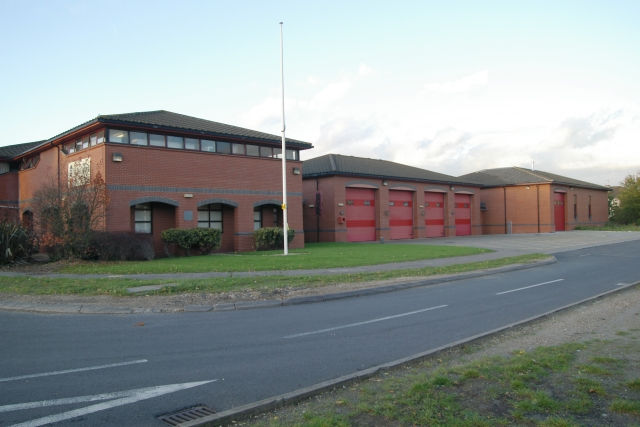
- Whitley Wood fire station

- Location within Berkshire
- OS grid reference: SU723691
- Unitary authority: Reading
- Ceremonial county: Berkshire
- Region: South East
- Country: England
- Sovereign state: United Kingdom
- Post town: Reading
- Postcode district: RG2
- Dialling code: 0118
- Police: Thames Valley
- Fire: Royal Berkshire
- Ambulance: South Central
- UK Parliament: Earley and Woodley

Whitley Wood is a suburb to the south of Reading in the English county of Berkshire.

== Geography ==
Whitley Wood is bounded to the north by an ill-defined boundary with the suburb of Whitley, to the east by a ridge of high ground carrying the road to Shinfield, to the west by the valleys of the River Kennet and the Foudry Brook, and to the south by the M4 motorway.

== Government ==
Whitley Wood lies within the Borough of Reading and all local government responsibility lies with the borough council. Whitley Wood is within Whitley ward.

Whitley Wood is a part of Earley and Woodley parliamentary constituency.
