= Oakridge, Hampshire =

Village in Hampshire, England

Coordinates: 51.27°N 01.09°W

Oakridge
- Location within Hampshire
- OS grid reference: SU6353
- District: Basingstoke and Deane
- Shire county: Hampshire
- Region: South East
- Country: England
- Sovereign state: United Kingdom
- Post town: BASINGSTOKE
- Postcode district: RG21
- Dialling code: 01256
- Police: Hampshire and Isle of Wight
- Fire: Hampshire and Isle of Wight
- Ambulance: South Central

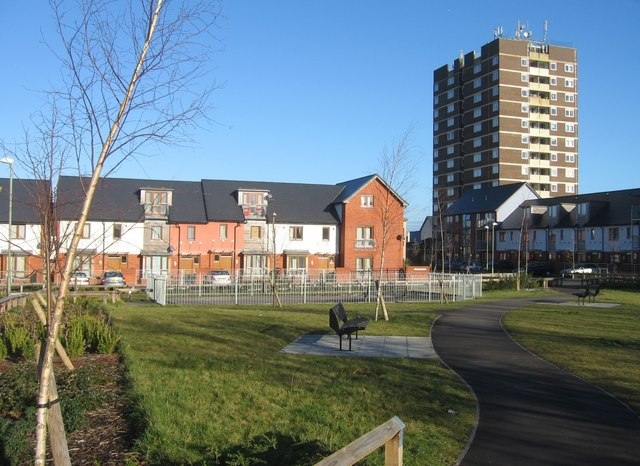
Old & new Oakridge Tower

Oakridge was a village in Hampshire, England, immediately north of Basingstoke.

== History ==
The area was built with mansionettes as part of the rapid expansion of Basingstoke. The new estate did not age well. The area became increasingly run-down and proved hard to let. In 1997, a group called the Oakridge Central Regeneration group was set up to have the estate redeveloped. HTA Architects was appointed and planning permission was granted in 2000. The redevelopment was built in phases: Phase 1 comprised mostly terraced housing, and Phase 2 most three-story apartments (Phase 3 was built by another contractor entirely). 149 homes were replaced with 299, increasing both the population density of the area and its urban green space. Oakridge is now listed as a suburb of Basingstoke rather than a separate village.
