= Mapletree Investments =

Singaporean real estate company

- Type: Privately owned company
- Industry: Property, Investment
- Founded: 18 December 2000; 25 years ago
- Headquarters: Singapore
- Key people: Edmund Cheng (Chairperson); Hiew Yoon Khong (Group CEO)
- Revenue: S$2.86 billion
- AUM: S$77.4 billion (as at 31 March 2023)
- Total assets: ▲ S$57.0 billion (2023)
- Total equity: ▲ S$31.3 billion (2023)
- Number of employees: 2400+
- Parent: Temasek
- Website: Mapletree.com.sg

Mapletree Investments Pte Ltd is a global real estate development, investment, capital and property management company. Headquartered in Singapore, the Group currently manages three Singapore-listed real estate investment trusts (REITs) and nine private equity real estate funds, which hold a diverse portfolio of assets in Asia Pacific, Europe, the United Kingdom (UK) and the United States (US).

== Introduction ==
On 7 December 2000, PSA Corporation formed The HarbourFront Ltd to transfer its non-port properties to Temasek Holdings. Mapletree Investments Pte Ltd was later formed on 18 December 2000 and is a wholly owned subsidiary of Temasek.

Mapletree owns and manages S$77.4 billion of logistics, office, retail, mixed-used, industrial, data centre, student accommodation and residential properties as at 31 March 2023/2024.

The Group's properties, are located across 13 markets globally and has offices in Singapore, Australia, Canada, China, Europe, Hong Kong SAR, India, Japan, Malaysia, South Korea, the United Kingdom, the United States and Vietnam. Mapletree's property portfolio includes projects in Singapore such as VivoCity, Mapletree Business City, and Saigon South Place in Ho Chi Minh City, Vietnam.
