= A33 road =

Major road in England

A33

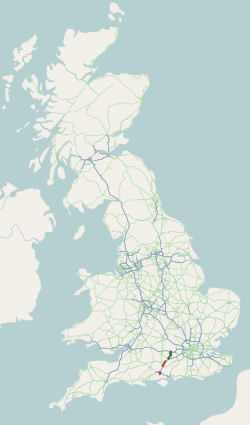

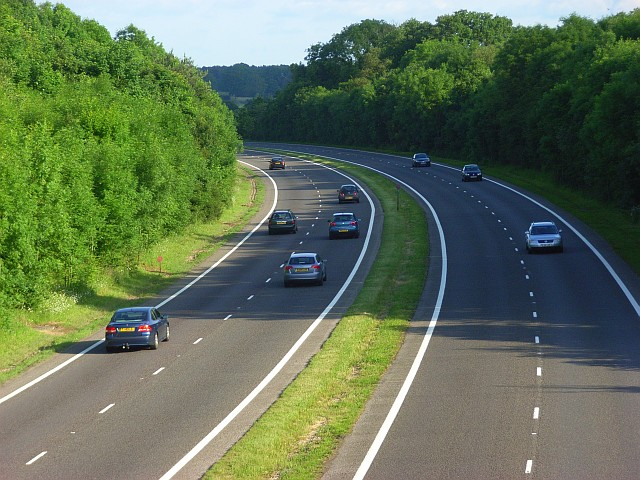
- The A33 near Spencers Wood just south of Reading

Section 1
- Length: 16.4 mi (26.4 km)
- North end: A329 in Reading
- Major intersections: A4 in Reading; M4 in Reading
- South end: A339 in Basingstoke

Section 2
- Length: 9.8 mi (15.8 km)
- North end: A30 near North Waltham
- Southern end: A34 near Winchester

Section 3
- Length: 7.7 mi (12.4 km)
- North end: A27 near Chilworth
- South end: M271 / A35 in Southampton

Location
- Country: United Kingdom
- Counties: Berkshire; Hampshire
- Primary destinations: Basingstoke; Winchester

Road network
- Roads in the United Kingdom; Motorways; A and B road zones

The A33 is a major road in the counties of Berkshire and Hampshire in southern England. The road currently runs in three disjointed sections.

== Route ==
=== Reading–Basingstoke ===
The first stretch of the A33 is a relatively new road, built as the A33 relief road, which starts on the Inner Distribution Road and bypasses most of suburban Reading, servicing the Kennet Island residential development, Madejski Stadium and Green Park Business Park, towards the M4, where it connects at junction 11. The first stretch of this road follows the route of the old Coley branch railway, including a passage under the railway era bridge carrying Berkeley Avenue. A two-year redevelopment scheme ran from early 2008 until late 2010, widening the northern section of the dual carriageway and significantly expanding and improving the motorway junction. The Mereoak Roundabout south of the motorway was replaced with two separate junctions with traffic lights.

The section south of the M4 is dual carriageway up to the county boundary with Hampshire, where it reverts to single carriageway towards Basingstoke.

=== Basingstoke–Winchester ===
The second section of the A33 starts near Popham, southwest of Basingstoke at a junction with the A30. The road from here to Winchester is a scenic mix of single and dual carriageway, that was progressively improved in the late 1960s. The route runs through much of the borough of Basingstoke and Deane. At Kings Worthy, the road diverts onto part of the original Winchester Bypass, constructed in the late 1930s, up to the A34.

=== Southampton ===
The third section of A33 starts at the Chilworth Roundabout, a junction with the A27 and M3, and runs south into the centre of Southampton and further south to Ocean Village. It then turns west and into dual carriageway at a roundabout near the Isle of Wight ferry terminal, past the docks and through Town Quay to run along West Quay Road, continuing past Leisure World and Ikea (which is partially responsible for congestion on the road and immediate surroundings due to its popularity, particularly on weekends). The A33 then bears left slightly to carry on along the Millbrook Road West dual carriageway to meet the M271 and A35 at Redbridge Flyover.

== History ==
The A33 originally started at a junction with what was the A32 at Riseley Common and was a continuous route to Southampton. Between Basingstoke and Southampton, it mostly followed the course of the historic Roman Road between these towns. This section of the route became part of the London–Southampton Trunk Road. The road was progressively detrunked as the M3 was extended.

The Winchester Bypass was constructed in the mid-1930s. While a significant improvement at the time, as other parts of the road were improved around it, it became increasingly ineffective and dangerous. The bypass was subsequently replaced by the completion of the M3 over Twyford Down, which generated a significant road protest.

== Junction list ==
=== Reading-Basingstoke ===
County	Location	mi	km	Destinations	Notes
Berkshire	Reading	0.0	0.0	A329 to M4 east / A329(M) / A4155 – Caversham, Henley, Maidenhead	Northern terminus
Berkshire	Reading	0.4	0.64	Rose Kiln Lane to A4 / M4 east / A34 – Newbury, Oxford	
Berkshire	Reading	2.8	4.5	M4 – London, South Wales	M4 junction 11
Hampshire	Basingstoke	15.1	24.3	A339 (Ring Road) / Faraday Road / Norn Hill / Oakridge Road to M3 / A340 – Town centre, Alton, Newbury, Aldermaston, Old Basing, Oakridge	Southern terminus
1.000 mi = 1.609 km; 1.000 km = 0.621 mi

=== Basingstoke-Winchester ===
County	Location	mi	km	Destinations	Notes
Hampshire	North Waltham–Dummer boundary	0.0	0.0	A30 (Stockbridge Road) to M3 / A303 – Salisbury, Andover, London, Basingstoke	Northern terminus
Hampshire	Headbourne Worthy	9.8	15.8	A34 south	Southern terminus; access only from A33 to A34 south and from A34 north to A33
1.000 mi = 1.609 km; 1.000 km = 0.621 mi: Incomplete access

=== Southampton ===
County	Location	mi	km	Destinations	Notes
Hampshire	Southampton–Chilworth boundary	0.0	0.0	M3 north-east / A27 (Basset Green Road / Chilworth Road) to A335 – London, Eastleigh, Winchester, Romsey, Chilworth, North Baddesley, Swaythling, Southampton Airport	Northern terminus
Hampshire	Southampton	0.8– 1.1	1.3– 1.8	A35 (Burgess Road / Winchester Road)	
Hampshire	Southampton	1.2	1.9	Highfield Avenue (A3035 south-east) – Portswood, Bitterne	Destinations signed southbound only; north-western terminus of A3035
Hampshire	Southampton	2.8	4.5	A335 north – Eastleigh, Portwood	Access only from A33 north to A335 north and from A335 south to A33 south; southern terminus of A335
Hampshire	Southampton	2.9	4.7	Ring Road west (A3024 west)	Northern terminus of A3024 concurrency
Hampshire	Southampton	3.2	5.1	A3024 east / New Road to M27 – Fareham, Portsmouth	Southern terminus of A3024 concurrency
Hampshire	Southampton	3.8	6.1	Itchen Bridge (A3025 east) – Woolston	Toll bridge; western terminus of A3025
Hampshire	Southampton	5.2– 5.4	8.4– 8.7	City centre (A3024 east / A3057 north-west)	Western terminus of A3024; south-eastern terminus of A3057
Hampshire	Southampton			Shirley, Portswood	Grade-separated junction; northbound exit and southbound entrance
Hampshire	Southampton	6.9– 7.4	11.1– 11.9	Dock Gate 20 (A35 east)	Grade-separated junction; northern terminus of A35 concurrency
Hampshire	Southampton	7.7	12.4	M271 north / A35 west to M27 / A326 – The West, Lyndhurst, Totton, London, Winchester, Fawley	Southern terminus of A35 concurrency; southern terminus of M271; Southern terminus
1.000 mi = 1.609 km; 1.000 km = 0.621 mi: Concurrency terminus; Incomplete access; Tolled
