= Green Park business park =

Business park in Reading, England

Green Park Business Park
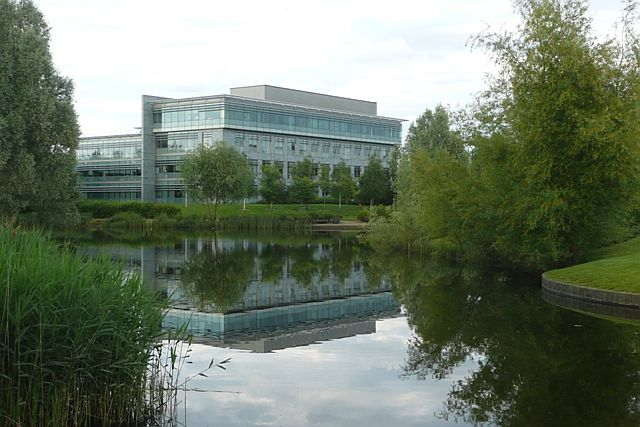

- Location within Reading
- Location: Reading, Berkshire, UK
- Coordinates: 51.424354°N 0.991361°W
- Owner: Mapletree Investments
- No. of workers: 7,000
- Size: 195 acres (79 ha)
- Website: greenpark.co.uk

Green Park is a British business park near junction 11 of the M4 motorway on the outskirts of the English town of Reading. The park opened in 1999, and is currently owned by Mapletree. It covers 195 acres (79 ha) and comprises 19 office buildings arranged around the Longwater, a central lake and wildlife habitat. The buildings provide 1,500,000 square feet (140,000 m^{2}) of office space, and in excess of 6,500 people work on site.

The site is part of Reading's Green Park suburb, along with the residential Green Park Village and Reading Green Park railway station. It is bounded by the M4 motorway to the south, the Madejski Stadium and the A33 road to the east, Green Park Village to the north, and the Reading to Basingstoke railway line to the west. From a local government perspective it is largely located within the Borough of Reading, but partly in the civil parish of Shinfield within the Borough of Wokingham.

== History ==
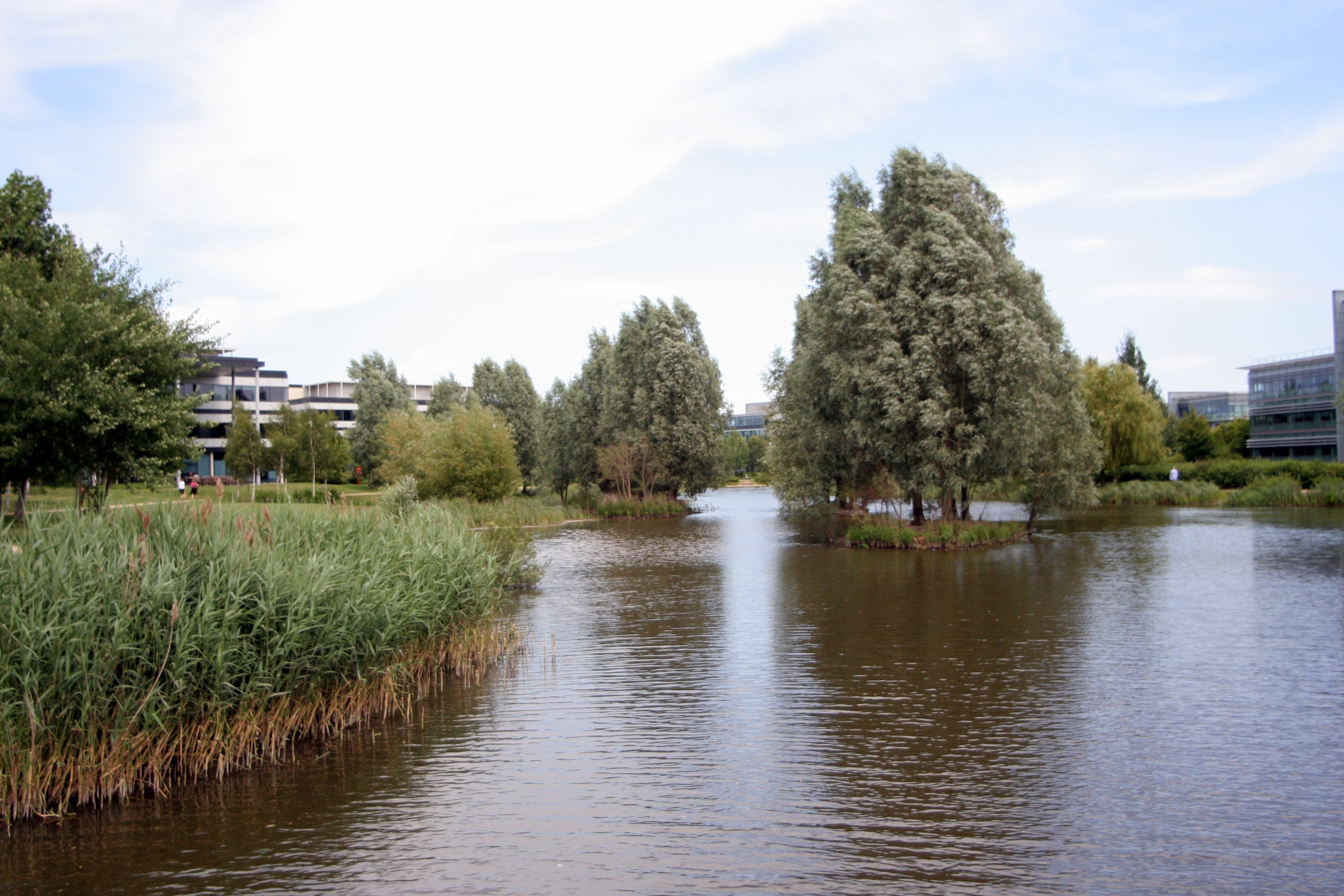
The central lake makes a virtue of the necessity of flood alleviation measures

Green Park business park was developed by Prudential and PRUPIM on what was once an area of low lying and poor quality agricultural land. The fact that the land was prone to flooding necessitated the construction of flood alleviation features, including the central Longwater lake and the realigned Foudry Brook.

The park was opened in February 1999. Initially Cisco Systems committed to taking 607,000 square feet (56,400 m^{2}) of office space, with options on a further 617,000 square feet (57,300 m^{2}). However the bursting of the dot-com bubble in 2001 led to a severe scaling back of Cisco's requirements, and resulted in five of their buildings remaining empty for many years.

The park was purchased by Oxford Properties in November 2011, and in the following year they came to an agreement with Cisco whereby the latter company paid a premium in order to surrender its leases on 517,000 square feet (48,000 m^{2}) of space, retaining only a much smaller amount of space.

In 2014, the park was awarded a Civic Trust Award in the public realm class for its landscape design, architecture and community involvement.

Green Park was sold to Mapletree in May 2016 for £560m.

== Transport ==
Green Park business park is accessed from two junctions off the A33 road, respectively 0.7 miles (1.1 km) and 0.9 miles (1.4 km) north of junction 11 of the M4 motorway, and 2.4 miles (3.9 km) and 2.6 miles (4.2 km) south of Reading town centre. Bus route Greenwave 50, operated by Reading Buses, connects Green Park to Reading town centre and Reading railway station. Bus route 600, also operated by Reading Buses, is a short walk from Green Park and serves a park and ride site at Mereoak south of the M4. Between Reading and Green Park frequencies vary from 4 buses per hour during weekday peak periods to every 45 minutes on Saturdays.

Reading Green Park railway station opened on 27 May 2023 and Great Western Railway operates half-hourly services to Reading and Basingstoke on weekdays and Saturdays with hourly trains on Sundays.

Route 23 of the National Cycle Network follows a traffic-free routing through the centre of Green Park, on its way from Reading to Basingstoke.

== Green Park wind turbine [Eco City Reading] ==
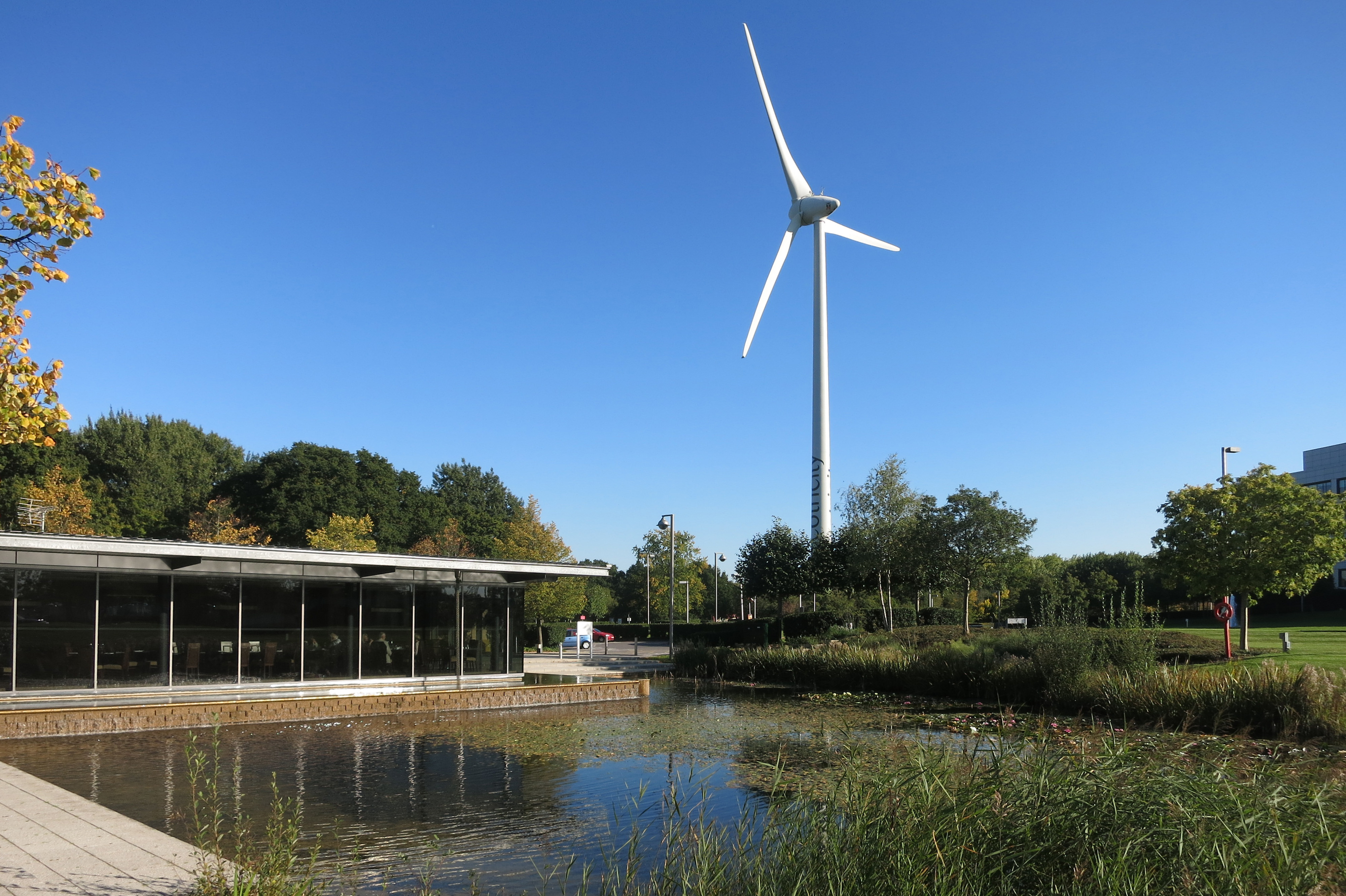
Green Park wind turbine viewed from Lime Square

The most visible feature of Green Park business park is an Enercon E-70 wind turbine, adjacent to the M4 motorway, and billed as the UK's most visible turbine. The blades are 33 m (108 ft) long, with a tower height of 85 m (279 ft). At a wind speed of 14 m/s (31 mph) the machine generates 2.05 MW of electricity (less for lower wind speeds), which is enough to power around 1,500 homes. It is owned and operated by Ecotricity and was completed in November 2005. It is one of Berkshires tallest structures.

== Facilities ==
Most of the facilities for Green Park business park are located on Lime Square, alongside the southern access road to the park and opposite the wind turbine. This offers a day nursery, Childbase, for pre-school children, as well as a play area for children up to 10 years, The Mad House Play & Party World. There is also a Nuffield Health Fitness & Wellbeing Centre, a waterside brasserie called Zest at Lime Square, an Asda Click & Collect, and a WH Smith store.

At the opposite end of the park, 100 Longwater Avenue contains the Byte Café and is home to the Green Park Conference Centre, which hosts meeting rooms and amenities for various sized meetings and conferences.

== Sport ==
The business park is adjacent to the Madejski Stadium, home of Reading Football Club and the London Irish rugby club. The UK's third largest annual running event, the Reading Half Marathon starts from within the business park, which provides the space needed for pre-race marshalling of the large numbers of competitors, and finishes in the stadium. The business park is also home to the annual Green Park Triathlon which encourages participants to 'Commit to get Fit' and raise money for Comic Relief.
