= Reading Green Park railway station =

Railway station in Berkshire, England

Reading Green Park
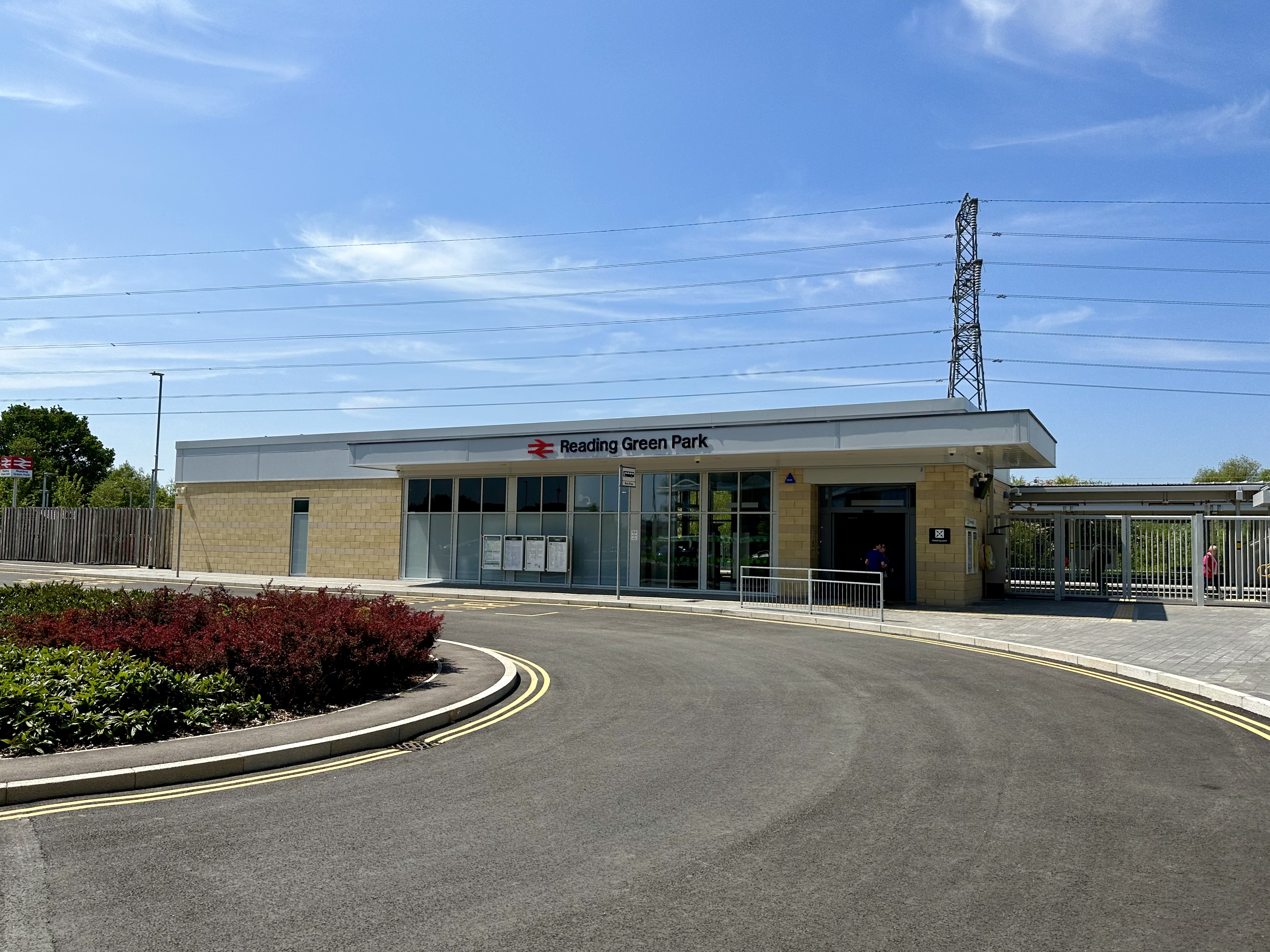
- The station entrance on the opening day in May 2023

General information
- Location: Reading, Berkshire; England
- Coordinates: 51°25′36″N 1°0′5″W
- Grid reference: SU695702
- Owner: Network Rail
- Manager: Great Western Railway
- Platforms: 2

Other information
- Station code: RGP

Key dates
- Spring 2019: Construction began
- 27 May 2023: Opened

Passengers
- 2023/24: 0.141 million
- 2024/25: ▲0.221 million
Location
- Location within Reading, Berkshire

Reading Green Park railway station is a railway station in Green Park, Berkshire, England. The station serves the Green Park business area and the Madejski Stadium, as well as the Green Park Village residential development. It is on the Reading to Basingstoke Line, south of Southcote Junction. The station opened later than planned on 27 May 2023, due to construction delays caused by the COVID-19 pandemic.

Green Park Village, the Madejski Stadium and most of the Green Park business area all within the borough of Reading, as is the station car park, bus and taxi interchange, and only access road. However the station building and platforms are within the civil parish of Burghfield in the West Berkshire unitary authority. There is no access to the station from the Burghfield side of the line.

== History ==
=== Initial proposals ===
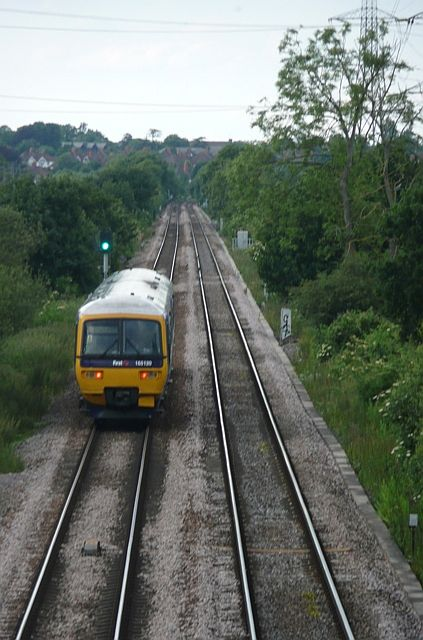
Station site in 2008

Plans were announced in July 2007 and approved by the Office of Rail Regulation in March 2009. Building was originally expected to begin in early 2009, and be completed in early 2010. However, by late November 2010 building had not begun. Submissions were made to extend the planning permission for the station, which were due to expire in late 2010 and early 2011.

It was reported that the extended applications for planning consent contain a clause which, if approved, would ensure the developer of Green Park Village pays a premium of £4.26 million to find an alternative developer for the station if work has not begun on it within two years.

In October 2011, the owners of the business park, Prupim, announced that plans for the station had been suspended after a local housing development project had been scaled down.

=== Resubmitted proposals ===
In December 2013, Reading Borough Council stated that it would re-submit planning proposals for the station in 2014. It was reported in July 2014, that a £17 million Government investment in road and rail projects in Berkshire will include a sum for the station, enabling building work to start in 2015–16. In November 2014, the total investment was cited as £21.4 million, and that the station would cost £6. million. In March 2015, this cost was revised to £8 million in planning submissions to Reading Borough Council. The first £6.4 million would be met by the local enterprise partnership and the remaining £1.6 million covered by Reading Borough Council. In April 2015 the council's planning committee renewed planning permission for the station. The station's funding was announced by the Government in 2017.

The station was planned to open in 2018, which should have coincided with electrification of the Reading – Basingstoke Line and introduction of new or refurbished trains. However, the electrification of the line was then put back until after 2019, and by December 2022 has not been commenced. The proposed service was discussed at a meeting of Reading Borough Council's strategic environment, planning and transport committee in November 2015. Concern was expressed that delay to the electrification of the railway line between Southcote Junction and Basingstoke could adversely affect the proposed train service.

The station was planned to be built in four phases, with its facilities expanding as the business park and residential development are built. Each phase was built only when there is the required funding or demand:

- Phase one provided a station with two platforms, each long enough for a five-coach train, platform canopies and a footbridge. There would be an access road and shared cycle and footway to the station. The station would have two bus bays, a cycle hire hub and cycle parking with an unspecified number of spaces.
- Phase two would add a separate footpath to segregate pedestrians from cyclists, as well as a rank for five taxis, and increase the number of bus bays from two to three.
- Phase three would add another section of access road, increase the number of bus bays to six and add a ground-level car park with 103 spaces. If enough funds were forthcoming soon enough, the project could proceed straight from Phase One to Phase Three.
- Phase four would add a 200-space four-storey car park and reduce the ground level car park to 42 spaces.

In July 2016, the Berkshire Local Transport Body (BLTB) awarded an additional £3 million to the initial £6.4 million contract for Green Park Station after a review concluded "a significant increase in the forecast passenger demand for the station in comparison to the calculations undertaken in 2013". The additional funding would be for additional shelters and improved ticketing facilities. The Department for Transport confirmed in July 2017 that Reading Green Park station would receive £2.3 million from the New Stations Fund towards a total project cost of £16.5 million.

=== Construction ===
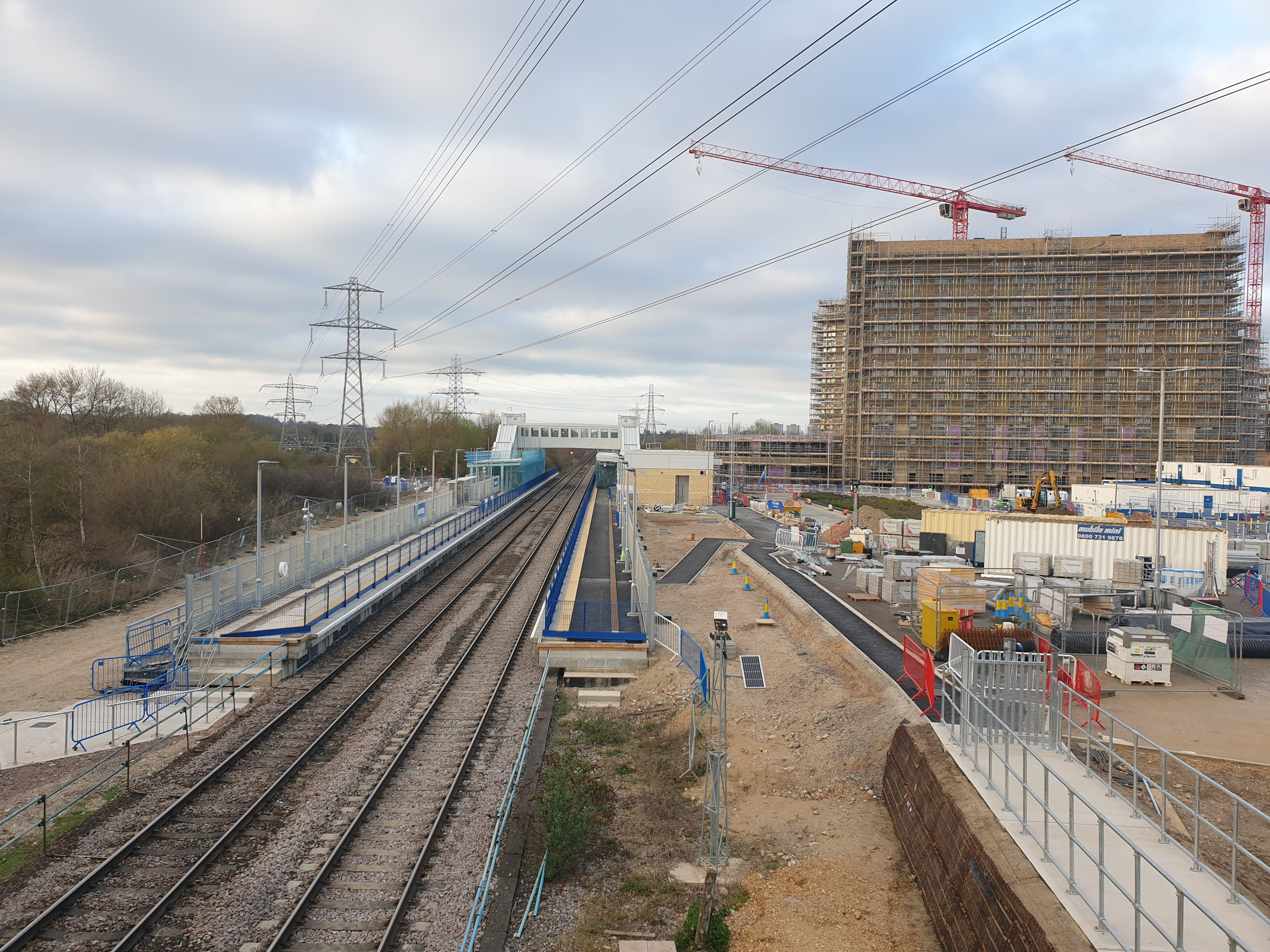
Station being constructed in March 2022, looking north from Kirtons Farm Road bridge.

Construction started on the station in the spring of 2019. The station was originally due for opening in May 2020, then brought forward to Summer 2019, then set to open by the end of 2020, before being delayed by the COVID-19 pandemic. In October 2020, it was reported to be due to open in the late summer of 2021 "at the earliest". In June 2021, Network Rail announced that the opening had been put back until April to June 2022.

By 8 August 2021, work on the station buildings and platforms were largely complete, and the new station bridge had been lifted into place. Following the completion of the building works, a four- to six-month commissioning period was expected to follow, in order for the station to receive authorisation to be entered into service. The total cost was stated to be £20.077 million.

The station opened on 27 May 2023.

== Facilities ==
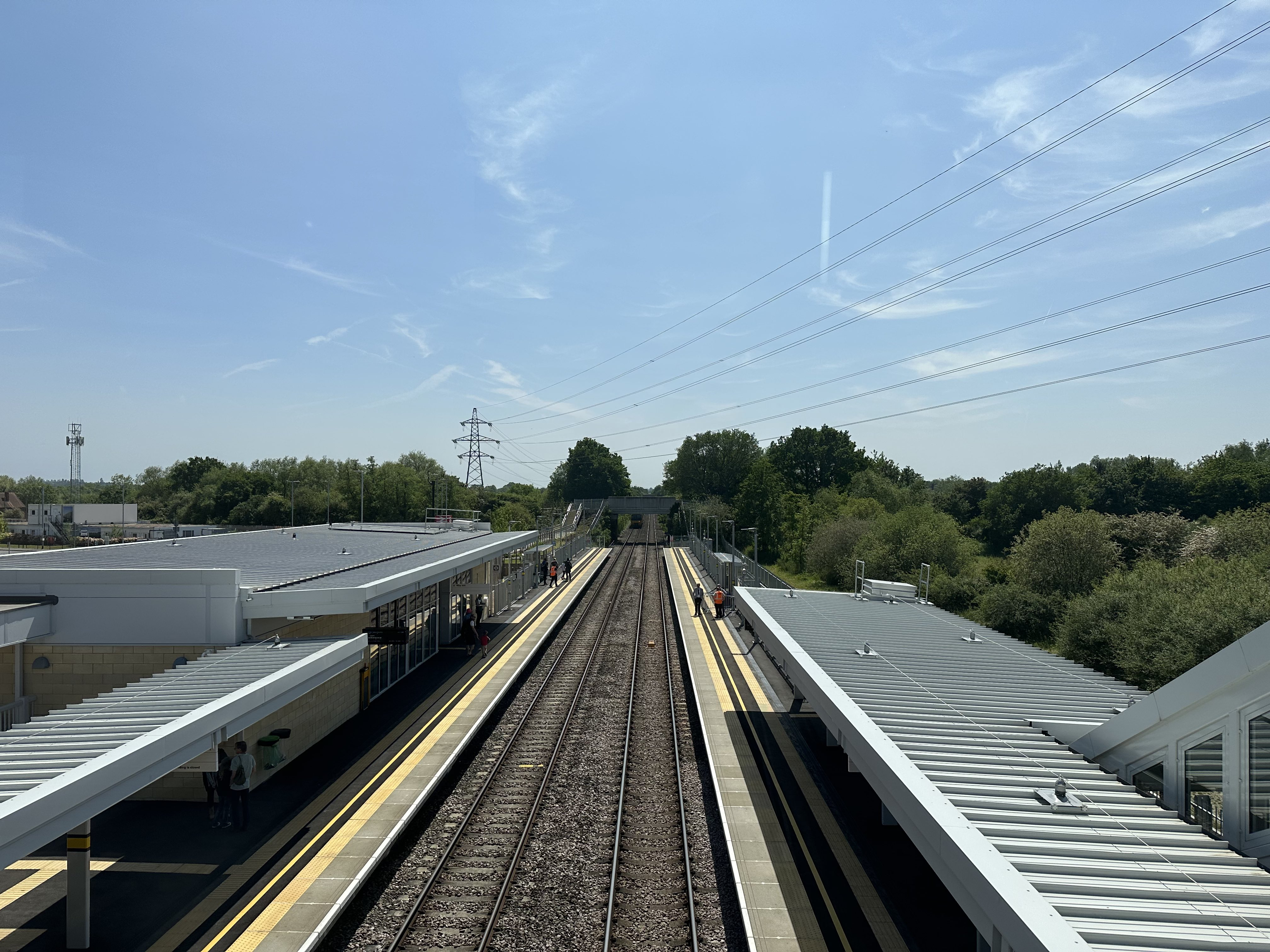
Station platforms pictured from footbridge

The station has two 150-metre-long (490 ft) canopied platforms which can accommodate up to six-car trains, which are connected by a 15-metre-long (49 ft) bridge, with lifts and stairs. The station has an interchange with the existing Green Park Park and Ride bus system, together with a taxi rank, surface level car park and cycle parking.

== Services ==
All services at Reading Green Park are operated by Great Western Railway using Class 165 and 166 DMUs.

The typical off-peak service is two trains per hour in each direction between Reading and Basingstoke. On Sundays, the service is reduced to hourly in each direction.

| Preceding station | National Rail | Following station |
|---|---|---|
| Reading West | Great Western Railway Reading to Basingstoke Line | Mortimer |

== Sources ==
- Director of Environment and Neighbourhood Services (29 April 2015). "Committee Report" (PDF). Reading Borough Council. Archived from the original (PDF) on 3 March 2016.
