= Earley and Woodley =

UK Parliament constituency (since 2024)

Coordinates: 51.42°N 0.92°W

- Borough constituency for the House of Commons
- Interactive map of boundaries from 2024
- Boundary of Earley and Woodley in South East England
- County: Berkshire
- Electorate: 70,083 (2023)
- Major settlements: Earley, Woodley, Shinfield

Current constituency
- Created: 2024
- Member of Parliament: Yuan Yang (Labour)
- Seats: One
- Created from: Reading West, Reading East, Maidenhead, and Wokingham

Earley and Woodley is a constituency of the House of Commons in the UK Parliament. Following the completion of the 2023 review of Westminster constituencies, it was first contested at the 2024 general election. It is represented by Yuan Yang of the Labour Party. The constituency is in Berkshire, on the outskirts of Reading.

== Constituency profile ==
Earley and Woodley is a suburban constituency located in Berkshire. It covers the suburban towns of Earley and Woodley which lie on the outskirts of the large town of Reading. It also contains the Reading suburb of Whitley Wood and the outlying villages of Shinfield, Three Mile Cross and Spencers Wood. The constituency contains the University of Reading and thus has a large student population. There is some deprivation in Whitley Wood, but most of the constituency is highly affluent and falls within the top 10% least-deprived areas in England. House prices are high compared to the national average.

In general, residents of the constituency are young and well-educated. They have very high levels of income and are likely to work in professional occupations. At the 2021 census, White people made up 70% of the population, with Asians (primarily Indians) forming the largest ethnic minority group at 20%. At the local council level, most of the constituency is represented by a mix of Conservative and Liberal Democrat councillors, with some Labour Party councillors in Shinfield and Whitley Wood. An estimated 54% of voters in the constituency supported remaining in the European Union in the 2016 referendum compared to 48% nationwide.

== History ==
At the time of the 2023 review of Westminster constituencies, there were eight constituencies in the county of Berkshire. Of these constituencies, only three (Reading East, Reading West, and Windsor) were within the permitted electorate range of no fewer than 69,724 electors and no more than 77,062. All of the remaining constituencies were above the upper limit. The Boundary Commission for England therefore proposed the addition of a ninth constituency within the county.

Whilst both Reading constituencies could have remained unchanged, the boundary commission instead proposed a reconfiguration to account for the increased electorates of the surrounding constituencies, and to better reflect local ties in the surrounding communities. This involved the creation of two new constituencies, Earley and Woodley and Mid Berkshire (renamed Reading West and Mid Berkshire in the final proposals), both with the bulk of their electorate outside the Borough of Reading but including outer wards of the borough, together with a new Reading Central constituency entirely within the borough.

In June 2023, the Conservatives selected Pauline Jorgensen, the leader of the opposition group on Wokingham Borough Council, as their prospective parliamentary candidate for the seat. In December 2023, the Labour Party selected Earley resident Yuan Yang, a Financial Times journalist and social campaigner, as their candidate. On 5 February 2024, the Liberal Democrats announced they had selected Tahir Maher, a former Mayor of Earley, as their candidate.

== Boundaries ==
Under the 2023 review, the constituency was defined as being composed of the following, as they existed on 1 December 2020:

- The Borough of Reading wards of Church; Whitley.
- The Borough of Wokingham wards of Bulmershe and Whitegates; Coronation; Hawkedon; Hillside; Loddon; Maiden Erlegh; Shinfield North; Shinfield South; Sonning; South Lake.

Following local government boundary reviews in Reading and Wokingham which came into effect in May 2022 and May 2024 respectively, the constituency now comprises the following from the 2024 general election:

- The Borough of Reading wards or part wards of: Church; Redlands (small part); Whitley.
- The Borough of Wokingham wards or part wards of: Bulmershe & Coronation; Hawkedon; Hillside; Loddon; Maiden Erlegh & Whitegates; Shinfield; South Lake; Spencers Wood & Swallowfield (majority); Thames (small part comprising Sonning parish).

The seat covers:

- The southern-most Borough of Reading wards of Church and Whitley, transferred respectively from the former Reading East and Reading West constituencies
- Western areas of the Borough of Wokingham previously included in the constituencies of Maidenhead, Reading East and Wokingham, including the communities of Sonning, Earley, Shinfield and Woodley

It is bordered by the seats of Reading West and Mid Berkshire, Reading Central, Henley and Thame, and Wokingham.

== Members of Parliament ==
Election	Member	Party
Created from Maidenhead, Reading East, Reading West and Wokingham
2024	Yuan Yang	Labour

== Elections ==
=== Elections in the 2020s ===
General election 2024: Earley and Woodley
Party	Candidate	Votes	%	±%
Labour	Yuan Yang	18,209	39.7	+13.0
Conservative	Pauline Jorgensen	17,361	37.8	−11.0
Liberal Democrats	Tahir Maher	6,142	13.4	−8.4
Green	Gary Shacklady	3,418	7.4	+5.2
SDP	Alastair Hunter	784	1.7	N/A
Majority		848	1.9	N/A
Turnout		45,914	62.4	▼10.5
Labour gain from Conservative		Swing	▲12.0	

=== Elections in the 2010s ===
General election 2019: Earley and Woodley (notional)
Party	Vote	%
Conservative	24,922	48.8
Labour	13,629	26.7
Liberal Democrats	11,147	21.8
Green	1,134	2.2
Brexit Party	278	0.5
Turnout	51,110	72.9

== See also ==
- Parliamentary constituencies in Berkshire
- List of parliamentary constituencies in the South East England (region)
