= Coley (Reading ward) =

Electoral ward in Berkshire, England

Coordinates: 51.447419°N 0.984791°W

Coley Ward, Borough of Reading
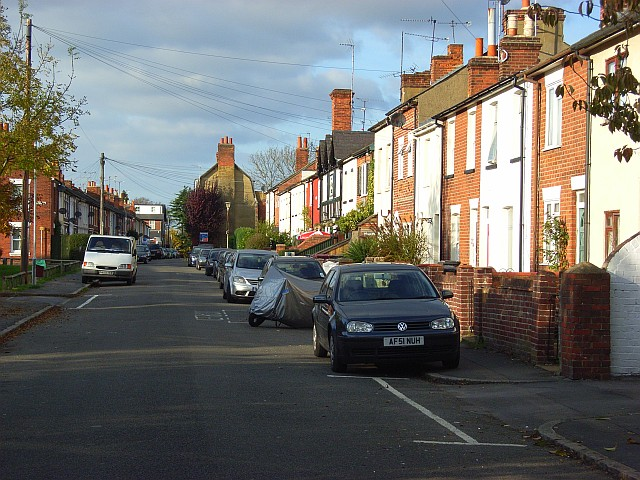
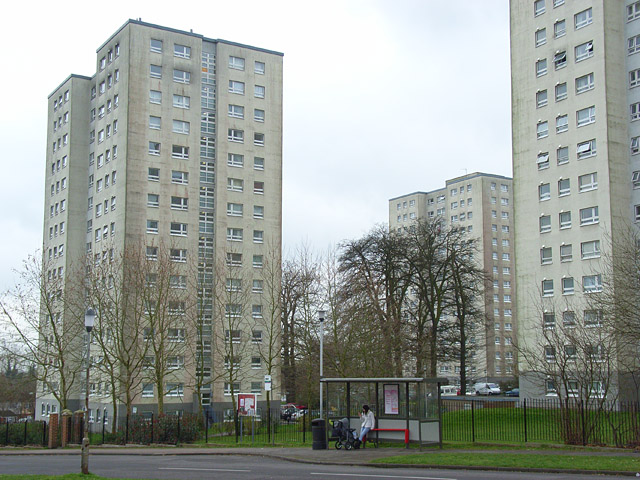
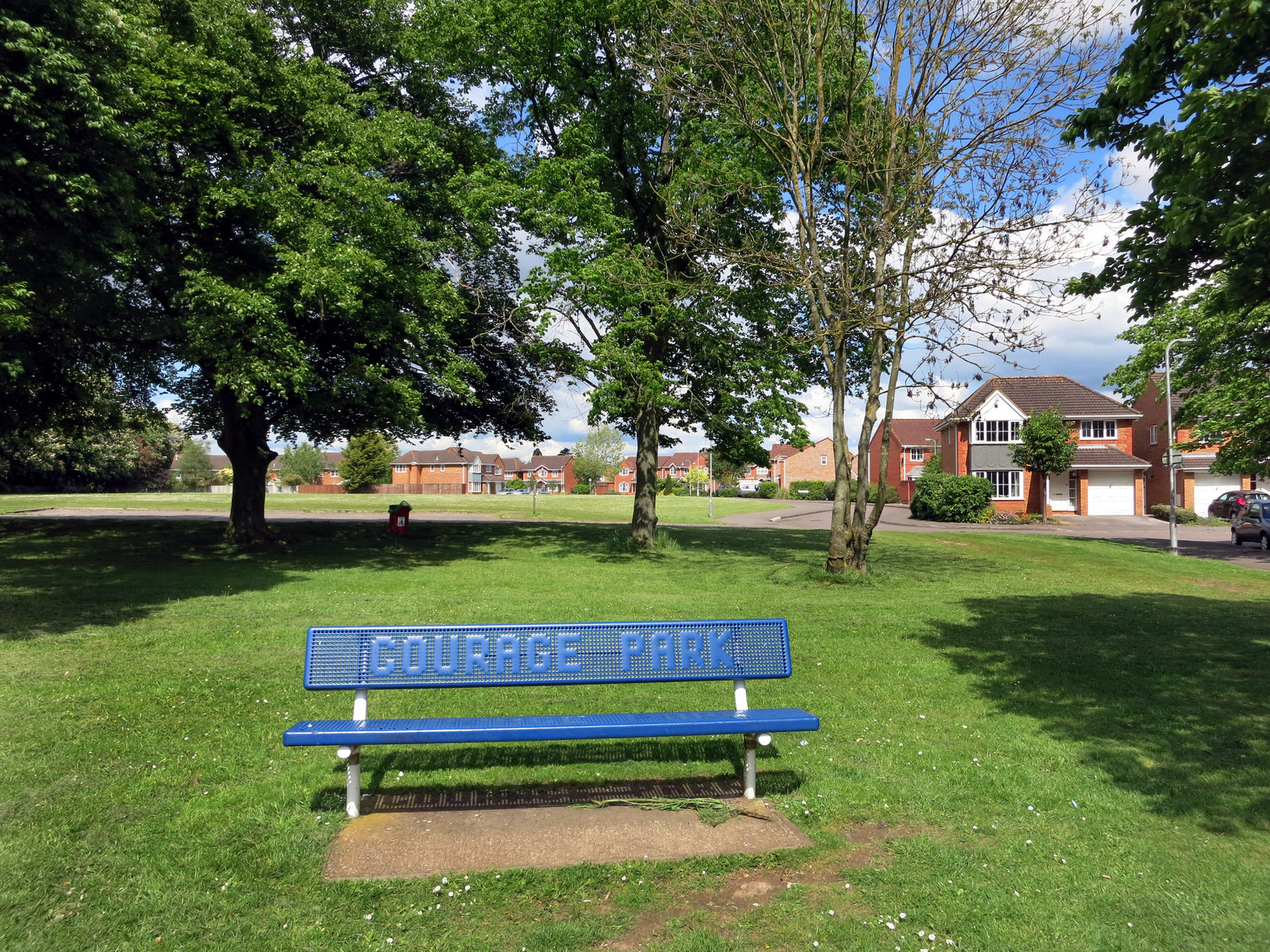
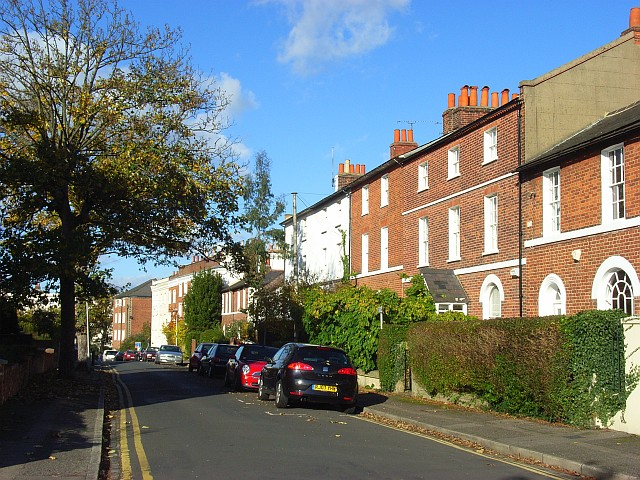
- Clockwise from top left: Brunswick Street, Coley Park flats, Coley Hill and Courage Park

- Location within Berkshire
- Area: 3.047 km^{2} (1.176 sq mi)
- Population: 11,704
  - Density: 3,841/km^{2} (9,950/sq mi)
- OS grid reference: SU7072
- Unitary authority: Reading
- Ceremonial county: Berkshire
- Region: South East
- Country: England
- Sovereign state: United Kingdom
- Police: Thames Valley
- Fire: Royal Berkshire
- Ambulance: South Central
- UK Parliament: Reading Central

Coley is an electoral ward of the Borough of Reading, in the English county of Berkshire. Until the 2022 Reading Borough Council election, it was known as Minster ward and had slightly different boundaries.

== Location ==
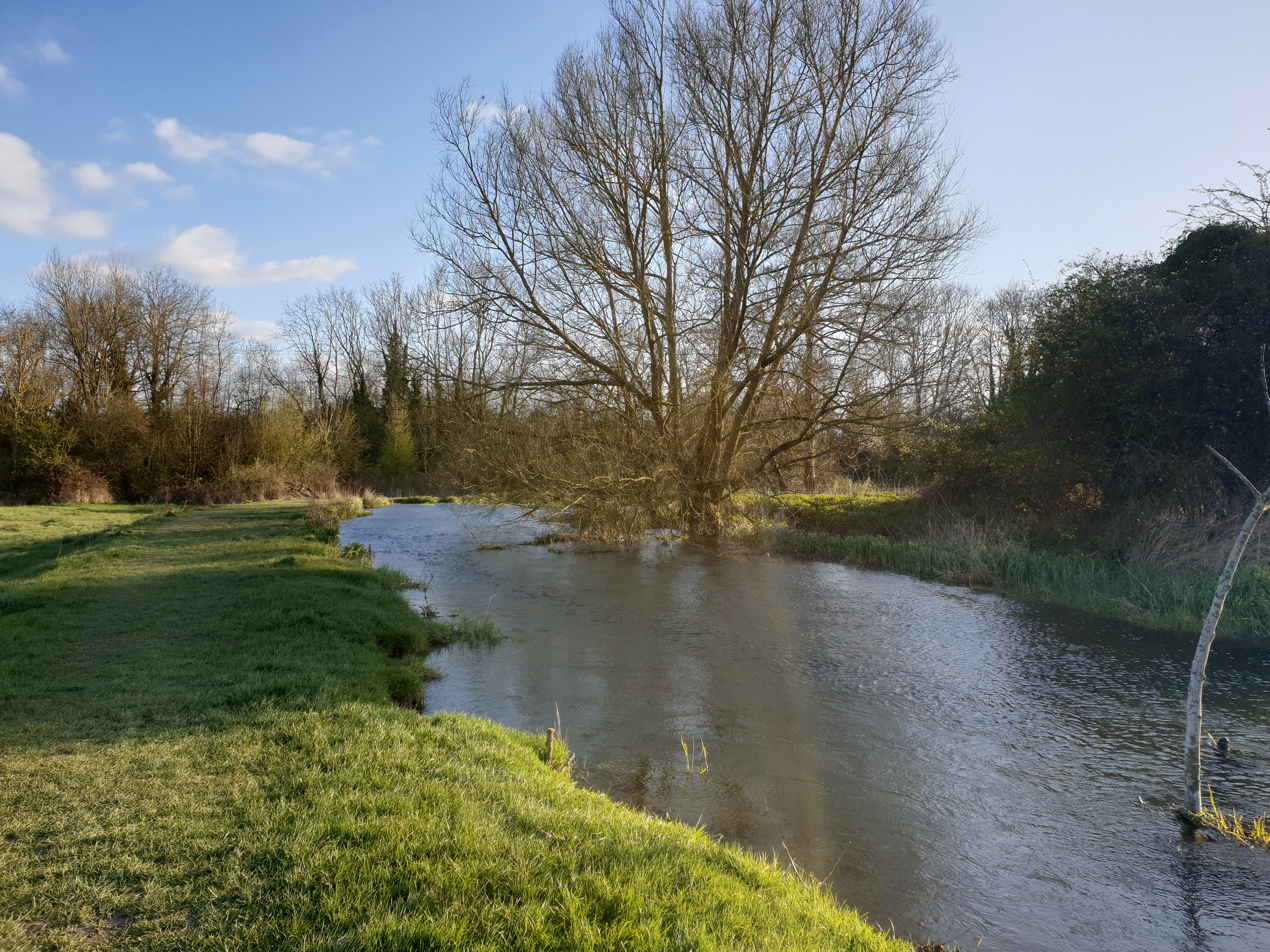
The Holy Brook on the water meadows to the south of the ward

The ward lies south-west of the town centre, comprising all of the suburbs of Coley and Coley Park, and parts of West Reading, together with a large tract of undeveloped River Kennet flood-plain to the south of Coley Park.

From the south in clockwise order the ward is bounded by the River Kennet, the Reading to Basingstoke railway line, Reading West railway station, the Oxford Road, Prospect Street, Tilehust Road, Castle Hill, and the A33 back to the River Kennet. The ward is bordered, in the same order, by Whitley, Southcote, Battle, Abbey and Katesgrove wards. It lies entirely within the Reading Central parliamentary constituency.

The principal changes to the ward boundary in 2022 were the loss of the section of the old Minster ward to the west of the railway line, bounded by Bath Road, Parkside Road and Tilehurst Road, to Southcote ward, and the loss of the strip of Minster ward to the east of the A33, as far as the River Kennet, to Katesgrove ward. Coley ward also gained the area bounded by Tilehurst Road, Reading West station, Oxford Road and Prospect Street from Battle ward.

== Profile ==
=== Demographics ===
As of 2024, Coley ward had an area of 3.047 square kilometres (1.176 sq mi) and there were 11,704 people living there. Of these, 18.8% were under 15 and 10.6% were 65 and over; 60.5% classified themselves as White, 21.8% as Asian, and 9.6% as Black, Caribbean or African; 40.3% were born outside the UK.

The population lived in 4,619 households, of which 50.2% were in a flat, maisonette or apartment, and 49.7% were in a house or bungalow. Of the households, 19.8% were owned outright by the residents, 25.8% were owned subject to a mortgage, loan or shared ownership, 34.5% were privately rented and 19.9% were socially rented.

Of the population aged over 16, 66.6% were in employment, 4.4% were unemployed, and 29.1% were economically inactive. Of those in employment, 51.4% were in managerial, professional or technical occupations. A total of 45.0% of the population were educated to university degree level.

=== Environment ===
As of 2022, Coley ward had a tree canopy cover of 17.4%, compared to figures of 17.7% for the Reading as a whole, and 16.5% for the United Kingdom. The principal public open space within the built-up part of the ward are Courage Park and Coley Recreation Ground. To the south, most of the flood plain is private farmland, but it is crossed by a number of public footpaths, including one alongside the Holy Brook.

=== Facilities ===
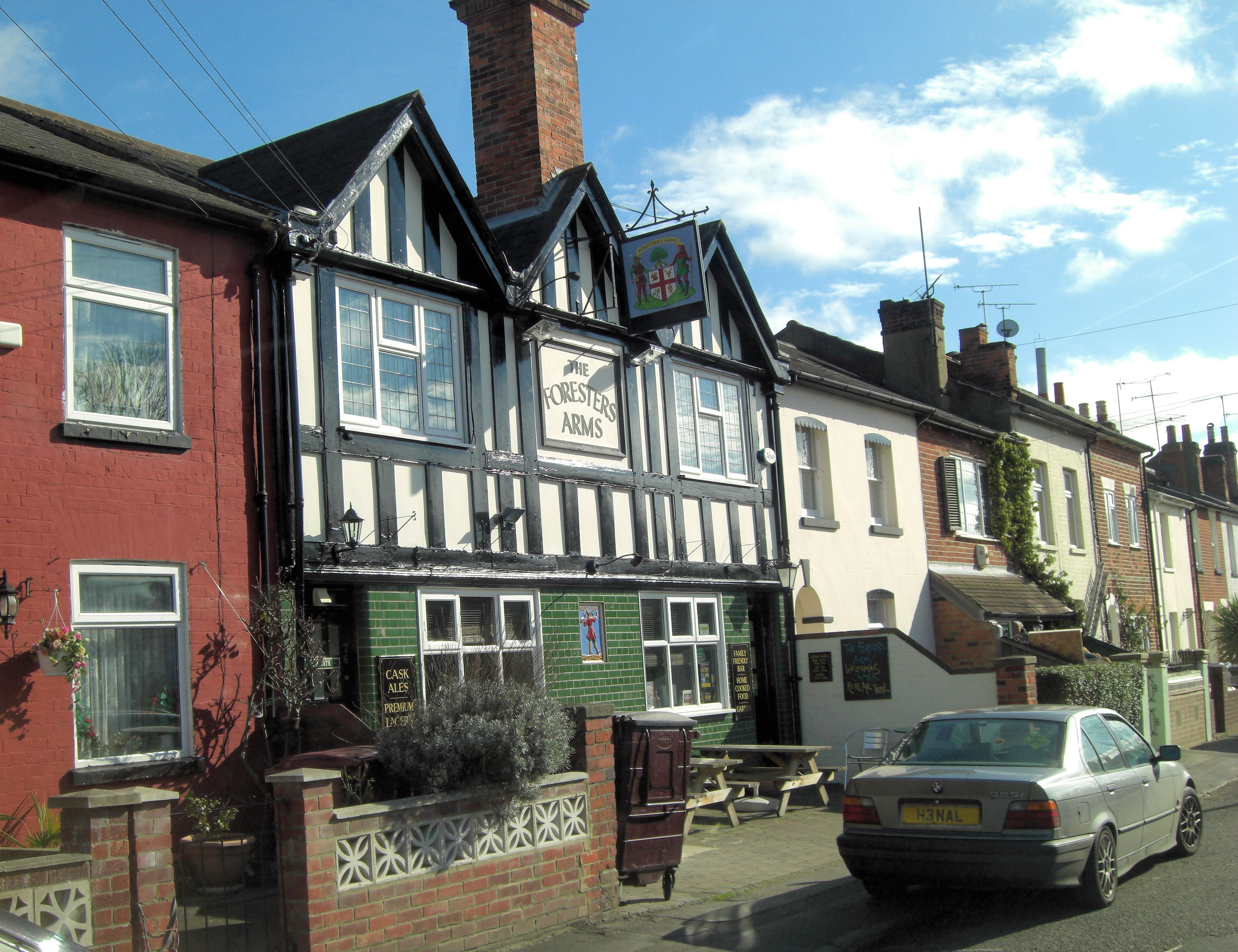
The Foresters pub

The ward includes Coley, and St Mary and All Saints primary schools, but no secondary schools. It is home to two of Reading's private hospitals: the Berkshire Independent Hospital and the Dunedin Hospital. It also includes All Saints' Church.

There is very little retail space in the ward, just a few isolated local shops and a small precinct on Wensley Road in Coley Park. There are two public houses, the Rose and Thistle on Argyle Street and the Foresters on Brunswick Street, both in the north of the ward.

== Representation ==
As with all Reading wards, the ward elects three councillors to Reading Borough Council. Elections since 2004 are generally held by thirds, with elections in three years out of four. As of May 2026, the ward councillors are Paul Gittings and Liz Terry, both of whom are members of the Labour party, and Richard Walkem, a member of the Green party.
