= Coley, Berkshire =

District in Reading, Berkshire, England

Coordinates: 51.449423°N 0.978607°W

Coley
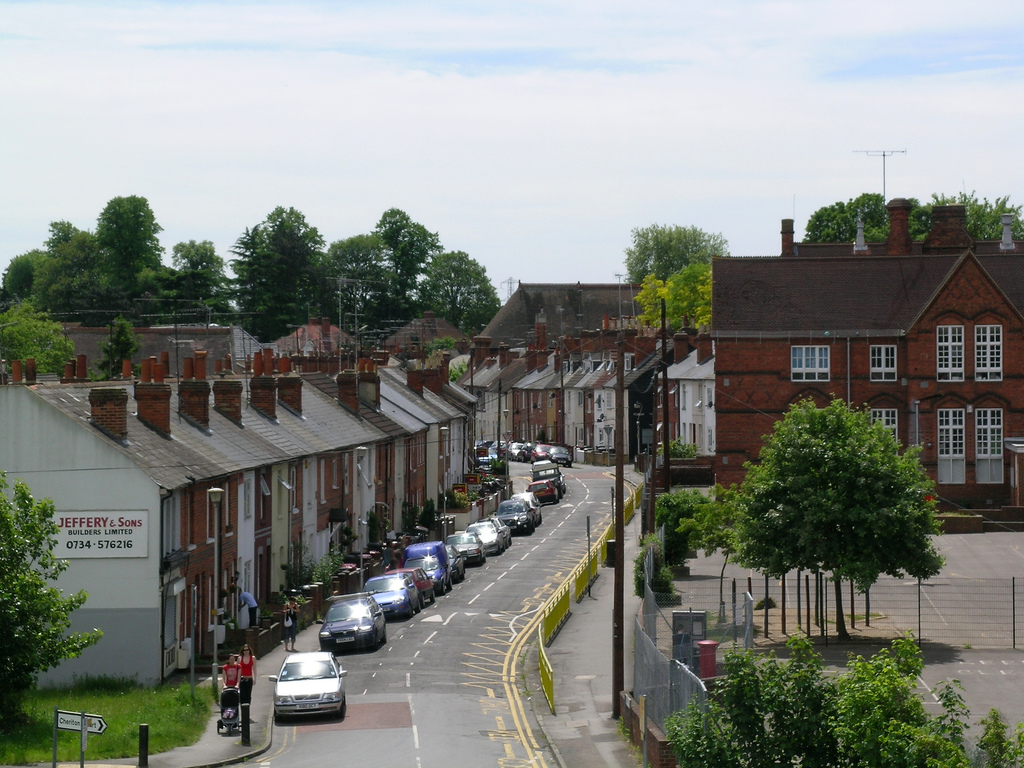
- Wolseley Street and Coley Primary School

- Location within Berkshire
- OS grid reference: SU709728
- Unitary authority: Reading
- Ceremonial county: Berkshire
- Region: South East
- Country: England
- Sovereign state: United Kingdom
- Police: Thames Valley
- Fire: Royal Berkshire
- Ambulance: South Central
- UK Parliament: Reading Central

Coley is a neighbourhood near the centre of the town of Reading, in the English county of Berkshire. It is often referred to as Old Coley, to distinguish it from the adjacent, and much more recent, suburb of Coley Park.

The district has no formal boundaries, but the historically the name referred to the area roughly bounded by Castle Street, Castle Hill and the Bath Road to the north, Berkeley Avenue to the south and west, and the River Kennet and Bridge Street to the east. Coley is bordered to its south and west by Coley Park, to its north by West Reading, and to its east by Katesgrove and the Inner Distribution Road.

The district lies entirely within the borough of Reading, in the wards of Coley, Abbey and Katesgrove. It is within the Central Reading parliamentary constituency. Coley is split between the Church of England parishes of All Saints Church and St Giles' Church, although neither church is actually within the district.

The Berkshire Record Office is located in Coley Avenue near to the junction with Bath Road.

Along with Coley Park and the wider Coley Park estate, it was formerly part of land owned by the Vachell family from about 1300 until the sale of the estate in 1727. The estate then passed to the Thompson family until 1791, and subsequently to William Chamberlayne. The Monck family were the last private owners of the estate. The former principal house on the estate now forms part of a hospital complex.

Chamberlayne was responsible for selling off the land then known as Pinkney's Mead, close to the town centre. This was obtained piecemeal by small local developers who built tiny, densely packed cottages on the site for the growing population of Reading.

Coley formerly had a railway goods yard, the Reading Central Goods station, which was connected to the main line at Southcote Junction by the Coley branch line.

Phoebe Cusden, a notable socialist, peace campaigner and Mayor of Reading, lived all her life in Coley. In 1977 she published Coley: Portrait of an Urban Village, a history of the suburb.

Old Coley housed one of Reading's largest slum communities, built in the area between Wolseley St and Castle St. Centred around the Coley Steps, courts and back-to-back housing accommodated a population of about 1,500. The slums were eventually cleared in the 1930s, with residents rehoused in the new council estates of Whitley and Norcot. In 1989 the Coley Local History Group recorded the memories of its residents in two publications "Talking of Coley" (ISBN 0951593307, 1990) and "More Talking of Coley" (1991). These were combined, extended and reissued in 2021 as "Coley Talking".
