= Southcote, Berkshire =

Suburb of Reading, Berkshire, England

Coordinates: 51.4419°N 1.0114°W

Southcote
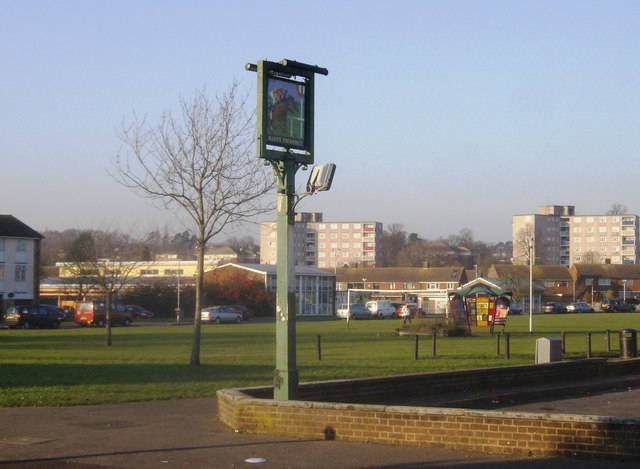
- Coronation Square in the centre of Southcote

- Location within Berkshire
- Population: 8,548 (2011 census)
- OS grid reference: SU686719
  - London: 38 miles (61 km) East
- Unitary authority: Reading
- Shire county: Berkshire
- Region: South East
- Country: England
- Sovereign state: United Kingdom
- Post town: READING
- Postcode district: RG30
- Dialling code: 0118
- Police: Thames Valley
- Fire: Royal Berkshire
- Ambulance: South Central
- UK Parliament: Reading Central

Southcote (/ˈsaʊθkət/) is a suburban neighbourhood and electoral ward of Reading in the English county of Berkshire. Located to the south-west of Reading town centre, Southcote has a population of about 8,500 (as of 2011). The settlement lies primarily between the London-to-Bath road and the River Kennet. Unusually for Reading, the suburb and ward are coterminous.

The area was sparsely populated until after the Second World War, though excavations have revealed evidence of Paleolithic and Iron Age activity in Southcote, as well as Roman and Saxon habitation. By the time William the Conqueror undertook the Domesday Survey in 1086, Southcote was sufficiently established to warrant a Lord of the manor, who at that time was William de Braose. From the 16th century onwards, Southcote Manor was owned by the Blagrave family, who sold the manor house in the 1920s. The area was subsequently developed into housing: much of the land changed from agricultural to residential. A large proportion of the land in Southcote not used for housing is classified as flood-meadow, providing flood plains between urbanisation and the River Kennet.

Residents of Southcote generally self-classify as Christian. The male life expectancy in the area is lower than the national estimate, although the female expectancy is slightly higher. Claimants of out-of-work benefits (such as Jobseeker's Allowance) are more prevalent in Southcote than in surrounding areas. Attainment in education in Southcote is lower than the Reading average, as is residents' self-evaluation of health.

Near to the settlement is Southcote Junction, where the Great Western Main Line diverges into the Reading to Taunton line and the Reading to Basingstoke line. The railways were preceded by the Kennet and Avon Canal, which passes south of the settlement. Southcote lends its name to a lock on the canal.

== History ==
=== Toponymy ===
Recorded in the Domesday Book as Sudcote, Southcote has also been referred to as Sutcot, Sudcot, Sukote, Suthcot, Suthcote, Suthcotes, and Southcoat, with the present spelling entering usage in the 15th century. Alternative spellings of Southcot and Southcott have also been used.

The name "Southcote", comparable to that of neighbouring Norcot, originates from the Old English "suth cote", meaning "south[ern] cottage". It is likely that Circuit Lane, one of the primary roads into Southcote, derives its name from "Circourt Lane", a corruption of "Southcote Lane". A similar development of names occurred at Circourt Manor near Denchworth, Oxfordshire.

=== Early history ===
Lower Paleolithic and Palaeolithic materials have been recovered in various excavations in the Southcote area. An Iron Age occupation was located when houses were constructed in the 20th century. A Saxon urn was found in Southcote in 1924. The urn contained ashes and bone fragments, and was given to the Museum of Reading. A polished stone celt was also found in Southcote in 1926. An excavation of Southcote Manor in the 1960s uncovered many Roman, Romano-British and medieval artefacts such as sherds and pottery; a sample of the latter was discovered to have originated in Oxford in the 2nd century. Similarly, a Pannonian brooch and samian ware have been found in the area, and Roman pottery was found in the vicinity of the clay pits at Prospect Park Brick Works. Later inhabitation of Southcote was discovered at Anslow's Cottages south of the Kennet, where excavation suggests that a Bronze Age waterfront was made on a branch of the river. A 1991 report by the Historic Buildings and Monuments Commission for England—now known as English Heritage—detailed the discovery of fragments of twined basketry at Anslow's Cottages, showing that eel or fish traps were used on the river near Southcote. Archaeological findings of timber structures adjacent to the trap suggest that it dated from the eight or ninth century. Later discoveries, made in the 1980s during gravel extraction in the area, also uncovered evidence of a landing stage or jetty on the river channel.

=== 11th–15th century ===
The settlement of Southcote grew largely around the medieval house at Southcote Manor. Before the Norman Conquest, Southcote was held by Brictward—a Saxon landowner and priest—under Edward the Confessor. The settlement was documented in the Domesday Book as Sudcote with a total population of 13 households, consisting of five villagers and eight smallholders, though a manor house is not mentioned. At this time Southcote was mostly ploughlands, but had a mill and a fishery, and was valued at £5. The Lord of the manor at the time was William de Braose, 1st Lord of Bramber. In the early 1200s a house was built and Southcote was owned by Henry Belet. This house had two moats, supplied with water by a channel from the nearby Holy Brook. Upon Henry's death the estate was inherited by his son Michael, who was cup-bearer to Henry II. In 1337, a grant of free warren was made to the Belet family for the manor.

In 1365 the manor and 13th-century moated house passed into the Restwold family, and it passed through marriage to the Drew family of Seagry, Wiltshire, then the Sambourne family. Margaret Sambourne, the heir to the manor, died in 1494 and an inquisition the following year suggested that she held the manor (then valued at £20) as a trustee on behalf of Hugh Kenepy. Around this time a brick house was built to replace the earlier dwelling. After the death of Sambourne's son, Drew, an inquisition reported in contradiction that the manor was held by the Abbot of Reading; in their work on the Berkshire section of Victoria County History, Peter Ditchfield and William Henry Page write that at this point "the correct tenure had evidently been lost". Through Drew Sambourne's granddaughter, Margaret, the manor passed through marriage to William Windsor, 2nd Baron Windsor. William's grandson, Henry (5th Baron Windsor), sold the manor to Anthony Blagrave by the early 16th century.

=== 16th–19th century ===
The Blagrave family were wealthy landowners around Reading, and the manor passed down through the family (which included mathematician John Blagrave, who built a new house at Southcote); a lease document dated from 1596 suggests that the manor was divided between three Blagrave brothers. Daniel Blagrave, a cousin of John, inherited the manor on the latter's death in 1611. At the time of the English Civil War, during the siege of Reading in 1643, the Blagraves allowed Robert Devereux, 3rd Earl of Essex to use the manor as his headquarters. The Blagrave family, who were sympathetic to the Roundheads, are said to have hosted Oliver Cromwell, John Hampden and Robert Blake for a council of war in one of the house's oak panelled rooms. In January 1649, Daniel was one of the signatories of Charles I's death warrant.

In 1665 Elias Ashmole wrote to Mervyn Tuchet, 4th Earl of Castlehaven at "Southcote neere Redding". At some point that century the manor house was largely rebuilt and modernised; the existing 15th century guardhouse and vaulted well were retained. Come the Restoration in 1660 after the end of the war, Daniel fled from England and died in Aix-la-Chapelle in 1668. Southcote saw development with the opening of the Kennet Navigation in the 1720s, where the River Kennet was made navigable by vessels as far upstream as Newbury; industrialisation along the canal continued for the next century.

Throughout the 18th century the manor continued to pass through the Blagrave family, including John Blagrave MP. In 1778, Frances Blagrave married John Blagrave of Watchfield (Ditchfield and Page suggest that the couple were not related before marriage). In 1813, Daniel and Samuel Lysons wrote that the manor and mansion house were unoccupied but remained the property of the Blagrave family, who at that point resided at nearby Calcot Park. The same year, Calvespit House (near Calvespit Farm to the west of Southcote Manor) was renamed Southcott Lodge and incorporated into the estate. Between 1828 and 1850 the house was let to Charles and Frances Lutyens, whose son Charles was born at the house and who later fathered the architect Sir Edwin Lutyens.

Southcote was mentioned in Samuel Lewis's 1835 Topographical Dictionary of England. It was described as a tything within the parish of St Mary's, Reading, and had a population of 84.

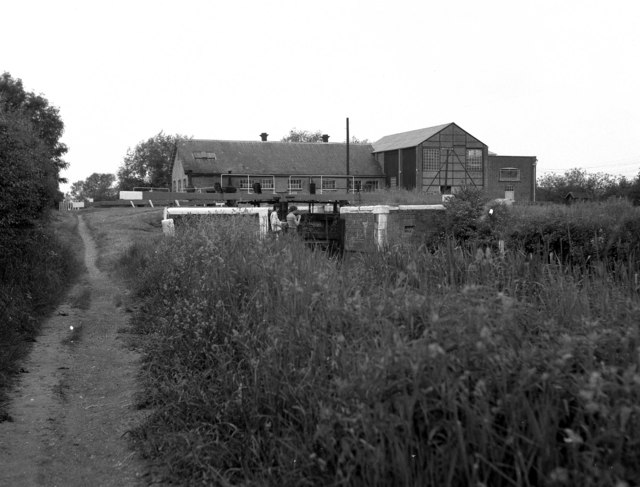
Southcote Water Works (pictured in the 1970s) was built in the mid-19th century to pump water into Reading

In 1847, the Reading to Taunton branch of the Great Western Main Line was built through Southcote. The following year the Reading to Basingstoke line opened to the east of Southcote; the railways diverging at Southcote Junction. Two years later, in 1850, a water pumping station was built alongside the Kennet and Avon Canal at Southcote Lock. The facility, owned by the Reading Corporation, was connected to the Bath Road Reservoir (1.1 miles (1.8 km) north-east) and provided Reading with a source of water that originated upstream of any pollutants from the town.

In 1860 the occupant was Louisa Mundy, widow of Lieutenant Governor of Jersey Godfrey Mundy. Louisa was the niece of Henry Herbert, 2nd Earl of Carnarvon, and lived at Southcote with her sons Herbert and Cyril. By this time, Southcote had expanded to a population of 87, with 14 houses. In his Imperial Gazetteer of England and Wales, John Marius Wilson stated that the real property of Southcote was valued at £608.

After the Mundys' tenure, Southcote Manor was let to the Brisco (or Briscoe) family, who had made their money in slave trading and plantation ownership. The family were relatives of Hastings MP Musgrave Brisco and inheritors of the Pryce baronetcy. Along with one of his labourers, James Wastel (Note: James Wastel Brisco's name is alternatively given as James Westall Brisco) Brisco was taken to court in Reading in 1874, charged with the "assault with intent to ravish" a 13-year-old servant girl. During the trial, the Reading Observer reported that "several rumours were in circulation that a person connected with the case had committed suicide". Brisco supposedly used his wealth and social status to dissuade witnesses from testifying and the case was apparently abandoned.

Brisco was eccentric and wealthy, and added a ballroom to the building in 1891, replacing a timber chapel. He also began construction of the house's distinctive tower the same year but died before it was complete and building work was abandoned.

=== 20th century ===
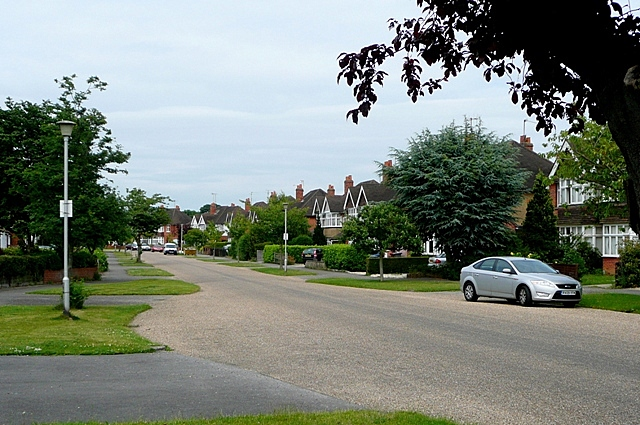
Southcote Park Estate, a private road community, was established in the 1930s

The manor of Southcote remained in the Blagrave family until the early 20th century, when it was owned by Henry Barry Blagrave. Henry died in 1927, though the manor house was demolished in 1921 after lying empty following the death of Wastel Brisco and his wife Sarah in 1891 and 1901 respectively. In 1920 the house had been purchased by a contractor with intentions to demolish the site, though the Society for the Protection of Ancient Buildings organised a committee to attempt to raise money to save the house. The Sphere reported that the bricks and oak panelling were in demand and were likely removed for re-use before the building's demolition.

In 1908 Reading Central Goods railway station was opened on the Coley branch line diverting at Southcote Junction. During the first few decades of the 20th century, however, most of Southcote remained rural and undeveloped. An Ordnance Survey map of 1914 shows the majority of land as agricultural (farms and nurseries) with a number of gravel pits and smithies. The 1930s saw the construction of the Southcote Park Estate, a housing estate built on land inherited after the death of William Berkeley Monck of Coley Park. An Ordnance Survey map of 1938 shows greater provision for the population (as opposed to industry); some of the gravel pits no longer existed and Presentation College, a boys' school, had opened in two large Victorian buildings—Rotherfield Grange and Oakland Hall, the latter a suburban villa built in the 1870s. By the advent of World War II, Southcote had begun to experience urban sprawl from Reading and the land bordering the Great Western Railway had begun to be used for housing. Following the war, Denton's Field on the Bath Road in Southcote was used for celebratory events; Battle of Britain commemorative fêtes were held in September 1949 and 1950, and featured a performance by three Alsatians—Rocky, Lindy and Irma—to recognise their work in the war. Denton's Field gained reputation as a location for outdoor community events, and was comparable to places such as Caversham Park and Palmer Park.

In the 1950s, a huge building project centred around Coronation Square (named for the 1953 Coronation of Queen Elizabeth II) with hundreds of council houses built to satisfy post-war demand. The residents of many of these had moved from houses in central and east Reading that fell short of sanitation requirements of the Public Health Act 1875, were compulsorily purchased and later demolished.

The gatehouse at Southcote Manor stood until the 1960s, when a fire broke out. It was demolished by 1964 to make way for housing. Reading Central Goods station was closed in 1983, and with it the branch line from Southcote ceased to operate. Two years later the track bed and sleepers were removed.

The same decade a campaign was started to raise £1 million to save the decaying mansion in Prospect Park; in 1986 the building was described as "crumbling" and "likely to be demolished", though plans existed to convert the building into offices. In the 1990s, however, the building was renovated and re-opened as a restaurant.

In 2004, Presentation College went into administration. It was taken over by the Society of Licensed Victuallers and renamed The Elvian School. The school closed in 2010. Following its closure, Taylor Wimpey applied to build 193 new homes on the site, competing with a proposal by a community group (the West Reading Education Network) to reopen the site as a free school known as the WREN. The housing plan was rejected, but Taylor Wimpey then appealed to Reading Borough Council and submitted a revised plan for 120 homes, which left room for the school. The appeal was taken to the High Court, which ruled that the site should be used solely for education; the school opened for Year Seven pupils on 7 September 2015.

== Geography ==
The boundaries of Southcote are formed by Calcot Park to the north-west, the northern edge of Prospect Park to the north, the Reading to Basingstoke railway line to the east and by channels of the River Kennet to the south. The western boundary runs through housing in the Fords Farm area. Beyond the south-west and western boundaries, in West Berkshire, are the wards of Burghfield and Calcot.

Less formally, Southcote is bordered by the settlements of Horncastle and Fords Farm to the west, Tilehurst to the north, West Reading to the north east, Coley Park to the east, Whitley to the south-east and Pingewood to the south.

=== Topography ===
Southcote is bordered to the south by the Holy Brook and the River Kennet; as such much of the land in the south of the area is floodplain. The proximity of Southcote to the river has led to flooding of roads and residences, particularly during the 2013–2014 United Kingdom winter floods. Flooding is exacerbated by the routes of the Holy Brook and railway line; the railway crosses the stream by bridges and culverts and in some locations the embankment acts as a bund, inhibiting the dissipation of floodwater. Similarly, a report by West Berkshire Council found that during the 2013–14 floods the single track road between the Holy Brook and the Kennet at Southcote Mill "acted as a barrier until the rising waters backing up in the flood plain fields finally breached". Network Rail's plans for electrification of the Great Western Main Line include provision for flood defences where the line is in proximity to the Holy Brook.

The elevation of Southcote ranges from almost 100 metres (330 ft) in the north-west extreme of the ward (SRTM data records this as 94 metres (308 ft), Ordnance Survey as 92 metres (302 ft)) to approximately 37 metres (121 ft) in the floodplains north and south of the Kennet.

=== Geology ===
The geology of Southcote includes the Reading Formation—rock strata in the Lambeth Group consisting of clay, silt and sand formed in the Palaeogene period. Bedrock in Southcote is also formed of chalk, with geological surveys also finding flint samples. A map produced by the Geological Survey of Great Britain in 1860 identifies the area as being predominantly Plastic Clay (now known as the Lambeth Group) and chalk north of the river, with flint and gravel samples typical of the Bagshot Formation south of the Kennet. More specifically, the 2000 survey showed different types of gravel, including Winter Hill (variably clayey and sandy), Lynch Hill (sand and gravel with lenses of silt, clay or peat), and head (a polymict deposit usually formed by periglacial solifluction or gelifluction). The survey also identified that much of the land south of the Kennet is "infilled" or "worked" ground; this area was formerly gravel pits and now used for leisure. The British Geological Survey defines infilled ground as "areas where the ground has been cut away then wholly or partially backfilled" and worked ground as "areas where the ground has been cut away such as quarries and road cuttings".

=== Built environment ===
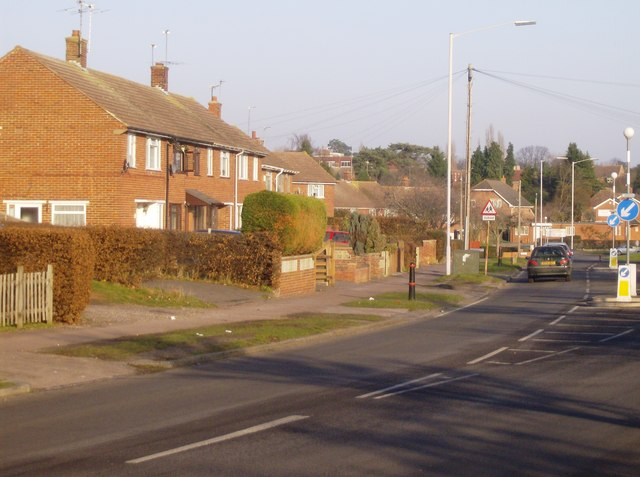
Semi-detached and short terraced properties make up much of Southcote's housing

The settlement is concentrated to the south of the Bath Road (A4). Southcote consists substantially of planned post-war housing, much of which is Wates-constructed prefabricated housing. The majority of dwellings are semi-detached, which account for 37.7% of all residences. 29.1% of dwellings are flats, and 23.5% are terraces. Reading's first high-rise dwellings—three eight-storey tower blocks—were built in Southcote in the late 1950s. Home ownership in Southcote is 58.3%, which is average for the Reading area. Use of social housing is above the local average at 29.2%.

Southcote's main thoroughfare is Southcote Lane which runs east–west through the area, connecting Southcote to Fords Farm (to the west) and Coley (to the east). Southcote is centred around Coronation Square, an area of open grassland surrounded by community facilities and commercial premises. To the north of the Bath Road is Prospect Park, a large urban park surrounding the Mansion House. Development to the south of Southcote is restricted by the Holy Brook and the Great Western Main Line, and although the land is used for recreation, proposals are occasionally put forward to build housing on the floodplains. The land south of the railway line is subject to a Tree Preservation Order (TPO). This land is defined by Reading Borough Council as Southcote Meadows, and stretches from the Burghfield Road (near to the western boundary of Southcote) to Milkmaid's Bridge at the foot of Southcote Lock. Other parts of Southcote are subject to similar restrictions, including areas adjacent to (but north of) the railway embankment, trees lining the Kennet and Avon Canal west of Southcote Lock, and various individual sites.

=== Parks and open spaces ===
Prospect Park, one of the largest open spaces in Reading, is in Southcote Ward. Smaller parks such as Linear Park and Southcote Farm Lane playground are in the community. Coronation Square is a designated green space in the centre of Southcote.

Bordering Prospect Park is Devil's Dip, a former gravel and clay pit. The site is recognised by Reading Borough Council as an area of wildlife and historical interest, and examples of elm, walnut, ash, horse chestnut and sycamore trees grow there. Other flora found at the site include nettle, bramble and elder, with flowers such as lesser celandine, bluebells and Queen Anne's lace appearing in the spring. Peacock butterflies and various species of woodland bird are prevalent in the area.

== Demography ==
According to the United Kingdom Census 2011, the population of the Southcote area was 8,548, of which 48% were male and 52% female. This is an increase of 58 residents compared to the 2001 census. Censuses before this cannot be compared, as the ward boundaries (and therefore population) changed after the 1991 census.

The majority of residents of Southcote Ward (58.6%) identify as Christian, with people specifying "no religion" counting for 24.9% of the population. The second most prevalent religion in Southcote is Islam, with 6% of people identifying as Muslim. The vast majority of Southcote residents (73.4%) are White British; the Reading average is 65%. Almost one in twenty (4.3%) of residents identify as Black African, 4% of mixed heritage, 3% Pakistani, 3% Indian and 2% Black Caribbean. 82.9% of the population in Southcote were born in the UK, and 91.3% speak English as their first language. 1.5% of residents do not speak English well.

The life expectancy in Southcote is 77.5 years for males—lower than the national estimate of 78.3—and the expectancy for females (82.6 years) is slightly higher than the national estimate (82.3 years).

The census counted Southcote in Reading's labour market, where 75.6% of the population is deemed as economically active. 71.9% of the population are engaged in employment, and 6.5% are classified as unemployed. Out-of-work benefit payments (such as Jobseeker's Allowance, incapacity, lone parent, disability and carer benefits) in Southcote are higher than the Reading average.

80.2% of Southcote's residence evaluate their health as "good", although this is lower than the Reading average of 85.5%.

== Government ==
=== National government ===
Southcote is part of the Reading Central parliamentary constituency, currently represented by Matt Rodda of the Labour party.

=== Local government ===
Southcote forms an electoral ward of the Borough of Reading. The ward has the same boundaries as the neighbourhood, and is bounded to the north by the wards of Norcot, to the north-east by Battle, to the east by Coley and to the south-east by Whitley. To the south, south-west and west Southcote is bounded by the West Berkshire civil parishes of Burghfield, Holybrook and Tilehurst Without.

As with all Reading wards, Southcote elects three councillors to Reading Borough Council. Elections since 2004 are generally held by thirds, with elections in three years out of four. The ward councillors are currently John Ennis, Graeme Hoskin and Ulrike Magyarosy, all of whom are members of the Labour party.

=== Community government ===
Southcote has a number of action groups, including the Southcote Community Association (for general residents' interests), the Southcote Neighbourhood Action Group (for a police and council relations), and Southcote Globe (for environmental issues). Southcote Park Estate, a large area of semi-detached housing on unadopted roads built in 1933, has an elected volunteer committee.

== Economy ==
Historically the land at Southcote was used for farming and gravel extraction. Farms such as Calvespit Farm (SU683716), Honey End Farm (SU684725), Southcote Manor Farm (SU691718), and Southcote Farm (SU695719) were in the area. The 1888 Kelly's Directory lists some residents of Southcote Lane as being employed as coachmen, butlers, gardeners, labourers, florists, dairy farmers, thatchers and carters. One resident was a member of the county police, and Major-General C J Addington resided at Southcote Lodge. An Ordnance Survey map surveyed in the 1870s also identifies a vinery and kennels.

The farming and gravel industries declined with the expansion of Reading after the Second World War, though the existence of the anti-extraction groups "Save Southcote Meadows" and "Residents Against Gravel Extraction" (RAGE) in the 1980s suggests the demand for such industry in the area remained. By the mid-1980s, the Tarmac Group reportedly owned land near the site of Southcote Manor with the intent of extracting gravel there.

There are two primary centres of economic activity in Southcote—Coronation Square and Southcote Farm Lane. Coronation Square is home to a number of commercial and community premises, including a post office, takeaway food outlets, newsagents, healthcare businesses and a pet shop; as well as a community centre and library. The square also featured a public house until its demolition in 2011; the land was subsequently used for affordable housing. Southcote Farm Lane has a small parade of shops and businesses including a convenience store and hairdressers. On the border of Southcote and Tilehurst is the Meadway Precinct, which includes a supermarket, pharmacy, as well as other smaller shops. The precinct opened in 1967, and a survey in 2012 revealed that the public thought the site had become run-down and required modernisation. In 2015 a planning application was submitted to Reading Borough Council by a developer who planned to renovate the site.

== Culture and community ==
In the years following the Second World War, Southcote hosted a number of community events on Denton's Field. Many of these fêtes included grasstrack motorcycle racing events, which were held in 1947, 1948 and 1949. Speedway stars Bill Kitchen and George Wilks raced at Southcote in 1949 for a Conservative Party fête. The field was also used in 1949 for a gymkhana and a church fundraising fête.

Southcote holds an annual May fayre in Coronation Square; the 2015 event was organised by community groups from local churches and community centres. The event focuses on cuisine, live music and children's entertainment.

The Reading branch of the Kennet and Avon Canal Trust meet at Southcote for talks and meetings, and undertake maintenance work on the canal through the Southcote area.

=== Public services ===
Southcote is within Thames Valley Police's catchment, and is grouped as a neighbourhood with Norcot. Residents identified nuisance and illegal parking and excessive speed as of concern in the area, as well as the antisocial use of mini motos, quad bikes and motorcycles on the Kennet towpath. Measures to alleviate nuisance parking were introduced in early 2015 with a ban on parking on the road verge. In June 2015, signs were installed on the lane to Southcote Mill to warn motorcycle users of their prohibition on that right of way.

The majority of reported crime in Southcote is categorised as either violent or sexual attacks, where 46 incidents of this nature were reported in June 2015 within a 1-mile (1.6 km) radius of Coronation Square. The highest concentration of crime occurs near the service station on the A4 road. Neighbourhood liaison sessions (known as "Have Your Say" meetings) are held in Coronation Square.

A surgery, operated by the Berkshire Healthcare NHS Foundation Trust, is located at the junction of Circuit Lane and Southcote Lane. In late 2014 the practice was the subject of significant local media coverage when all five of the surgery's general practitioners resigned. Other NHS facilities in Southcote include Prospect Park Hospital (catering for in-patient mental health and psychiatric intensive care) and the Dutchess of Kent Hospice, which is also part of the Sue Ryder group. The NHS's North and West Reading Clinical Commissioning Group's headquarters is located in Southcote on the Bath Road.

Southcote has a number of council-funded community facilities, including a library, a community centre, and a children's centre. A number of community organisations, such as an elderly residents' social club, litter picking groups, and allotments are in existence in the area. Reading's RESCUE (Rivers and Environmental Spaces Clean-Up Event), a rural litter-picking initiative, operates periodically in the parks and along the tracks and towpaths in Southcote.

== Transport ==
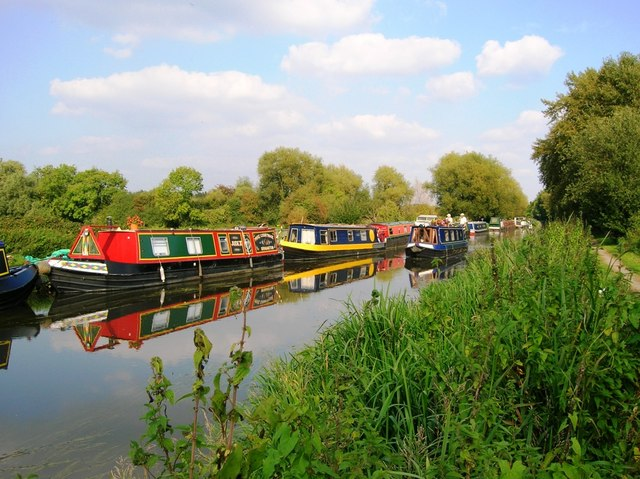
The Kennet Navigation passes through Southcote

Southcote is situated north of the M4 Motorway, approximately halfway between junctions 11 (Reading central) and 12 (Reading west).

The Reading to Taunton branch of the Great Western Mainline railway bisects Southcote laterally. At the eastern boundary of the settlement is Southcote Junction, where the Reading to Taunton and Reading to Basingstoke Lines diverge. A third line—the Coley branch line—ran from the junction until its closure in the 1980s. There are a number of Brunel-designed brick arch bridges along the Reading to Taunton line through Southcote, two of which have been described as "notably well preserved examples" and are designated "heritage assets" by Network Rail. A third bridge, which carries the main Burghfield to Reading road, may have originally been timber before being replaced with a steel deck by the Great Western Railway company.

Southcote is linked to Reading by a number of Reading Buses services along the A4 Bath Road, with some services stopping within Southcote itself. One service, named "Jet Black", links Reading to Newbury via Southcote.

The Kennet and Avon Canal at Southcote is still used for pleasure boating; moorings for narrowboats are located between Southcote Lock and Burghfield Bridge. The canal is accessible from footpaths near Burghfield Bridge, Southcote Mill and Fobney Lock, and the towpath through Southcote is a designated portion of National Cycle Route 4.

During the First World War, an aerodrome was established near to Southcote at Coley Park. Aviator Henri Salmet based himself at Woodley Aerodrome, from which he gave "joyrides" in his Blériot Aéronautique aeroplane, but also gave flights in a Blériot XI from the Kennet meadows in Southcote. In 1915 a Farman aeroplane crash-landed at Southcote Farm next to Southcote Junction. The pilot was able to jump from the plane before it crashed, and ran alongside it until it collided with a hedge near the railway embankment.

== Education ==
Three primary schools are situated in Southcote—Manor Primary School, Holy Brook Special Educational Needs School, and Southcote Primary School. In each of their most recent (2015) Ofsted inspections, the schools achieved a "good" rating.

Three secondary schools are in operation in Southcote. King's Academy Prospect is a specialist sport and ICT school run under the academy system. In its latest Ofsted report, the school was judged to require improvement. The other secondary school in Southcote is The Blessed Hugh Faringdon Catholic School, a Catholic school named after the Reading abbot Hugh Cook alias Faringdon. The school was deemed to be "good" in its latest Ofsted inspection. In September 2015, the third school—The Wren School—opened on the site of the former Elvian School. This operates as a free school, and was envisaged by a volunteer network after Reading Borough Council identified a shortfall in school capacity in 2012.

As of 2011 educational attainment in Southcote is lower than the Reading and national average. 47% of students at GCSE (or equivalent) attain five or more A* to C passes, compared to the Reading figure of 57% and 61% nationally. The number of students achieving Level 2 writing at Key Stage 1 is 83%—the same as in the wider Reading area—though the national percentage is higher at 85%. Overall, the proportion of Southcote residents with no qualifications is higher than Reading.

Based at Stoneham Court, within the grounds of Prospect School, is the headquarters (and central Berkshire base) of the Berkshire Maestros music school.

== Religious sites ==
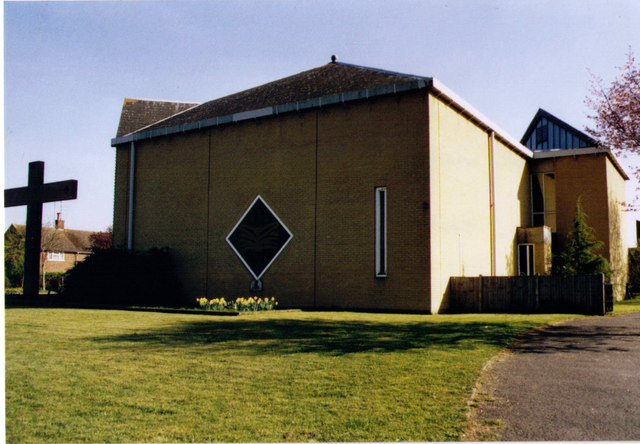
St Matthew's, Southcote's Anglican church

Southcote is in the Reading Deanery of the Diocese of Oxford. Southcote's Anglican church is dedicated to St Matthew. A United Reformed Church was built in 1958, shortly after the Southcote housing estate became occupied, and a Christian Mission was established in Southcote in 1965. The Catholic Church of English Martyrs is situated adjacent to Prospect Park at the northernmost boundary of Southcote ward. The Kennet Valley Free Church is just beyond the Southcote—Fords Farm boundary.

Provision for other faiths is found closer to Reading town centre and in East Reading.

== Sport ==
Southcote's main football club is Southcote Colts. The under-13 team won the 2014–15 East Berkshire Third Division without being beaten. The under-14 and under-16 teams both currently play in their respective Premier Division of the Peter Houseman Youth League. The under-15 team is currently in the "A" league of the Oxford Mail Youth Football League.

== Notable people ==
- The Blagrave family:

- John Blagrave (c.1561–1611), mathematician
- Daniel Blagrave (1603–1668), Member of Parliament and signatory of Charles I's death warrant
- John Blagrave (1630–1704), Member of Parliament

- Derek Watkins (1945–2013), trumpeter who appeared on every James Bond film soundtrack until his death after Skyfall.
- Michael Bond (1926–2017), author and creator of Paddington Bear
