= West Reading =

West Reading may refer to:

- West Reading, Berkshire, a district of the English town of Reading
- West Reading, Pennsylvania, a borough in the US state of Pennsylvania

== See also ==
- Reading West (disambiguation)
