= Coley Park =

Suburb of Reading, Berkshire, England

Coordinates: 51°26′41″N 0°59′11″W

- Suburb
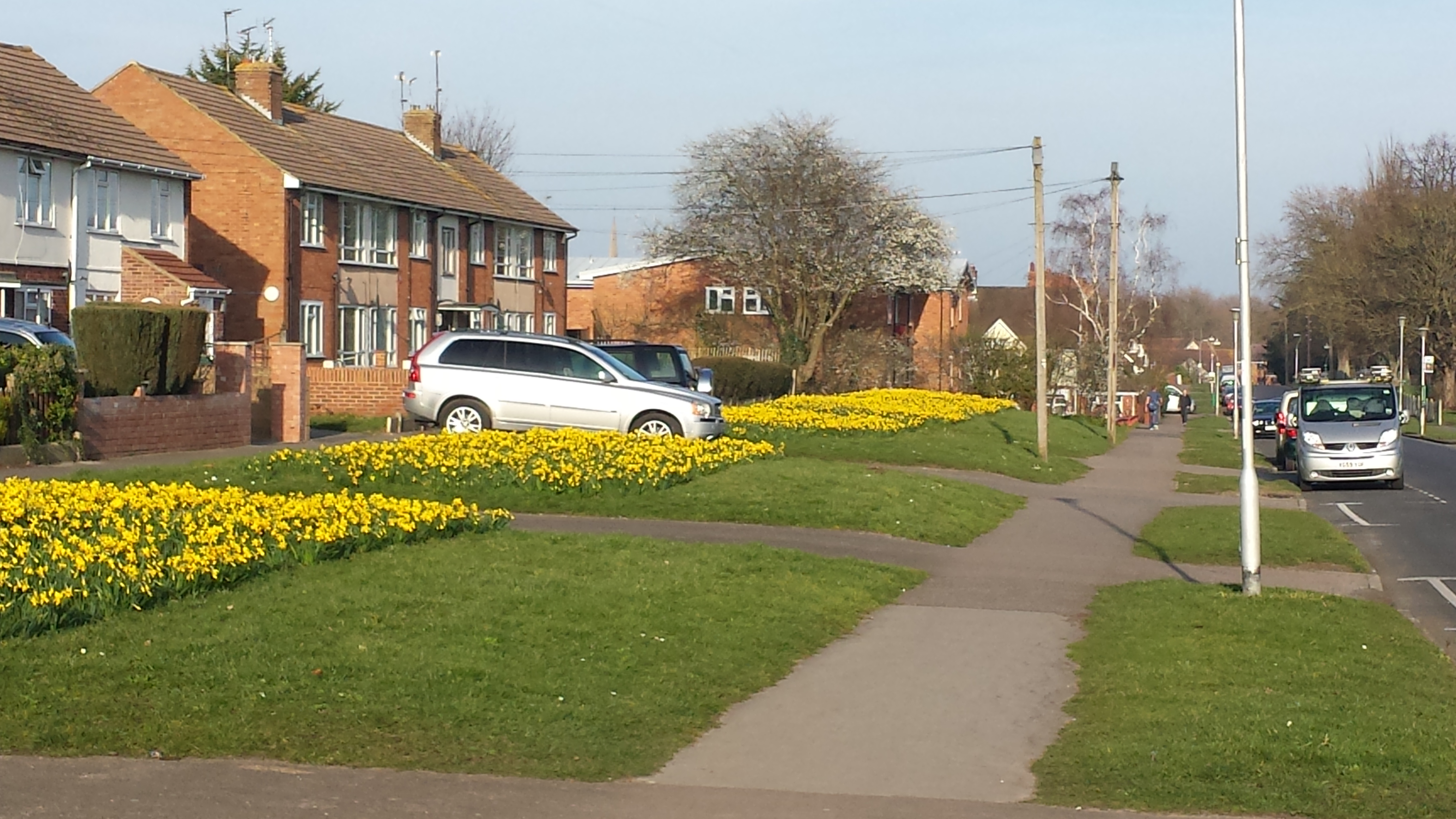
- Wensley Road with daffodils

- Location within Berkshire
- OS grid reference: SU704723
- Unitary authority: Reading
- Ceremonial county: Berkshire
- Region: South East
- Country: England
- Sovereign state: United Kingdom
- Police: Thames Valley
- Fire: Royal Berkshire
- Ambulance: South Central
- UK Parliament: Reading Central

Coley Park is a suburb to the south of the town of Reading in the English county of Berkshire. It is largely built on the country estate of the same name, surrounding Coley House. It is primarily a residential area, although it is also home to the Berkshire Independent Hospital and has previously been the site of government offices.

== Geography ==
Coley Park is an area of south-west Reading, bounded to the north by the Berkeley Avenue and the older district of Coley, to the south and east by the River Kennet, and to the west by the Reading to Basingstoke railway line, and the suburb of Southcote. To the south, the Holy Brook marks the limit of the built-up area, with the water meadows of the Kennet Valley beyond, crossed by the now disused Coley branch line beyond. Besides the water meadows, there are two public open spaces within the suburb, Courage Park and Coley Recreation Ground.

Coley Park lies entirely within the borough of Reading, in Coley ward. It is within the Reading Central parliamentary constituency. The suburb is split between the Church of England parishes of All Saints Church and St Giles' Church, although neither church is actually within the area.

== History ==
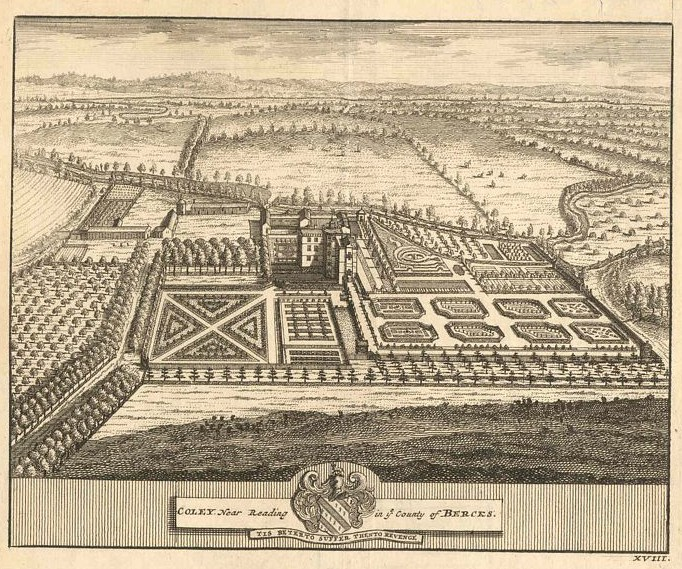
Coley Park c. 1700–1709

A 'Beatrice de Collee' signed a document 'at Collee' in 1298, suggesting a significant house here by this time. This was probably on the Old Lane site of the later Jacobean mansion, since Symonds in his Civil War diary says that the newly built Jacobean mansion was on the site of the 'ancient habitation'. It is probable that the Vachells took over this site, and renewed and embellished it. A new mansion was built by Sir Thomas Vachell in the 1620s, and is the subject of the Kip and Knyff lithograph of the 1690s.

Between 1718 and 1723, the River Kennet, along the southern boundary of the estate, was made navigable under the supervision of the engineer John Hore, as part of the Kennet Navigation from Reading to Newbury. On the Coley Park bank of the river, Fobney Lock was created, along with an artificial lock cut and weir.

By 1727 the estate was heavily indebted, and was sold by William Vachell to Colonel Richard Thompson, who had made his money as a merchant in Jamaica before retiring to the UK in 1711. The property passed to Thompson's daughters, Jane, Frances and Anne, when he died in 1736. The property was divided among the sisters in 1748 on the occasion of Anne's marriage, and Jane was given the House and Park. On the death of Jane, and subsequently her sister Frances in 1791 the House was inherited by Anne who sold it to William Chamberlayne in 1792 (although she retained the Manor of Whitley which had come with the property). Chamberlayne's son, also named William, in turn sold the estate to Thomas Bradford in 1802. Bradford resold the property the same year to John McConnell.

McConnell commissioned a new mansion, Coley House, from the architect Daniel Asher Alexander. This house still stands today, and is often referred to as Coley Mansion House or Coley Park House. The old house was demolished, although its outhouses were retained and used for stabling and later a garage, and housing of the bailiff, head gardener and chauffeur as well as Coley Farmhouse.

In 1810, McConnell sold the estate and house to John Berkeley Monck. In the same year, the Kennet and Avon Canal opened, linking the Kennet Navigation in Newbury to the Avon Navigation in Bath. This put the estate on the side of the principal water route between London and Bristol.

Around 1840, John Bligh Monck made some changes to Coley House, including a new staircase and, probably, adding the third floor that is now to be seen. The Monck family would continue to own the estate until 1937, when it was sold to Harry Keevil, whose father had originally rented the House from George Stanley Monck in 1910.

Between 1882 and 1889, Reading Football Club played their games at Coley, in the grounds of the Park. This was the clubs first enclosed venue, with previous matches being played on open playing fields.

During the First World War two fields in Coley Park were used as an airfield for the Royal Flying Corps' No 1 School of Military Aeronautics and No.1 School of Technical Training, based nearby. However, flying was disrupted by river fogs and by the end of the war the airfield fell into disuse. Amongst the pilots trained at Coley Park was W. E. Johns, who went on to create the Biggles series of aviation-based adventure stories.

After the Second World War, the Ministry of Agriculture occupied Coley House and the garden areas in the northern part of the estate. Two blocks of offices were built for the ministry in these grounds, the more recent in 1968. Coley House subsequently became semi-derelict.

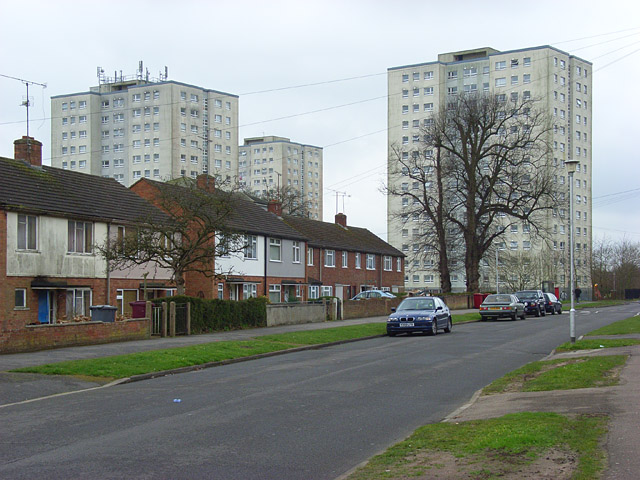
Coley flats, seen from near the Mansion House

In 1956 the then Reading Corporation purchased the southern section of Coley Park estate for a future council housing estate. By 1958 new residents were arriving and by 1960 a set of three high-rise 15-storey flats were under construction. By the end of the 1960s a row of five shops, a pub, a church and a school had been built on the Coley Park estate. New roads built at this stage included Wensley Road and Lesford Road.

In 1993 the Berkshire Independent Hospital run by Ramsay Health Care UK was purpose built on part of the former ministry site adjacent to Coley House. This involved constructing a new access road (known as Swallows Croft) parallel to Wensley Road and between that road and Coley House. Subsequently, Coley House itself underwent major restoration works, including the construction of new buildings to the rear and a complete facelift of the roof areas. Today this Grade II listed building contains consulting rooms and other outpatient facilities for the hospital.

Two new housing developments on the site of Coley House's former gardens followed around 2000. One, at the end of Swallows Croft, replaced the later of the ministry office blocks. The other, accessed by the new Rembrandt Way, was situated to the north of the hospital. The earlier ministry office was refurbished and reroofed for continued use by Department for Environment, Food and Rural Affairs, but this was replaced by a further housing development, being closed in 2011 before being demolished and replaced by 71 new homes.

== Transport ==
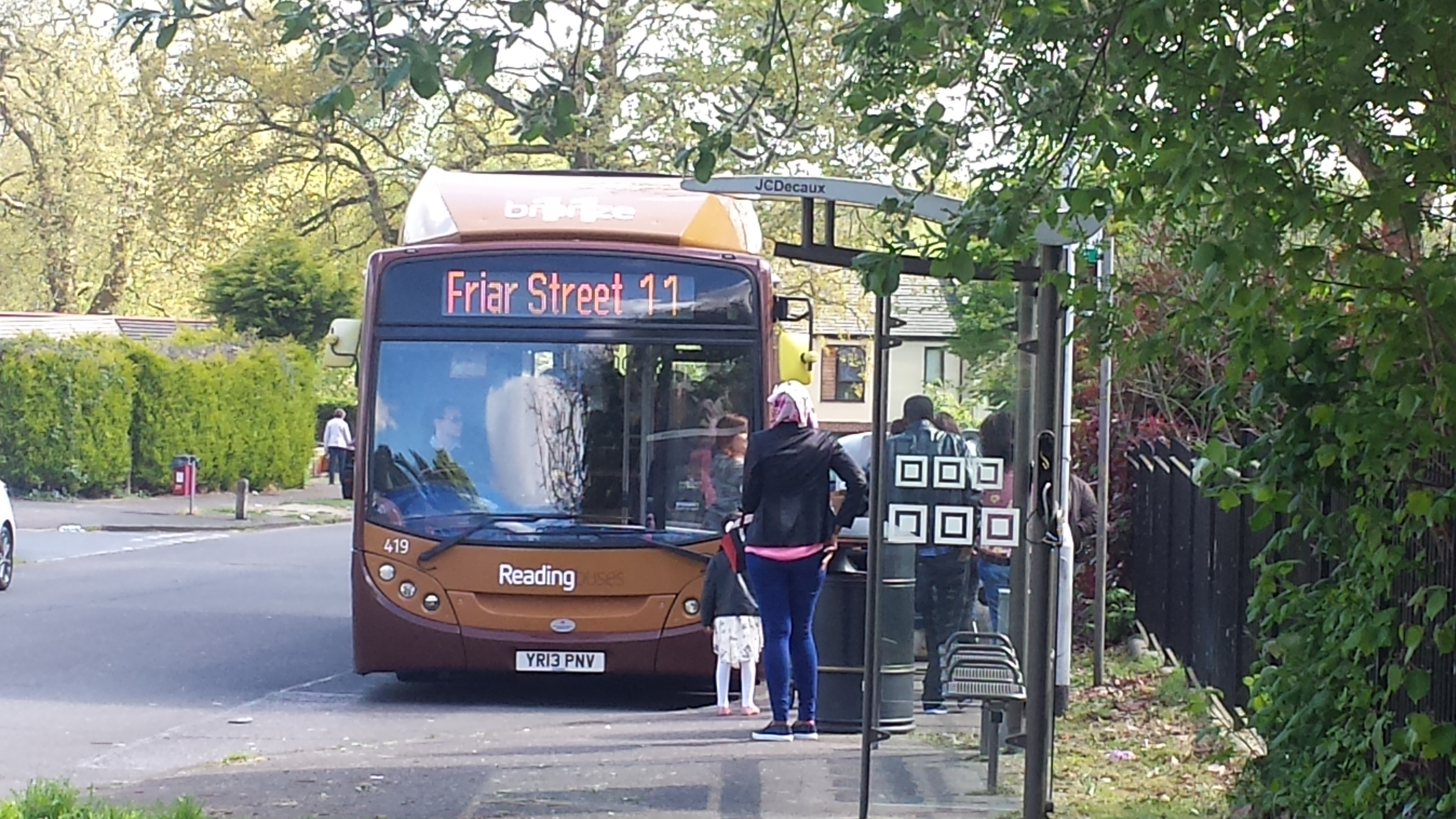
Coley Park bus terminus

Coley Park has limited road access, with only two trafficable streets (Shaw Road and St Saviours Road) connecting the suburb's roads to the adjacent Berkeley Avenue. Historically, the estate was served for three decades by the no. 24 bus which connected directly through to Caversham and Emmer Green on the other side of the river Thames. The route was changed to no. 44 in the 1990s and was renumbered to its present-day nominate when the route began to terminate in the town centre. It is connected to Reading town centre by Reading Buses route 11, which operates every 20 minutes during the day, but less frequently in the evening and on Sundays, and takes about 20 minutes.

Besides the two road accesses, Coley Park has other access routes available only to pedestrians and/or cyclists. The most notable of these is a footpath linking Wensley Road in Coley Park to Southcote Farm Lane in Southcote. This first crosses the defunct Coley branch, before running alongside the existing railway and then passing under both lines at Southcote Junction, where the Reading to Basingstoke line diverges from the Taunton line.
