= Courages Sports Ground =

Sports and cricket ground in Berkshire, England

- Interactive map of Courages Sports Ground

Ground information
- Location: Reading, Berkshire
- Country: England
- Coordinates: 51.4454°N 0.9932°W
- Establishment: c. 1961

Team information
Berkshire	(1975–1986)
- As of 26 July 2010; Source: Ground profile

Courages Sports Ground was a sports and cricket ground in Coley Park suburb of the town of Reading, Berkshire, England. The ground belonged to the Courage Brewery in the town, and was principally provided for the sport and recreation of the brewery staff. It was located south of Berkeley Avenue, which is a part of the A4 road, and was bordered to the west by the Reading to Taunton railway, to the north and east by housing, and to the south by the grounds of Coley House, occupied since the Second World War by the Ministry of Agriculture.

Established prior to 1961, the first cricket match recorded at the ground is in 1964 when Courages Cricket Club played Calmore Sports. Berkshire first played at the ground in the 1975 Minor Counties Championship against Wiltshire. Berkshire played seven further Minor Counties Championship matches at the ground, the last of which came against Wiltshire in 1983. Two MCCA Knockout Trophy matches were played there in 1984 between Berkshire and Buckinghamshire. The first match ended in no result, with the second match won by Berkshire a replay.

A single List A match was played there in the 1986 NatWest Trophy between Berkshire and Gloucestershire. Gloucestershire batted first and made 249/9 from their sixty overs, with Andy Stovold top scoring in the innings with 58, while Peter Lewington's 3/23 were the best bowling figures of the innings. Berkshire were dismissed for 129 to lose the match by 120 runs, with Mark Simmons' 26 the top score in Berkshire's innings, while David Lawrence took figures of 4/36. This was the last time Berkshire played at the ground, with the final recorded match to be played there coming in 1990.

The ground was sold for residential development soon after the last game, with two roads on the new estate named after the cricketers Ken Barrington and Gordon Greenidge. A small southern portion of the ground wasn't built on, and has since been joined with part of the former Ministry of Agriculture site to form a new public park known as Courage Park.

== See also ==
- List of cricket grounds in England and Wales
