= Reading West =

Reading West may refer to:

- Reading West (UK Parliament constituency), a constituency represented in the House of Commons of the Parliament of the United Kingdom
- Reading West railway station, a railway station in West Reading, Berkshire, England

== See also ==
- West Reading (disambiguation)
