= West Reading, Berkshire =

Area of Reading, Berkshire, England

Coordinates: 51.453330°N 0.994870°W

West Reading
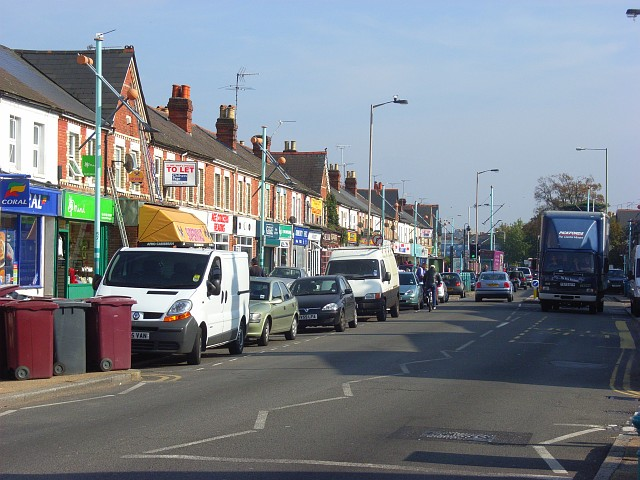
- Oxford Road

- Location within Berkshire
- OS grid reference: SU698732
- Unitary authority: Reading
- Ceremonial county: Berkshire
- Region: South East
- Country: England
- Sovereign state: United Kingdom
- Police: Thames Valley
- Fire: Royal Berkshire
- Ambulance: South Central
- UK Parliament: Reading Central; Reading West and Mid Berkshire

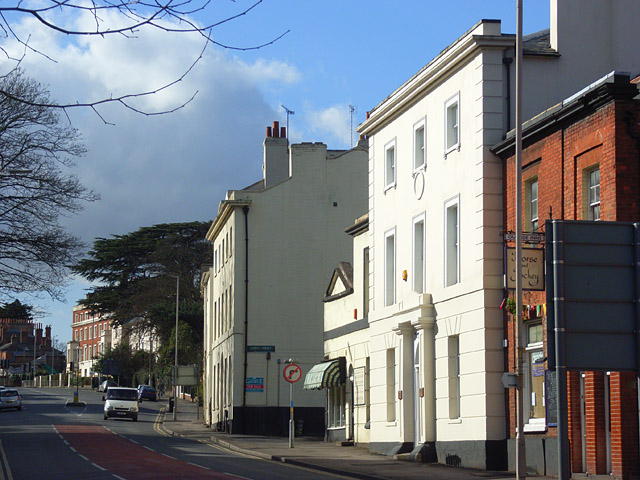
Castle Hill on the southern fringes of West Reading

West Reading is a suburb of the town of Reading in the county of Berkshire, England. It is in the Borough of Reading, and comprises the inhabited part of Battle ward together with parts of Abbey, Coley, Norcot and Southcote wards of that borough. Whilst most of this area is in the Reading Central parliamentary constituency, the Norcot ward portion and a small part of Battle ward is in the Reading West and Mid Berkshire parliamentary constituency.

The locality has no formal boundaries, but the name is generally used to refer to the area to the west of Reading's commercial centre, merging into or to the north of the suburbs of Coley and Southcote, to the east of the suburb of Tilehurst and to the south of the Reading to Bristol railway line. As such it includes the relatively densely populated area along and surrounding the Oxford Road as far as the foot of Norcot Hill, which is a typical example of the British town's rows of terraced houses, as well as the more affluent area between this road and the Bath Road and alongside Tilehurst Road as far as Prospect Park and its slopes.

== History ==
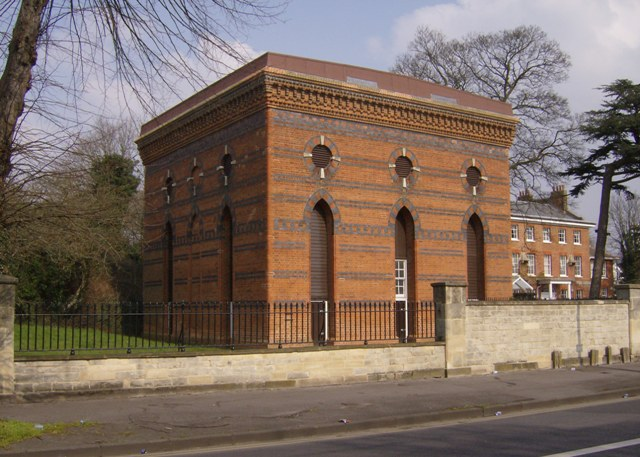
Bath Road Reservoir

The area has a 21st-century supermarket and residential estate on the site of Battle Hospital, once Reading's largest general hospital in site area, adjoining Oxford Road.

The Elm Park stadium in West Reading was home to Reading Football Club from 1896 to 1998 and was redeveloped as a housing estate between 1998 and 2000.

The Bath Road Reservoir, a minor water storage reservoir and ornate brick-built pumping station is an elevated landmark along the Bath Road, built in the late Victorian era. The early 21st-century years saw residents' opposition defeat an attempt by Thames Water to demolish the pumping station, level the reservoir and redevelop the site for housing.

== Transport ==
West Reading is served by Reading West railway station on the local lines between Reading/Basingstoke and Reading/Newbury. Reading Buses operates frequent services along the Oxford Road, Bath Road and Tilehurst Road corridors.

== Amenities and events ==
The district contains the Church of England parish churches of All Saints, Holy Trinity, St. Mark and Tylehurst St George, together with English Martyrs Church in the Catholic church.

The Reading Half Marathon runs through the streets of West Reading every year and into the town centre.
