= Southcote Junction =

Railway junction in Reading, United Kingdom

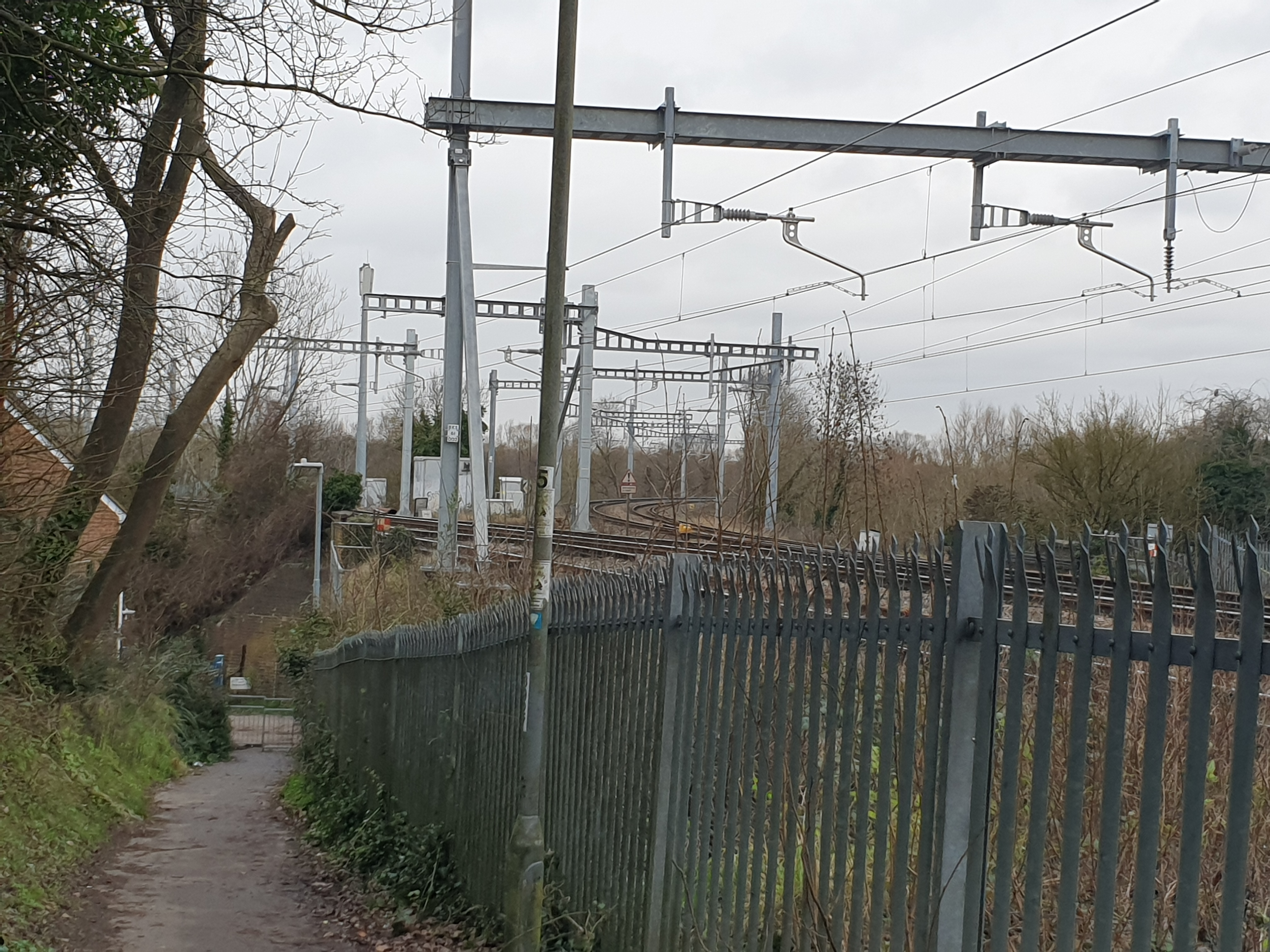
- View from Coley Park to Southcote footpath showing lines to Basingstoke (left) and Taunton (right), taken in 2021
- Interactive map of Southcote Junction
- Coordinates: 51.441517°N 0.997481°W
- Country: England
- Town: Reading

Southcote Junction is a railway junction in the English town of Reading. It is the point where the Reading to Basingstoke line diverges from the Reading to Taunton line, and is situated between the Reading suburbs of Southcote and Coley Park and some 2 kilometres (1.2 mi) to the south of Reading West station. A second adjacent junction, the Coley Branch Junction, formerly existed a few metres to the north where the Coley branch line diverged.

The railway line from Reading to Hungerford (which would eventually become the Taunton line) opened on 21 December 1847, whilst the Basingstoke line opened on 1 November 1848. Both lines were proposed as part of the Berks and Hants Railway, but that company became part of the Great Western Railway before the track was laid. From 1908 until 1983, the Coley branch line diverged at Coley Branch Junction.

Until 26 April 1965, the junction was controlled by Southcote Junction Signal Box, situated to the east of the line just north of the junction. A new signal box was opened here in 1896, to replace an earlier box, and it was upgraded in 1908 to cater for the new Coley branch. After closure the box was demolished, and control transferred to Reading Signal Box. There was a refuge siding adjacent to the junction, parallel to the up line; this was taken out of use in 1963. Before closure in 1965, Southcote Junction signal box had 25 levers.

The junction is readily visible from a footpath linking Wensley Road in Coley Park to Southcote Farm Lane in Southcote. This first crosses the trackbed of the old Coley branch, before running alongside the railway and then passing under both lines at the junction.

Southcote Junction and the line between it and the junctions with the Great Western Main Line are heavily trafficked with a mixture of local passenger, long distance passenger and freight trains on both lines. In 2015, Network Rail’s Western Route Study suggested the provision of a grade separated junction at Southcote, with a third track to be provided between there and the Oxford Road Junction at Reading West.

The overhead electrification of the Reading to Taunton line as far as Newbury was completed by February 2019, but Southcote Junction is currently the limit of electrification on the line to Basingstoke, so all trains on that line are diesel powered.
