= Courage Park, Reading =

Public park in Reading, England

Courage Park
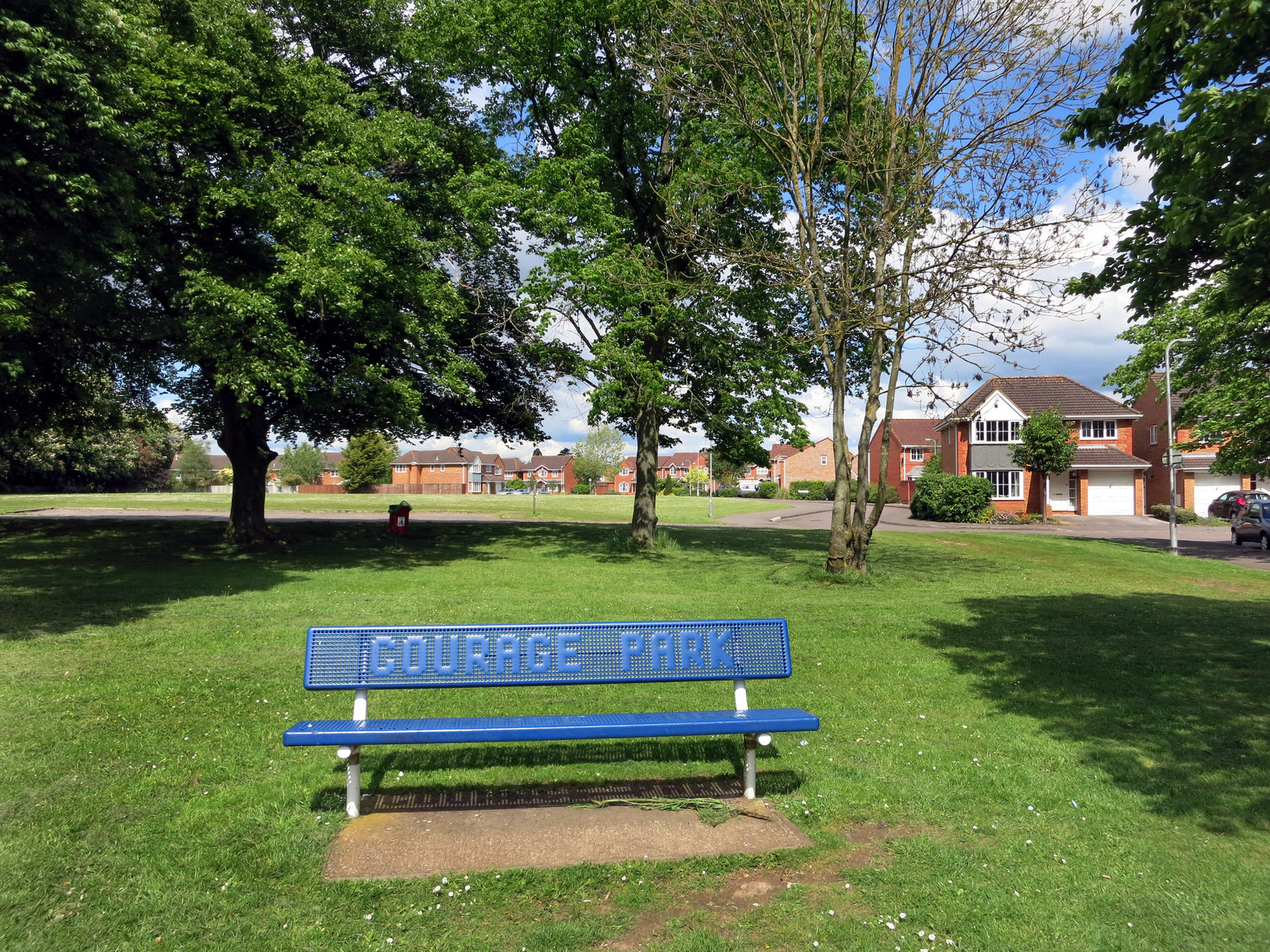
- The park, with appropriate seating

- Location within Reading, Berkshire
- Interactive map of Courage Park
- Type: Public park
- Location: Coley Park, Reading, UK
- Coordinates: 51°26′40″N 0°59′40″W

Courage Park is a public park in the Coley Park suburb of the town of Reading in the English county of Berkshire. The park includes amenity grassland, together with a wooded area to the south of the site. Within the park there is a brick-built pavilion with changing rooms and storage space, a basketball court, and a children's play area. This principal access to the park is from Edenham Crescent, a residential street, and the park was previously known as Edenham Crescent Park. Other pedestrian accesses are available from Wensley Road, Swallows Croft and Coley Avenue.

== History ==
The grassland area of the park was formerly part of the Courages Sports Ground, a sports ground belonging to the Courage Brewery in the town. This ground was principally provided for the sport and recreation of the brewery staff, but was also used on occasion by Berkshire County Cricket Club. After the brewery was acquired by the Hanson Trust in 1986, and then sold to Elders IXL in 1990, Hanson separately sold the sports ground site for housing development. As part of that development, part of the sports ground was retained for public use, initially known as Edenham Crescent Park.

The southern woodland area of the park has a different provenance, having formed the western end of the Ministry of Agriculture site that had occupied the grounds of Coley House since the Second World War. This was separated from the Courage Sports Ground by a fenced public footpath. After the ministry site was redeveloped at the beginning of the 21st century, the woodland became isolated and derelict, whilst the remains of the sports ground became run-down and subject to anti-social behaviour. A project was formed by Reading Borough Council and the Thames Valley Partnership, working with a community steering group of local residents and the Prison Service, to address this.

The renovation of the park was undertaken by prisoners from Reading Prison, which at that time was a Young Offenders Institution. At the same time they cleared the undergrowth from the wooded areas, and removed the fences that separated it from the public footpath and open space, thus creating a single park. Prison and probation officers reported that the project provided the offenders with skills and contacts useful for their resettlement, and the project attracted widespread attention, including the site visit of a delegation from Russia. As a result of a suggestion by a local resident, the enlarged park was formally renamed Courage Park in recognition of its previous ownership and the fact the project ‘took courage’ to realise.

== See also ==
- List of parks and open spaces in Reading, Berkshire
