= Reading West railway station =

Railway station in the English town of Reading

Coordinates: 51.455142°N 0.990516°W

Reading West
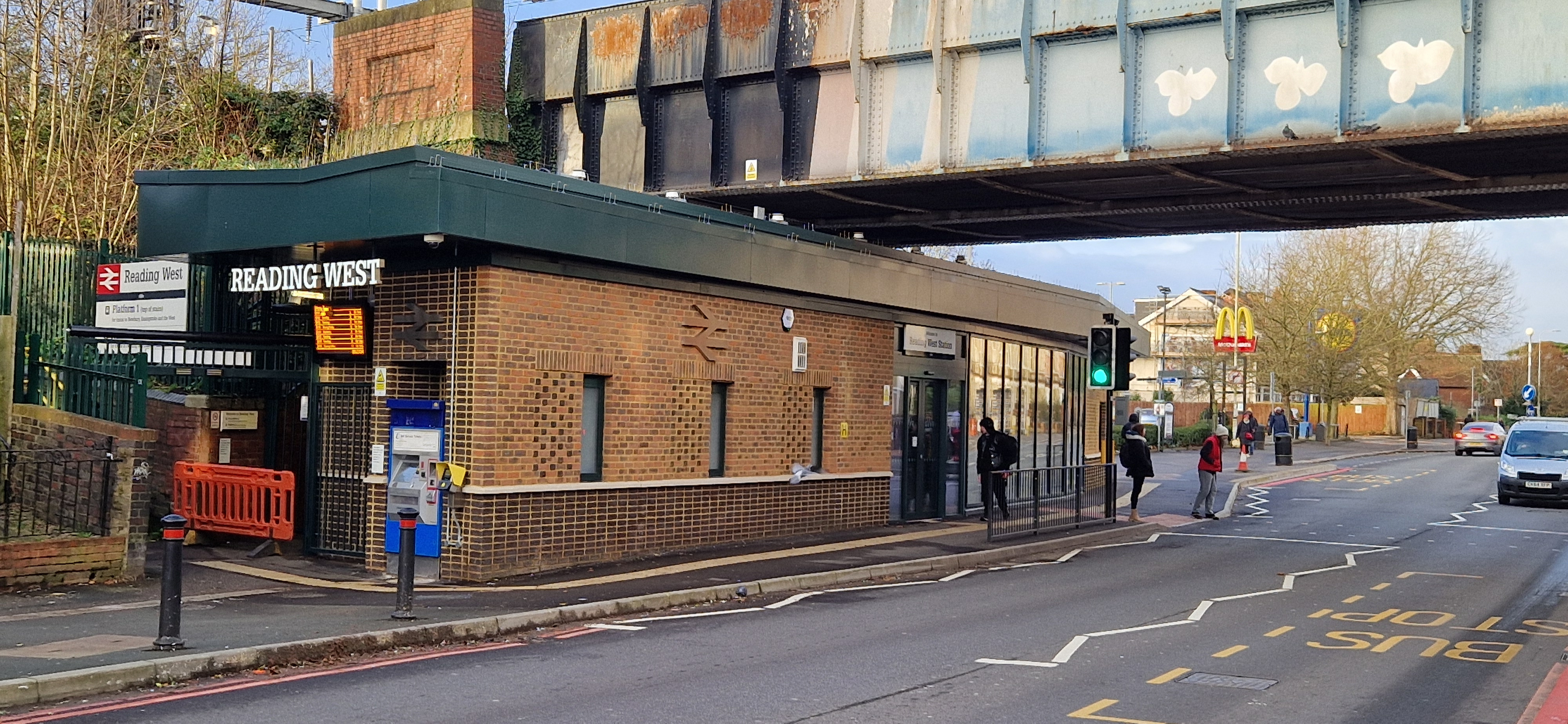
- New station building, January 2024

General information
- Location: Reading, Borough of Reading; England
- Grid reference: SU702733
- Manager: Great Western Railway
- Platforms: 2

Other information
- Station code: RDW
- Classification: DfT category E

History
- Opened: 1 July 1906
- Original company: Great Western Railway
- Pre-grouping: GWR
- Post-grouping: GWR

Passengers
- 2020/21: ▼0.134 million
- Interchange: ▼3,165
- 2021/22: ▲0.281 million
- Interchange: ▲9,382
- 2022/23: ▲0.290 million
- Interchange: ▲13,464
- 2023/24: ▲0.336 million
- Interchange: ▼12,934
- 2024/25: ▲0.482 million
- Interchange: ▲15,434
Location
- Location within Reading, Berkshire
Notes
- Passenger statistics from the Office of Rail and Road

Reading West railway station serves West Reading, Berkshire, about 1 mile (1.6 km) west from the town's main retail and commercial areas. The station is served by local services operated by Great Western Railway. It is 36 miles 75 chains (36.94 mi; 59.4 km) down the line from the zero point at London Paddington.

== History ==
=== Construction and opening ===
The line through Reading West station opened on 21 December 1847, as part of the Great Western Railway-backed Berks and Hants Railway's route from Reading to Newbury. No station was originally provided.

On 1 November 1848, the Berks and Hants Railway's second route to Basingstoke opened. The two lines merged at Southcote Junction, some 2 kilometres (1.2 mi) to the south of the eventual station site, running together through that site to Reading station.

Reading West station itself did not open until 1 July 1906, by which time the Berks and Hants Railway had been subsumed into the Great Western Railway. The station was originally intended to serve trains between the north of England and the south coast which could thus avoid a reversal at Reading.

=== Derailment in 1965 ===
On 28 December 1965, the 08:30 passenger service from Reading General to Penzance derailed near the station. The 10-coach train was travelling at 15 miles per hour (24 km/h) when it struck a broken rail, derailing at the fifth carriage (with the wheels of the following coaches also derailing). The train stayed upright, and the application of the locomotive's vacuum brakes saw the train stop in approximately 110 yards (100 m). An investigation found that the rail had suffered a transverse fracture at the site of wheelburns. None of the passengers sustained serious injury.

=== Rebuilding ===
In 2015, Network Rail's Western Route Study suggested the provision of a grade separated junction at Southcote to the south of the station, with a third track to be provided between there and the junction with the Great Western main line to the north of the station. This plan, which would have required a radical rebuild of Reading West, was not proceeded with.

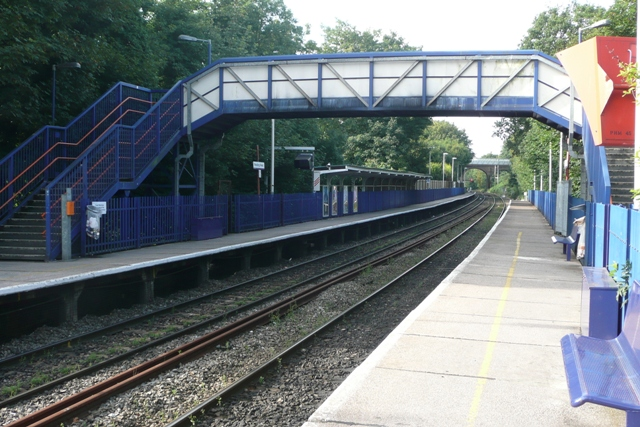
The former pedestrian footbridge

In 2019, electrification of the Reading to Taunton line was completed as far as Newbury, including the section though Reading West station. As part of these works, the pedestrian bridge that had previously connected the platforms was removed. To switch platforms passengers must now leave the station and cross underneath the railway bridge on the Oxford Road.

In 2021, work began on a new station building on Oxford Road, as well as a new entrance from Tilehurst Road, and a new bus interchange. At the time, the expectation was that the station would open in the summer of 2022. The rebuilt station was opened in March 2024.

== Location ==
To the north of the station the line crosses a railway bridge over the Oxford Road, followed by Oxford Road Junction, which is the southern apex of a triangle of tracks. The tracks to the west curve round to join the Great Western Main Line towards Bristol at Reading West Junction, and are largely used by freight trains between Southampton Docks and points to the north. The tracks to the east lead to Reading station and are mostly used by passenger services.

To the south of the station the line enters a cutting, crossed by high level bridges carrying the Tilehurst Road and, further to the south, the Bath Road. Beyond the cutting is Southcote Junction, where the line to Basingstoke diverges from that to Newbury, and where the Coley branch line formerly diverged.

There is separate pedestrian access to the northern end of both platforms from Oxford Road, together with access to the southern end of the down platform from Tilehurst Road. There is no access between the up platform and the Tilehurst Road, other than via that platform's Oxford Road access.

== Services ==
The station is served by local services operated by Great Western Railway between Reading and Basingstoke or Newbury. During weekdays the station is served by two trains an hour on the Basingstoke route, plus one on the Newbury route. In the morning peak there are also a few through trains to Paddington. Trains are less frequent on Sundays. Trains typically take 3 minutes to reach Reading, 24 minutes to reach Basingstoke, 25 minutes to reach Newbury and just over 35 minutes to reach London.

Preceding station	National Rail	Following station
Reading	Great Western Railway; Reading to Taunton line	Theale
Reading	Great Western Railway; Reading to Basingstoke Line	Reading Green Park
