= Church of St Mark, Reading =

St Mark, Reading
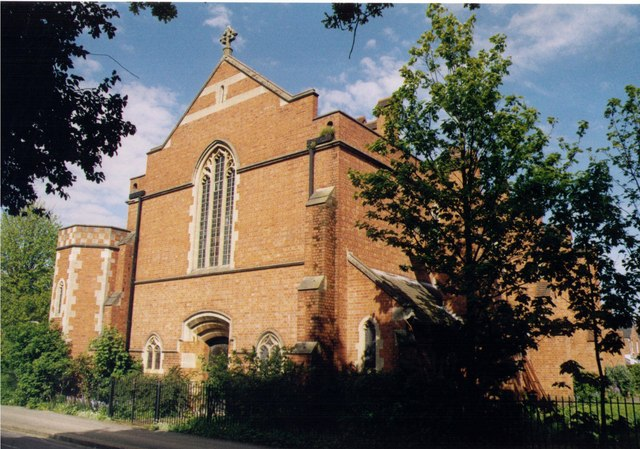
- St Mark, Reading
- 51.4544°N 0.9984°W
- Location: Reading, Berkshire
- Country: England
- Denomination: Church of England
- Tradition: Anglo-Catholic

Architecture
- Heritage designation: Grade II
- Designated: 2007
- Architect: Montague Wheeler
- Architectural type: Parish church
- Style: Arts and Crafts, Gothic
- Groundbreaking: 1905
- Completed: 1906

Specifications
- Materials: Red brick, slate, tile, stone

Administration
- Diocese: Diocese of Oxford
- Parish: St. Mark and All Saints

The Church of St Mark, Reading, is an Anglican church in Cranbury Road, Reading, Berkshire. It is part of the parish of St. Mark and All Saints, Reading, which includes All Saints' Church.

== Architecture ==
The present building dates from 1904 to 1905, although the church was founded 15 years previously as a mission. Designed by Reading-based Scottish architect Montague Wheeler, the building is primarily Arts and Crafts but has Gothic references. The brickwork is red brick English bond with some stone and tile dressings, and the roof is slated. The stained glass windows on the western wall were made by Joseph Nuttgens and Reginald Hallward. The eastern face features a larger 1905–6 window by Charles Eamer Kempe. A number of flying buttresses support the building. On the north-west corner is an octagonal stair tower.

== Organ ==
The church organ was installed by William Hill & Sons in 1912. Its loft is located at the west end of the building, and is painted and panelled.
