= Coley branch line =

Goods branch line and terminal depot in Reading, England

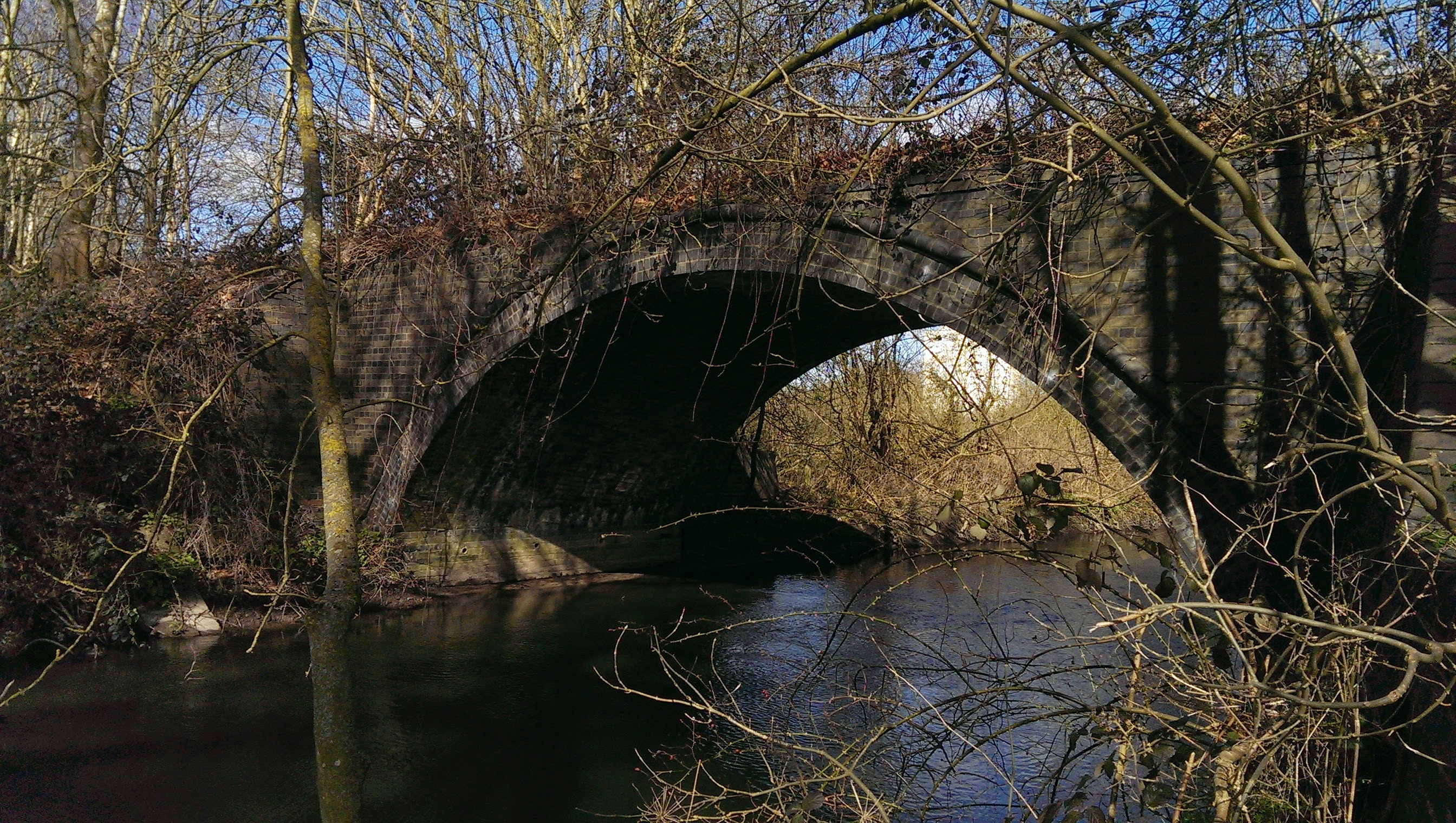
- Bridge carrying the line over the Holy Brook

Overview
- Status: Dismantled
- Line number: COY
- Locale: South East England
- Termini: Coley Branch Junction; Reading Central Goods

Service
- Type: Heavy rail
- System: Great Western Railway
- Operator(s): Great Western Railway (1908–1949); British Railways (1949–1983)

History
- Opened: 1908
- Closed: 1983

Technical
- Line length: 1 mile 61 chains (1.76 miles, 2.84 km)
- Number of tracks: 1
- Track gauge: 4 ft 8 1/2 in (1,435 mm) standard gauge
- Operating speed: 30 mph (48 km/h)

The Coley branch line (ELR:COY), also known as the Coley goods branch, was a single-track branch railway running 1 mile 61 chains (1.76 miles, 2.84 km) to Reading Central goods depot, from the Reading to Basingstoke line near Southcote Junction.

== History ==
The railway was built by the Great Western Railway and was authorised for construction by the Great Western Railway (Additional Powers) Act 1905, as a means to reduce goods traffic on the main line, and to reduce cartage by providing a goods facility on the opposite side of the town centre to the main railway station. The depot was built by Henry Lovatt of Wolverhampton and was partly on the site of a Masonic Temple. The line and depot opened in 1908.

The line never had a regular passenger service, although occasional railway enthusiast's specials reached the line. After a reduction in demand, the line and depot closed in July 1983. Since the line's closure, part of the route of the line at the goods depot end has been reused by the A33 road, whilst the rest has become a de facto walking route although not an official public right of way.

== Route ==
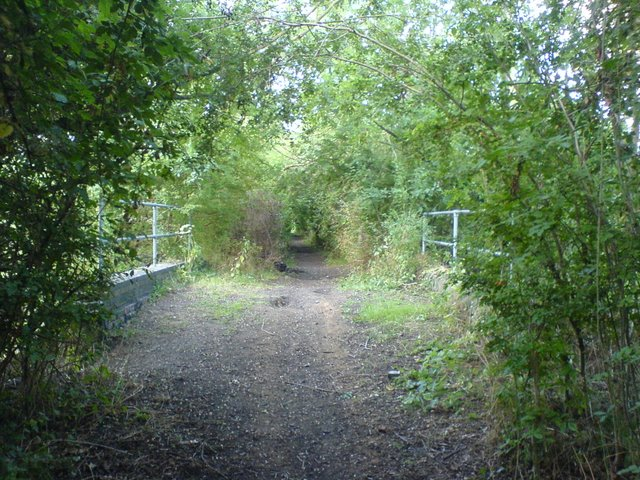
The walking route that now occupies much of the trackbed.

After diverging south-eastwards from the Reading to Basingstoke Line at Coley Branch Junction, which was adjacent to Southcote Junction, the track was crossed by a brick and iron footbridge that formed a pedestrian link between the Reading suburbs of Coley Park and Southcote. Since the line has been closed, the bridge has been demolished and replaced by a ramp and footpath across the trackbed of the branch, which also gives access to the walking route along the trackbed.

The line then entered a cutting. Emerging from the cutting, the line traversed an embankment which raised it from the surrounding Kennet flood plains. A skew arch bridge took the line over the Holy Brook, after which a semaphore signal 618 yards (565 m) from the junction was situated. A number of ditches and channels were culverted under the embankment, which reduced in height as the line entered Reading.

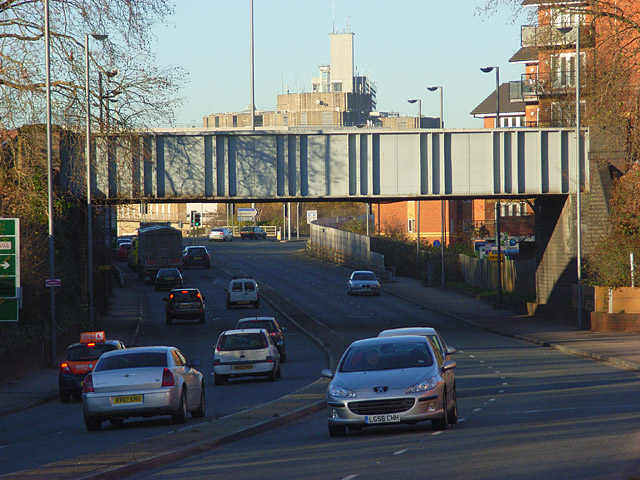
The bridge which once carried Berkeley Avenue over the throat of the goods yard.

At about 1.2 miles (1.9 km) from the junction, the line reached its first lineside industry, a jam factory belonging to the Co-operative Society that was served by sidings. At the same point today, the walking route along the trackbed finishes, and the trackbed disappears under the busy dual carriageway road that is the A33. After serving a sawmill, the line passed under Berkeley Avenue. The road is carried on a typical iron railway bridge that still exists, but today carries Berkeley Avenue over the A33. Just before the bridge, the line started to spread out into a number of sidings, which after the bridge became Reading Central Goods depot

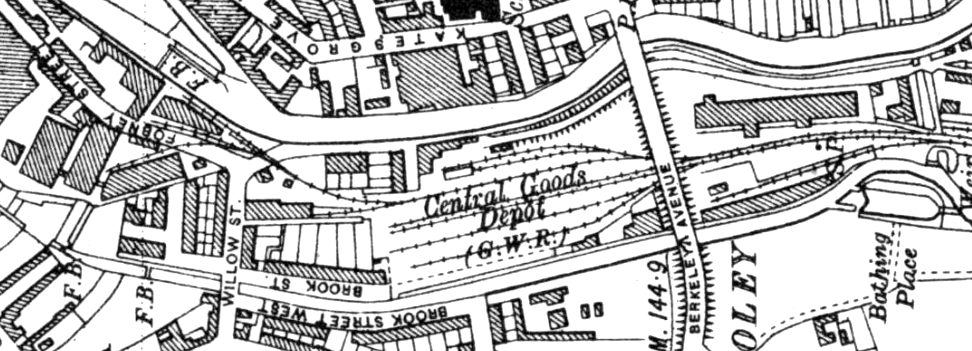
Reading Central Goods from 1913 Ordnance Survey six-inch to mile map (north to left)

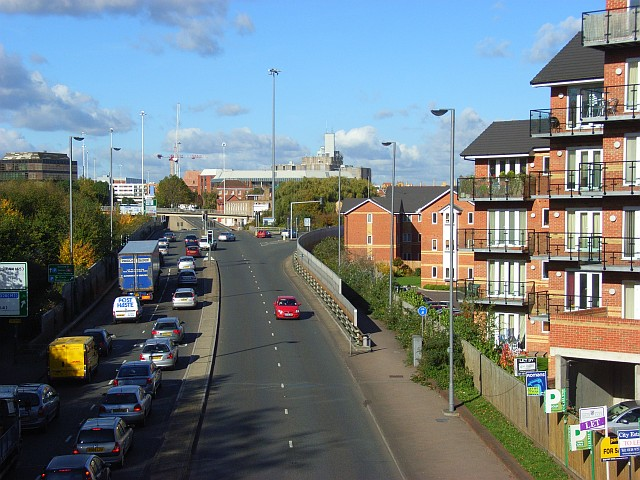
The site of the goods yard today.

Located between the River Kennet and the Holy Brook, the depot yard had 12 sidings—located in six pairs—with accommodation for approximately 300 wagons carrying goods such as coal, timber, brick, stone, hay, straw and fertiliser. The yard served local businesses such as the Anglo-American Oil, Gascoignes (manufacturers of dairy machinery and inventors of the Kee Klamp), Baynes's timber yard and several coal merchants. The yard closed with the rest of the line in 1983, and most of the space it occupied is now occupied by the A33 road and its junction with the town's Inner Distribution Road, together with an apartment block.

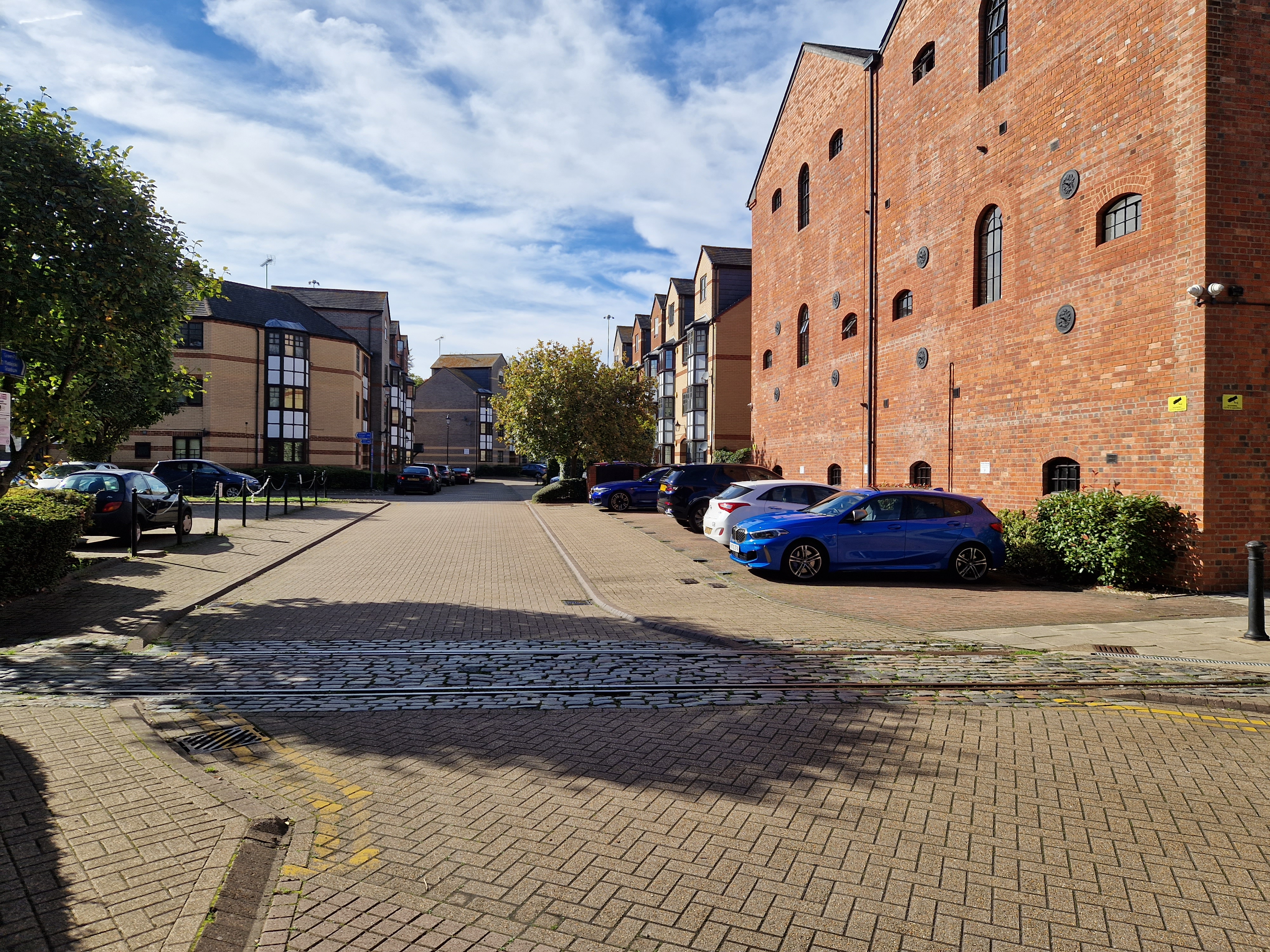
Crossing on siding into brewery.

Originally one siding continued north-east to Simonds Brewery crossing Fobney Street on the level; this crossing still exists. At Bear Wharf, adjacent to County Lock on the Kennet, another siding was built to allow trans-shipment of goods between rail and barge, with locomotives sometimes being used to tow vessels short distances against the current. With the decline of the river's use for goods transport the wharf closed in 1969, whilst the brewery siding was severed by the building of the Inner Distribution Road, opened the same year. Today the brewery and wharf sites are occupied by housing.
