= All Saints' Church, Reading =

All Saints' Church
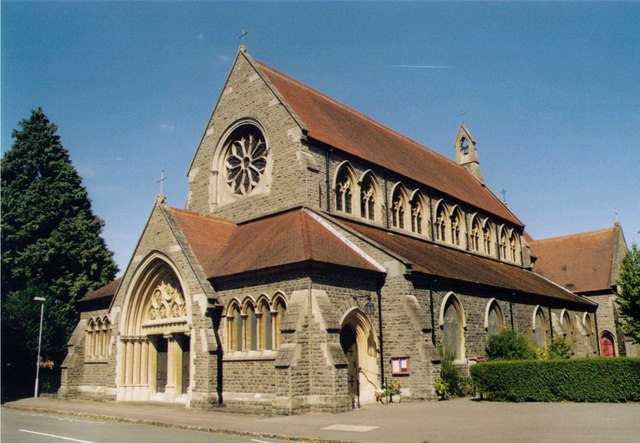
- The frontage of the church

- Location within Reading
- 51°27′5.04″N 0°59′17.83″W
- Location: Reading
- Country: England
- Denomination: Church of England
- Website: http://www.achurchnearyou.com/reading-all-saints/

History
- Founded: 1865
- Dedication: All Saints
- Consecrated: 1865

Architecture
- Functional status: Active
- Heritage designation: Grade II
- Architect: James Piers St Aubyn
- Style: Gothic
- Completed: 1874

Administration
- Diocese: Oxford
- Archdeaconry: Berkshire

All Saints' Church is a Church of England parish church in the town of Reading in the English county of Berkshire. The church is on Downshire Square, a tree-lined square in West Reading close to the Bath Road. It is part of the parish of St. Mark and All Saints, which includes St. Mark's Church.

The church was built between 1865 and 1874, as a daughter church of the Minster Church of St Mary, to serve the growing population of the Bath Road area. It was designed by the architect James Piers St Aubyn. The construction is of coursed rubble with ashlar dressings and weathered buttresses. The roof is tiled, and the church has a five bay aisled nave with a short transept. The interior includes a painted arcade, a rich five-window apse, and mural mosaics, the finest of which is a glass mosaic reredos depicting the last supper. This came from the London workshop of the renowned glass artist Antonio Salviati and was installed in 1866. The foundations for a tower to the south side of the church were constructed, but the tower itself was never completed.

The music for the church was originally provided by a small four-stop organ lent to the church by a "Father Willis", which was positioned in the original North transept. The organ was extensively enhanced to include a triple keyboard and additional pipes between 1874 and 1883, and has remained in more or less the same form until the present day.

There is a current project appeal for the upgrading of the church to modern accessibility standards. This project hopes to add toilet facilities and improve disabled access to the building whilst retaining the church's unique character and architectural features.

The church is categorised as a Grade II listed building by English Heritage.
