= Reading–Basingstoke line =

Railway line in England, linking Reading and Basingstoke

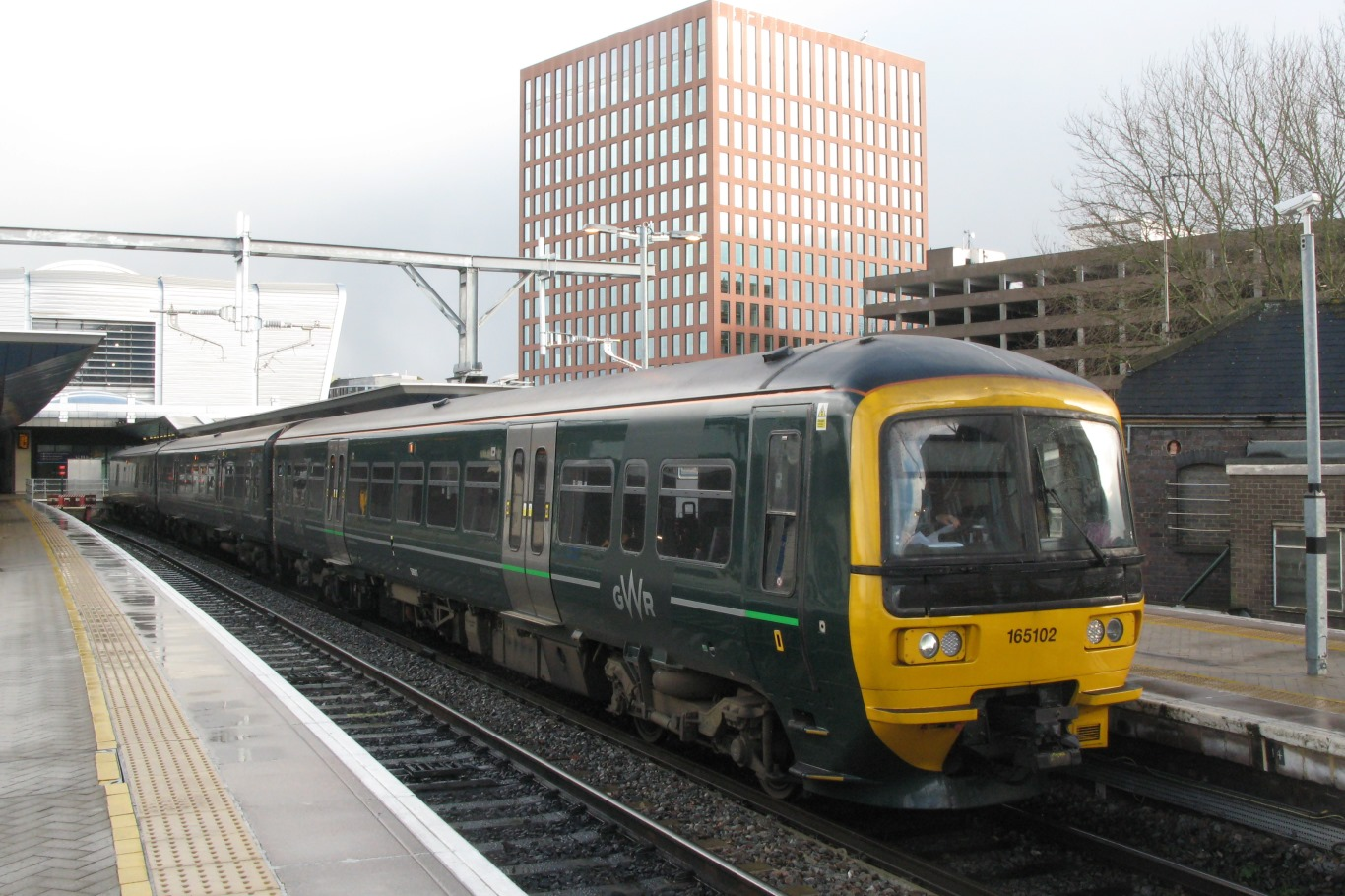
- A GWR Class 165 at Reading in 2017 with a service to Basingstoke

Overview
- Status: Operational
- Owner: Network Rail
- Locale: South East England
- Termini: Reading; Basingstoke
- Stations: 6

Service
- Type: Heavy rail
- System: National Rail
- Operator(s): CrossCountry; Great Western Railway; South Western Railway; DB Cargo; Freightliner
- Rolling stock: Class 66; Class 165; Class 166; Class 220 Voyager; Class 221 Super Voyager; Class 158

History
- Opened: 1848; 177 years ago

Technical
- Line length: 15mi 20ch (24.54 km)
- Number of tracks: 2
- Track gauge: 1,435 mm (4 ft 8 1/2 in) standard gauge
Route map
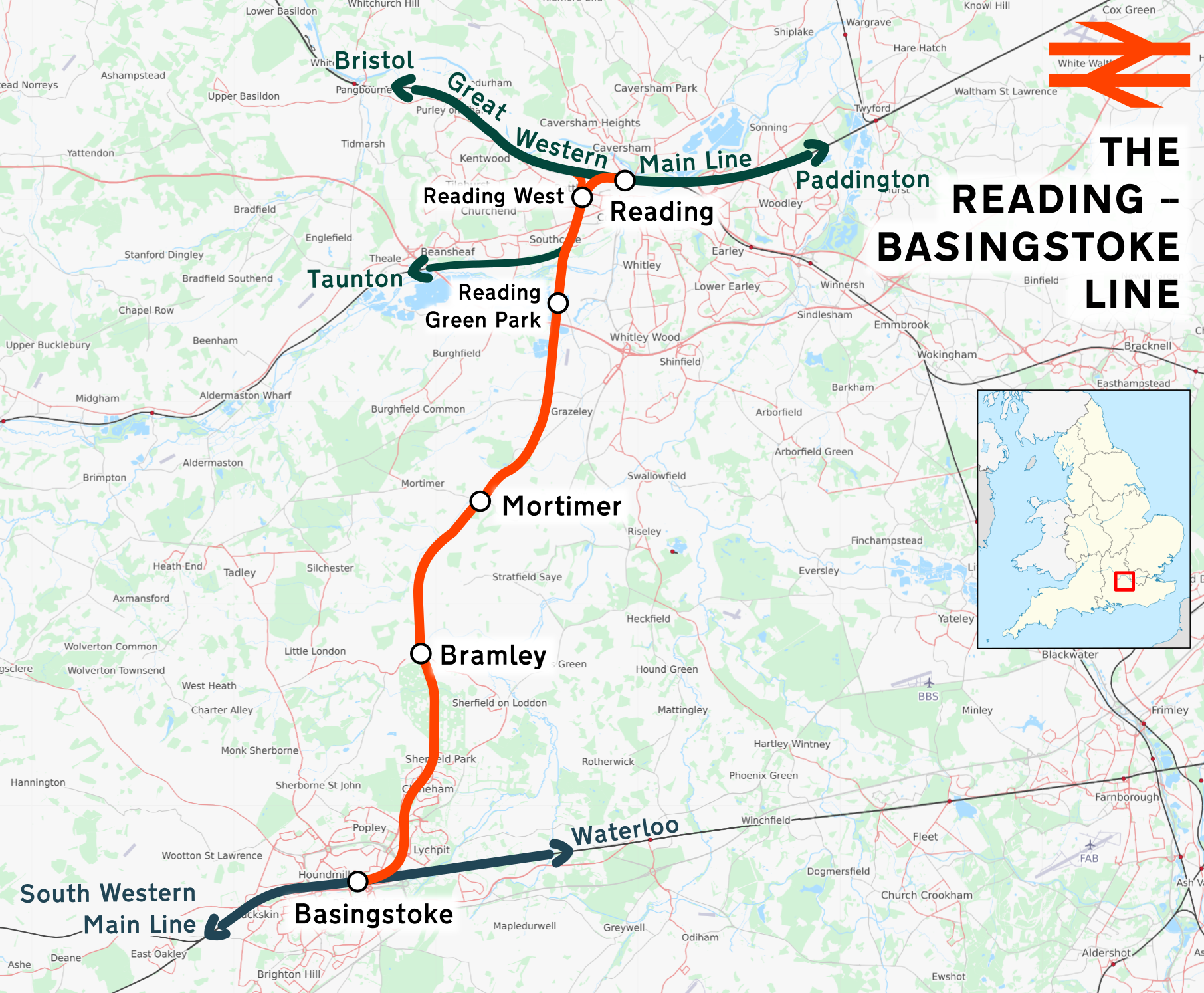
(Click to expand)

The Reading–Basingstoke line is a railway link between the South West Main Line and the Great Western Main Line, constructed by the Great Western Railway between 1846 and 1848. The line is served by GWR local services between Reading and Basingstoke, stopping at the intermediate stations of Reading West, Reading Green Park, Mortimer and Bramley. The line is also an important through route for longer distance passenger and freight services: CrossCountry services from Bournemouth and Southampton to Birmingham and the North of England and freight trains between the Port of Southampton and the Midlands use the line. South Western Railway weekend workings also operate between Reading and Salisbury.

The northern part of the line, including Reading West station, is shared with the Reading–Taunton line, which branches off to the west at Southcote Junction in the Reading suburbs. To the north of Reading West, the line joins the Great Western Main Line with curves facing both east and west. The main line here comprises two pairs of tracks, with the main lines to the south and the relief lines to the north, and a complex of grade separated junctions allows access to the relief lines (both east and westbound) and to both sides of the main lines (eastbound) without needing to cross the main line on the level. The line is double track throughout, with line speed limited to 75 miles per hour (121 km/h). There is a level crossing at Bramley railway station, with all other road crossing carried by under or over bridges.

== History ==
A railway was originally proposed in 1843 as a link between Basingstoke, Newbury and Didcot by the London and South Western Railway. A new company, the Berks and Hants Railway had the idea of building the link between Basingstoke and Reading. The Berks and Hants Railway joined the Great Western Railway before the track was laid.

The railway was built by the GWR, with the engineer Isambard Kingdom Brunel, who used broad gauge, from Reading's railway station to Basingstoke. Since the main line at Basingstoke used standard gauge, it was impractical for the railways to share the same station, and the GWR built a station to the north of the L&SWR's station. The line had a single intermediate station at Mortimer.

In 1846, prior to the line being built, the Gauge Commissioners (Regulation of Gauge Act) recommended to Parliament that the line from Reading to Basingstoke should be built to standard gauge. In 1854 the Great Western was ordered to convert the railway to standard gauge between Reading and Basingstoke by 7 February 1856, or face a fine of £200 each day. However, it was not until 22 December 1856 that a mixed gauge track was opened. Basingstoke kept its separate Great Western station until 1 January 1932 when trains were diverted into the L&SWR station with addition of one platform, still in use today, from the old station.

In 1895, a railway station was opened at Bramley, then in 1917, a depot was opened at Bramley Ordnance Depot, which had a complex network of sidings. The depot was used to manufacture and store ammunition, and lasted until 1987. Another station was opened in 1906 at Reading West, which allowed long-distance trains to call at Reading without the need to reverse at Reading's main station. Some use was made of this facility. This became less of an issue when diesel multiple unit trains were introduced, which could easily reverse at Reading General.

The section of line between Southcote Junction and Basingstoke was resignalled in 2006, to increase the capacity of the line.

In July 2007, plans were agreed to build a station in Reading south of Southcote Junction in the Green Park business park, also serving the southern suburbs of Reading and the Madejski Stadium. Construction of Reading Green Park railway station was expected to be completed in 2010 but by 2011 work had not started and the plans were suspended. The plans were reinstated in 2013 and after several further delays, construction eventually got under way in 2019, just in time to be further delayed by the coronavirus pandemic. In October 2020 it was reported to be due to open in the late summer of 2021 "at the earliest". In June 2021 Network Rail announced that the opening had been put back until April to June 2022. It eventually opened on 27 May 2023.

== Services ==
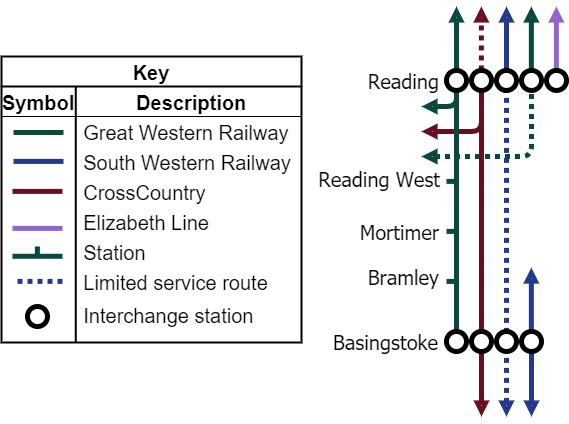
A map of the Reading-Basingstoke Line showing train operating companies serving it

The route sees two stopping services in either direction every hour which are operated by Great Western Railway using Class 165 or Class 166 trains, replacing two Class 150 units. A further train in each direction every hour, half-hourly at times, is operated by CrossCountry but this does not call at stations between Reading and Basingstoke. South West Trains previously ran services to Brighton on this route. As of 19 May 2019, South Western Railway run Sunday services, scheduled hourly between 08:00 and 18:00. This service originates from Salisbury, stopping at all intermediate stations until Basingstoke before running express to Reading along the Reading-Basingstoke line, not stopping at any intermediate stations.

== Future ==
The railway is listed with Network Rail as part of route 13, the Great Western Main Line, and was due to be electrified with 25 kV overhead wiring by 2017 as part of the modernisation of the main line. However this has been delayed until Control Period 6 (2019-2024).

Plans have been discussed over the years for a further new station to the north of Basingstoke, serving the Basingstoke suburb of Chineham. However doubts have been cast on the capacity of the line to support a further station after the opening of Green Park. The line between Southcote Junction and the Great Western Main Line is heavily trafficked and, in 2015, Network Rail’s Western Route Study suggested the provision of a grade separated junction at Southcote, with a third track to be provided between there and the Oxford Road Junction at Reading West.

== Gallery ==
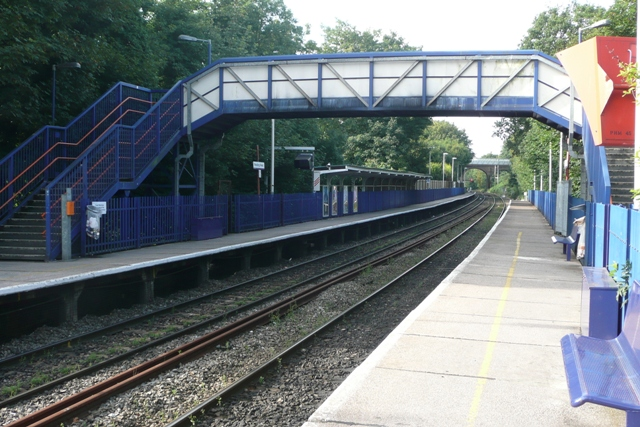
Reading West, looking towards Basingstoke (showing former footbridge, removed 2019)

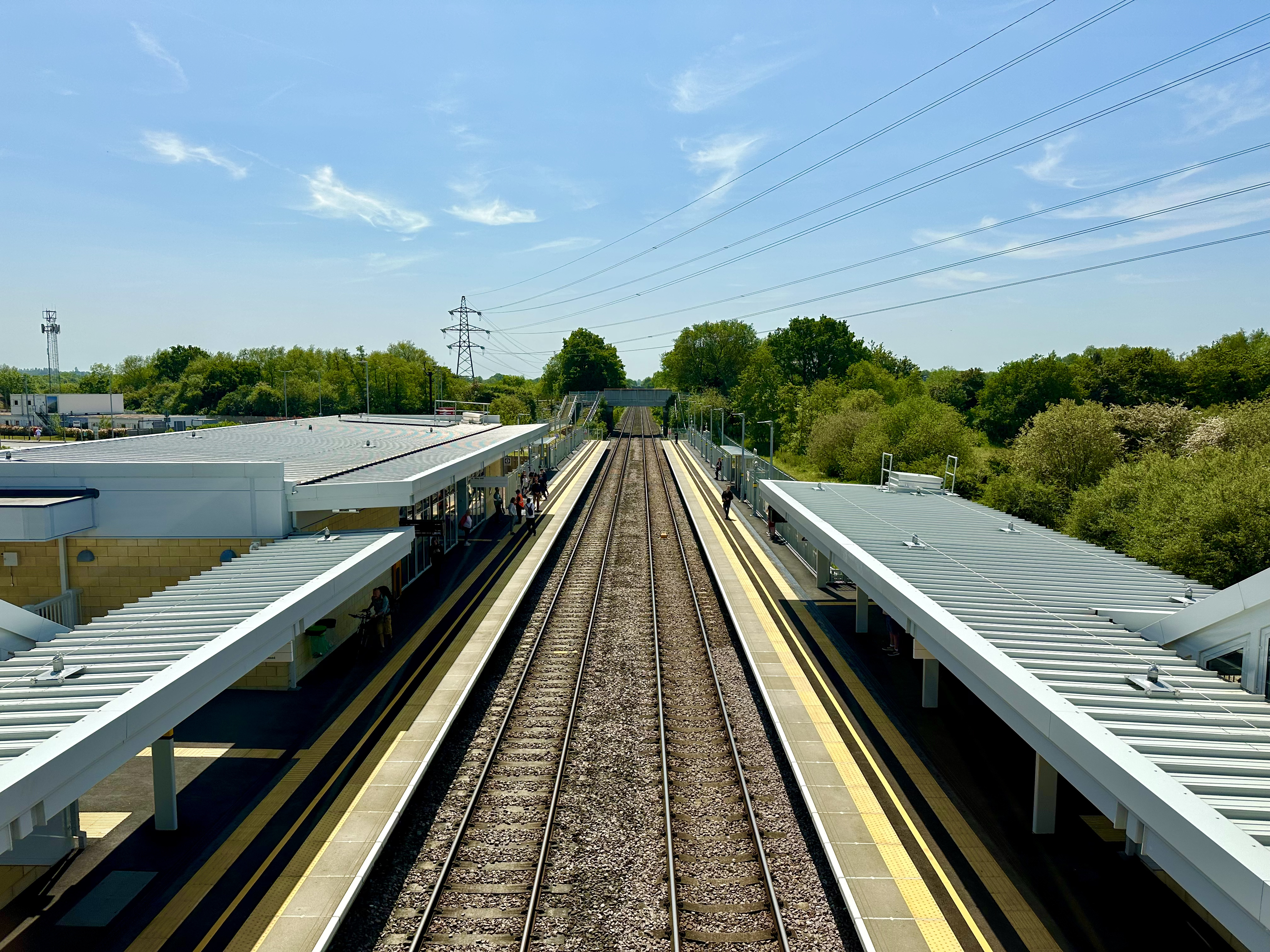
Reading Green Park looking south

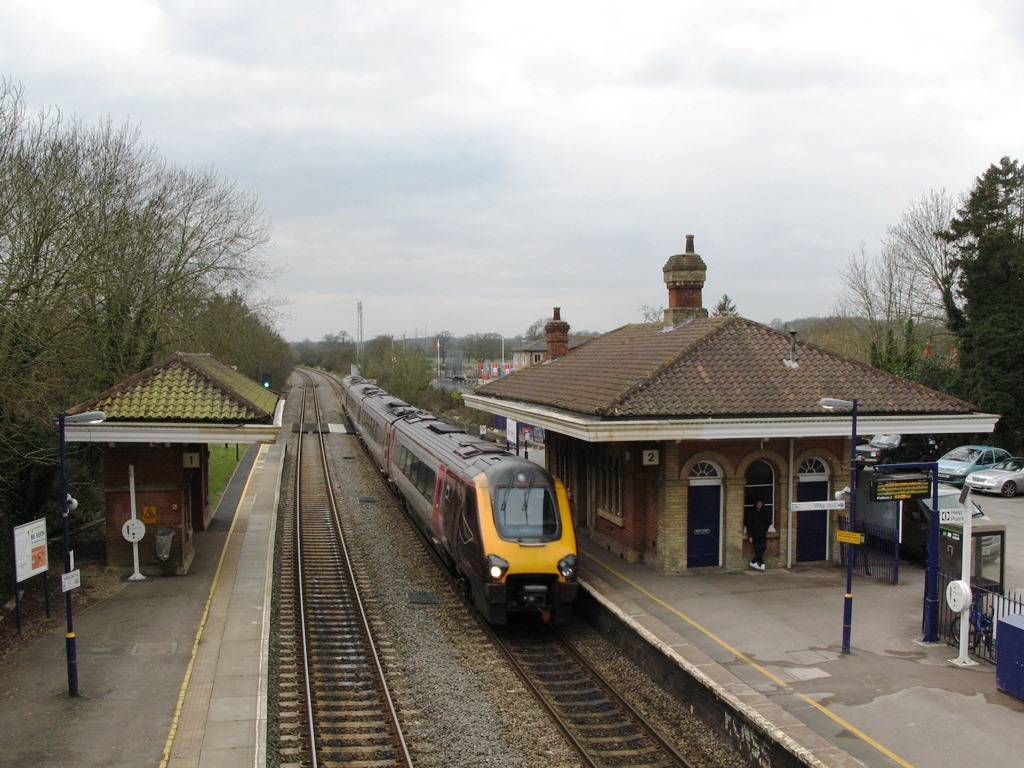
A northbound CrossCountry service speeds through Mortimer

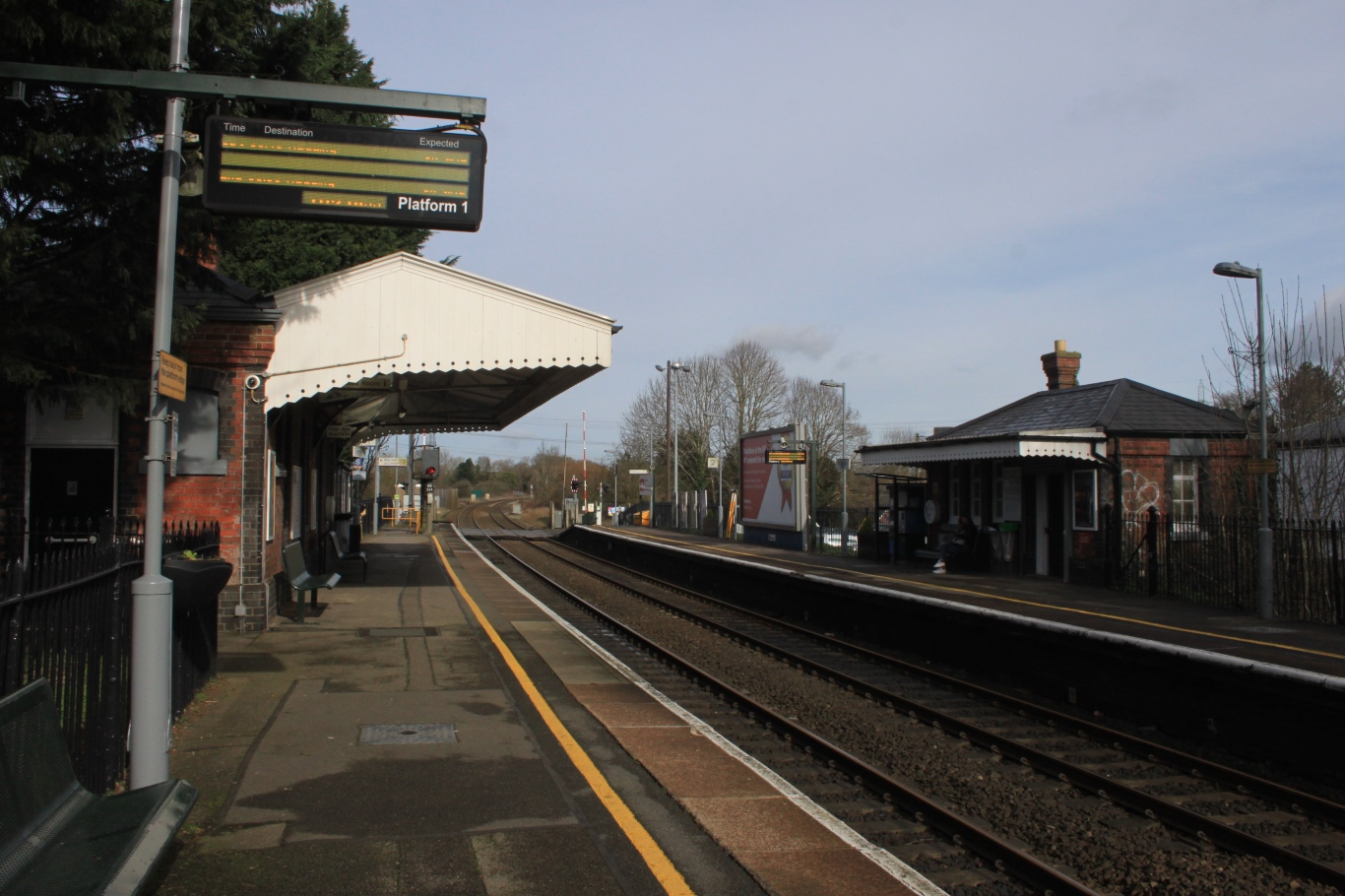
Bramley, looking towards Reading

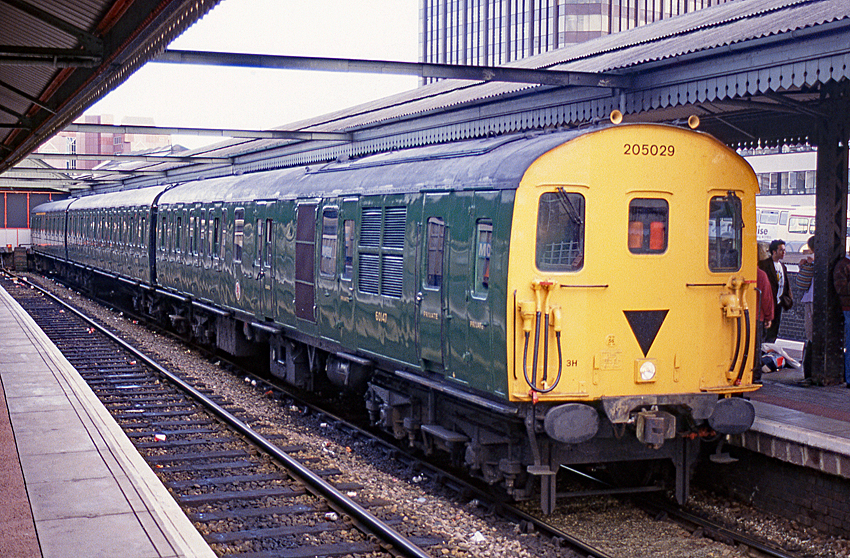
In BR days the line was operated by Southern Region 3H, Class 205, units
