= Oxford Road, Reading =

Street in Reading, England

Oxford Road
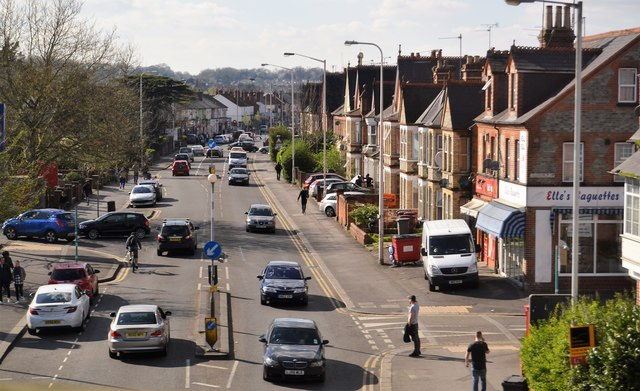
- Oxford Road looking west from Reading West railway bridge
- Interactive map of Oxford Road
- Former name: Pangbourne Lane
- Length: 3 mi (4.8 km)
- Location: Reading, England
- Coordinates: 51.464°N 1.015°W

Oxford Road is an urban street and major arterial road, mostly designated as the A329, in the English town of Reading. Beginning in the town centre at the meeting of St. Mary's Butts, West Street and Broad Street, the road continues to the borough boundary near Tilehurst railway station. Beyond the borough boundary, the A329 continues west to Pangbourne and eventually to the city of Oxford. The road was previously known as Pangbourne Lane.

Because of the prominence of the road in that area, the term Oxford Road or Oxford Road area is often used to describe the northern part of West Reading.

== Route ==
Looking west from start of Oxford Road

Oxford Street begins in Reading town centre, as a continuation of Broad Street, the main pedestrianised shopping street in Reading, at its intersection with St. Mary's Butts and West Street. Travelling west, the road passes between the Broad Street Mall and the former McIlroy's department store (see below), before crossing the town's Inner Distribution Road on a bridge.

Reading West railway station and bridge

Just after the bridge, the new Chatham Place residential development is to the right. Holy Trinity Church is then passed on the right, followed by a major intersection with Chatham Street and the Oxford Road Community School at 146 Oxford Road. The road then passes under a railway bridge at Reading West railway station before a junction with Western Elms Avenue, where the Oxford Road Community Garden is located.

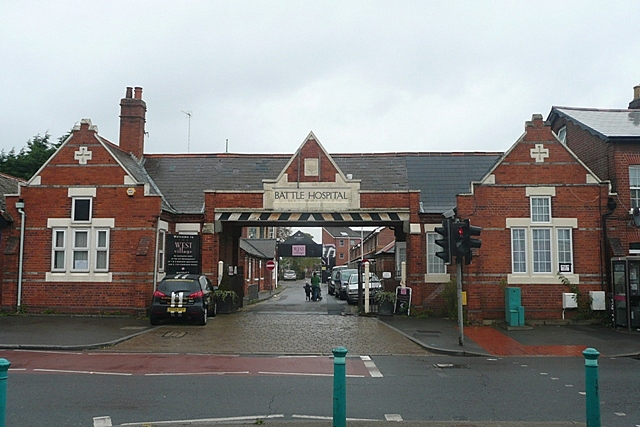
What remains of Battle Hospital

At 344 Oxford Road, the still extant gate to the former Battle Hospital is passed. The hospital site is now occupied by a Tesco Extra store and housing. Just past the Tesco, at 420 Oxford Road, Battle Library is located. Shortly thereafter, Brock Barracks, still in use by the Army, is passed, followed by the intersection with Water Road at the Pond House, once the terminus of Reading's electric trams.

Oxford Road beyond Norcot Junction

Beyond the Pond House, the Oxford Road reaches Norcot Junction, the junction with Norcot Hill that rises up to the centre of Tilehurst. Beyond here the nature of the road changes, losing its flanking Victorian-era terraced housing and becoming a wider road with the Great Western Main Line on one side and mid-20th century housing on the other.

The end of Reading, if not the road

Eventually Tilehurst railway station is reached, followed shortly by the borough boundary. The road to the northwest becomes Purley Rise in Purley on Thames, leading onwards to Pangbourne and Oxford. For a short distance at the borough boundary, the Thames Path follows the Oxford Road, as part of its route to by-pass an out-of-use ferry on the river.

The Oxford road is designated as part of the A329 for most of its length, starting in the east at its junction with Chatham Street, and continuing to its end at the borough boundary.

== Public transport ==
A bus on route 16, on the bridge over the IDR and with the former McIlroy's department store in the distance

Oxford Road has long formed part of what came to be known as the Reading Main Line, Reading's principal public transport corridor that ran from east to west through the town. The main line started in 1879 with the Reading Tramways Company, who operated horse trams as far as Brock Barracks. The line was taken over and electrified by Reading Corporation Tramways in 1901, replaced by corporation trolleybuses in 1939, and again by motor buses in 1968.

The main line still exists today in the form of Reading Buses route 17, which operates along Oxford Road as far as Norcot Junction before heading uphill to serve Tilehurst. Other frequent routes that operate along the whole or part of Oxford Road include the 15 and 16. Between these three routes, during peak periods there are 14 buses per hour in either direction along the section of Oxford Road as far as the Pond House.

== Notable buildings ==
A department store belonging to the William McIlroy chain was opened at the eastern end of the road in 1903, and was known as the Crystal Palace of Reading. The building still exists, converted into apartments.

The first Little Chef restaurant was opened on Oxford Road in 1958. It was sited in the car park of the Rex Cinema, just to the east of Norcot Junction. The site is now occupied by the Winslet Place apartments.

== Notable residents ==
Mike Oldfield's family lived on Western Elms Avenue, where his Father worked as a general practitioner.
