= Reading Tramways Company =

Tramway operator in England

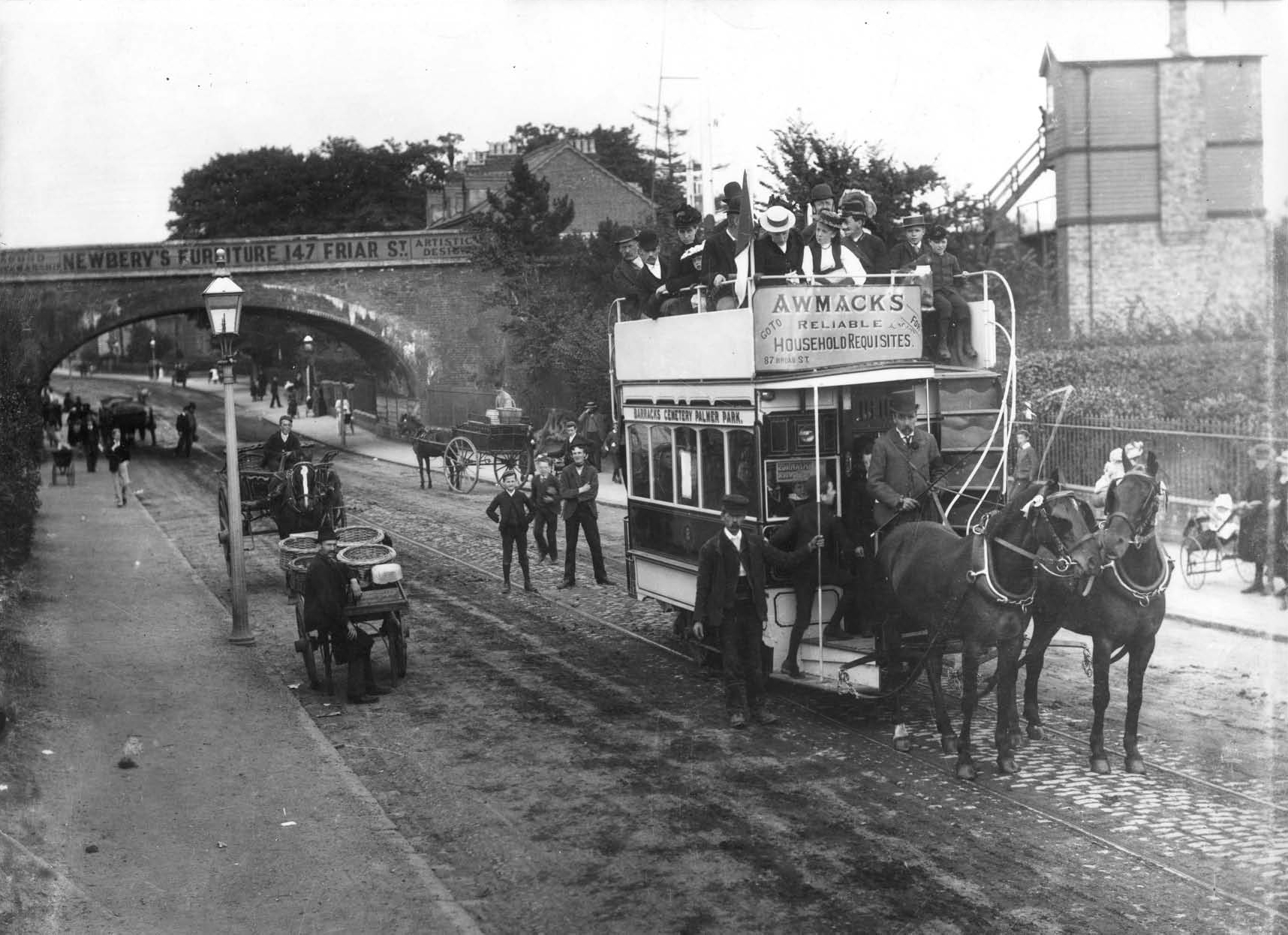
- Oxford Road in 1893

Operation
- Locale: Reading
- Open: 1879
- Close: 1901
- Status: Closed

Infrastructure
- Track gauge: 4 ft (1,219 mm)
- Propulsion system: Horse

Reading Tramways Company operated a horse-drawn tramway service in Reading in the English county of Berkshire between 1879 and 1901.

The company is one of the ancestors of the current Reading Buses, the town's municipally owned bus operator.

== History ==
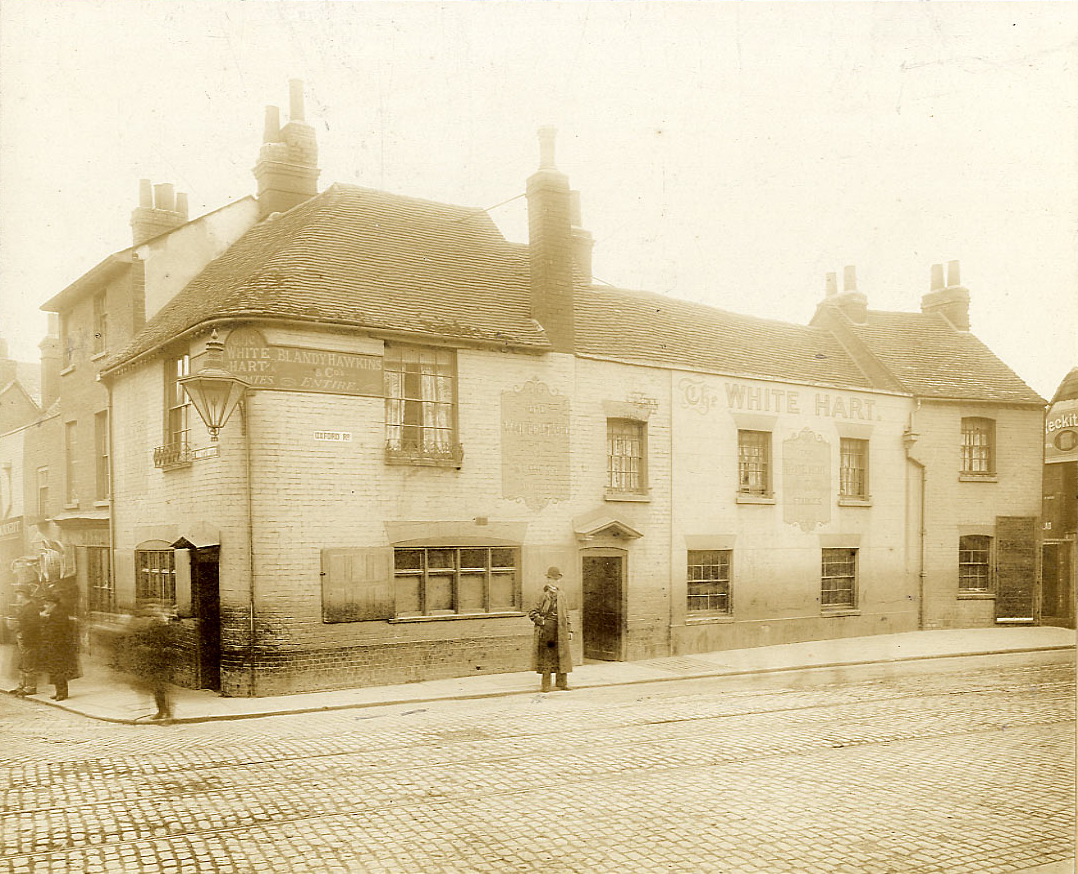
Horse tramlines in front of the White Hart Hotel, Oxford Road

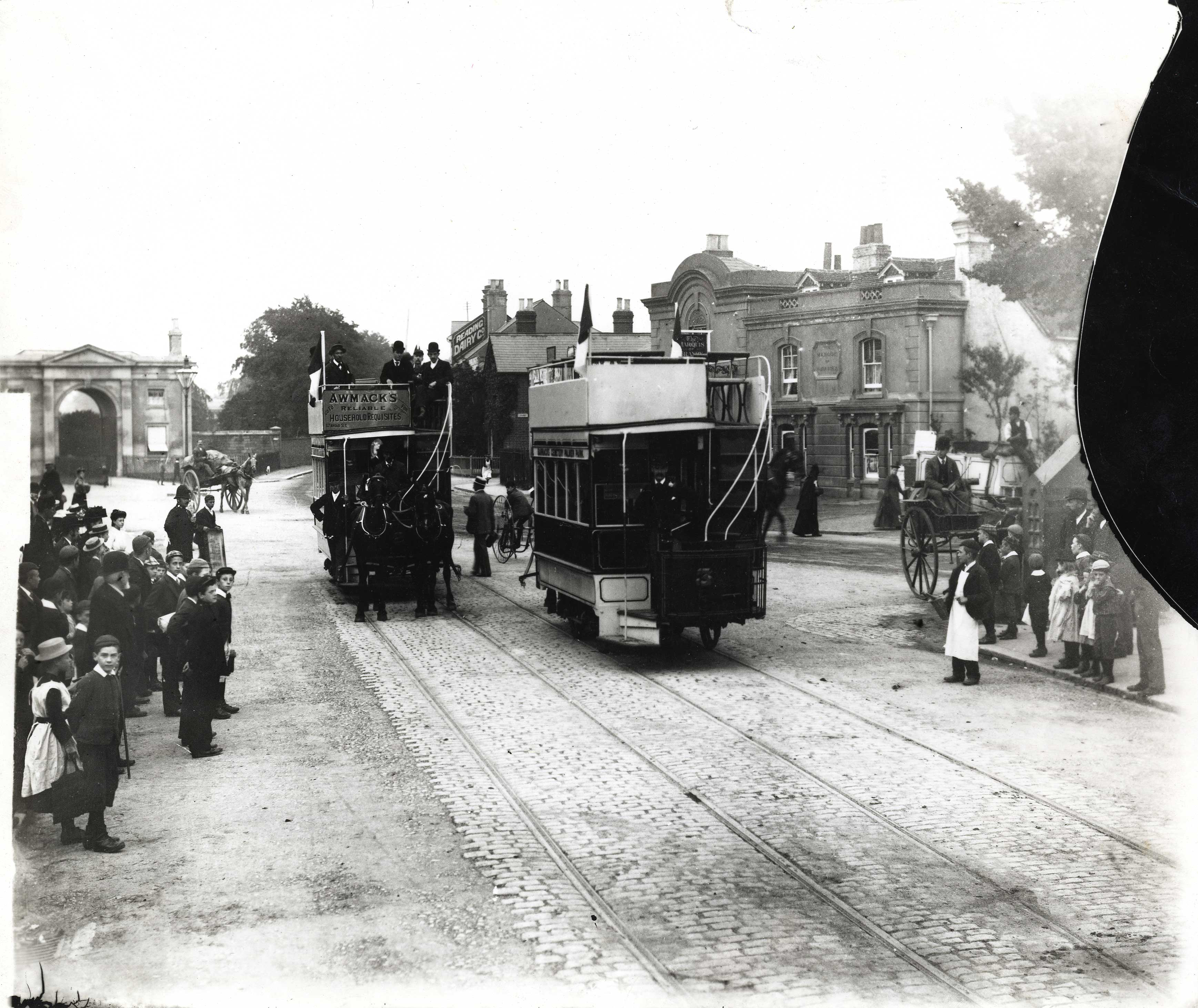
Horse trams at Cemetery Junction on 15 July 1893

The origins of Reading Transport can be traced back to 1878, when the privately owned Reading Tramways Company (part of the Imperial Tramways Company) was formed. They were initially authorised to construct and operate a horse tram route on an east–west alignment from Oxford Road through Broad Street in the town centre to Cemetery Junction. Significantly, this route formed the core of what became known as the main line of the tram and trolleybus network.

Construction started in January 1879, with the entire line being open by May. A fleet of six single decked cars were initially used, with 31 horses, providing a 20-minute frequency. The cars operated from a depot on the south side of the Oxford Road, immediately to the east of where Reading West railway station (opened 1906) was later built. By the 1890s the whole fleet had been replaced by double decked cars operating at a 10-minute frequency. The company made several proposals to extend the system, add routes and electrify the system. But none of these came to anything, and in 1899 the borough corporation decided to purchase the system.

== Closure ==
The purchase deal was completed on 31 October 1901, and the Reading Corporation Tramways came into being. The corporation set out about first extending, and then electrifying the system. The extensions were completed by December 1902, and the last horse cars ran in July of the following year.
