= William McIlroy (department store) =

Former British department store group

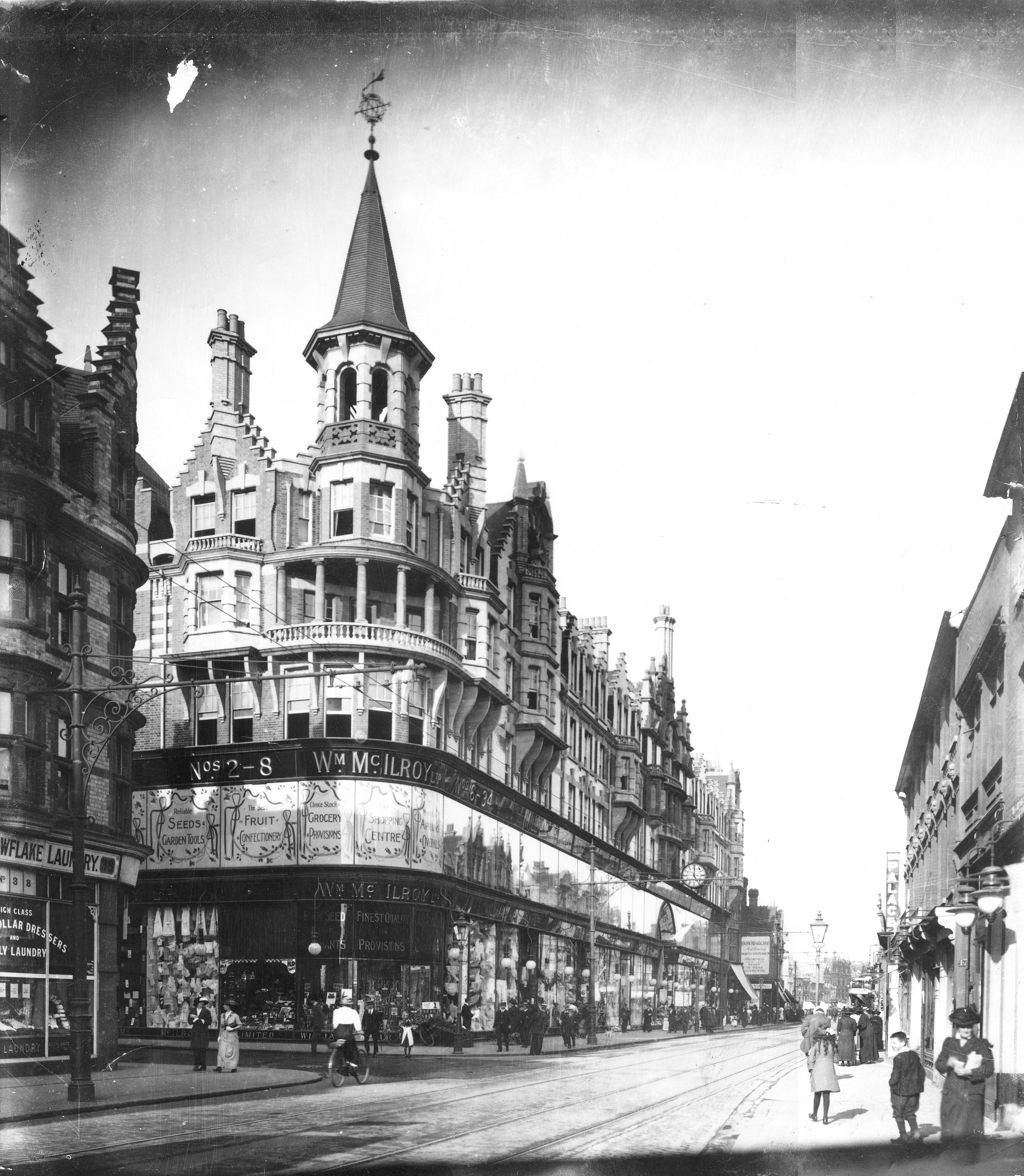
The William McIlroy department store on Oxford Road in Reading c. 1920

William McIlroy was a group of department stores started in Swindon in 1875 and finally closed in 1998.

== History ==
William McIlroy was an Irish draper who moved to England, where he opened his first store on Regent Street, Swindon in 1875. The store was purpose built as a department store with a grand clock and plate glass frontage.

The business grew, with William's brother-in-law James Wheeler and son Ewart joining the business, and 22 branches were opened up across England and Wales amongst them Bristol, East Grinstead, Kirkby in Ashfield, Minehead, Stroud, Portsmouth and most famously Oxford Road in Reading. The Oxford Road store was opened in 1903, and was known as the Crystal Palace of Reading because of its 2000 feet of plate glass windows, and employed over 1000 people.

The McIlroy family had strong connections with Reading, with William McIlroy being the mayor as well as donating land to form McIlroy Park.

During the First World War, McIlroys were given an order by the War Office for 45,000 beds. During the 1930s the grand ball room was added to the Swindon store, with the chandeliers and panelling coming from the cruise liner Mauretania. Stars who performed there included Diana Dors and The Beatles (1962).

In the 1950s the business started to struggle and changed hands. Stores were closed, including the Reading store in 1955.

The Swindon store however continued to operate. The famous clock tower was removed in the 1960s for safety reasons and replaced with a smaller, less ornate clock front. In 1975 a grand sale took place to celebrate 100 years. The Caernarfon store was destroyed by a fire in 1992 and was not rebuilt. The business owned by textile giant Courtaulds was sold to Mackays Stores in the early 1990s.

However, on 13 January 1998, the store was closed by its owners Mackays, citing that it could not compete with rivals Debenhams, House of Fraser and the Designer Outlet Centre. This confused many as in 1997 a report claimed McIlroys to be the UK's eighth most profitable department store. The store was demolished and rebuilt as a branch of H&M and is now home to the fashion chain Flannels.

== Locations ==
- Aylesbury
- Banbury
- Bath
- Brentford (formerly Pierce & Lewis)
- Bristol (formerly Baker, Baker & Co)
- Caernarfon (formerly Brymer & Davies known as the Nelson Emporium; destroyed by fire in 1992)
- Darlington (formerly a Debenhams store, originally Bainbridge Barker)
- East Grinstead
- Fareham
- Gosport (formerly William Rowe)
- Havant
- High Wycombe
- Horsham (Tanner & Chart)
- Kirkby-in-Ashfield
- Maidenhead
- Marlow (John Morgan & Son)
- Minehead
- Newbury
- Portsmouth
- Reading
- Southampton
- Stroud (formerly Clarks)
- Swindon
- Waterlooville
