= Reading Corporation Tramways =

Tramway operator in England

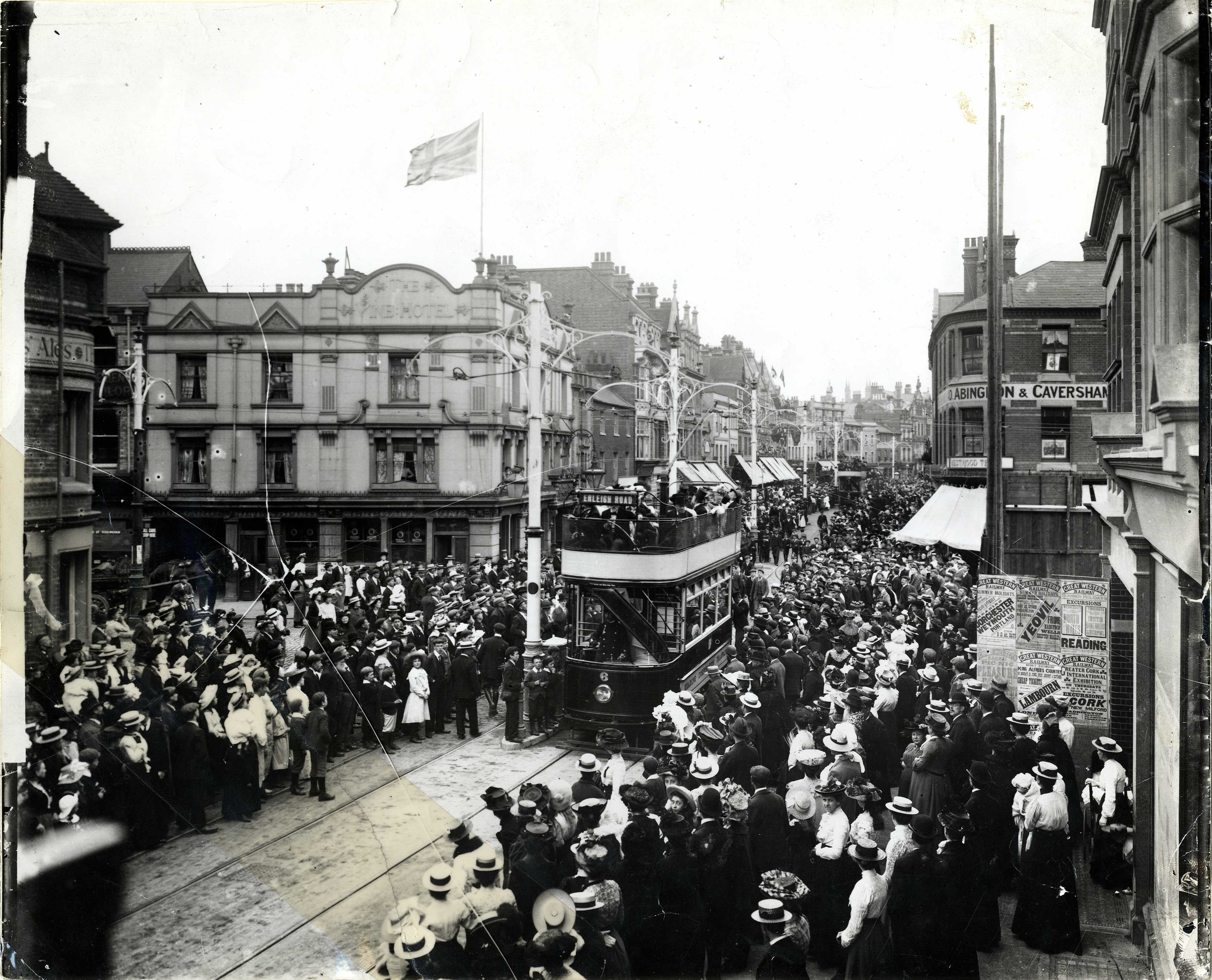
- Tram No. 6 has just crossed the junction, heading westwards along Oxford Road. Photograph taken on 22 July 1903, the first day of operation for the electric cars. Photograph by Walton Adams.

Operation
- Locale: Reading
- Open: 1 November 1901
- Close: 20 May 1939
- Status: Closed

Infrastructure
- Track gauge: 4 ft (1,219 mm)
- Propulsion system: Electric
- Depot: Mill Lane

Statistics
- Route length: 7.45 miles (11.99 km)

Reading Corporation Tramways operated a tramway service in Reading in the English county of Berkshire between 1901 and 1939.

The tramway is one of the ancestors of the current Reading Buses, the town's municipally owned bus operator.

== History ==
The corporation purchased the assets of the horse drawn services of the Reading Tramways Company and took ownership from 1901. Modernisation was undertaken and the first electric service started operating in July 1903. Extensions were constructed to the Wokingham Road and London Road (both from Cemetery Junction), and new routes added to Whitley, Caversham Road, Erleigh Road and Bath Road. The trams operated from a new depot in Mill Lane, a site that was to remain Reading Transport's main depot until it was demolished to make way for The Oracle shopping mall in 1998.

The electric tram services were originally operated by 30 four-wheeled double decked cars supplied by Dick, Kerr & Co. In 1904, six bogie cars and a water car (used for keeping down the dust on the streets) were added to the fleet, also from Dick, Kerr & Co. No further trams were acquired, and a planned extension from the Caversham Road terminus across Caversham Bridge to Caversham itself was abandoned because of the outbreak of World War I. The war also led to a significant maintenance backlog.

== Closure ==
In 1919, Reading Corporation started operating its first motor buses. These ran from Caversham Heights to Tilehurst, running over the tram lines and beyond the tram termini. Because of the state of the track, the Bath Road tram route was abandoned in 1930, followed by the Erleigh Road route in 1932. Eventually it was decided that the tramways should be abandoned and replaced by trolleybuses, operating over extended routes. The last tram ran on the Caversham Road to Whitley route in July 1936, and last car on the main line ran in May 1939.

All remaining infrastructure was removed after the subsequent cessation of trolleybuses in 1968, with the exception of a pole outside The Three Tuns pub near the Wokingham Road route terminus, and a plaque on the Erleigh Road route. A cast-iron urinal, which was formerly sited at the Erleigh Road terminus of the tramway and intended for use by the tram crews, has been preserved and restored. It can now be found in the National Tramway Museum, at Crich in the English county of Derbyshire. A larger public convenience erected at the Caversham Bridge terminus in 1906 has been preserved at the Chiltern Open Air Museum.

== Gallery ==
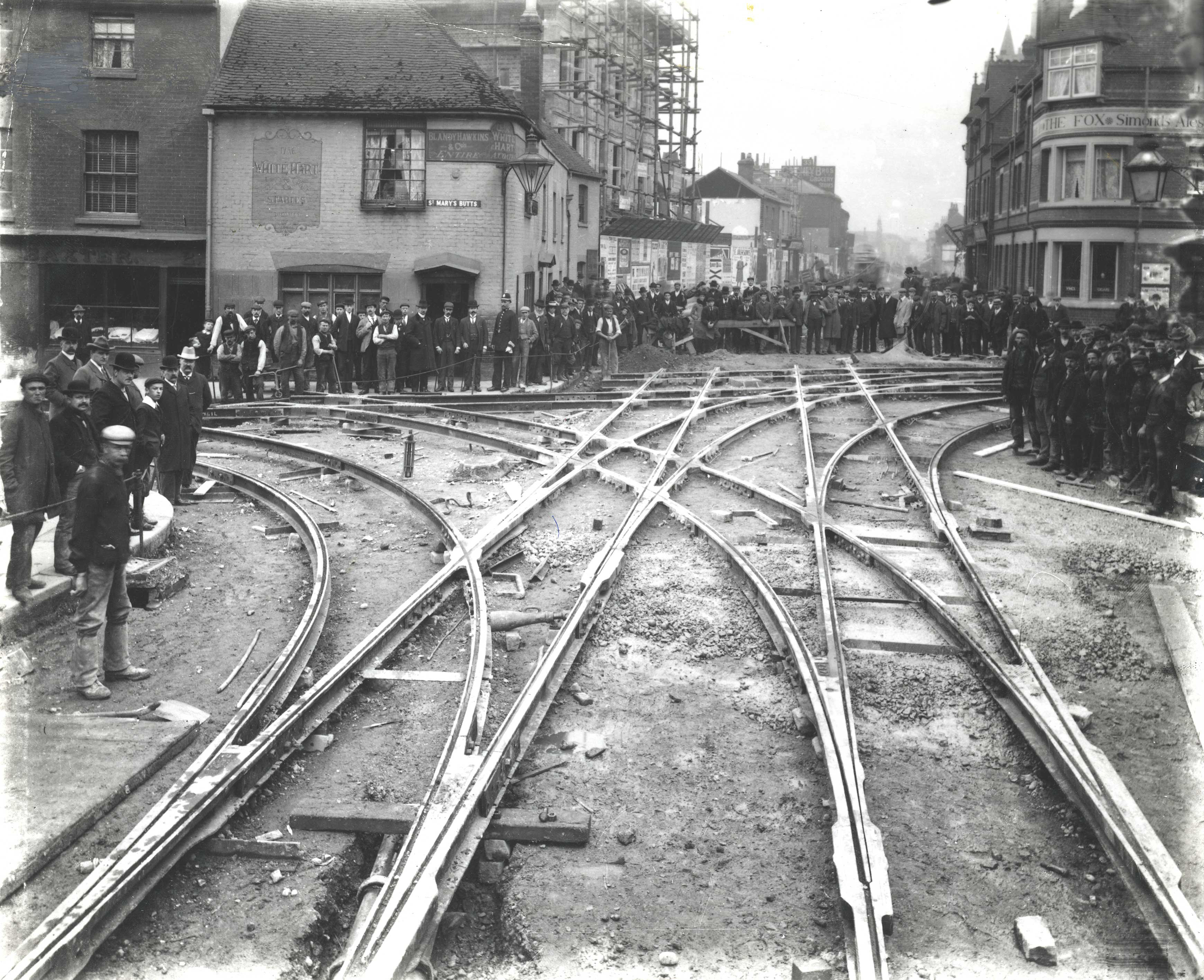
The crossing at the junction of Broad Street, St. Mary's Butts, Oxford Road and West Street, looking westwards along Oxford Road, 1903. The rails are in place, but not yet filled in with setts.

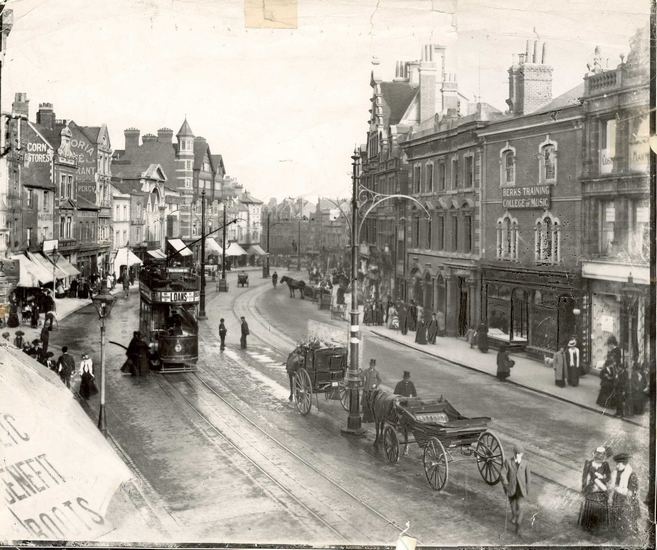
Broad Street, Reading, looking eastwards from an upper storey window, c. 1904. A tramcar heads eastwards, and two horse-drawn cabs wait in the middle of the road, by the trolley-pole.

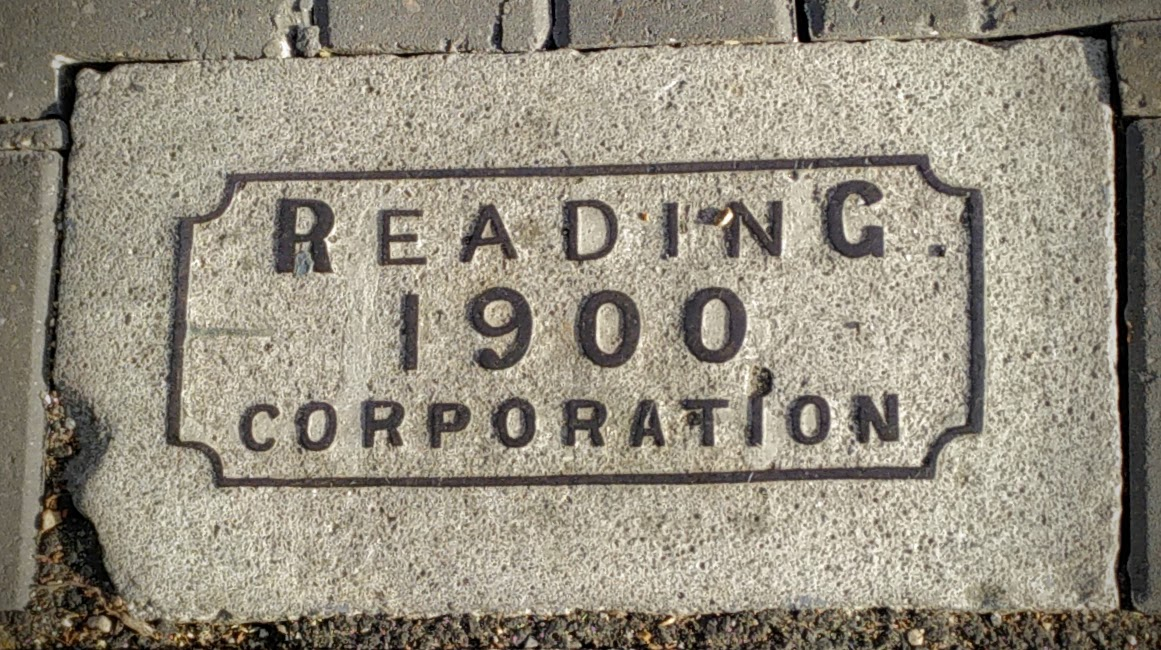
A plaque in Erleigh Road on the pavement outside Café YOLK, placed around 1903 to herald the arrival of the electric tram.

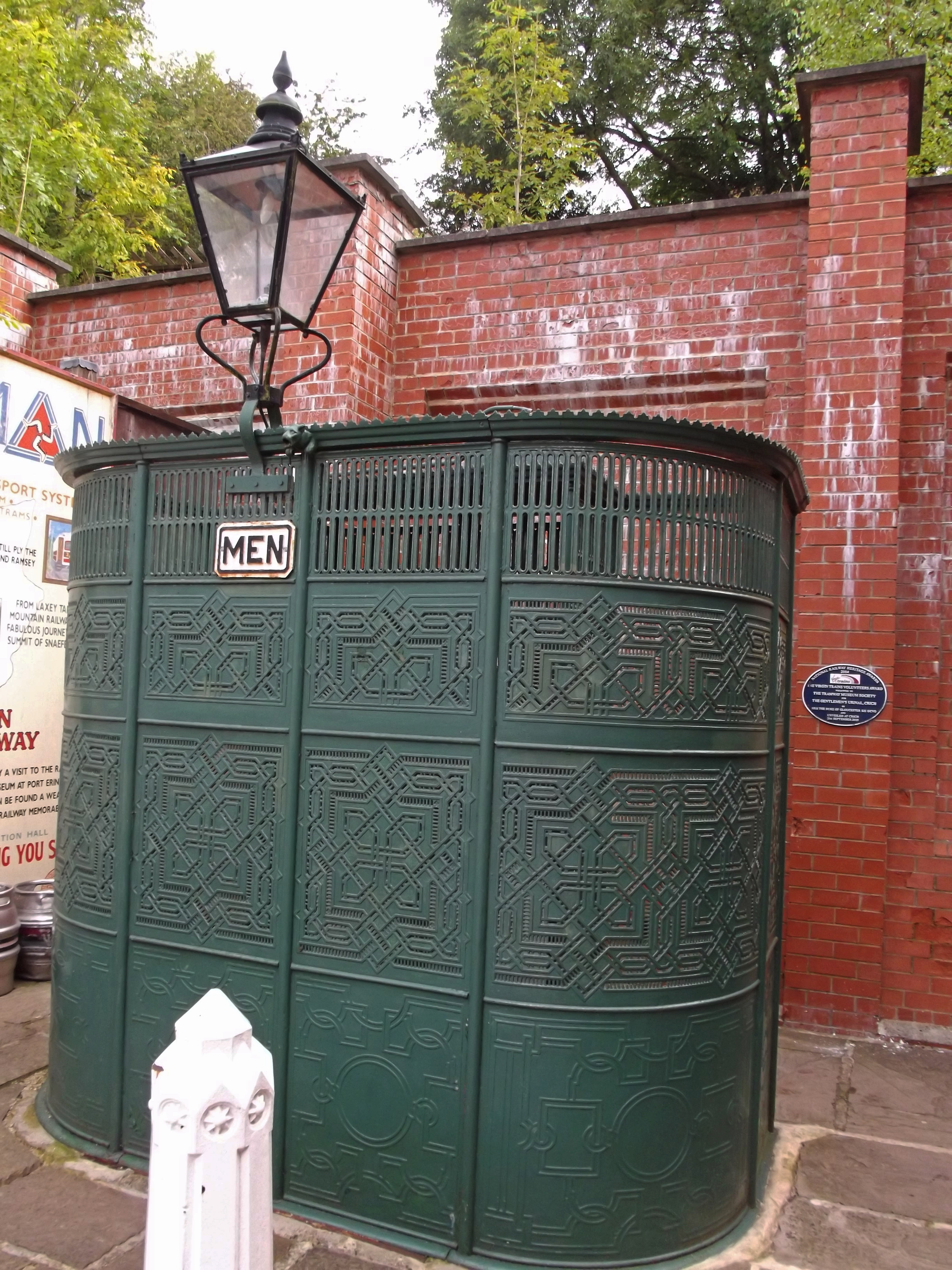
This cast-iron urinal was formerly sited at the Erleigh Road terminus and is now at the National Tramway Museum.
