= Tilehurst railway station =

Railway station in Berkshire, England

Coordinates: 51°28′17.40″N 1°01′46.20″W

Tilehurst
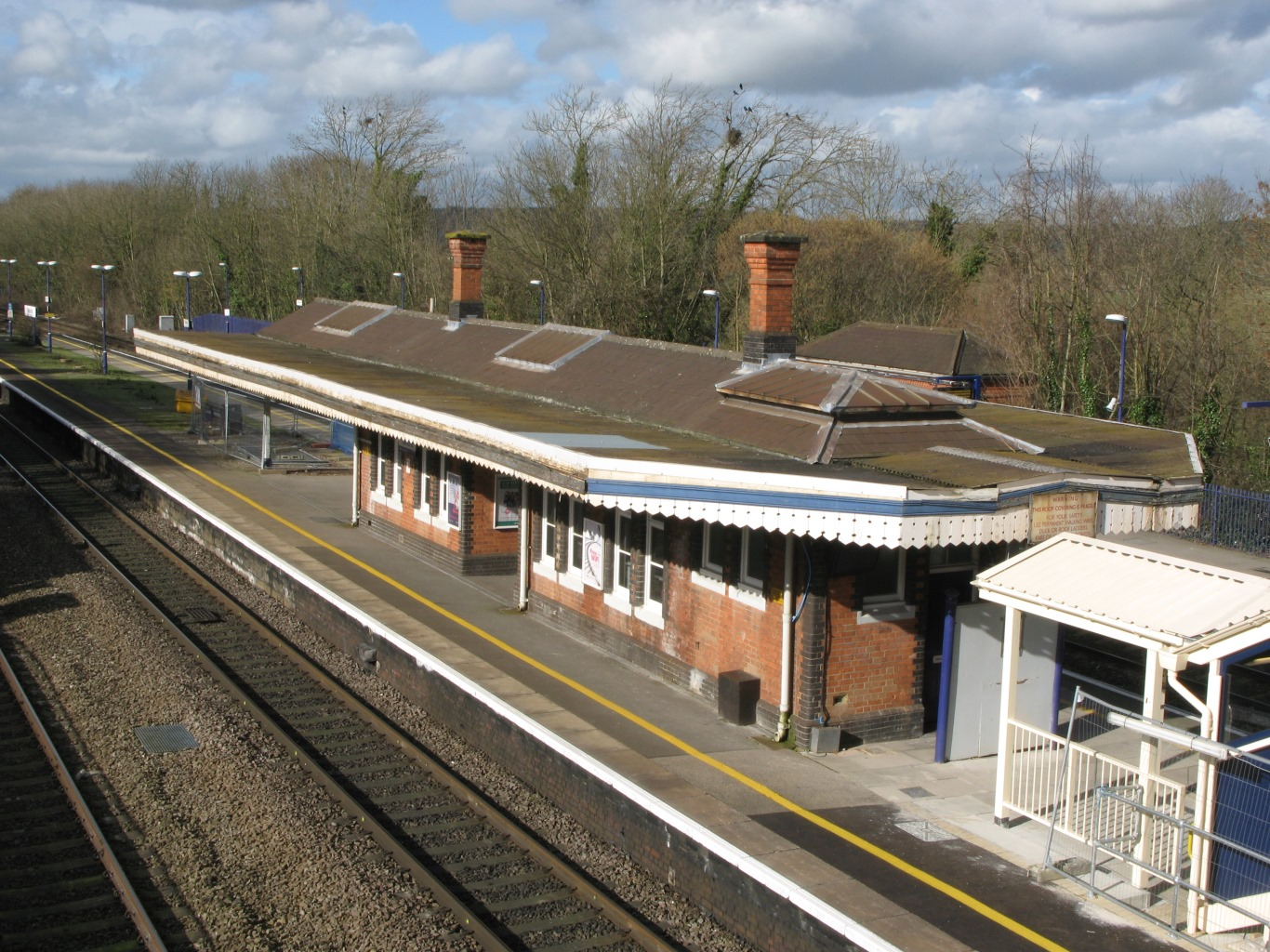
- The main building seen in 2014 before overhead electrification wires were erected

General information
- Location: Tilehurst, Borough of Reading; England
- Grid reference: SU674752
- Manager: Great Western Railway
- Platforms: 4

Other information
- Station code: TLH
- Classification: DfT category E

History
- Opened: 1882
- Original company: Great Western Railway
- Pre-grouping: GWR
- Post-grouping: GWR

Passengers
- 2020/21: ▼91,930
- 2021/22: ▲0.241 million
- 2022/23: ▲0.320 million
- 2023/24: ▲0.357 million
- 2024/25: ▲0.385 million
Location
- Location within Reading, Berkshire
Notes
- Passenger statistics from the Office of Rail and Road

Tilehurst railway station serves the suburb and village of Tilehurst, west of Reading, Berkshire, England. The station is on the extreme northern edge of Tilehurst and at a much lower level than most of that suburb. The railway line and station occupy a strip of land between the A329 road and the River Thames, with the up relief platform on an embankment above the river bank.

The station is on the Great Western Main Line between Reading to the east and Pangbourne to the west; it is served by local services operated by Great Western Railway. It is 38 miles 52 chains (38.65 mi; 62.2 km) west of London Paddington.

== History ==
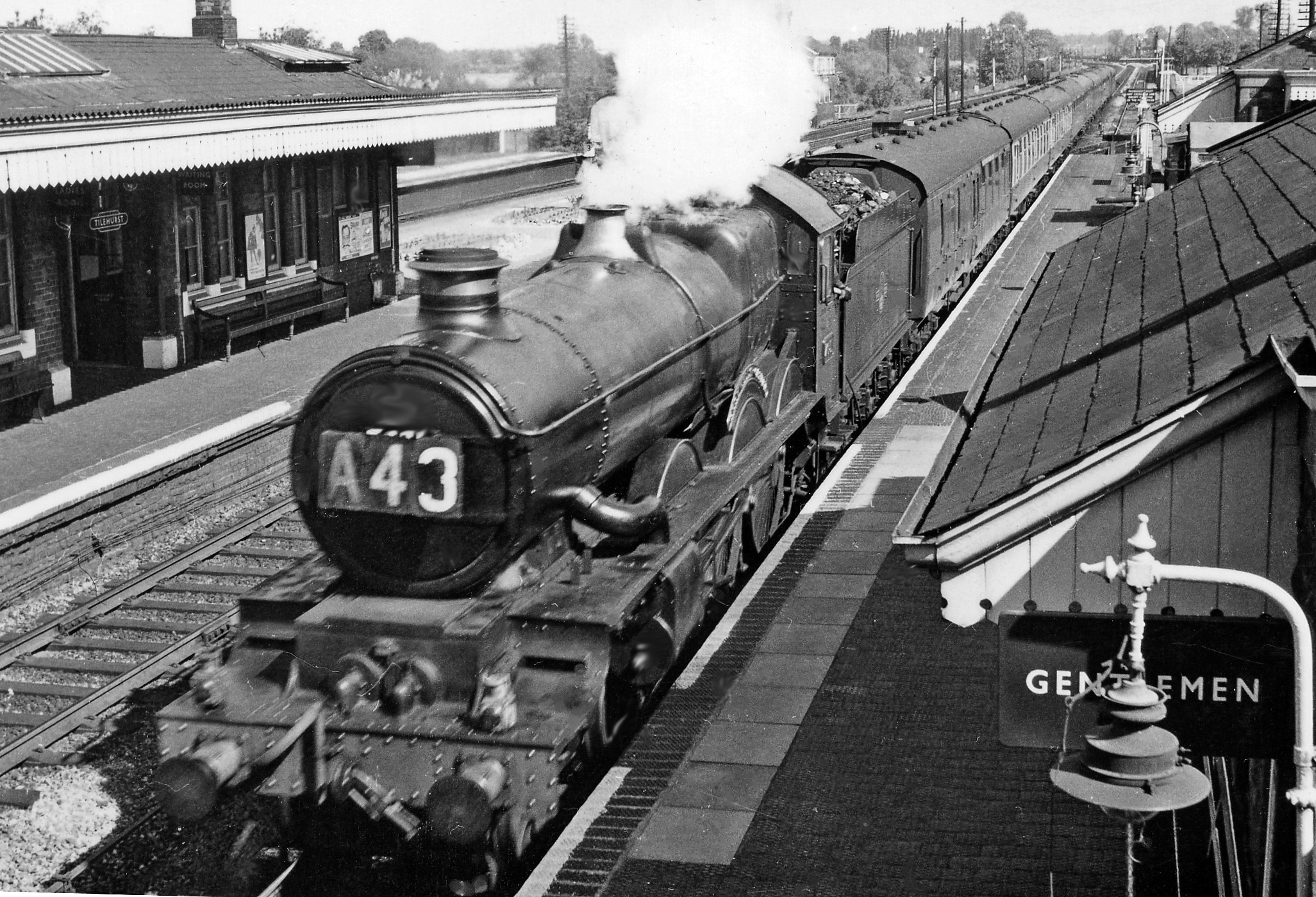
Down Hereford express in 1962

The station is on the original line of the Great Western Railway, which opened in 1841, and was itself opened to traffic in 1882.

In 2013, the redundant goods shed was demolished to make way for a new footbridge; this was necessary to give clearance for the overhead line electrification of the line. The new footbridge was opened in early December 2013 and the old footbridge was demolished the following week.

Following various extended local campaigning efforts, a £4 million investment towards the installation of lifts and walkways at the station was approved in April of 2023. The project faced difficulties due to the complexities of working around the Victorian-era structure, and the reduced space available at platforms in close proximity to the river. After a series of delays, the upgrades were completed in April 2026, making all station platforms step-free and improving safety & accessibility to the station entrance with the addition of a walkway between the car park and Platform 1.

== Services ==
All services at Tilehurst are operated by Great Western Railway using Class 387 EMUs.

The typical off-peak is two trains per hour in each direction between London Paddington and Didcot Parkway. On Sundays, the service is reduced to hourly in each direction.

Preceding station	National Rail	Following station
Reading	Great Western Railway Great Western Main Line Stopping Services	Pangbourne

== Facilities ==
The station has four platforms, one on each of the fast and relief (slow) lines, although the platforms on the fast lines see little use except during track works on the line between Reading and Didcot. The platforms are linked to each other and the station entrance, on the down fast platform, by a footbridge that is accessible by both stairs and lifts. Toilets are available in the building on the central platform. The station car park has spaces for 118 cars and is linked to Platform 1 via a walkway.

There is a waiting room on the middle platform. A small waiting room was built on the north platform but, although it looks old, it is of modern construction.

The main ticket office on the south side is usually staffed on weekday mornings, but tickets can also be purchased from an automatic machine using debit or credit cards only.

== Future plans ==
Whilst the £4 million project to install lifts and new walkways at the station was completed in 2026, plans to provide the station car park a second level, increasing capacity to 217 cars, remain unfunded and on hold. Proposals also included plans for a new covered and secure cycle area for up to 100 bikes, extra retail facilities, and an upgraded station forecourt. These plans were announced in 2020, originally suggesting an expected completion date in 2024 subject to funding.

== In literature ==
The railway at Tilehurst was mentioned in less than glowing terms by Jerome K. Jerome in chapter 16 of Three Men in a Boat: "The river becomes very lovely from a little above Reading. The railway rather spoils it near Tilehurst, but from Mapledurham up to Streatley it is glorious."
