= Reading Buses =

British municipal bus operator

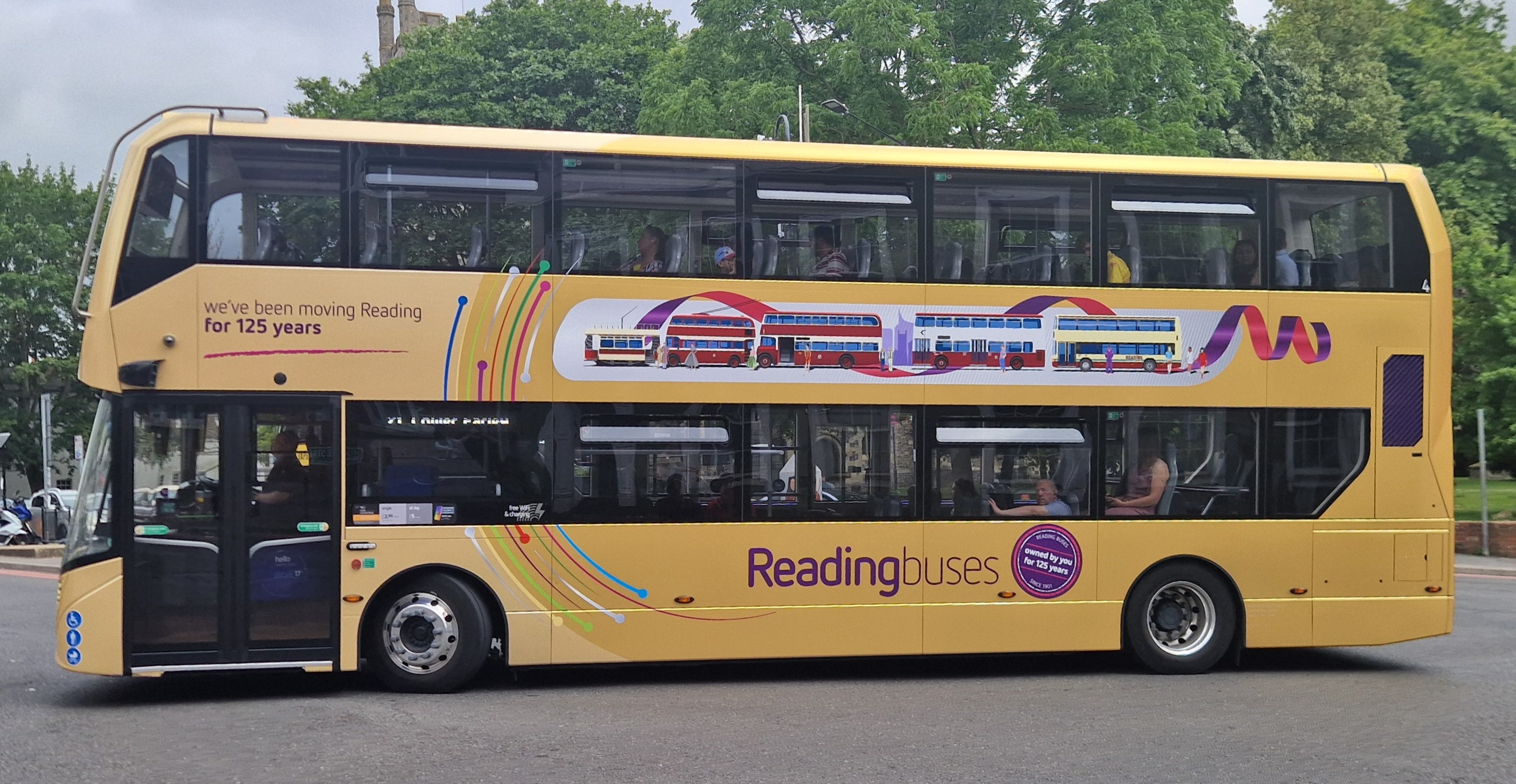
- Battery electric bus 4 in a colour scheme celebrating the company's history
- Parent: Reading Borough Council
- Founded: 31 October 1901; 124 years ago
- Headquarters: Reading
- Service area: Berkshire; Greater London; Surrey; Oxfordshire; Hampshire
- Service type: Bus services
- Routes: 60
- Destinations: Reading; Bracknell; Newbury; Wokingham; Slough; Windsor; Maidenhead
- Fleet: 173 (April 2025)
- Fuel type: Diesel; Natural Gas; Electric
- Operator: Reading Transport Ltd
- Chief executive: Robert Williams
- Website: www.reading-buses.co.uk

Reading Transport Limited, trading as Reading Buses, is an English municipal bus operator owned by Reading Borough Council, and directly serving the town of Reading and its surrounding area, including interurban routes to Bracknell, Newbury, Slough, Windsor, Maidenhead, Wokingham and London.

In addition to its directly operated services under the Reading Buses brand, Reading Transport also owns Thames Valley Buses, operating local services in the area including Bracknell, Maidenhead, Slough, Windsor and Wokingham, and Newbury & District, operating local services in Newbury and west Berkshire.

== History ==
=== Horse tram era ===
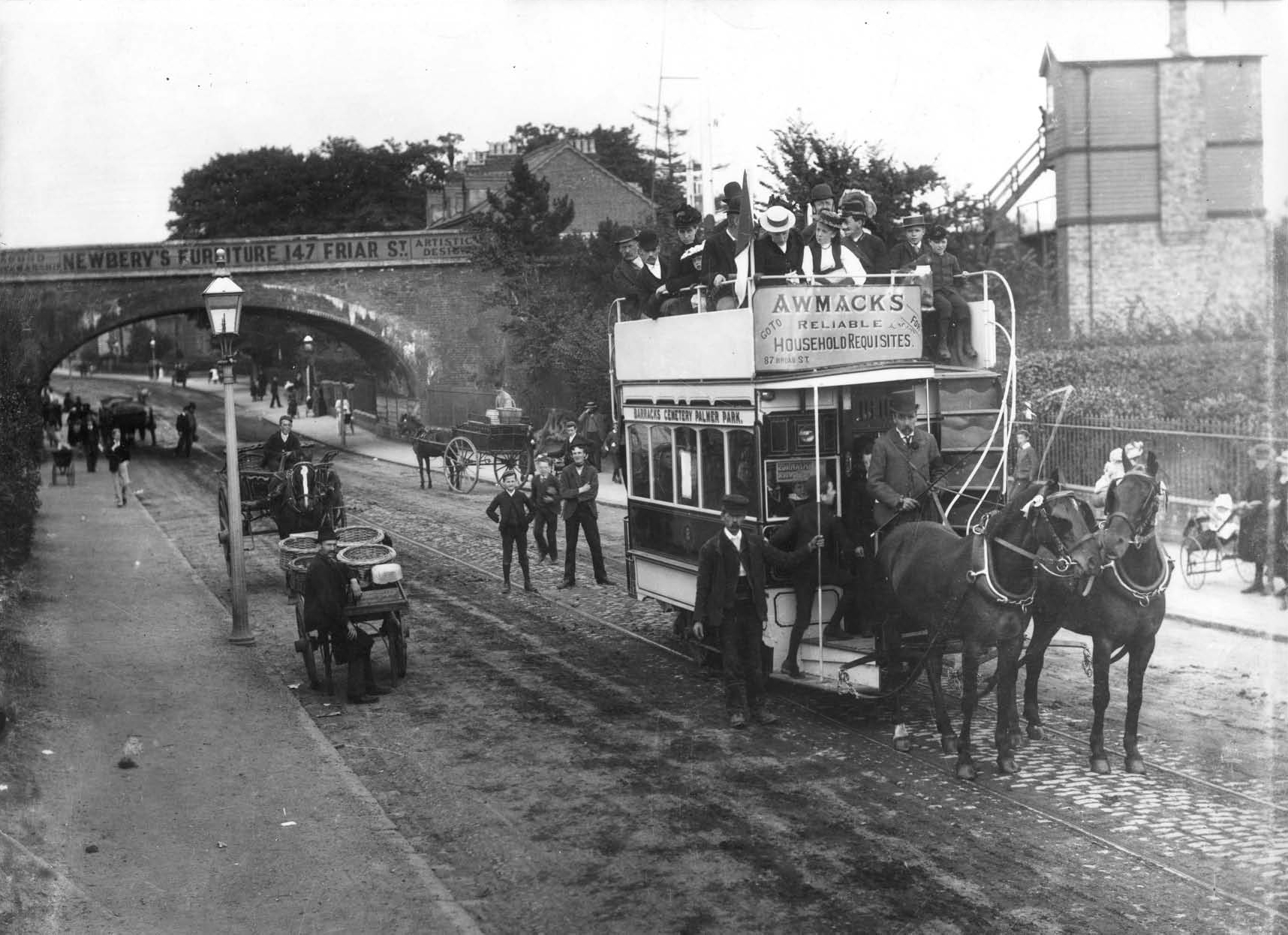
Horse tram on Oxford Road in 1893

The origins of Reading Transport can be traced back to the 19th century, when the privately owned Reading Tramways Company (part of the Imperial Tramways Company) was formed. The company was authorised to construct and operate a horse tram route on an east–west alignment from Oxford Road through Broad Street in the town centre to Cemetery Junction. This route formed the core of what became known as the main line of the tram, trolleybus and bus network.

Construction started in January 1879, with the entire line open by May. A fleet of six single-decked cars were initially used, with 31 horses, providing a 20-minute frequency. The cars operated from a depot on the south side of the Oxford Road, immediately to the east of Reading West railway station. By the 1890s the whole fleet had been replaced by double-decked cars operating at a 10-minute frequency. The company made several proposals to add routes and electrify the system, but none of these were implemented, and in 1899 the borough corporation decided to purchase the system.

The purchase deal was completed on 31 October 1901, and Reading Corporation Tramways came into being. The corporation set out about first extending, and then electrifying the system. The extensions were completed by December 1902, and the last horse cars ran in July of the following year.

=== Electric tram era ===
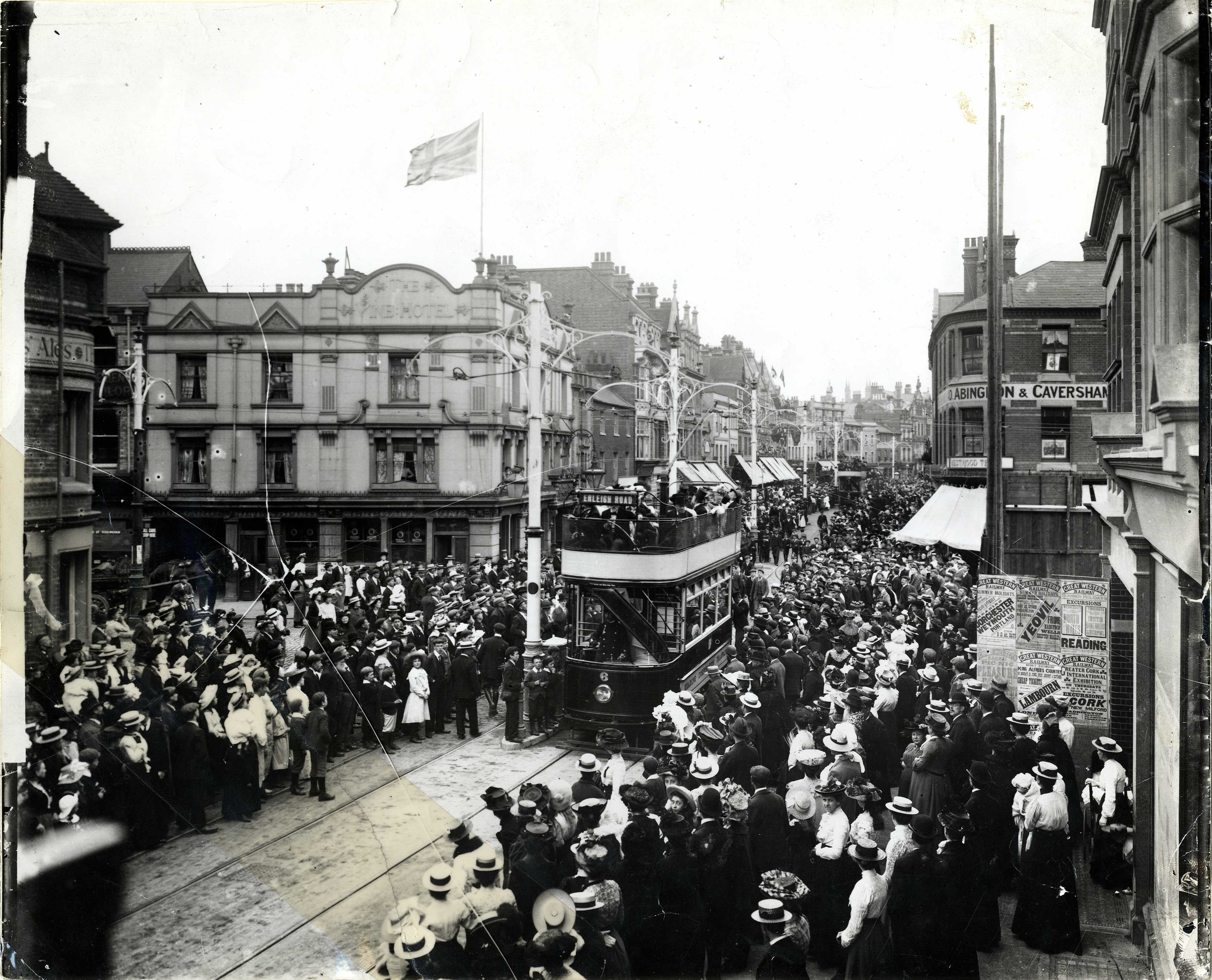
Reading Corporation Tramways opening ceremony on 22 July 1903

The new electric trams started operating in July 1903. Extensions were constructed to the Wokingham Road and London Road (both from Cemetery Junction), and new routes added to Whitley, Caversham Road, Erleigh Road and Bath Road. The trams operated from a new depot in Mill Lane, a site that was to remain Reading Transport's main depot until it was demolished to make way for The Oracle shopping mall in 1998.

The electric tram services were originally operated by 30 four-wheeled double decked cars supplied by Dick, Kerr & Co. In 1904, six bogie cars and a water car (used for keeping down the dust on the streets) were added to the fleet, from the same manufacturer. No further trams were acquired, and a planned extension from the Caversham Road terminus across Caversham Bridge to Caversham itself was abandoned because of the outbreak of World War I. The war also led to a significant maintenance backlog.

In 1919, Reading Corporation started operating its first motor buses. These ran from Caversham Heights to Tilehurst, running over the tram lines and beyond the tram termini. Because of the state of the track, the Bath Road tram route was abandoned in 1930, followed by the Erleigh Road route in 1932. Eventually it was decided that the tramways should be abandoned and replaced by trolleybuses, operating over extended routes. The last tram ran on the Caversham Road to Whitley route in July 1936, and the last car on the main line ran in May 1939.

=== Trolleybus era ===
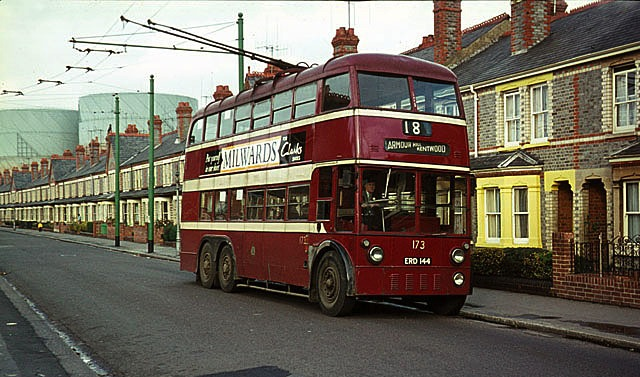
Trolleybus in Newtown in 1965

The first trolleybus wiring erected was a training loop on Erleigh Road, which opened in early 1936. This loop was never used in public service, and was subsequently dismantled. Public service commenced on 18 July 1936, on a route replacing the tram route from Caversham Road to Whitley Street. In May 1939, the remaining tram routes from Oxford Road to Wokingham Road and London Road were converted to trolleybus operation, with a short extension from Wokingham Road to the Three Tuns, and a much longer extension from the Oxford Road through the centre of Tilehurst to the Bear Inn. The extended main line, from the Three Tuns to the Bear, still exists today as bus route 17, the town's busiest and most frequent route, and the first to be designated a premier route.

During World War II a trolleybus branch was constructed from the Oxford Road to Kentwood Hill, enabling trolleybuses to replace motor buses with a consequential saving in precious oil-based fuel. In 1949 the Whitley Street line was extended to Whitley Wood and Northumberland Avenue, and a short branch was built to Reading General station. Subsequent short extensions took the system to its full extent, with the Kentwood route running to Armour Hill and the Northumberland Avenue line running to the junction with Whitley Wood Road.

By 1965, most UK trolleybus systems had closed, and the manufacturers of the overhead equipment gave notice that they would cease production. At the same time the trolleybuses were criticised in the local press because they cost more to operate than motor buses and were inflexible, even though the trolleybuses were profitable (Reading's motor buses made a loss), faster and less polluting. Reading Corporation decided to abandon the trolleybus system, and the routes were phased out between January 1967 and November 1968.

The UK's first contra-flow bus lane was instigated along Kings Road, when that road was made one-way in the early 1960s. The trolleybuses continued to operate two-way, as it was considered uneconomic to erect wiring on the new inbound route, London Road. The concept of the contra-flow bus lane was proved successful, and adopted in other places for motor buses.

=== Deregulation ===
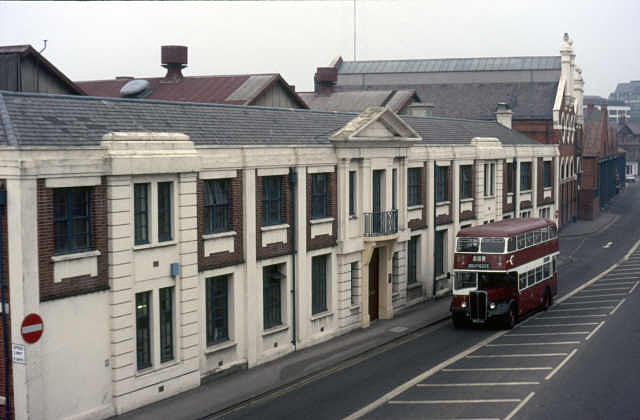
Reading Transport offices in 1985, showing contraflow buslane in Mill Lane (now The Oracle shopping centre)

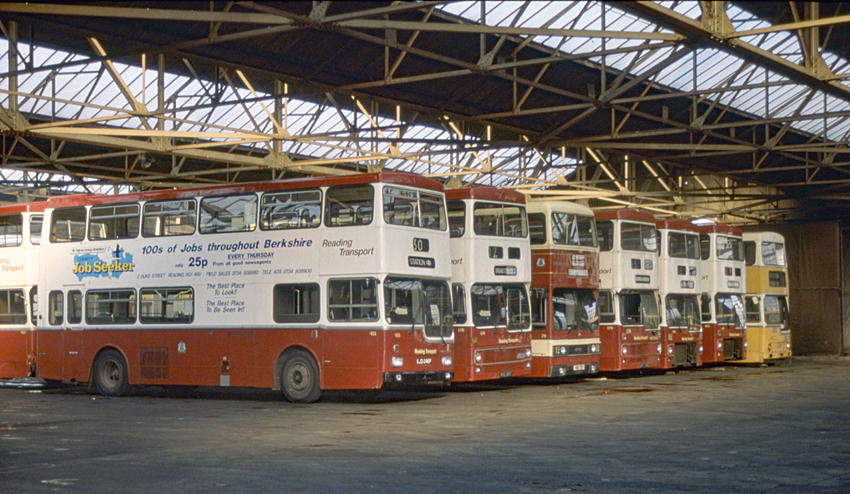
Reading Transport's Mill Lane depot interior in 1989

The Transport Act 1980 deregulated long-distance bus services. Reading Transport took advantage of this new freedom to start a service from Reading through London to Southend. The service was numbered X1 and was run jointly with Southend Transport. In 1982 the X1 was shortened to run from Reading to Aldgate in East London, under the Goldline brand, and joint operation ceased.

As a result of the legislation that accompanied the deregulation of local bus services in 1986, the operations of Reading Transport were transferred to Reading Transport Limited, an arms length company whose shares were held by Reading Borough Council. In 1991 Reading Transport was rebranded Reading Buses.

Bus deregulation also meant that the local council no longer had any power to regulate the routes and fares of Reading Transport, nor could they prevent other operators from starting competitive services within the borough. Councillor Tony Page was appointed to chair the new company, a role he would continue to hold until 2005.

=== Expansion and competition ===
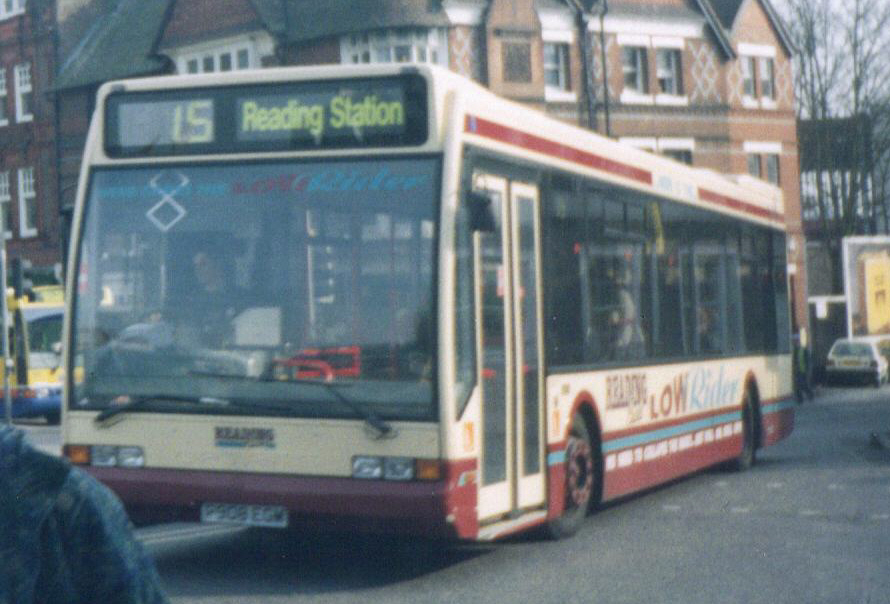
Optare Excel LowRider in 1999 in a variant of the livery used until the introduction of premier routes

In 1992 Reading Transport acquired the Reading and Newbury operations of BeeLine, one of the privatised successors to the state-owned Alder Valley. These acquisitions led to Reading Transport operating buses in Newbury, and in the rural areas around Reading and Newbury, for the first time. These buses were operated under the brand Newbury Buses.

Additionally, BeeLine had operated a Reading to London service under the LondonLink name, and that was merged into the Goldline service and the resulting service renamed London Line. The Goldline name was retained for use by Reading Transport's non-scheduled service business. The London Line service ceased in 2000.

Reading Buses faced competition on Reading urban routes from 1994, when Reading Mainline, an independent company, started operations with 10 AEC Routemasters acquired from Southend Transport, later expanding to 45 Routemasters on letter-designated routes. Reading Buses initially retaliated with the registration of a new limited-stop service using Optare MetroRiders under the Fast-Line brand before introducing a low-cost unit with unbranded minibuses running against Mainline routes E, F and H. Labour shortages created problems for the competitor, and Reading Buses acquired Reading Mainline in May 1998. Reading Transport continued to operate the Routemasters under the Reading Mainline brand until they were finally withdrawn on 22 July 2000.

=== Route branding ===
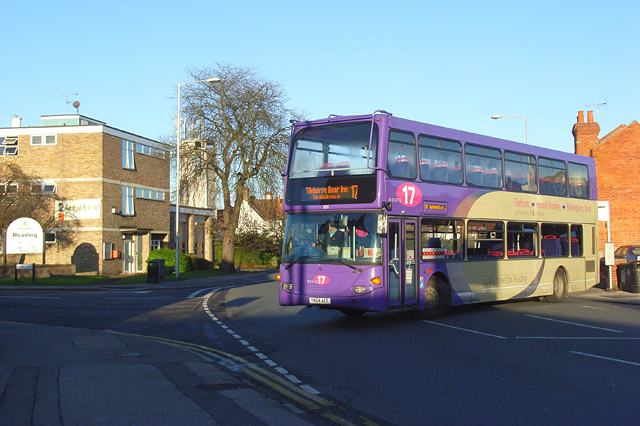
One of the original premier route 17 branded buses at the Three Tuns terminus in 2007

In 2004, Reading Buses introduced its first branded Premier Route in the form of the number 17, running between the Three Tuns on Wokingham Road and the Bear Inn at Tilehurst via the town centre and Oxford Road, and the linear descendant of the old main line. This was intended as the first in a series of such routes, each providing a weekday daytime frequency of between 3 and 8 buses per hour. Each premier route, or group of routes, would be allocated a distinctive colour, to be used on the buses on that route, and also on maps and other publicity.

Since then the premier route concept has been rolled out on most of Reading's urban routes. In April 2009, a similar concept was introduced to some of Reading Buses' longer distance rural routes. These were rebranded as Vitality Routes, using specially branded green and silver or red and silver buses. In 2014, these too were changed to a colour brand, becoming 'Lime Routes'. Most longer distance and interurban services now have animal related branding, with the lion to Bracknell and the leopard to Wokingham. The lime brand is still retained on the service to Mortimer.

=== Ethanol fuel controversy ===
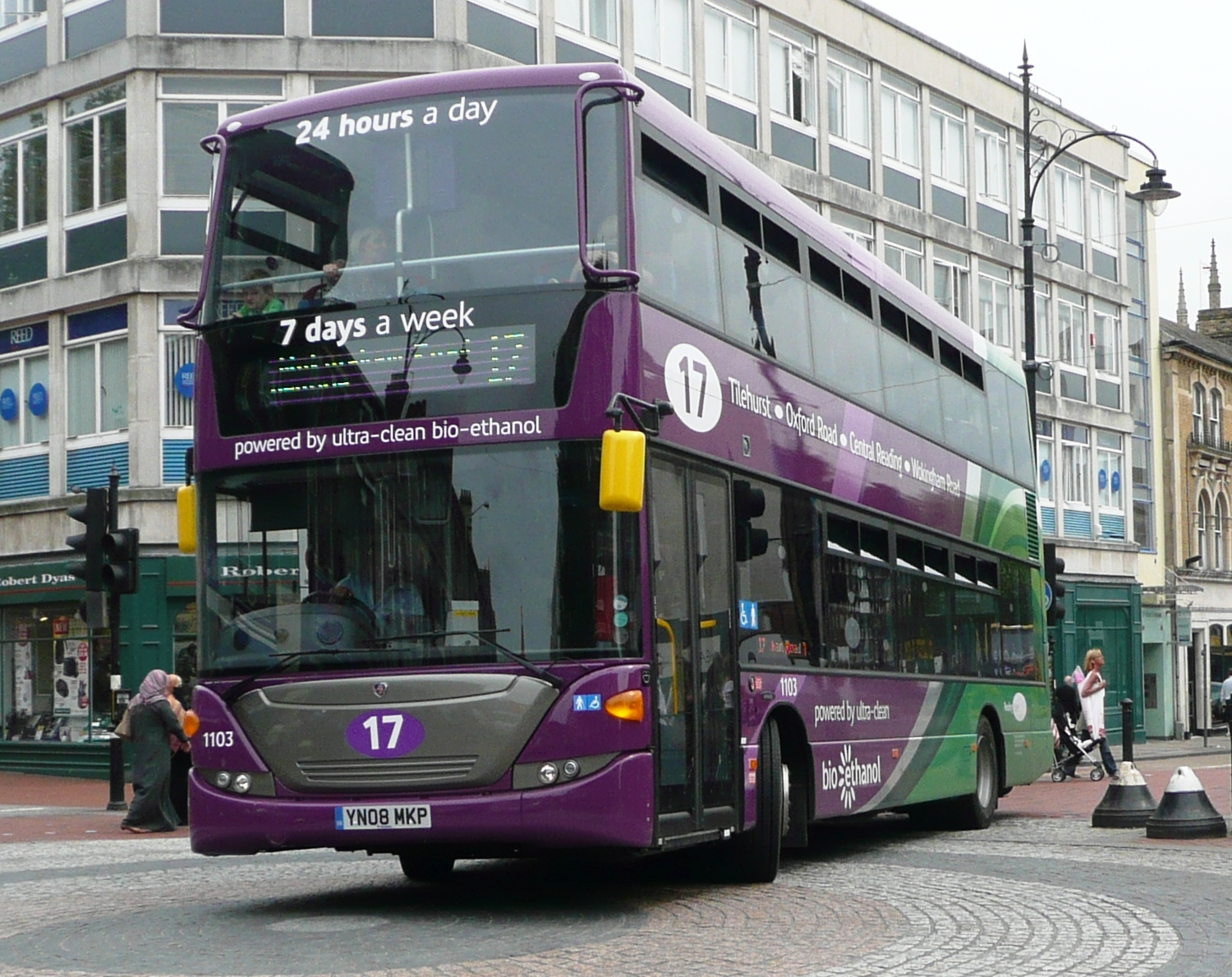
Ethanol-fueled Scania OmniCity in May 2008 in its route 17 colours

By 2008, all but one of Reading's bus fleet was fuelled by a mix of 5% biodiesel and 95% conventional diesel. In late 2007, Reading Buses placed an order with Scania for 14 ethanol-fuelled double decker buses to replace the existing fleet of biodiesel-powered vehicles operating premier route 17. At the time the order was placed, this was the largest order for ethanol-fuelled buses in the UK. These buses started work on 26 May 2008.

In October 2009, it was discovered that instead of the bio-ethanol fuel having been sourced from sugar beet grown in the English county of Norfolk (as had been advertised), it was actually made from wood pulp imported from Sweden. On learning this, Reading Borough councillors launched an investigation into how they and the Reading Transport Board could have been deceived. All the ethanol-powered buses were converted to run on the same bio-diesel mix as the rest of the fleet.

Reading Buses also had 31 hybrid electric Alexander Dennis Enviro400Hs delivered in 2010 and 2011, however none are now operated as hybrids. One Enviro400H was converted into an experimental battery electric bus in 2019, while the remaining buses were refurbished and converted to diesel power.

=== Move to biogas ===
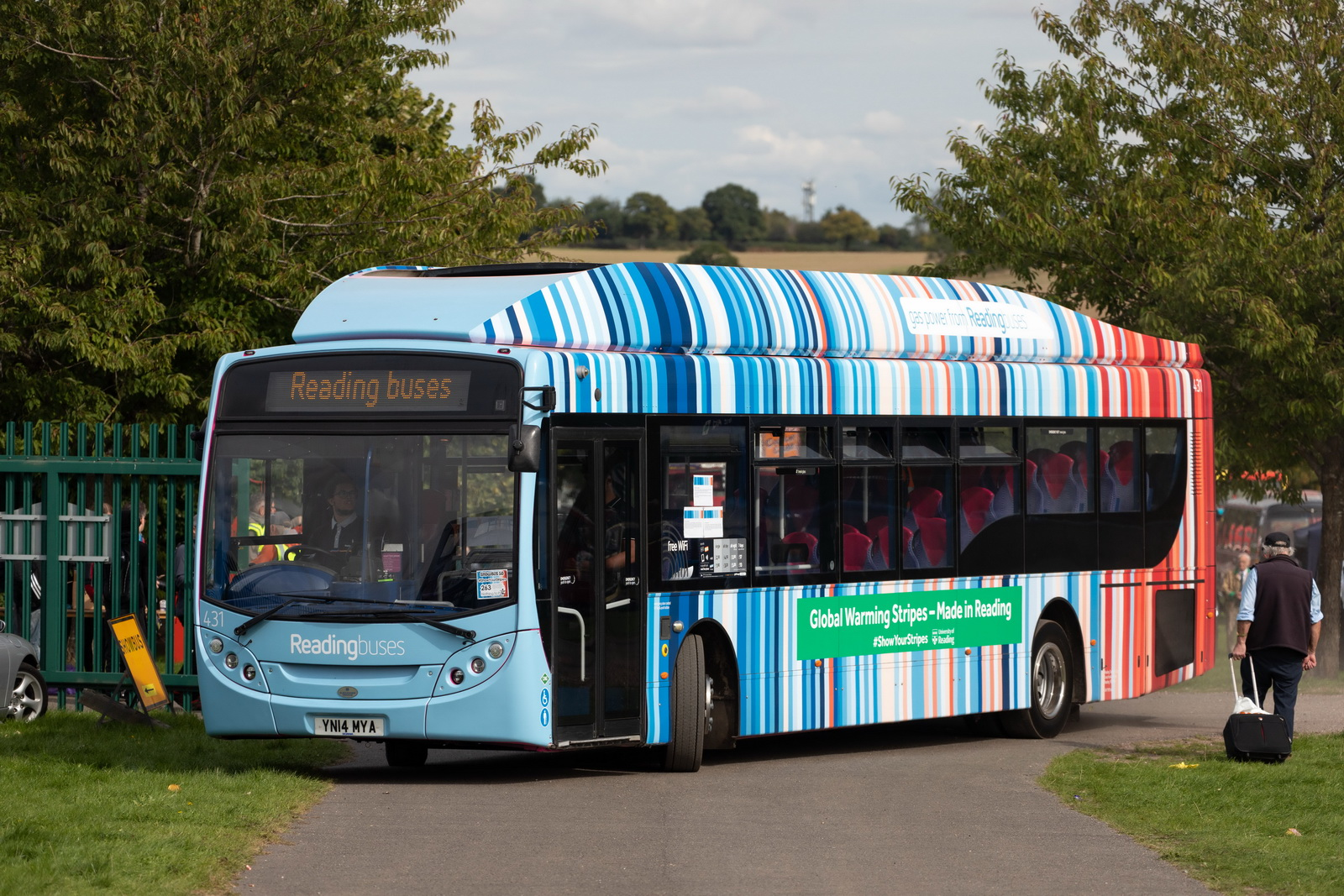
A Reading Buses bus in climate stripes

Following its relatively unsuccessful experiments with ethanol fuelled and hybrid buses, Reading Buses took the decision to switch to compressed natural gas (CNG) of biological origin. In May 2013, 20 single-deck buses powered by CNG were introduced. These were initially used on the Greenwave routes, Leopard 3/8/9, Tiger 7 and Bronze 11. A further 14 similar vehicles arrived in 2014, which work the Lime 2, Leopard 3/8/9 and Pink 22/25, with further buses being subsequently purchased.

One member of this fleet, No 420, holds the land speed record for a regular service bus, having achieved 80.82 mph under test conditions in May 2015. It carries a special cow print livery reflecting the fact that the compressed natural gas is, at source, methane derived from cow dung. Another, 431, carries a climate stripes derived livery to indicate its green credentials and to reflect the local origins of the climate stipes at the University of Reading.

In 2017, five CNG-fuelled Scania N280UDs with Alexander Dennis Enviro400 MMC bodywork, the world's first biogas-fuelled double-decker buses, were delivered to Reading Buses for use on the Royal Blue 33 route. One of these buses is named after Richard Wilding. A further 17 CNG-fuelled Scania N280UDs, these fitted with Enviro400 City bodies, arrived in 2018 for the Purple 17 service.

=== Expansion in the 2010s ===
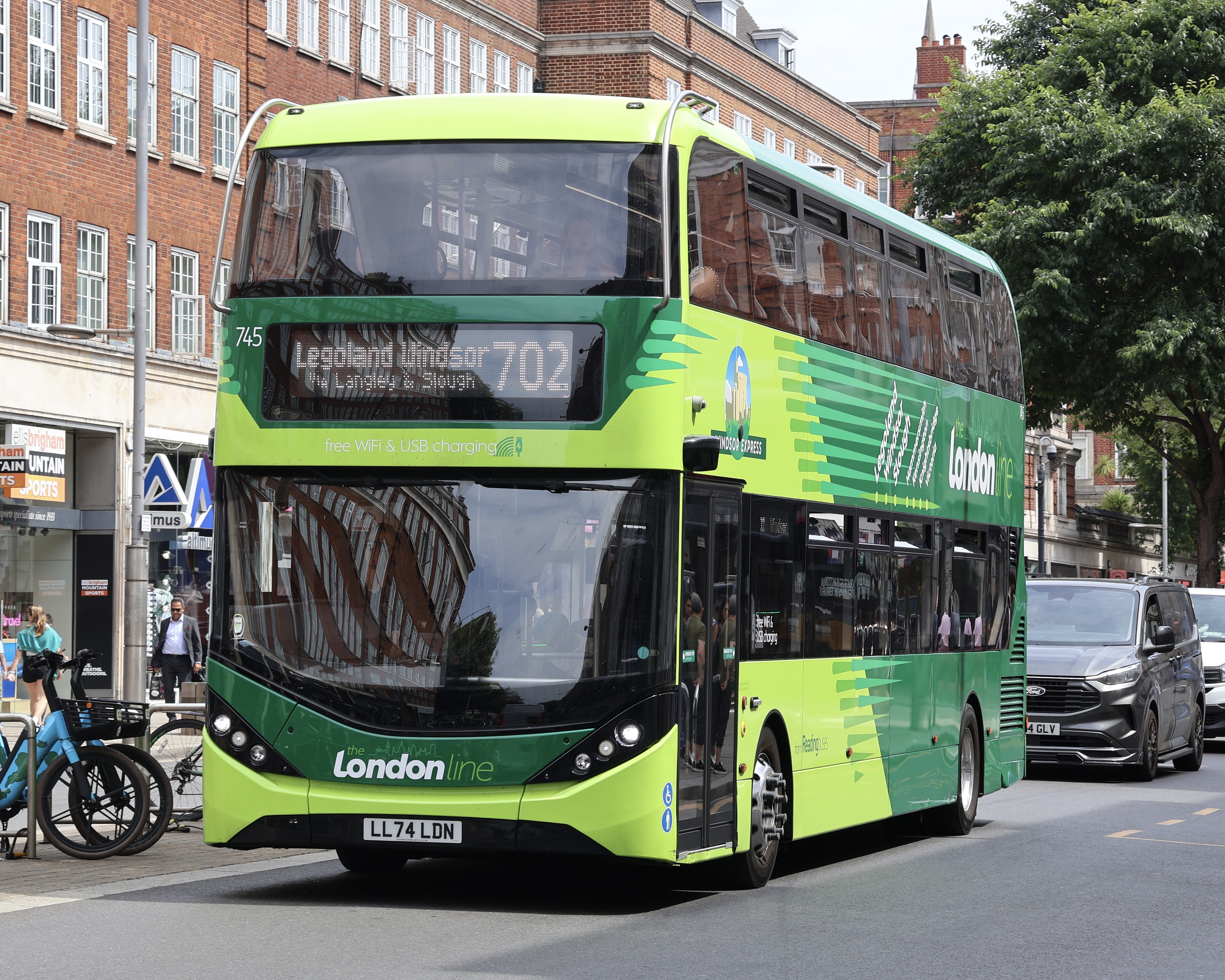
A route 702 bus near its London terminus at Victoria

In December 2017, Reading Buses started to serve London again when it took over Green Line Coaches route 702 from Bracknell to the Green Line Coach Station at Victoria via Windsor and Slough from First Berkshire. The service had a refreshed livery and was branded Green Line Express. In 2018 this was expanded to include the new route 703 between Bracknell and Heathrow.

Also in December 2017, it was announced that Reading Buses was to take on three services withdrawn by First Berkshire & The Thames Valley in the Slough area. A fourth route was later added. The Thames Valley Buses name, historically associated with Thames Valley Traction, was used for the new services. Operation began on 20 January 2018.

In September 2018, Reading Buses purchased Newbury & District from Weavaway. In March 2019, Courtney Buses was purchased, along with 57 buses and its route network in Bracknell, Maidenhead, Slough and Wokingham. Reading Buses existing routes in Slough were transferred to Courtney Buses, and that company adopted their Thames Valley Buses brand for all its services.

=== Expansion in the 2020s ===
With the delivery of new vehicles in June 2023, the Green Line Express brand was replaced with The London Line 702, and Flightline 703, the latter now co-branded with Heathrow Airport. The two routes are marketed together in Bracknell under the name Windsor Express which is shown prominently at the front of the buses. In addition, The London Line 701 was introduced to be the brand used on the 3 buses per day from Reading to Slough/Legoland in the early morning, with them making return trips in the late evening.

In January 2024, a new bus service, the buzz 9 was introduced to link Reading town centre and the newly opened Reading Green Park railway station via the Royal Berkshire Hospital, Whitley and the Green Park business park. This introduced the new buzz route branding intended to denote subsidised services provided by Reading Buses under contract to Reading Borough Council. In April 2024, this was joined by buzz 18, connecting Kenavon Drive in inner East Reading with Tilehurst Triangle via the town centre and Portman Road.

In June 2024, Reading Buses introduced a new bus service, the aqua 28, providing a service between Reading and Henley-on-Thames via Shiplake. This replaced a previous service on a similar but longer route, lost with the closure of Arriva's operations in High Wycombe and Aylesbury, but on a more frequent basis. In September 2024, Reading Buses introduced a new express bus service, the white knight 20, running non-stop between Reading town centre and the Whiteknights Campus of the University of Reading, strengthening the claret 21 that covers a similar routing with intermediate stops. In the same month, the azure 43 was introduced to replace the former Thames Travel 143 service to Pangbourne and Upper Basildon.

=== First battery-electric buses ===
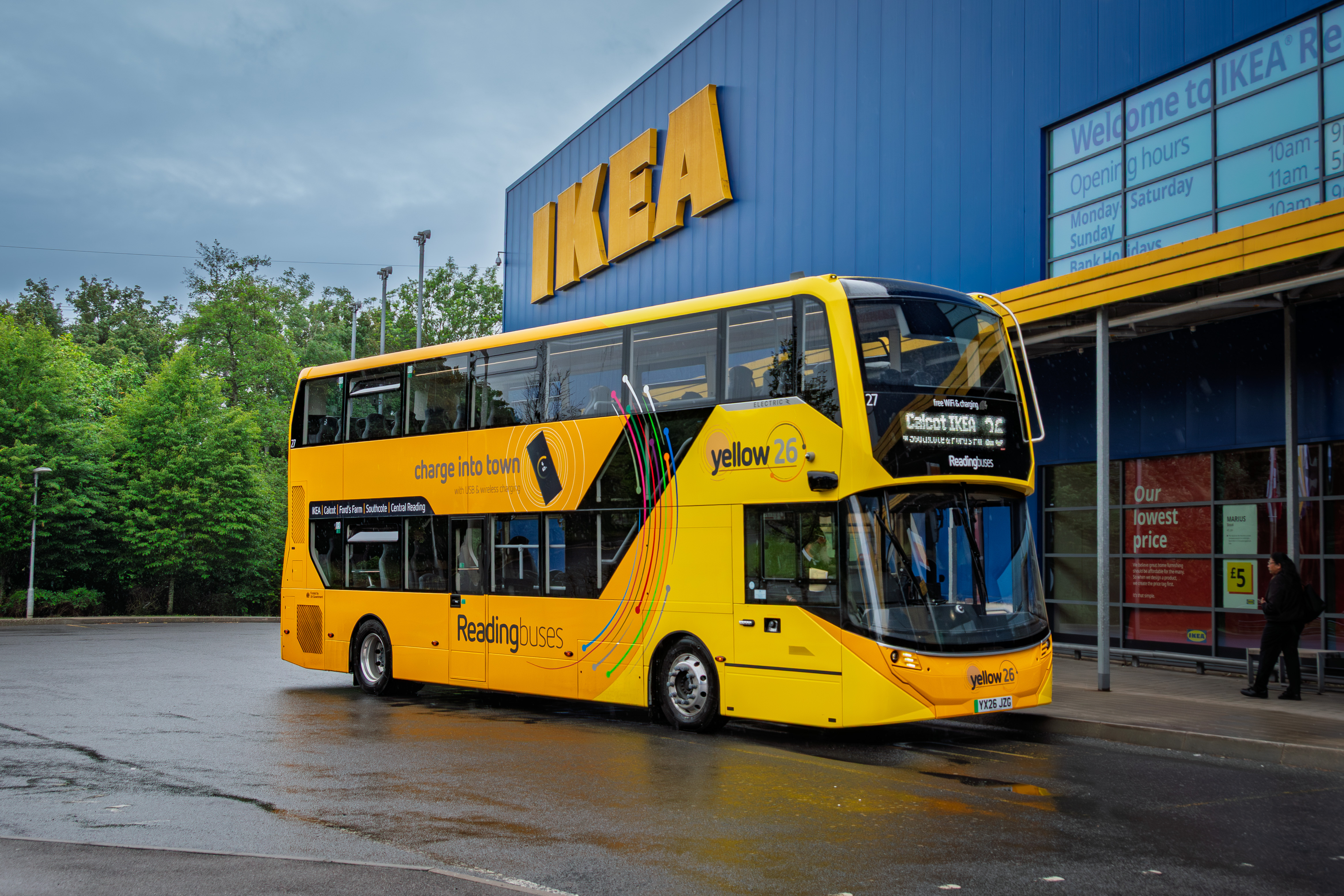
New battery-electric bus at IKEA

In February 2026, Reading Buses unveiled its first battery-electric fleet of 25 new Alexander Dennis Enviro400EV buses. These buses operate the purple 17 and claret 21 routes. A further eight new electric buses entered service on the yellow 26 route in summer 2026. Enviro400EV buses will also enter service on the emerald 5/6 routes in summer 2027, increasing the number of electric buses to 49.

Some of double-deck biogas buses that previously operated on route 17 have been refurbished and displaced diesel buses on routes 15 and 16 in May 2026. The remaining buses have been refurbished in order to displace diesel buses from routes 23 and 24.

=== Route 22 withdrawal ===
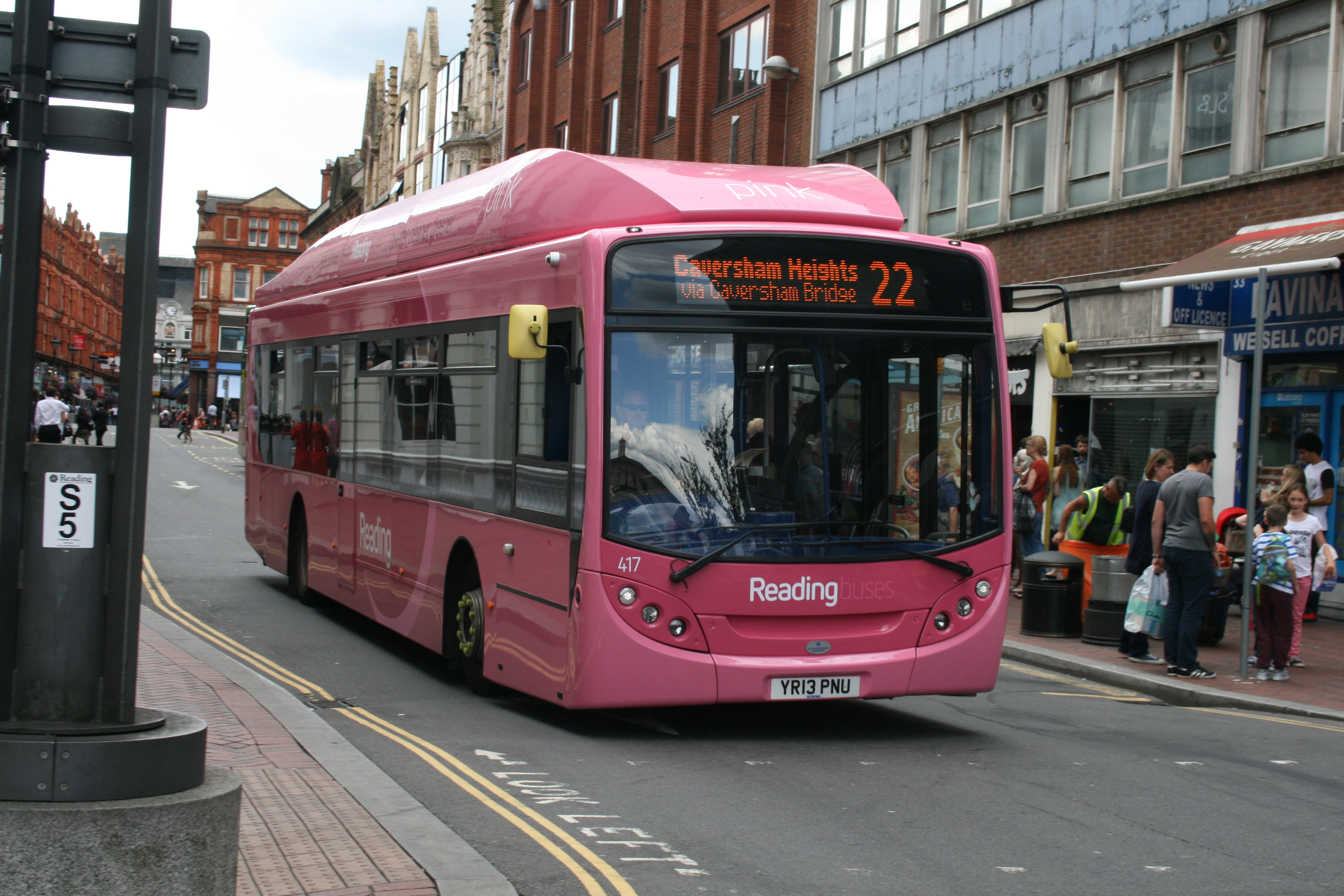
Bus on route 22

On 5 June 2026, Reading Buses announced that its long-standing pink 22 route would be withdrawn, leaving a considerable area of Caversham Heights without any bus service beyond school buses. It was stated that this action was taken because the route was no longer commercially viable, due to a poor recovery from the COVID-19 pandemic, exacerbated by extensive road closures in Caversham, competition on other sections of the route, and rising costs.

The announcement was met with opposition from local residents and councillors. Whilst Reading Buses is owned by Reading Borough Council, it is operated as an arms-length company, as required by the Transport Act 1985, and cannot therefore directly subsidise loss-making services itself. However councils can subsidise services, and as Reading Borough already does this for the buzz 9 and 18 services, questions were asked as to why this could not be done for the 22.

However, on Wednesday 15th July 2026, Reading Borough Council announced that the pink 22 route had been saved from withdrawal due to additional funding from the UK Government's Z.E.B.R.A. electric buses program. The route is set to be operated by an electric bus in the coming months.

== Current Routes ==
=== Reading Buses ===
Reading Transport operates public service buses under the Reading Buses brand throughout the town of Reading, in the adjoining area, and along a number of corridors out to other local towns. Each route, or in some cases group of routes, has its own sub-brand, with a name and colour scheme. The name and colour scheme is used on the buses used on that route, and also on maps and other publicity.

The principal routes operated by Reading Buses are listed here. Infrequent, school and special services are omitted; routes 701-703 are covered separately below. The frequencies quoted are for weekday daytimes, and services are less frequent in the evening and on weekends. Unless otherwise stated, these services are operated on a commercial basis, with all operation costs met from fare-box revenue.

Route	Serves	Notes
jet black 1	Reading – Calcot – Theale – Aldermaston – Woolhampton – Thatcham – Newbury	Two buses per hour
lime 2/2a	Reading – Burghfield – Burghfield Common – Mortimer – ( Aldermaston )	Two buses per hour; serves Aldermaston at peak periods only
leopard 3	Reading – Royal Berkshire Hospital – Shinfield – ( Arborfield – Arborfield Green – Finchampstead – Barkham – Wokingham )	Four buses per hour; alternate buses serve Wokingham; subsidised by Wokingham Borough Council
lion 4/4a	Reading – Cemetery Junction – Three Tuns – Winnersh – Wokingham – ( Great Hollands ) – Bracknell	Four buses per hour; alternate buses serve Great Hollands
emerald 5	Reading – Northumberland Avenue – Whitley	Five buses per hour
emerald 6/6a	Reading – Basingstoke Road – (Tesco depot) – Whitley Wood	Five buses per hour; serves Tesco depot at shift change times only
buzz 9/9a/9b	Reading – Royal Berkshire Hospital – Whitley Wood – Green Park – Green Park station	Hourly; subsidised by Reading Borough Council
bronze 11	Reading – Coley Park	Three buses per hour
orange 13	Reading – Cemetery Junction – Bulmershe – Loddon Bridge Road – Woodley – Cemetery Junction – Reading	Circular service; anti-clockwise equivalent of route 14; two buses per hour
orange 14	Reading – Cemetery Junction – Woodley – Loddon Bridge Road – Bulmershe – Cemetery Junction – Reading	Circular service; clockwise equivalent of route 13; two buses per hour
sky blue 15/15a	Reading – Oxford Road – Dee Road – Tilehurst Triangle – ( Calcot – Theale )	Three buses per hour to Tilehurst; one per hour through to Theale
sky blue 16	Reading – Oxford Road – Norcot Junction – Kentwood Circle – Denefield School – Purley	Three buses per hour
purple 17	Three Tuns – Cemetery Junction – Reading – Oxford Road – Norcot Junction – Tilehurst Triangle – Water Tower	Six to eight buses per hour
buzz 18	Kenavon Drive – Reading – Caversham Bridge – Portman Road – Norcot Junction – Kentwood Circle – Tilehurst Triangle	Two buses per hour; subsidised by Reading Borough Council
little oranges 19a	Reading – Royal Berkshire Hospital – Earley Gate – Silverdale Road – Woodley – Earley Gate – Royal Berkshire Hospital – Reading	Circular service; anti-clockwise equivalent of route 19c; one bus per hour; subsidised by Wokingham Borough Council
little oranges 19b	Reading – Royal Berkshire Hospital – Earley Gate – Beech Lane – Lower Earley ASDA	One bus per hour; subsidised by Wokingham Borough Council
little oranges 19c	Reading – Royal Berkshire Hospital – Earley Gate – Woodley – Silverdale Road – Earley Gate – Royal Berkshire Hospital – Reading	Circular service; clockwise equivalent of route 19a; one bus per hour; subsidised by Wokingham Borough Council
white knight 20	Reading – Whiteknights Campus (UoR)	Four buses per hour; runs non-stop between the town centre and the University of Reading; term time only
claret 21	Reading – Kendrick Road – Whiteknights Campus (UoR) – Lower Earley ASDA – Rushey Way	Three buses per hour
pink 22	Reading – Caversham Bridge – Caversham – Kidmore Road – Highmoor Road – Caversham – Caversham Bridge – Reading	Circular service; anti-clockwise only; one bus per 45 minutes
berry 23	Reading – Caversham Bridge – Caversham – Caversham Park – Emmer Green – Caversham – Caversham Bridge – Reading	Circular service; anti-clockwise equivalent of 24; two buses per hour
berry 24	Reading – Caversham Bridge – Caversham – Emmer Green – Caversham Park – Caversham – Caversham Bridge – Reading	Circular service; clockwise equivalent of 23; two buses per hour
pink 25/25a	Reading – Reading Bridge – Caversham – Emmer Green – Sonning Common – ( Peppard Common )	Two buses per hour; one or two buses per hour continue to Peppard Common; subsidised by Oxfordshire County Council
yellow 26	Reading – Southcote – Fords Farm – Calcot – ( IKEA )	Four buses per hour; buses serve IKEA during store opening hours only
aqua 28/28a	Reading – Caversham Bridge – Caversham – Playhatch – ( Binfield Heath ) – Shiplake – Henley	Two buses per hour; four or five buses per day operate via Binfield Heath
little berry 29/29a	Reading – ( Reading Bridge / Caversham Bridge – Caversham ) – Lower Caversham	Two buses per hour; most buses operate via Reading Bridge; some inbound buses via Caversham and Caversham Bridge
royal blue 33	Reading – Tilehurst Road – Corwen Road – Tilehurst Triangle – Pierces Hill – Little Heath Road – Turnham's Farm	Three buses per hour
azure 43	Reading – Oxford Road – Norcot Junction – Kentwood Circle – Purley – Pangbourne – Upper Basildon	Five buses per day; a sixth one operates during school term times only, subsidised by West Berkshire Council
greenwave 50/50a	Reading – ( Kennet Island ) – Green Park	Four buses per hour; alternate buses operate via Kennet Island
Hospital P&R; 300	Mereoak P&R – Royal Berkshire Hospital – Thames Valley P&R	Two buses per hour
Winnersh P&R; 500	Reading – Cemetery Junction – Winnersh P&R	Four buses per hour; subsidised by Reading and Wokingham Borough Councils
Mereoak P&R; 600	Reading – Mereoak P&R – ( Three Mile Cross – Spencers Wood – Swallowfield – Riseley / TVSP )	Four buses per hour; one per hour continues to each of Riseley and TVSP; subsidised by Reading and Wokingham Borough Councils

=== Newbury & District ===
Newbury & District Ltd, a subsidiary company of Reading Transport, operates services using the Newbury & District brand in the Newbury and West Berkshire area.

The operated services include:

- 1a/1c circulars between Newbury Wharf and Thatcham Broadway.
- 1d to Thatcham Broadway.
- 2/2a/2c to Wash Common, Tesco Superstore and Pigeons Farm.
- 3/3a/3c/3x to Hungerford.
- 4/4a/4b/4c to Speen and Lambourn.
- 6/6a to East & West Ilsley.
- 8 to Tesco Superstore and Pigeons Farm.
- 9/9b/9c to Newbury Racecourse, Tesco Superstore and Pigeons Farm.
- 103/103a/b/c to the Greenham Business Park and Tesco Superstore.
- V1 shuttle service between Newbury Rail Station and the Vodafone Campus.
- 730/731 between Basingstoke, Frimley and Heathrow.

All services (except 3c, which continues to Thatcham Broadway) serve the Newbury Wharf Bus Station.

The 1a/c/d, 103/103a/b/c, 730/731 and V1 services are operated solely by Reading Buses. All other routes are operated on behalf of West Berkshire Council.

=== Thames Valley Buses ===
Thames Valley Buses Ltd, a subsidiary company of Reading Transport, operates services using the Thames Valley Buses brand in the Bracknell, Maidenhead, Slough and Wokingham area.

=== The London Line 701/702 and Flightline 703 ===
The London Line 701/702 and Flightline 703 are a series of bus routes that connect the Berkshire towns of Bracknell, Reading, Slough and Windsor with London and Heathrow Airport. The routes have a history dating back to the 1920s, and have been operated by a number of operators under different route names and numbers over that time. Currently these routes are either operated directly by Reading Buses (routes 701 and 702) or by the Thames Valley Buses subsidiary (route 703).

=== Flightline 730/731 ===
On 21 August 2023, Newbury & District commenced operations on the new Flightline 730/731 route between Basingstoke, Frimley, Camberley and Heathrow.

== Obsolete brands ==
=== Newbury Buses ===

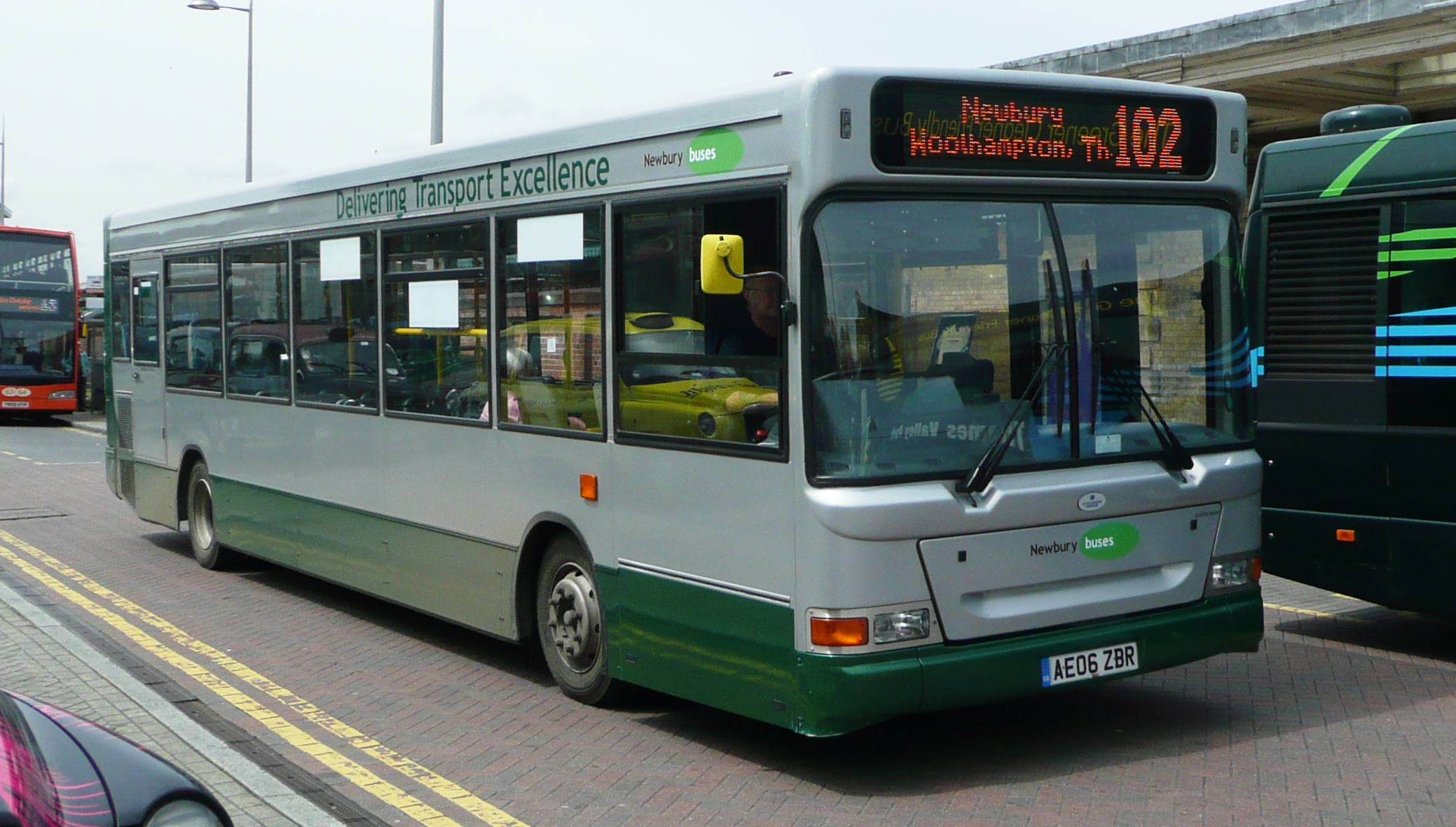
Newbury Buses Dennis Dart, pre "Newbury & District" competition

Until August 2011, Reading Transport operated public service buses in the town of Newbury and the surrounding rural area under the "Newbury Buses" brand. Two routes were branded using the same Vitality Route brand that was used by Reading Buses, and provide weekday daytime frequencies of two buses per hour. Another longer distance route, to Basingstoke, was jointly operated with Stagecoach in Hampshire and branded as The Link.

When Reading withdrew from all commercial and tendered work in the Newbury area, the majority of work passed to Newbury & District. The Link is now operated by Stagecoach in Hampshire on a revised timetable to reflect the Stagecoach depot being in Basingstoke.

Jet Black 1 was subcontracted to Weavaway Travel in 2011, using several Alexander Dennis Enviro400s, which were owned by Weavaway but in a route-branded version of the Reading Buses livery and on the Reading fleet system. Additional Enviro400s owned by Weavaway in an all-over black livery were also able to be used on the route.

=== Goldline Travel ===
Goldline logo

Reading Buses used the Goldline Travel name for its non-public-service bus operations, including services operated under contract for various local employers. Goldline Travel was also responsible for the operation of Fastrack and Daytrack park and ride services and Nighttrack night bus services, all of which are operated under contract to Reading Borough Council.

Goldline Travel had a two-tone green colour scheme, although most services were operated by vehicles in colour schemes specified by the contracting organisation. Unlike services run by Reading Buses, Goldline gave change on their routes. This was mainly for the benefit of visitors who are more likely to use routes such as park-and-ride.

In May 2008, Goldline won the contract to operate route 142 from Checkendon, Woodcote and Purley to Reading; the route was previously operated by Thames Travel. However, when the route was next tendered, in May 2012, the contract reverted to Thames Travel.

In February 2009, the private hire services run by Goldline ceased, and the coaches were all sold.

=== Loddon Bridge Park & Ride ===
In 2015, Loddon Bridge Park & Ride route 500 ceased and the site was closed, having been superseded by Winnersh Triangle Park & Ride, following the completion of the new site by Reading and Wokingham Borough Councils.

=== Kennections ===
Following a contract win from West Berkshire Council, Reading Buses introduced the Kennections brand in Newbury in September 2016. These routes were previously run by Newbury & District, the bus service trading name for Weavaway Travel, who in turn took them over from Reading Buses' now-defunct Newbury Buses brand. All drivers were TUPEd to Reading Buses.

In April 2020, Kennections was merged into Newbury & District, with the latter name being retained. The app was also changed to Newbury & District in September of that year.

=== Courtney Buses ===
In March 2019, Reading Buses purchased Courtney Buses as part of their expansion across Berkshire.

Between November 2019 and April 2021, the Courtney Buses brand began to be phased out.

=== National Express ===
Reading Buses formerly operated the 925 route between Woking and Heathrow, but this contract was suspended with the onset on the coronavirus pandemic.

Newbury & District also operated two routes, the 402 and select trips of the 507. Two coaches were maintained by N&D during the operation at their Greenham Park depot. The 402 was introduced in early 2023 to make use of otherwise dead (Out of Service) runs between London and Newbury.

The operation of theses services by N&D ended in late 2023, with the 402 being withdrawn completely, and the two coaches being returned to NatEx.

== Fleet ==
As of April 2025, the Reading Buses fleet consists of 173 buses, with a further 75 buses operated by subsidiary companies.

== Charities and Open Days ==
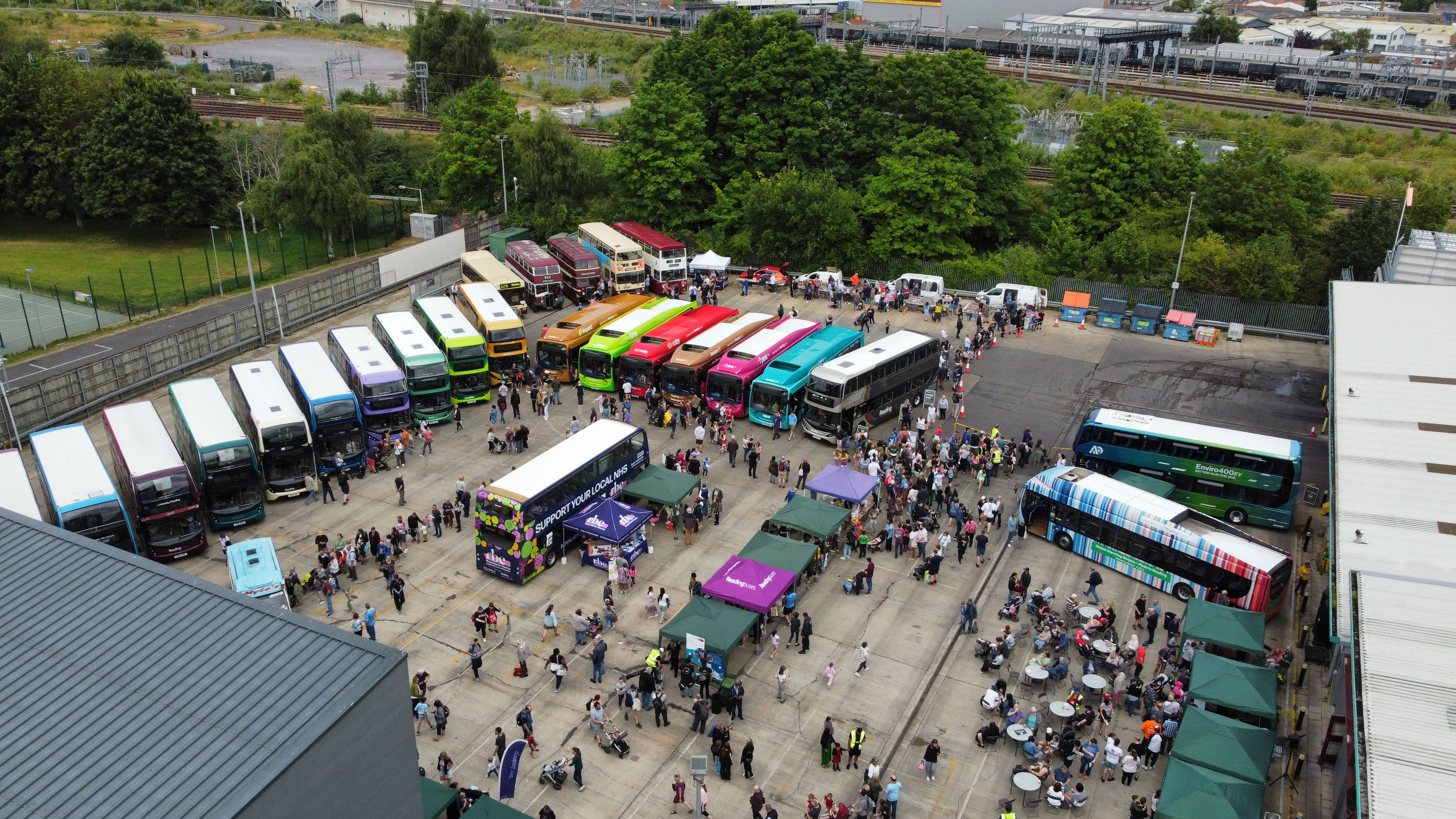
Reading Buses open day in 2024, illustrating the many route colours in use

Each year, Reading Buses partners with a charity of the year. The charity selected receives dedicated advertising space on one of the company's buses. Additionally the company runs an annual open day, when the public are welcomed into their Great Knollys Street depot, with a wide range of stalls, activities, food and behind-the-scenes tours. All funds raised on the open day go to the charity of the year.

The 2026 open day was held on Sunday 28th June, and the charity of the year for 2026 is Berkshire Search and Rescue Dogs. Previous charities include Royal Berks Charity, Cancer Research UK, Red Balloon Learner Centres, Campaign Against Living Miserably, Alzheimer's Society, Help for Heroes, Thames Valley Air Ambulance and Macmillan Cancer Support. Since 2008, over £143,000 has been raised.
