= Trolleybuses in Reading =

Former trolleybus system

Reading trolleybus system
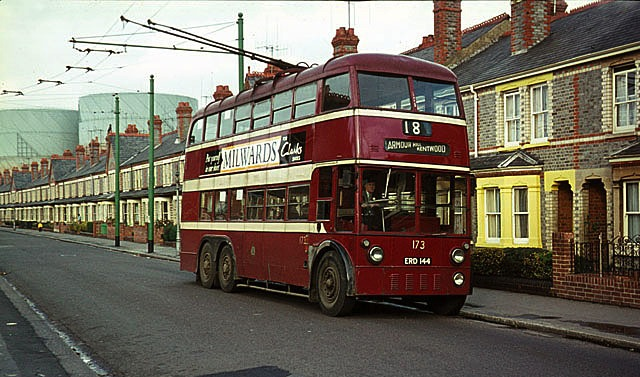
- Park Royal bodied Sunbeam S7 at the Liverpool Road terminus of the London Road route, October 1965

Operation
- Locale: Reading, Berkshire, England
- Open: 18 July 1936
- Close: 3 November 1968
- Status: Closed
- Routes: 4
- Operator: Reading Corporation

Infrastructure
- Stock: 93, including six bought second hand and never used; 63 maximum in service

The Reading trolleybus system served the town of Reading in the English county of Berkshire and was owned by Reading Corporation, which had operated an electric tramway since 1901. As there was a need for major refurbishment of the tramway in the 1930s, they decided to replace it with a trolleybus network. The first route was converted on 18 July 1936, and by mid 1939, trolleybuses were running over most of the tramway routes, with the last tram running on 20 May. By the standards of the various now-defunct trolleybus systems in the United Kingdom, the Reading system was a moderately sized one, with a total of four routes, and a maximum fleet of 63 trolleybuses, a size that lasted from 1 December 1950 to 27 March 1952.

Reading saw a large increase in population during the Second World War, and extra vehicles were obtained to meet the demands for transport. During this period, all of the termini were given new non-geographical names, in case there was an invasion, but most were reverted when hostilities ceased. In the post-war period, small extensions to the system continued to be made, and although a batch of second-hand trolleybuses were purchased in 1949, most acquisitions were new, with a final batch of twelve obtained from Sunbeam Commercial Vehicles in 1961. The demise of the system was hastened by the manufacturer of overhead wiring announcing that they would cease production of these items, and by some major roadworks taking place in the town, which would have required reconstruction of the overhead wiring. The first closure of a route took place in July 1965, and the system closed on 3 November 1968.

Reading was at the forefront of the trolleybus preservation movement, when Reading Transport Society obtained the first British trolleybus to be privately preserved. Another five Reading vehicles were eventually saved, including one that was sold to Teesside for further service when the Reading system closed. The Reading Transport Society spent years searching for a site where their vehicles could be exhibited and operated, and were instrumental in setting up The Trolleybus Museum at Sandtoft in 1969, where all of the preserved vehicles are normally stored. The Society was rebranded as the British Trolleybus Society in 1971, reflecting the wider remit that they now had.

== History ==
Reading Corporation had run an electric tramway network since 1 November 1901, and by the 1930s the tramcars were showing their age, as the fleet still consisted of the 30 vehicles that had been bought for the opening of the system and another six that had been acquired a year later, although many had been fitted with new bodywork at the Mill Lane depot in the 1920s. In 1931 a Tramways (Future Policy) Subcommittee was created, to consider what should be done when replacement of the tramcars became necessary. Formal visits were made to see several trolleybus systems, and the committee proposed a trolleybus network as the solution. As they were already promoting a bill in Parliament to authorise the supply of electricity, the initial plan to obtain powers to convert the Caversham Bridge to Whitley Wood route became a more general request to cover the conversion of all the tram routes, and these powers were enshrined in the Reading Corporation Act 1935 (25 & 26 Geo. 5. c. xc).

Trams on the route along Erleigh Road had been withdrawn on 7 August 1932, to be replaced by motorbuses, The overhead wiring on part of the route was altered for trolleybuses, and a Sunbeam demonstrator was obtained in May 1936 to allow driver training to take place. The vehicle was fitted with a skate to allow it to run under the tramway wires between the depot and the test track, and although there was never a public trolleybus service on the Erleigh Road route, passengers were often carried free of charge during this period to provide a taster for the new mode of transport. Trams were withdrawn from the Caversham to Whitley Street route on 15 July 1936, to be temporarily replaced by motor buses while the conversion of the overhead wiring was completed. A formal opening took place on 18 July, with the Mayor driving the Sunbeam demonstrator, now No.1 in the corporation's fleet. The other five vehicles obtained to provide the service were an eclectic mix, with one each from Associated Equipment Company (AEC) of Southall, Guy Motors of Wolverhampton, Leyland Motors of Leyland, Ransomes, Sims & Jefferies of Ipswich, and another Sunbeam. All had lowbridge bodywork by Park Royal Vehicles, with 50 seats on the demonstrator and 52 seats on the rest.

The different makes of trolleybus were assessed, and an order was placed with AEC for 25 vehicles to enable the rest of the trams to be withdrawn. These were of highbridge design, with a central gangway on the top deck, rather than the offset sunken gangway of the lowbridge design. Because a highbridge design is inherently taller than a lowbridge vehicle, the corporation had to obtain a special dispensation from the Ministry of Transport, as low bridges on Caversham Road and Oxford Road meant that the overhead wires were very close to the roof at these locations. As well as the price being competitive, AEC had the advantage that their works were only 27 miles (43 km) away. Delivery of the first vehicle occurred on 14 December 1938, and the final one arrived on 18 April 1939. New overhead wiring was erected, and where possible, the tramway wiring was removed, with the trams using one of the trolley wires to obtain their power. The "main line" tramway route ran from Oxford Road, near its junction with Craig Avenue in the west, to Wokingham Road in the east, with a branch to London Road. The trolleybus route would be somewhat longer, with an extension along Wokingham Road to the "Three Tuns" public house at one end, and a longer extension to "The Bear" public house in Tilehurst at the other. Driver training took place at the Tilehurst end, where there was no conflict with the trams, and the final trams ran on 20 May 1939, bringing 38 years of tramway operation to an end. Trolleybuses ran along the extended route on the following day.

The onset of the Second World War brought its own problems, with Reading seeing a rapid increase in population, from 100,000 to 140,000 in just two years, and corresponding increases in the number of passengers trying to use the system. Attempts to hire surplus trolleybuses or motor buses from other operators failed, but in 1942 an order was placed with Sunbeam for six utility-bodied vehicles, which arrived in 1943. All of the termini were renamed to remove geographical information, in case of invasion, with Caversham becoming Promenade, Whitley becoming Whit Pump, Tilehurst becoming Bear Inn, Wokingham Road becoming Three Tuns, and London Road becoming Liverpool Road. When hostilities ceased, all but Liverpool Road reverted to their pre-war names. On 31 July 1944 a new branch was opened from Oxford Road to Kentwood, enabling trolleybuses to replace motor buses with a consequential saving in precious oil based fuel.

In 1949 the Whitley Street line was extended along Northumberland Avenue on 5 June, with a branch to Whitley Wood and a short branch to Reading General station opening on 7 August. Subsequent short extensions took the system to its full extent, with the Kentwood route running to Armour Hill and the Northumberland Avenue line running to the junction with Whitley Wood Road. Services on the extended system were provided by purchasing twelve three-axle Karriers from the Huddersfield system, although only six were used in public service, and a batch of 20 vehicles from British United Traction with air-operated doors on the rear platform were delivered in 1950. The final additions to the fleet were twelve Sunbeams with front entrances, which arrived in 1961.

=== Demise ===
By 1965, many UK trolleybus systems had closed, and there were just 16 still in operation. The main manufacturer of the overhead equipment and wiring for trolleybus systems, British Insulated Callender's Cables, gave notice that they would cease production by the end of the year, because of difficulties in making the wire in sufficient quantities for it to be economic. At the same time the trolleybuses came in for some bad publicity in the local press because they cost more to operate compared to motor buses and they were inflexible, even though the trolleybuses were profitable (Reading's motor buses made a loss), faster and less polluting. Reading Corporation decided to abandon the trolleybus system, and the routes were phased out between July 1965 and November 1968.

The first route to close was the Caversham Bridge section, on 10 July 1965. At the same time, the wiring allowing the trolleybuses to serve the Stations was altered, in preparation for the introduction of a one-way system in the area. The decision to abandon the system was taken at a Council meeting on 26 July 1966, and large-scale closure began on 8 January 1967, when services on the Whitley Wood branch were withdrawn. Next to go were the route to Northumberland Avenue and the branch to the stations, which ceased on 31 December 1967. The Liverpool Road and Armour Hill branches closed on 3 March 1968, leaving just the main line from Tilehurst to Wokingham Road, which lasted until 3 November 1968, with trolleybus No.144 making the final ceremonial trip.

The UK's first contra-flow bus lane was instigated along Kings Road, when that road was made one-way in the early 1960s. The trolleybuses continued to operate two-way, as it was considered uneconomic to erect wiring on the new inbound route, London Road. The concept of the contra-flow bus lane proved successful, and was adopted in other places for motor buses. The extended main line from the Three Tuns to the Bear still exists today as Reading Buses route 17, the town's busiest and most frequent route, and the first to be designated a premier route. This was a scheme to upgrade the quality and level of service, including better provision for passengers with reduced mobility, realtime service information, and a higher capacity, more reliable bus service. This standard was rolled out on route 17 in 2004.

=== Depots ===
The Corporation owned a tram depot on Mill Lane, near to where the north-south Caversham to Whitley Street route crossed the east-west Wokingham Road to Norcot route. The site also contained a power station equipped with three boilers and four steam engines, which could supply 400 kW at 500 volts for the trams. For the arrival of the trolleybuses, a new depot was constructed on the same site, and temporary tracks were laid to enable the trams to be parked in the adjacent motor bus depot. Wiring was erected along a small section of London Street and all of Mill Lane, to allow the vehicles to reach either of the main routes, but there was never a public service on the depot access wires. In order to supply power to the new overhead wiring, substations were constructed at Crescent Road on Wokingham Road, Catherine Street on Oxford Road, near the "Rex" Cinema at Norcot, and at Kentwood Hill in Tilehurst. Soon after trolleybus operation began, power was available from the national grid, and the Mill Lane power station was shut down in October 1936. The equipment was removed from the boiler house in 1941, and the building became the trolleybus maintenance workshop.

As the size of the trolleybus fleet grew, the Mill Lane depot was no longer big enough, and a new depot on Bennet Road was constructed. It was officially brought into use on 14 January 1952, but had been used to store vehicles for nearly two years prior to that. Two new substations were required for the extension to Whitley, and they were sited at the junctions of Basingstoke Road with Christchurch Gardens and Buckland Road. The Bennet Road depot was closed in 1958. After the ceremonial last trolleybus on 3 November 1968, the mayor switched off the power to the overhead wiring from Mill Lane, and the trolleybuses had all been towed away to Bennet Road by midnight. They were gradually disposed of, with the last vehicle at the site being No.188, which departed on 11 May 1969.

After closure of the system, the Mill Lane garage was used for motorbuses, but in 1998 the site was completely demolished to make way for the Inner Distribution Road and "The Oracle" shopping mall. Mill Lane itself also disappeared in the redevelopment. However, the huge stone sign that adorned the top of the power station was saved and built into the back wall of the cinema that forms part of the complex.

== Fleet ==
For the opening of the system, six vehicles were obtained from five manufacturers, in order to assess the capabilities of each. Of the two from Sunbeam, the first was a demonstrator, and was obtained because it allowed driver training to begin, whereas new vehicles had a longer lead time. The eclectic mix was matched by a similar mix of electrical equipment, but all had bodywork by Park Royal Vehicles, so looked similar externally. Having assessed the vehicles, that from AEC was placed first, with vehicle No.6 from Sunbeam in second place. When asked for tenders, both quoted the same price, and so the first large batch was obtained from AEC. The second batch was obtained to cope with increased traffic levels during the Second World War, and were probably Sunbeams, although Joyce et al. also call them Karriers. The difference is trivial, as they were essentially the same vehicle. The Karrier model W was built at the Wolverhampton factory of Sunbeam, and badged with a Sunbeam logo if the order was placed through Sunbeam's Wolverhampton office, or a Karrier logo if it was placed through Karrier's Luton office.

Reading's first 8-foot (2.4 m) wide trolleybuses were the 20 bought from British United Traction in 1949. They had 64 seats and were also the first to have air-operated doors on the rear platform. At a similar time, they purchased a batch of twelve three-axle Karriers from Huddersfield, which had been built in 1934. The General Manager was originally given permission to buy between five and ten of the vehicles, but obtained all twelve. Plans for them to enter service immediately could not be actioned, because of the poor condition of the vehicles, and a programme of rebuilding, using two of them for spares was started, although only six of them were eventually completed.

Higher capacity was a feature of the three-axle Sunbeam S7s bought in 1950, which had seating for 68 passengers. The final batch of twelve vehicles were model F4As from Sunbeam, which had two axles, but retained the higher seating capacity of the previous batch. These were the only new vehicles that Reading bought which did not have bodywork by Park Royal Vehicles, but instead, they went to HV Burlingham of Blackpool for the coachbuilding. In a departure from previous practice, they had a front entrances, and six of them re-used motors and electrical equipment from the AECs they were replacing, while the other six had new equipment supplied by British Thomson-Houston (BTH). When the system closed, five of those with BTH equipment, Nos.183 to 186 and 192, were sold on to Teesside, where No.186 became the final vehicle to operate on that system when it closed in 1971.

List of vehicles
Fleet numbers	Type	In service	Withdrawn	Chassis	Electrical equipment	Bodywork	Notes
1	2-axle	1936	1949	Sunbeam MF2A	BTH	Park Royal L24/26R	No.101 from 1938
2	2-axle	1936	1950	AEC 661T	English Electric	Park Royal L26/26R	No.102 from 1938
3	2-axle	1936	1949	Guy BT	Electric Construction Co	Park Royal L26/26R	No.103 from 1938
4	2-axle	1936	1949	Leyland TB4	GEC	Park Royal L26/26R	No.104 from 1938
5	2-axle	1936	1949	Ransomes	Crompton	Park Royal L26/26R	No.105 from 1938
6	2-axle	1936	1950	Sunbeam MF2A	BTH	Park Royal L26/26R	No.106 from 1938
107-131	2-axle	1939	1958-61	AEC 661T	English Electric	Park Royal H30/26R	
132-137	2-axle	1943	1950	Sunbeam W	English Electric	Park Royal UH30/26R	
138-157	2-axle	1949	By 1966-68	BUT 9611T	English Electric	Park Royal H30/26R	
158-169	3-axle	1948-51	1955-56	Karrier E6	MetroVick	Brush H34/30R	
170-181	3-axle	1950	By 1967-68	Sunbeam S7	BTH	Park Royal H38/30R	
182-193	2-axle	1961	1968	Sunbeam F4A	BTH	HV Burlingham H38/30F	

Bus bodywork designations: key
Prefixes

U	Wartime utility bodywork
B	Bus body single deck
C	Coach body single deck
D	Dual purpose single deck
H	Highbridge body, central upper gangway
L	Lowbridge body, offset sunken upper gangway

Numbers

n	Single deck or total seating
x / y	Upper deck followed by lower deck seating

Suffixes

C	Centre entrance
F	Front entrance
R	Rear entrance
D	Dual entrance

=== Preservation ===
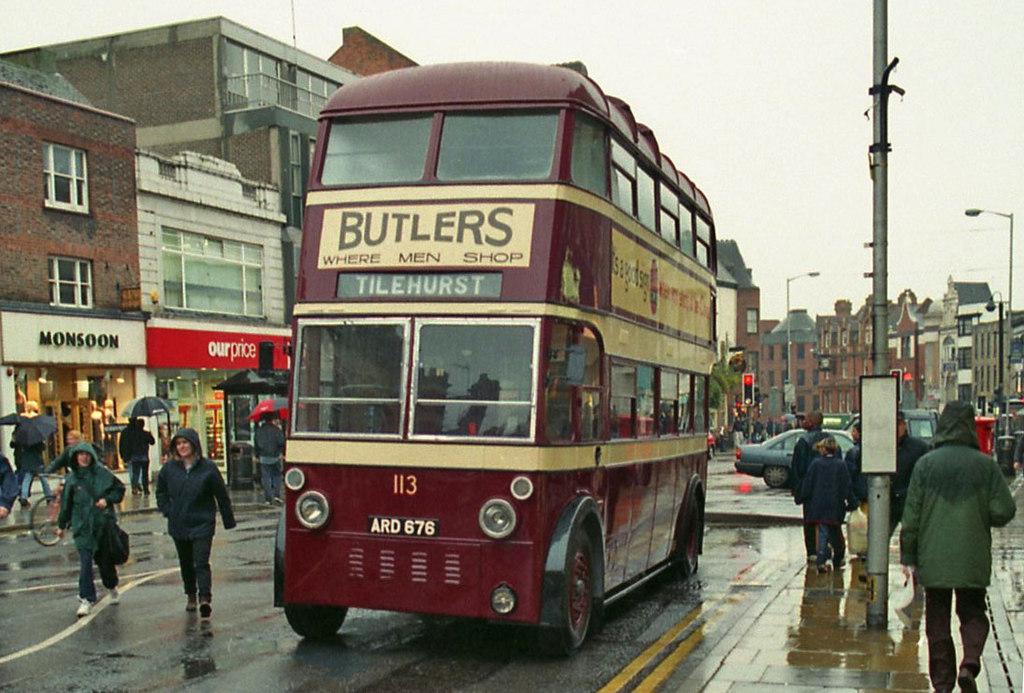
Preserved AEC 661T trolleybus 113 on its old route on Reading's Broad Street in October 1998

Six of the former Reading trolleybuses are now preserved. The Reading Transport Society was formed in April 1961 when 14 enthusiasts decided it was worth trying to save one of the AEC vehicles due to be withdrawn later that year. When they managed to do so in September, No.113 became the first privately preserved trolleybus in Britain. Although intended to be a local society, membership spiralled rapidly, attracting members from all over Britain. By 1964 they owned three other trolleybuses, and began searching for a permanent site where they could be displayed. Working with other societies, part of a former airfield at Sandtoft, near Doncaster, was purchased in 1969, and the Trolleybus Museum at Sandtoft was formed. Reading No.193 was the first trolleybus to move to the site in November 1969. The Reading Transport Society was renamed the British Trolleybus Society on 29 April 1971, exactly ten years after it was set up to purchase No.113, and all of the Reading trolleybuses in preservation are normally stored at the Sandtoft site.

- No.113, an AEC dating from 1939, became the first trolleybus in the United Kingdom to be preserved privately when Reading Transport Society acquired it in 1961, following withdrawal. This acquisition started the trolleybus preservation movement in Britain. Reading Transport Society did not have adequate facilities at the time, and it was stored in the open for ten years, during which time the bodywork deteriorated badly. In 1971 it was moved to Doncaster and stored under cover until restoration began in 1998. This was completed in May 1999, and it has regularly run on public open days at Sandtoft since then.
- No.144 was one of a batch of 20 BUT vehicles dating from 1949, which were the first 8-foot (2.4 m) wide vehicles to operate in Reading, and also the first to have air-operated doors on the rear platform. It remained in service until the system closed, and became the official last trolleybus on 3 November 1968. It returned to Reading in 1976 for Reading Transport's 75th Anniversary event, and operated sporadically at Sandtoft for events commemorating Reading anniversaries. Following the death of its owner Mike Dare in September 2005, ownership passed to the Trolleybus Museum at Sandtoft, where it is used regularly.
- No.174 and No.181 were two of a batch of 12 Sunbeam S7s, with three axles, obtained in 1950. Both took part in the final closing ceremony in 1968. Subsequently, No.174 remained in the Reading area, appearing at Reading Transport's 75th Anniversary event, and used as a static exhibit at transport festivals. It moved to Sandtoft in 2006, when it was repainted and rewired, but further internal work is required before it can be used to give rides to the public. No.181 has been at Sandtoft since 1969, and was rewired and repainted in the 1990s. Internal restoration work was completed in 2006.
- No.193 was one of the final batch of forward entrance Sunbeams obtained by Reading in 1961, and became the first trolleybus to arrive at the Sandtoft site when it was moved there in November 1969. After a repaint in 1984, it was in regular use at museum open days. Around 2000, it returned to Reading for further restoration work, and moved back to Sandtoft in 2006, but some more internal work is required before it can be used by the public.
- Teesside T291 is also at Sandtoft. This was part of the same batch as No.193, but whereas six of the batch including No.193 were fitted with refurbished motors and electrical equipment from withdrawn AECs, the other six, including No.186, were fitted with new AEI motors and equipment. Five of the latter type were sold to Teesside, and No.186 entered service there on 1 April 1969. It was initially numbered 11, but subsequently became T291. It was the official last trolleybus in Teesside, and after the system closed on 18 April 1971, it was purchased by Mike Dare in May. It was stored at Sandtoft and nearby Westgate for years, but was then sold on, and from 1993 was at the East Anglia Transport Museum at Carlton Colville, before being moved to the Black Country Living Museum at Dudley. The floor of the upper deck was rebuilt while it was there, but it was sold again in 2011, and returned to Sandtoft on 20 April, where additional work was required before it could be returned to public service.
- Sandtoft Museum also own a horse-drawn tower wagon built by Robert Blackwell and Co. in 1903, to enable the original Reading horse tramway to be converted to an electric tramway. It survived into the trolleybus era, and was used until 1967 to facilitate the repainting of the standards supporting the wiring, rather than the maintenance of the overhead wiring itself. It is affectionately known as William, since that was the only part of William John Evans, the General Manager's name, that was legible when it was acquired. The wheels were rebuilt in 2010, and there are plans to complete the restoration of this rare vehicle.

== See also ==
- Reading Transport
- List of trolleybus systems in the United Kingdom

== Bibliography ==
- Bunce, Alan (24 December 2013). "Remnants of old Reading". Berkshire Live. Archived from the original on 1 January 2014.
- BTS (2017). "The History of the British Trolleybus Society". British Trolleybus Society. Archived from the original on 9 August 2017.
- Hall, D A (1991). Reading Trolleybuses: a detailed history of the trolleybus in Reading 1936–1968. Reading, Berkshire, UK: Trolleybooks. ISBN 978-0-904235-12-8.
- Hall, David (1997). Reading Trolleybuses. Midhurst, West Sussex, UK: Middleton Press. ISBN 978-1-901706-05-5.
- Hall, Dave (October 2012). "Chapter 12 – The Dream Becomes a Reality" (PDF). British Trolleybus Society. Archived (PDF) from the original on 24 May 2020.
- Hall, Dave (May 2013). "Chapter 14 – The End Of The Beginning" (PDF). British Trolleybus Society. Archived (PDF) from the original on 24 May 2020.
- Johnson, Dennis (10 August 2011). "Reading Bus Depot". Berkshire Industrial Archaeology Group. Archived from the original on 1 August 2016.
- Joyce, J; King, J S; Newman, A G (1986). British Trolleybus Systems. London: Ian Allan Publishing. ISBN 978-0-7110-1647-7.
- Lockwood, Stephen (2011). Trackless to Trolleybus: Trolleybuses in Britain. Adam Gordon. ISBN 978-1-874422-86-0.
- Lumb, Geoff (1995). British Trolleybuses, 1911-1972. Ian Allan. ISBN 978-0-7110-2347-5.
- Rowe, Bob; Stubbs, Ian (2014). Museum Fleet Handbook. Venture Publications. ISBN 978-1-905304-63-9.
- Short, Peter (2011). "Former UK systems". British Trolleybus Society. Archived from the original on 22 June 2014.
- Turner, Keith (1996). The Directory of British Tramways. Patrick Stephens. ISBN 978-1-85260-549-0.
- Whitehead, John R (1968). The trolleybuses of Reading: a comprehensive survey of the history of the Reading trolleybus system with complete fleet details, class details and a record of disposals of sold vehicles. Reading, Berkshire, UK: Reading Transport Society. OCLC 30295897.
- Williams, Robert (2017). "Reading Transport Route 17". www.buszone.co.uk. Archived from the original on 12 February 2017.
- Williams, Robert (2018). "Reading Corporation Transport - Trolleybuses". www.buszone.co.uk. Archived from the original on 6 July 2019.
- Zebedee, John (26 April 2015). "A List of Preserved Trolleybuses in the UK". British Trolleybus Society. Archived from the original on 15 October 2016.
- Farewell to the Trolleybus. Reading, Berkshire, UK: Reading Corporation. 1968.
- 75 years of municipal transport. Reading, Berkshire, UK: Reading Borough Council. 1976. OCLC 642488147.
