= List of public art in Reading, Berkshire =

This is a list of public art in the English town of Reading. This list applies only to works of art accessible in an outdoor public space. For example, this does not include artwork visible inside a museum.

List of public art in Reading
Image	Title / subject	Location and coordinates	Date	Artist / designer	Type	Material	Dimensions	Designation	Notes
More images	Abbey Gateway Heads	Abbey Gateway 51°27′23.2″N 0°58′00.5″W	1900	Andrew Ohlson	Sculpture	Stone			A series of heads, attached to the medieval former inner gateway of Reading Abbey.
More images	l'Armour, or the Armoured Heart	The Oracle Riverside 51°27′12.38″N 0°58′12.83″W	2023	Stuart Melrose	Sculpture	Metal			Sculpture constructed by the Reading Amnesty Art Project and incorporating reclaimed weapons from knife amnesty bins.
More images	Balls Head / Interpretation of Ruins	Reading Abbey 51.455920°N 0.965399°W	2000	Jens-Flemming Sørensen	Sculpture	Bronze			A sculpture based on an interpretation of the adjacent ruins of the abbey. It has no formal name, but is sometimes referred to as either the Balls Head or the Interpretation of Ruins.
More images	Black History Mural	Mill Lane 51.4528°N 0.969°W	1988	Alan Howard with members of Reading Central Club	Mural				Mural illustrating the roles black people have played throughout history.
More images	Cartwheeling Boys	Civic Centre 51.45339°N 0.976029°W		Brian Slack	Sculpture				Erected to mark the thirtieth anniversary of the link between Reading and Düsseldorf established by Phoebe Cusden in 1947. It was toppled by Storm Eunice on 18 February 2022.
More images	Caversham Village Sign	Caversham 51.467565°N 0.974626°W		Stuart King	Village sign				Erected in 2003 to commemorate the Golden Jubilee of HM Queen Elizabeth II and repaired and conserved by the original artist in 2019.
More images	Caversham War Memorial	Christchurch Meadows, Caversham 51.465362°N 0.97543°W	1928		Memorial column	Stone			Commemorates the dead of Caversham in the First World War, Second World War and war in Afghanistan.
More images	Central Piazza Water Feature	Kennet Island 51.430908°N 0.975615°W			Fountain				
More images	Compleat Angler	Chocolate Island in River Kennet 51.455999°N 0.961520°W	1992	Kevin Atherton	Statue				Statue of an angler placed on Chocolate Island in the River Kennet, where that river once flowed through the Huntley & Palmers factory. The statue was erected when the factory closed to commemorate the people of Reading who worked there.
More images	Cows	Regent Court 51.458554°N 0.977980°W			Mural				Mural of cows situated close to the Reading Cattle Market.
More images	Edward VII	Station Square 51.45773°N 0.9724°W	1902	George Edward Wade	Statue	Bronze		Grade II	Celebrates the coronation of King Edward VII.
More images	Escaping convict on Reading Gaol	Reading Gaol 51.456710°N 0.963530°W	2021	Banksy	Graffiti	Paint on brickwork			The mural of an escaping prisoner - possibly resembling famous inmate Oscar Wilde - appeared on the walls of the disused Reading jail on Monday 01 March 2021. Reading prison famously housed Irish writer Wilde between 1895 and 1897 and was immortalised by his poem Ballad of Reading Gaol, which reflected on the brutality of the Victorian penal system.
More images	Frederick Potts Memorial	The Forbury 51.456552°N 0.967194°W	2015	Tom Murphy	Memorial; Sculpture	Bronze			Commemorates and depicts the rescue of Trooper Arthur Andrews by Trooper Frederick Potts, both men having been wounded during the Gallipoli campaign of World War I, and for which Potts was awarded the Victoria Cross. Adjacent is a roll of honour to the 426 men of the Berkshire Yeomanry, the regiment to which both Potts and Andrews belonged, who lost their lives in the wars of the 20th Century. Both are mounted on plinths faced in Portland stone.
More images	Gateway	Reading International Business Park 51.416°N 0.974°W	2000	Clare Bigger	Sculpture				At the entrance to the Reading International Business Park.
More images	George Palmer	Palmer Park 51.451946°N 0.938628°W	1891	George Blackall Simonds	Statue	Bronze		Grade II	Commemorates George Palmer, the founder of the biscuit manufacturers Huntley & Palmers. Originally sited in Broad Street, but relocated to Palmer Park in 1930.
More images	Girl and Swan	Kings Road 51.4548°N 0.9647°W	1984	Lorne McKean	Statue	Bronze			Depicts a young girl reaching up to touch a swan flying overhead.
	Hexham Road Tree	Community Centre, Hexham Road 51.437429°N 0.959145°W	1998	Bhajan Hunjan					Three dimensional mural on the wall of Hexham Road Community Centre.
More images	Hugh de Boves and Hugh of Faringdon Memorials	Reading Abbey 51.456363°N 0.964878°W	1911	William Silver Frith	Relief	Limestone			Two stone reliefs, showing the first and the last abbot of Reading Abbey and flanking the east end of the ruined chapter house of the abbey.
More images	Inner Light	Kings Road 51.455736°N 0.961695°W	1992	Liliane Lijn	Sculpture				Overlooks the River Kennet behind the offices of Prudential in Kings Road, Reading
More images	International Brigade Memorial	Forbury Gardens 51.456816°N 0.965834°W	1990	Eric Stanford	Memorial; Statue				Memorial to the Reading members of the International Brigade in the Spanish Civil War. Originally sited at Reading Civic Centre but relocated to Forbury Gardens in 2015.
More images	Jubilee Fountain	St Mary's Butts 51.454233°N 0.974229°W	1887	George W Webb	Fountain	Stone			Commemorates Queen Victoria's golden jubilee. In Red Mansfield and Portland stone and Peterhead granite. The fountain bowl has been converted into a flower display.
More images	Maiwand Lion	Forbury Gardens 51.456952°N 0.967481°W	1884	George Blackall Simonds	Memorial; Sculpture	Cast iron		Grade II	Commemorates the Battle of Maiwand in 1880.
More images	Meteor Garden	Harris Garden, University of Reading 51.435653°N 0.940898°W	2015		Sculpture				Sponsored by the Friends of the Harris Garden and designed by their volunteers.
More images	Oscar Wilde Memorial	Chestnut Walk 51.455805°N 0.963573°W	2000	Bruce Williams and Paul Muldoon	Memorial				Memorial to Oscar Wilde, who was imprisoned in the adjacent Reading Gaol and wrote the Ballad of Reading Gaol. Comprises metal gates, fencing and seats all with cultural references to Wilde.
More images	Pivotal	Station Hill development 51.45823°N 0.97343°W	2024	NEON	Sculpture				A kinetic artwork inspired by flags and composed of 73 brightly coloured fins, each of which moves in the wind. At night, animated lighting within each fin will transform the piece.
More images	Queen Victoria	Town Hall Square 51.456551°N 0.970177°W		George Blackall Simonds	Statue	Marble		Grade II	Celebrates the Jubilee of Queen Victoria.
More images	Reading Cenotaph	Forbury Gardens 51.456547°N 0.968046°W	1932	Edward Leslie Gunston	Memorial column	Stone			Commemorates the dead of Reading and Berkshire in the First World War.
More images	Robed Figure	Reading Abbey 51.456197°N 0.965418°W	1988	Elisabeth Frink	Statue				A near-duplicate of the central of the central figure from Elisabeth Frink's work Martyrs of Dorchester.
More images	Royals, Residents & a Rock Festival	Station Hill development / Reading railway station 51.458656°N 0.972995°W	2014	Stuart Melrose and Kev Munday	Mural	Solid surface material internally illuminated with LEDs			One of two such murals, the other being 'Rivers, Ruins & Regency' at the Friar Street end of the development. These murals depict notable figures and landmarks from Reading's history, including King Henry I, Kate Winslet, and the Hexagon Theatre.
More images	Rufus Isaacs	Eldon Square 51.45773°N 0.9724°W		Charles Sargeant Jagger	Statue				Commemorates Rufus Isaacs, who held the roles of Attorney General, Lord Chief Justice and Viceroy of India, and was the first Marquess of Reading. The statue was originally sited in New Delhi but was offered as a gift to Reading after India achieved its independence in 1947. It was relocated to its current location in 1971.
More images	Rustic Fountain	Forbury Gardens 51.430908°N 0.975615°W	1856		Fountain				A rustic fountain in a pond, by an unknown artist but believed to date from 1856 when the town's Forbury was first laid out as 'pleasure gardens'.
More images	Simeon Monument	Market Place 51.45561°N 0.9695°W	1804	John Soane		Portland stone	25 feet (7.6 m) in height		Also known as the Soane Obelisk, the Soane Monument and the Simeon Obelisk. Commissioned in his lifetime by Edward Simeon and with a triangular cross-section, it is technically neither a monument nor an obelisk, despite often being called both.
More images	Space Between	Forbury Road 51.457584°N 0.966101°W		Simon Hitchens	Sculpture	Granite	5 metres (16 ft) in height		Twin helical blocks of granite, carved from Chinese granite, situated outside new office blocks on Forbury Road opposite Forbury Gardens.
More images	Sumer Is Icumen In	Reading Abbey 51.456404°N 0.965089°W			Relief	Limestone			Stone relief commemorating the composition of the early English song Sumer Is Icumen In at Reading Abbey in the 13th century.
More images	University of Reading War Memorial	London Road Campus of the University of Reading 51°27′01.6″N 00°57′40.3″W	1924	Herbert Maryon	Clock tower	Brick	60 feet (18 m) in height		
More images	131 greetings Welcome to Reading	Brunel Arcade, Reading railway station 51°27′29.8″N 0°58′17.4″W	2023	Haya Sheffer	Mural				The mural presents the greeting Welcome to Reading in 131 different languages.
