= Bazalgette Memorial =

Sculpture by George Blackall Simonds

Coordinates: 51.5064°N 0.1222°W

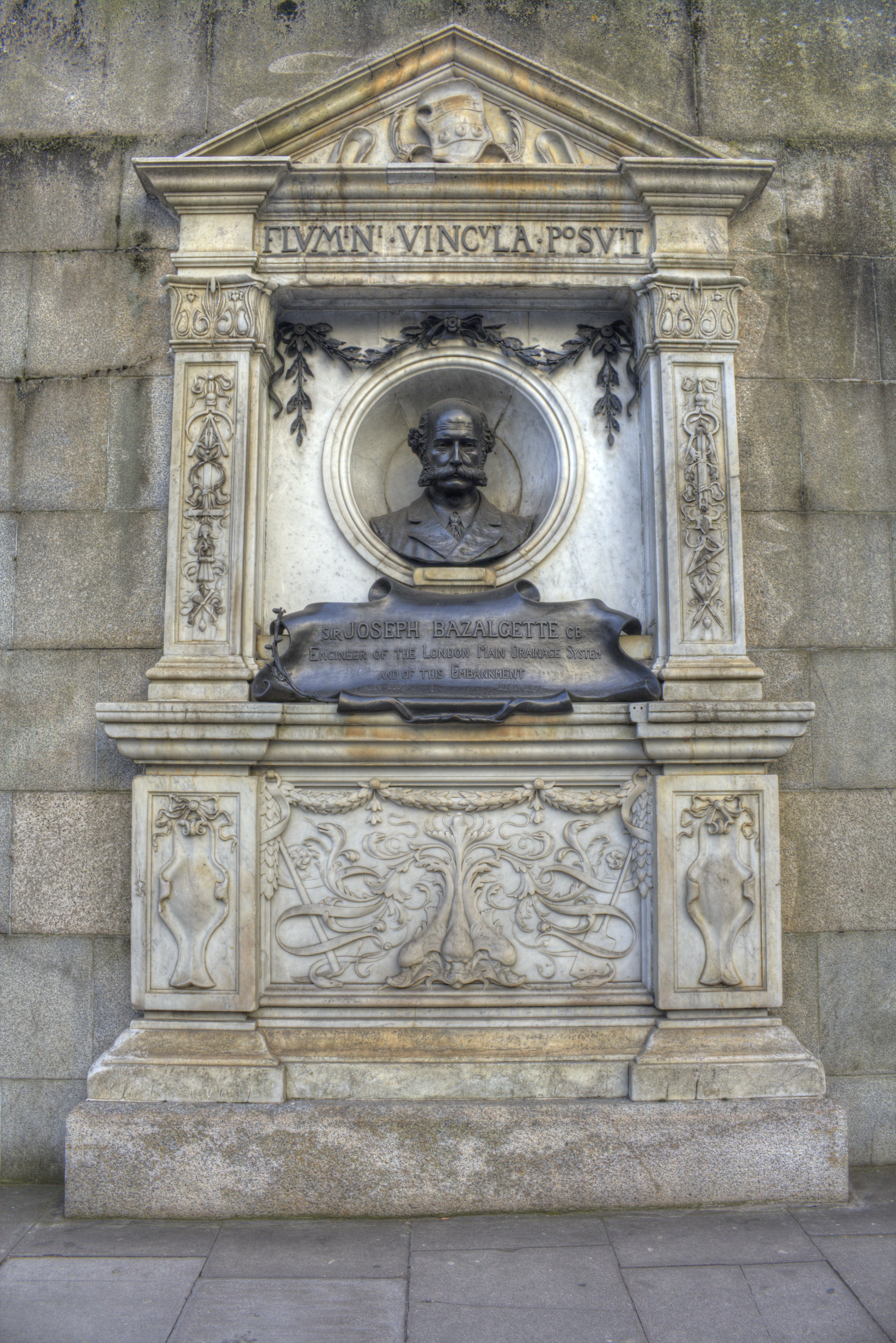
The Bazalgette Memorial

The Sir Joseph Bazalgette Memorial is a memorial to the Victorian engineer Sir Joseph Bazalgette, by George Blackall Simonds. It is located on the Victoria Embankment, a few feet up river from the Hungerford Bridge and Golden Jubilee Bridges, opposite the junction with Northumberland Avenue.

== Artist ==
George Blackall Simonds (1843–1929) was a Reading sculptor and director of H & G Simonds Brewery. He exhibited consistently at the Royal Academy. Simonds studied under Johannes Schilling in Dresden, and Louis Jehotte at The Academy of Brussels. He created over 200 pieces in many different media.

While The Falconer (1873) is in Central Park, New York, much of his larger work is to be found in or near Reading. The Maiwand Lion (1866) in the Forbury Gardens is his, the statue of Queen Victoria at the Town Hall, the Statue of George Palmer (moved from the High Street to a park) and the statue of H. Blandy, another mayor of Reading.

Substantial pieces were also commissioned for Indian locations, Allahabad and Calcutta.

In 1922 he designed the war memorial at Bradfield, Berkshire, which commemorated the deaths of local men in the First World War including his son, a lieutenant with the South Wales Borderers.

== Subject ==
Bazalgette was a prolific Victorian engineer, responsible for the Embankment on the north of the Thames, as well as the smaller Albert Embankment to the south. As chief engineer of London's Metropolitan Board of Works his major achievement was the creation (in response to the Great Stink of 1858) of a sewer network for central London which was instrumental in relieving the city from cholera epidemics, while beginning to clean the River Thames. Bazalgette's neo-classical mausoleum is in the churchyard of St. Mary's in Wimbledon.
