= Joel Rudnick =

American painter and sculptor (1936–2025)

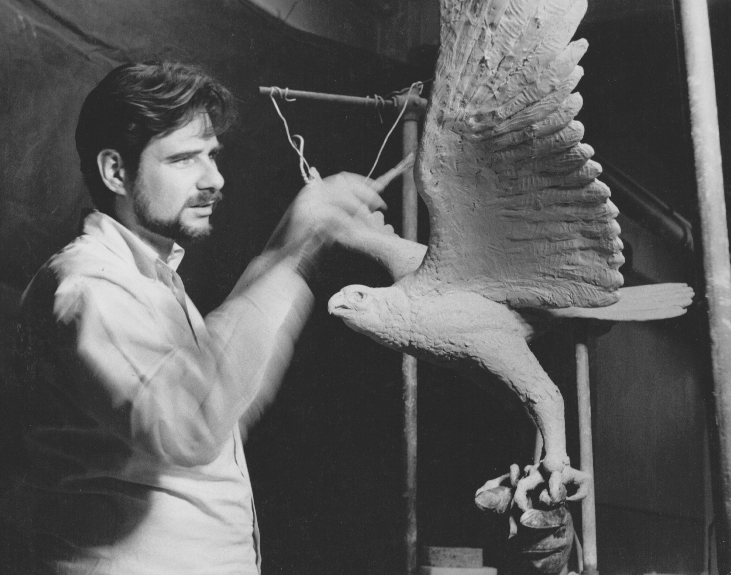
Rudnick, in his 30s, remodeling the falcon

Joel Rudnick (June 27, 1936 – June 22, 2025) was an American painter and sculptor.

== Background ==
Originally from Brooklyn, New York, Rudnick received his initial training as a painter at the Art Students League of New York. He was a protégé of Shelly Fink and studied with the caricaturist and painter David Levine on a scholarship at the Brooklyn Museum Art School. Rudnick also studied sculpture at the National Academy of Design in New York City.

Rudnick died on June 22, 2025, at the age of 88.

== Career ==
Rudnick re-modeled the falcon for the Central Park statue called The Falconer by George Blackall Simonds. The remodeling occurred in the late 1960s although, due to lack of funds, it was not actually cast and mounted until 1982.

The bulk of Rudnick's paintings are impressionistic landscapes of the Berkshires, which he has called home for most of his adult life. His sculptures, mostly nudes, depict people in various stages of life or in their loving interactions with each other.

== Awards ==
- Elizabeth T. Greenshields Memorial Foundation grant, Montreal, Canada
- Joel Meisner Foundry Prize, Salmagundi Club, New York City
- Lindsay Morris Memorial Award, Allied Artists of America, New York City
- Mrs. Louis Bennett Prize, National Sculpture Society
- The Louis La Baume Memorial Prize
- Harriet Whitney Frismuth Prize, National Academy School of Fine Arts
- Honorable mentions from the National Sculpture Society and Allied Artists of America
