= Forbury Hill =

Forbury Hill may refer to:

- A hill in St Clair, New Zealand, a suburb of the city of New Zealand
- A formerly fortified mound in Forbury Gardens, in central Reading, England
