= Reading Post =

Defunct weekly newspaper in Reading, England

- Type: Weekly newspaper
- Format: Tabloid
- Owner: Reach plc
- Editor: Andy Murrill
- Ceased publication: 2015
- Language: English
- Headquarters: Reading, Berkshire
- Website: getreading.co.uk

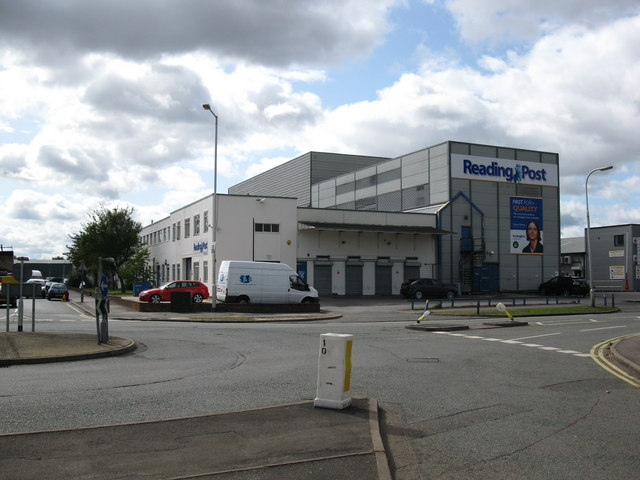
Reading Post offices, Richfield Avenue

The Reading Post (formerly the Reading Evening Post) was an English local newspaper covering Reading, Berkshire and surrounding areas. The title page of the paper featured the Maiwand Lion, a local landmark at Forbury Gardens. The paper was most recently published by Surrey & Berkshire Media Ltd., a division of Trinity Mirror plc.

After it ceased print publication in 2015, the Reading Post became online-only and was renamed Get Reading. It was relaunched as BerkshireLive in 2019, before closing in November 2023.

== Editions ==
In 2009, the paper changed from daily publication to publishing weekly on a Wednesday as a paid-for paper with a free edition on a Friday titled Get Reading. The paper was previously promoted as an evening paper and published Monday to Friday. In recent years, all editions were tabloid though it was launched as a broadsheet.

== Sale ==
In February 2010 the division of Guardian Media Group that included the Reading Evening Post was sold to Trinity Mirror. This sale included 22 titles across the north of England and in Surrey and Berkshire.

== Awards ==
The Reading Evening Post was named Regional Newspaper of the Year for the second year running at the 2004 Newspaper Awards.

== Closure ==
The final issue was published on 17 December 2014. It then became online-only, renaming as Get Reading. In 2019 it was rebranded BerkshireLive. On 30 November 2023, the website ceased being updated.
