= Tutts Clump =

Coordinates: 51.4364°N 1.1568°W

- Hamlet
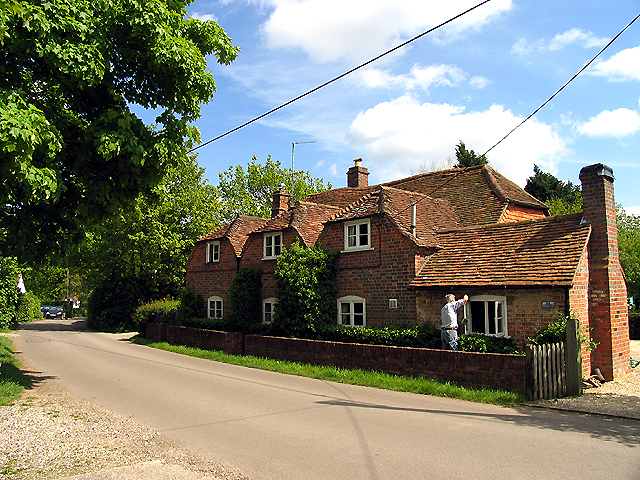
- Old Cottages, Tutts Clump

- Location within Berkshire
- OS grid reference: SU587712
- Civil parish: Bradfield
- Unitary authority: West Berkshire
- Ceremonial county: Berkshire
- Region: South East
- Country: England
- Sovereign state: United Kingdom
- Post town: Reading
- Postcode district: RG7
- Police: Thames Valley
- Fire: Royal Berkshire
- Ambulance: South Central
- UK Parliament: Reading West and Mid Berkshire

Tutts Clump is a small hamlet in the civil parish of Bradfield in the English county of Berkshire. It is 8 miles (13 km) from the centre of Reading. It lies about 1 mile (1.6 km) south-east of Stanford Dingley, close to the neighbouring villages of Bradfield Southend and Rotten Row. Legend has it that the name is derived from that of an English Civil War general. There is a Methodist chapel in the hamlet. The local post office closed in 1983.

== Economy ==
There is a cider manufacturer, Tutts Clump in the settlement.
