= Peter Nelson (cricketer, born 1913) =

English cricketer and British Army officer (1913–1998)

Personal information
- Full name: Peter Maurice Nelson
- Born: 22 March 1913; Bradfield, Berkshire, England
- Died: 12 March 1998 (aged 84); Newbury, Berkshire, England
- Batting: Right-handed
- Bowling: Right-arm off break

Domestic team information
- Years: Team
- 1931: Oxfordshire

Career statistics
Competition	First-class
Matches	1
Runs scored	62
Batting average	62.00
100s/50s	–/1
Top score	62
Balls bowled	120
Wickets	1
Bowling average	63.00
5 wickets in innings	–
10 wickets in match	–
Best bowling	1/63
Catches/stumpings	2/–
- Source: Cricinfo, 16 April 2019

Peter Maurice Nelson (22 March 1913 – 12 February 1998) was an English first-class cricketer and British Army officer. Nelson served in the Royal Berkshire Regiment from 1933–1946, during which he saw service in the Second World War. He also played first-class cricket for the British Army cricket team.

== Life and military career ==
Nelson was born at Bradfield and educated at Marlborough College. He played minor counties cricket for Oxfordshire in 1931, making a single appearance in the Minor Counties Championship. From Marlborough he attended the Royal Military College, Sandhurst, graduating as a second lieutenant into the Royal Berkshire Regiment in August 1933. He was promoted to the rank of lieutenant in August 1936. He made his only appearance in first-class cricket for the British Army cricket team against Cambridge University at Fenner's in 1939. He batted once during the match, scoring 62 runs in the Army's first-innings, before being dismissed by Patrick Dickinson. With his right-arm off break bowling, he took a single wicket when he dismissed John Blake in the Cambridge University second-innings.

Nelson served in the Second World War, during which he was promoted to the rank of captain in August 1941. Following the war, he was promoted to the rank of major in August 1946. He retired from active service four months later on account of disability. In later life he was a horse trainer and breeder. He died at Newbury in February 1998.
