= The Falconer (Simonds) =

English sculpture in New York

Coordinates: 40°46′26.8″N 73°58′25.7″W

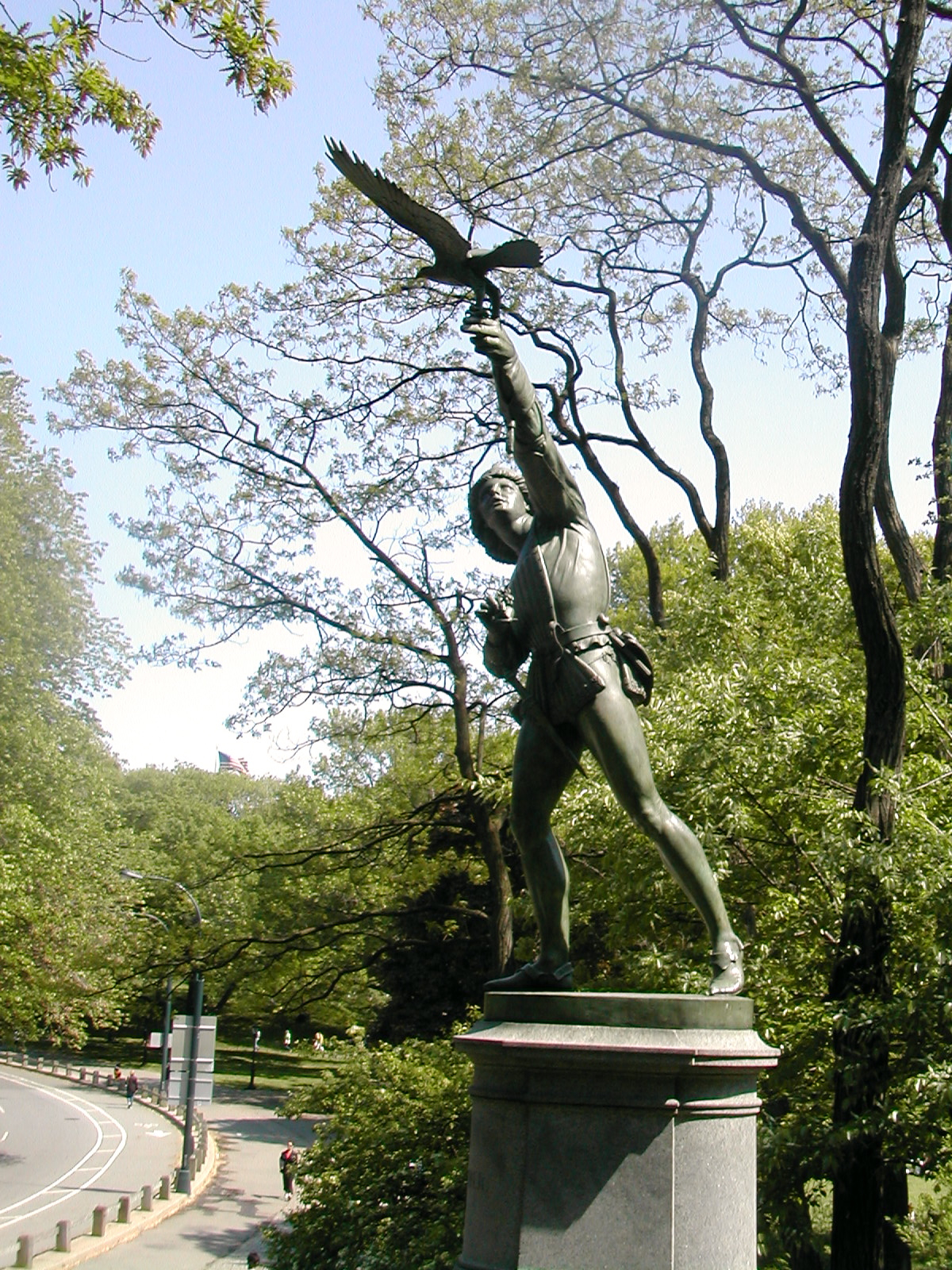
- Artist: George Blackall Simonds
- Year: 1871 (installed 1875)
- Location: Central Park; New York City

The Falconer is a bronze sculpture in Central Park, New York City by English sculptor George Blackall Simonds. It depicts a man in a theatrical version of Elizabethan dress standing on a high granite pedestal, releasing a hunting falcon.

The Falconer, cast in 1871 in Florence, was erected in 1875 on a prominent rock overlooking the confluence of Terrace Drive and another carriage drive near the West 72nd Street drive entrance. The growth of surrounding trees has partly obscured the site. The sculpture has a history of being vandalized. The original falcon was stolen, and in the 1960s the New York City Parks Department commissioned their employee and sculptor, Joel Rudnick, to mold a new falcon which now sits on The Falconer's arm. This new falcon is substantially different from the original falcon. The arm itself was also re-fashioned by Parks' employee Domenico Facci.
