= Statue of George Palmer =

Statue in Reading, Berkshire, England

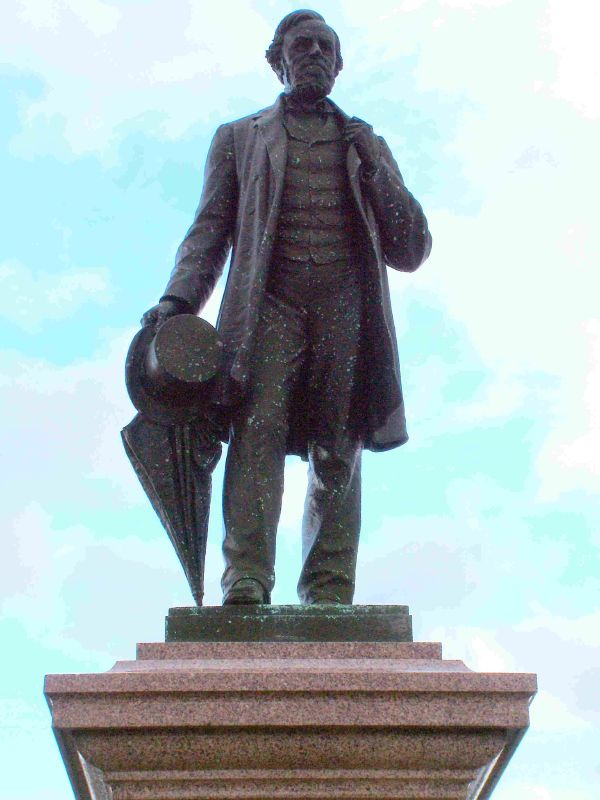
- The statue of George Palmer

- Location within Berkshire
- Artist: George Blackall Simonds
- Year: 1891
- Medium: Bronze
- Subject: George Palmer
- Designation: Grade II Listed monument
- Location: Palmer Park, Reading; 51.4519°N 0.9386°W
- Preceded by: The Four Seasons, copper relief
- Followed by: Perseus the Destroyer, bronze statuette

The statue of George Palmer stands in Palmer Park, in Reading, Berkshire. The statue, by George Blackall Simonds, was unveiled on 4 November 1891, though it was originally in Broad Street and only later moved to Palmer Park. The statue has been classed Grade II Listed monument since 14 December 1978.

== Overview ==
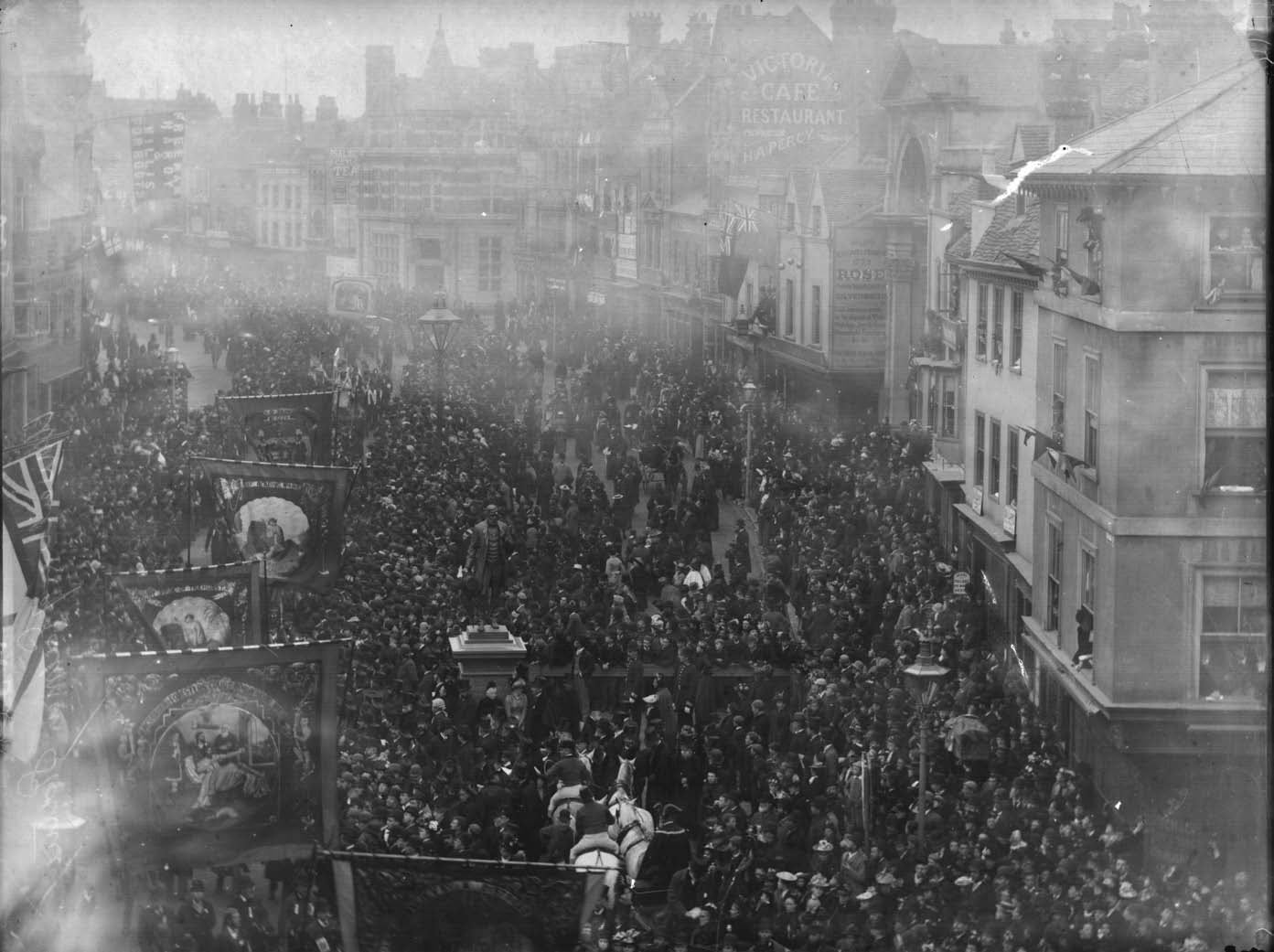
Unveiling of the statue in Board Street on 4 October 1891

The statue was given by the towns-folk of Reading, "in recognition of his services and gifts to the town", and unveiled 4 November 1891, the same day of the opening of the 49 acre Palmer Park. Four thousand subscribed to the cost of the statue. The opening of the park and the unveiling of the statue have been described as "the biggest celebration Reading had ever seen.

It was originally sited in Broad Street, but was moved in 1930 to its current location.

The statue depicts Palmer, standing, with top hat and umbrella clasped in his right hand, while his left holds his lapel. It was the first statue in Britain with an umbrella. The statue was unveiled on 14 November 1891, the same day that Palmer Park was given to the town.

The statue is in bronze, mounted on a substantial pink granite plinth, with moulded cornice and base.

== Subject ==
George Palmer (1818–1897) was a Quaker baker, known for his partnership with Thomas Huntley, which formed the biscuit firm Huntley and Palmers. Palmer invented machinery which stamped biscuits in bulk. A noted philanthropist, he gave the site of Palmer Park to Reading in 1891, as well as King's Meadow. His family also donated the site of Reading University. The borough also granted him Freedom of the City, the first person honoured thus, in recognition of his many contributions to civic life.

== Artist ==
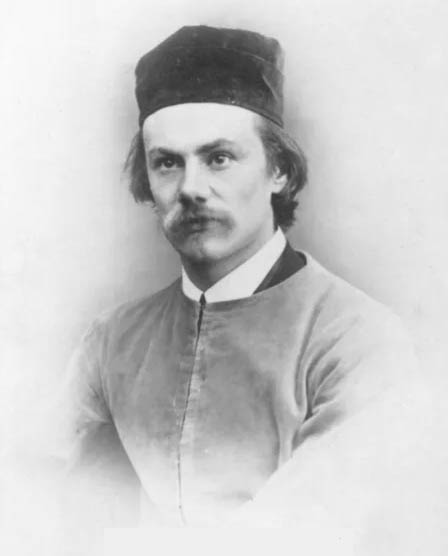
George Simonds

George Blackall Simonds (1843–1929) was a Reading sculptor and director of H & G Simonds Brewery. He exhibited consistently at the Royal Academy. Simonds studied under Johannes Schilling in Dresden, and Louis Jehotte at The Academy of Brussels. He created over 200 pieces in many different media.

While The Falconer (1873) is in Central Park, New York, much of his larger work is to be found in or near Reading. Substantial pieces were also commissioned for Indian locations, Allahabad and Calcutta.

The Maiwand Lion (1866) in the Forbury Gardens is his, the statue of Queen Victoria at the Town Hall and the statue of Henry Blandy, another mayor of Reading. In 1922 he designed the war memorial at Bradfield, Berkshire, which commemorated the deaths of local men in the First World War including his son, a lieutenant with the South Wales Borderers.
