= Statue of Queen Victoria, Reading =

Sculpture by George Blackall Simonds

Coordinates: 51°27′24″N 0°58′13″W

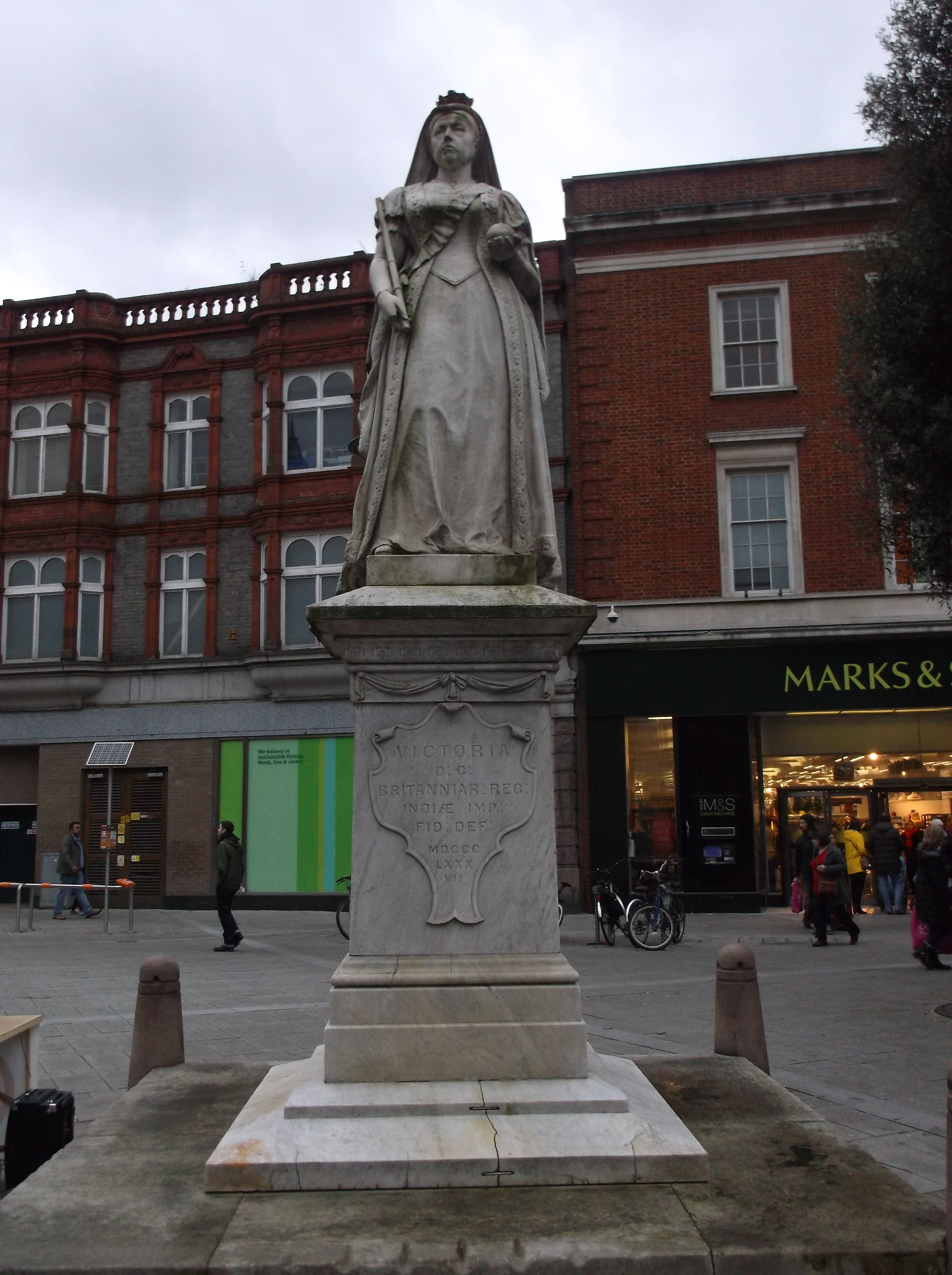
The statue in 2015

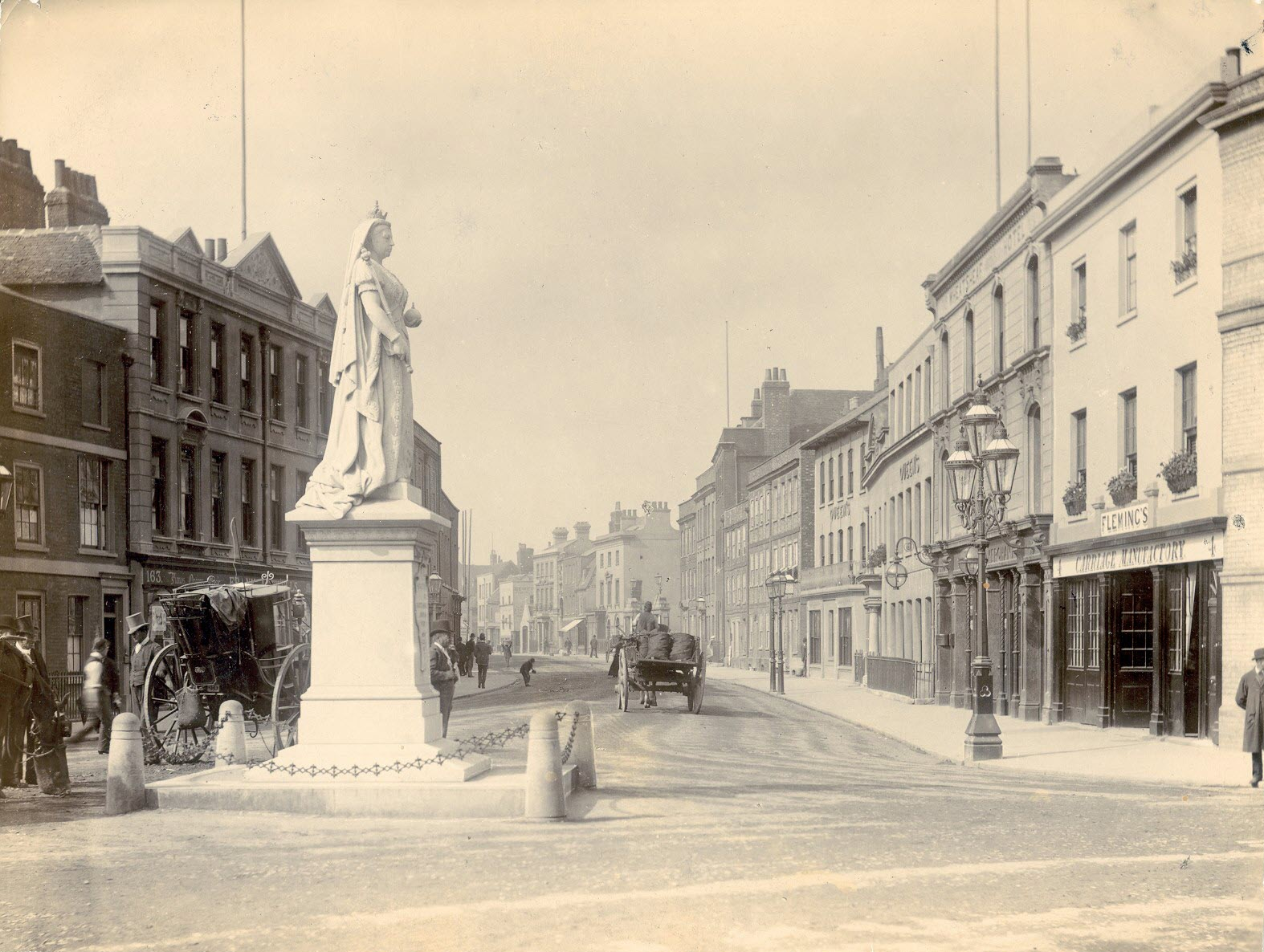
The statue c. 1888, with a view down Friar Street in the background

The statue of Queen Victoria stands at the eastern end of Friar Street outside the Town Hall of Reading, Berkshire, in southern England.

== The statue ==
Queen Victoria (1819–1901) was the queen of many realms in the British Empire, and Empress of India. She is widely memorialised in statuary, throughout the former British Empire, and elsewhere. This statue is carved from stone and stands atop a substantial plinth.

== The artist ==
George Blackall Simonds (1843–1929) was a Reading sculptor and director of H & G Simonds Brewery. He exhibited consistently at the Royal Academy. Simonds studied under Johannes Schilling in Dresden, and Louis Jehotte at The Royal Academy of Brussels. He created over 200 pieces in many different media.

While The Falconer (1873) is in Central Park, New York, much of his larger work is to be found in or near Reading. Substantial pieces were also commissioned for Allahabad and Calcutta in India.

The Maiwand Lion (1886) in the Forbury Gardens is his, the Statue of George Palmer and that of Henry Bilson Blandy, Mayor of Reading 1871–1873. In 1922 he designed the war memorial at Bradfield, Berkshire, which commemorates the deaths in the First World War of those of the 2nd Battalion, South Wales Borderers, including his son.
