= Palmer Park, Reading =

Park in Great Britain

Palmer Park
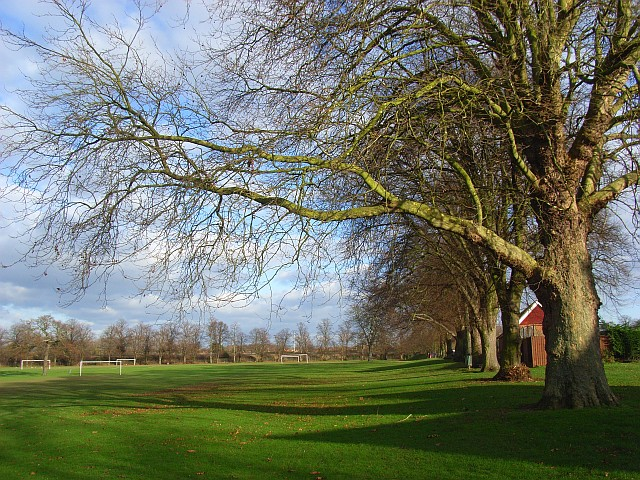
- View across the middle of the park

- Location within Reading, Berkshire
- Type: Public
- Location: Reading, Berkshire, UK
- Coordinates: 51°27′07″N 0°56′20″W

Palmer Park is a public park in Reading, England. The land for the park was given to the town by the proprietors of the Huntley & Palmers biscuit firm and it contains a statue of George Palmer. The park in turn gives its name to Park ward of the Borough of Reading, which surrounds it.

In 1882, the land was used for that year's Royal Agricultural Show, on one of its two visits to the town. In 1889, the initial 21 acres (8.5 ha) of land was transferred to the town by the proprietors of Huntley & Palmers. It was extended to 49 acres in 1891, and the full park was opened on 4 November 1891. The park and pavilion were designed by architect, William Ravenscroft.

The Park was the venue for the 1927 WAAA Championships, held on 9 July 1927.

Popular with local residents for various activities, it often hosts religious festivals, sports tournaments and small special events. In the past, Carter's Steam Fair visited the park every year. However, they had to suspend the annual event due to the discovery of ground subsidence in the park in 2001. Chalk mines were found underneath the park and the weight of the fairground rides posed a great danger. The areas affected have now been shored up and compacted to stop any incident from occurring and the Fair is visiting again.

== Park facilities ==
The park also contains Palmer Park Stadium, a velodrome and athletics stadium. Included in the park are Palmer Park Library, Palmer Park Bowling Club, two playgrounds, a community cafe and a number of football pitches which are used every week for local matches. During the summer months, some of the goal posts are removed to make way for a cricket pitch.

== See also ==
- List of parks and open spaces in Reading, Berkshire
