= Jens-Flemming Sørensen =

Danish sculptor (1933–2017)

Jens-Flemming Sørensen (30 August 1933 – 1 December 2017) was a Danish sculptor. Originally a tailor he worked most of his life as an artist of sculptures. Most of his work was fashioned from bronze and marble and frequently incorporated spherical shapes as well as depictions of the female body.

Sørensen was born in Copenhagen on 30 August 1933, and from 1987 lived and worked in Italy, mostly in the Toscana area known for its many artists. Jens-Flemming Sørensen died in Pietrasanta Italy on 1 December 2017 from natural causes.

In 1972 he was the recipient of the Eckersberg Medal.

== Public art by Jens-Flemming Sørensen ==
Image	Title / subject	Location and coordinates	Date	Type	Material	Dimensions	Designation	Notes
	Balls Head / Interpretation of Ruins	Reading Abbey, Reading, UK 51.455920°N 0.965399°W	2000	Sculpture	Bronze			A sculpture based on an interpretation of the adjacent ruins of the abbey. It has no formal name, but is sometimes referred to as either the Balls Head or the Interpretation of Ruins.
	Et sted mellem drøm og virkelighed	Marselisborg Palace, Aarhus, Denmark	1977	Sculpture	Bronze			
	Fontænen på Frue Kirkeplads	Frue Kirkeplads, Aarhus, Denmark 56.157765°N 10.204692°E	1977	Fountain; Sculpture	Granite; Bronze			
