= Eric Stanford =

English sculptor (1932–2020)

Eric Stanford, FRBS (1932 – 16 February 2020) was an English sculptor. He studied at the St. Martin's School of Art and the University of Reading. Stanford worked as a lecturer at the Berkshire College of Art and, from 1968 to 1989, he was Keeper of Art at Reading Museum and Art Gallery. He died on 16 February 2020, at the age of 87.

== Public art by Eric Stanford ==
Image	Title / subject	Location and coordinates	Date	Type	Material	Dimensions	Designation	Notes
	International Brigade Memorial	Forbury Gardens, Reading, UK 51.456816°N 0.965834°W	1990	Memorial; Statue				Memorial to the Reading members of the International Brigade in the Spanish Civil War. Originally sited at Reading Civic Centre but relocated to Forbury Gardens in 2015. Media related to the International Brigade Memorial at Wikimedia Commons
	Millennium Cross	St Johns Churchyard, Devizes, UK 51.35042°N 1.99493°W	2000	Sculpture				Celebrates the Millennium and the 1000 year history of Devizes. Media related to the Millennium cross at Wikimedia Commons
