= Phoebe Cusden =

English socialist, trade unionist, and educator

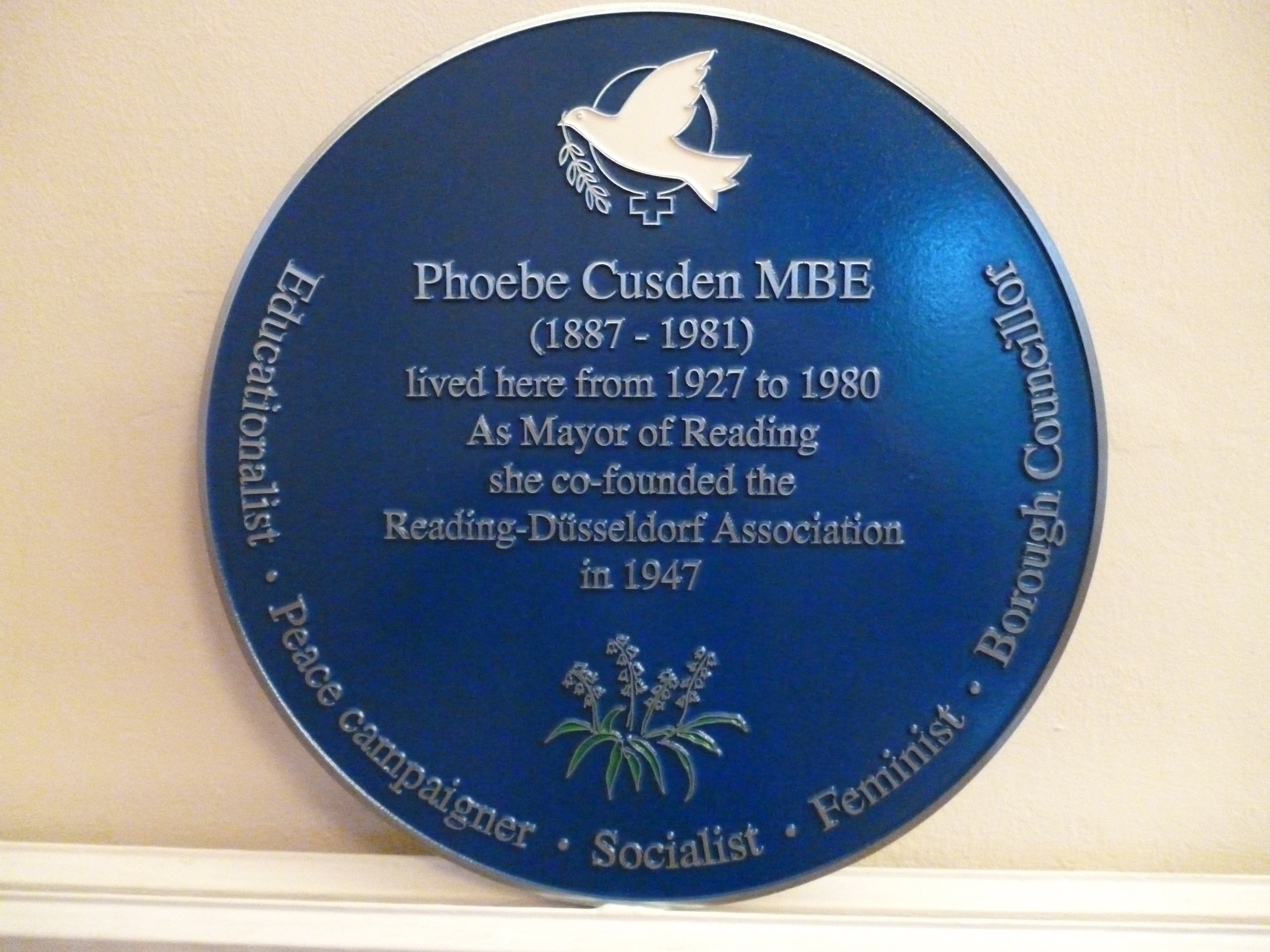
The blue plaque in Castle Street

Phoebe Cusden (1887–1981) was a socialist, trade unionist, educator, peace campaigner and politician from the English town of Reading. She was continuously active between the 1910s and the 1970s, and was a leading citizen of Reading over the middle part of the twentieth century. Particularly notable was that her local campaigning developed into an effort to broaden her own and her fellow citizens' awareness of issues of international peace and progress. She was a pioneer of local authority nursery education, and a founder of the post-war twin towns movement. Most significantly she developed a twin-town link enabling aid and practical assistance to the German city of Düsseldorf while it was still recovering from the devastation of World War II bombing. The link survives to this day.

== Early career and activity ==
Annie Phoebe Ellen Blackall was born in Reading on 2 March 1887, the daughter of a farrier and publican and his devout Anglican wife. Originally an Anglican herself, Phoebe in later life became a Quaker. Beginning work in the Reading Post Office in about 1901, she was an active trade unionist, and became a leading member of the Postal and Telegraph Clerks' Association. Early influences on Phoebe were John Rabson, a socialist councillor and fellow trade unionist, and Edith Morley of Reading University, the first female professor in the country. The Reading branch was a pioneer of the Workers' Educational Association, and Phoebe enrolled on Morley's WEA classes in English Literature. "Morley was a socialist, a suffragette, and a member of the Fabian Women's Group. Her ideas had a great influence on Phoebe, and the two became life-long friends" (quoted in Stout 1997 p 12). During the First World War, Phoebe was a pacifist, and left the Anglican Church over the issue. Her pacifism made her unenthusiastic about the idea of a Bolshevik-style revolution in Britain. During the war she began her freelance journalism career, and was a writer all her life (Stout 1997, Chapter 1).

Her first public role was on the local Profiteering Committee in 1919. She had already led a protest march the previous Christmas, with women at the head, against profiteering by food suppliers. The "Reading Worker" describes Phoebe addressing the crowd: "Miss Blackall tells of the women of her class who have to leave their household duties to stand in queues for hours, only to be turned away unable to buy the necessary food for their families. She protests against such indignities being inflicted on her sex and class".

Also in 1919 she was elected to the Reading Board of Guardians together with Albert Cusden, whom she married in 1922. Albert had been a teacher of English in Germany, and had been interned there during the First World War. He remained a remarkably supportive and selfless partner until his death in 1953. They had one daughter. As a Poor Law Guardian, Phoebe gained first-hand experience of poverty and the administration of the rudimentary welfare system in the town, including the workhouse provision.

== Political career ==
In 1923 Phoebe was an unsuccessful Labour parliamentary candidate in South Berks, and was also active in the General Strike of 1926. The Cusdens and others took in 70 striking miners' children from South Wales. She established the Reading Women's branch of the Labour Party, and in 1931, after three failed attempts was elected to Reading Council, as only the second female councillor in its history. Her principal interest on the Council was education, particularly nursery schools, but she was also involved in housing, town planning, health and related issues. She had begun editing the "Reading Citizen", a Labour Party newspaper, in 1924, and continued for nearly 30 years. Albert Cusden was the printer. Her journalism was also significant and long-lasting after World War II in the international peace movement.

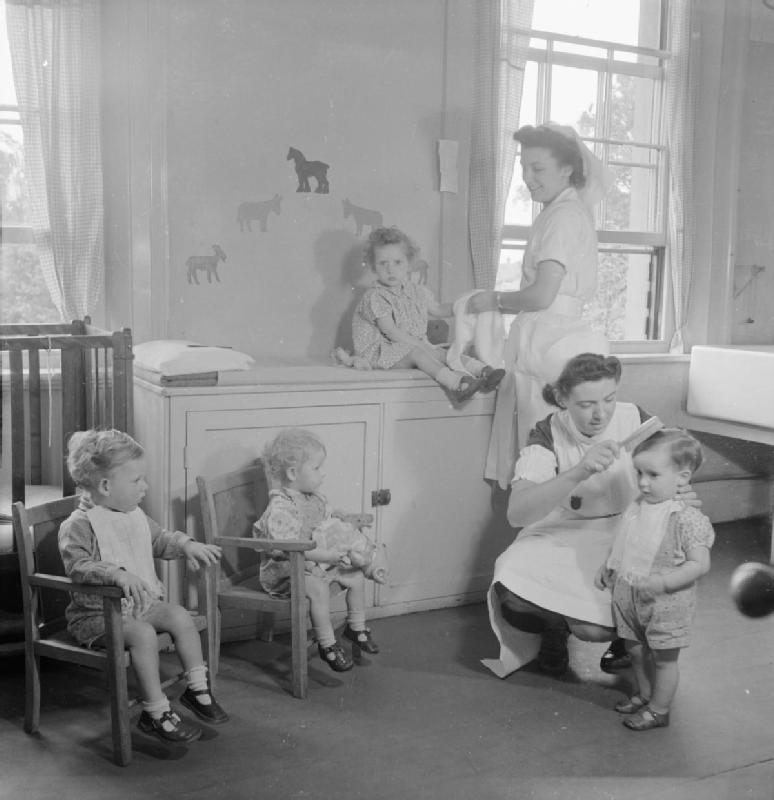
A Picture of a Southern Town - Life in Wartime Reading, Berkshire, England, UK. Phoebe Cusden promoted nurseries in Reading

Cusden was communicating with Daisy Solomon, secretary of the Commonwealth League about participation in the League of Nations in Geneva in 1932. Cusden also became organising secretary of the Nursery Schools Association in 1933, and turned it into a high-profile campaigning body. She wrote "The English Nursery School" (1938), for many years the standard work on the subject. She also became a magistrate, and remained a strong pacifist. During the Second World War, Phoebe organised youth camps, served on the Reading Famine Committee, and was involved with evacuees from London. Phoebe Cusden was chosen as Mayor of Reading in November 1946, when Labour took control of the council for the first time. As mayor she had a secretary for the first and last time in her life. During her year she organised relief when the Thames flooded in Reading following the severe winter of 1947, and was involved with her husband in the foundation of the Progress Theatre, which is still active and successful in Reading. After her period as mayor she was an alderman on the council for several years until displaced by the Conservatives. From 1949 on she concentrated on international work.

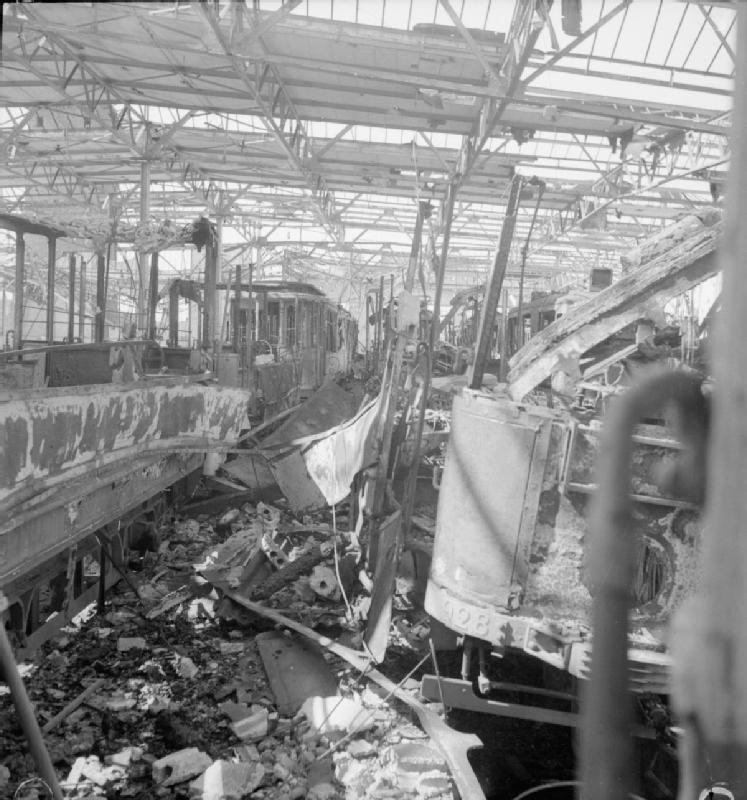
Düsseldorf, Bombed Tram Depot, 1942–1945

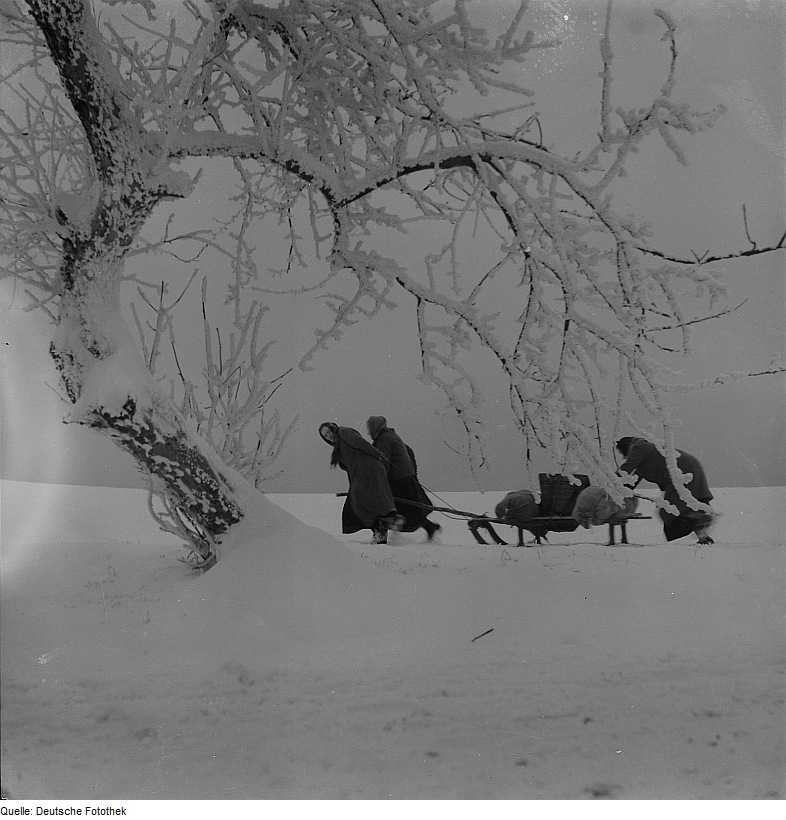
Women collecting fuel in Germany, 1946

== The Reading-Düsseldorf initiative ==
In 1946, with information, support and assistance from people such as the publisher Victor Gollancz, General Robert Collins of the Royal Berkshire Regiment and the junior government minister Frank Pakenham (later Lord Longford), Phoebe led a local appeal for help for people in Düsseldorf and visited the city to find out the conditions under British occupation. The city was suffering extreme privation. By concentrating on the plight of its children, Phoebe was able to overcome potential prejudice against helping the recent foe. She wrote to the Berkshire Chronicle in November 1946: "It might be difficult for any one family to send an entire parcel, whereas they would be willing to contribute one or two articles. Therefore, a collection of foodstuffs is being organised under the title 'The Mayor's Winter Collection for German children.' I appeal most earnestly for the utmost generosity, which will create a feeling of goodwill between ourselves and the recipients, so necessary to future peace." Victor Gollancz had in November written to the national press saying that people in Düsseldorf were living on between 400 and 1000 calories per day, and that 400 was "half the Belsen rate".

By 17 January 1947, the collection had raised £79 12s 2d, 1000 pounds (about half a ton) of food, 150 parcels and 12 sacks of clothing and shoes. The final total in March was over £93. She wrote "The condition of the poorest family in Reading is many times better than the average family in Germany...it would surely be disastrous to any hope of rebuilding Europe... if we allowed the German people to believe (as they are already beginning to believe) that we are deliberately starving them". 56,000 people in Düsseldorf were living in bunkers, cellars and ruins.

In the year after her mayoralty she invited six Düsseldorf children to stay in Reading for three months, and set up the Reading-Düsseldorf Association to continue the connection. Many children and groups paid exchange visits over subsequent decades. A nursery school was set up in Aachen, and in July 1949 the entire Reading Youth Orchestra received a rapturous welcome in a concert in Düsseldorf. Reading was the first British town to form a link with the "enemy". Phoebe Cusden was the Chair of the Association from 1949 to 1970, and visited Düsseldorf many times, receiving various honours from the city.

== Later life ==
In 1948 Phoebe founded the Women's Peace Movement, but this was short-lived and she continued to work through the Women's International League for Peace and Freedom, of which she was an International Vice-President and for many years editor of its British magazine. She helped to set up a home for international students in Reading at Foley Hall. In 1951, George VI awarded Phoebe Cusden the MBE. By 1958 she was helping to organise support in Reading for the Campaign for Nuclear Disarmament and the second Aldermaston March (ill-health had prevented her from joining the first).

The University of Reading gave Phoebe an honorary doctorate in 1976, and in 1977 she made her last visit to Germany, when Düsseldorf awarded her its Verdienstplakette, the city's highest honour. She was active in the Reading Civic Society and, in 1977, she published Coley: Portrait of an Urban Village, a history of the Reading suburb of Coley in which she lived all her life.

A short pedestrian route in Reading is named Cusden Way, and the Reading-Düsseldorf link is commemorated by a brick and aluminium sculpture. In November 2017 a blue plaque honouring Phoebe Cusden was unveiled at her former home, 55 Castle Street Reading, a listed building. The ceremony was performed by the Mayor, Councillor Rose Williams, in the presence of Phoebe's grandchildren and some sixty-five supporters. The plaque was paid for jointly by the Reading-Dusseldorf Association, the Reading Civic Society, and Phoebe's grandchildren. Work on the Phoebe Cusden Supported Living Scheme was completed in 2017. Phoebe Cusden House provides 11 much-needed supported living flats for residents with disabilities and is owned and managed by Reading Borough Council.

Phoebe died a few weeks short of her 94th birthday in January 1981. Burgermeister Bruno Recht of Düsseldorf attended her funeral service. The Reading-Düsseldorf Association, as of 2016, is still active, and is Phoebe Cusden's chief memorial.

== Phoebe Cusden's significance ==
"a life-long local, national and international campaigner....Phoebe holds an important place in the history of "bottom-up" labour activism, and is a symbol of female emancipation during a century of women's struggle.... Phoebe demonstrated that it was possible for a committed individual of humble origins to make a significant impact in diverse areas of politics. The fact that she achieved this as a woman, and on occasions as the first female activist, makes her achievements all the more remarkable".

== Bibliography ==
- Cusden, Pheobe (1977), Coley: Portrait of an Urban Village, Reading: Workers Educational Association, ISBN 0903810026
- Partington, John S. (2010), K Gildart; D Howell (eds.), Dictionary of Labour Biography, vol. 13, Palgrave MacMillan, ISBN 978-0-230-29348-9
- Stout, Adam (1997), A Bigness of Heart – Phoebe Cusden of Reading, Reading: Reading-Düsseldorf Association, OCLC 42611931
- Letter to Phoebe Cusden from Daisy Solomon, secretary of the British Commonwealth League, concerning a temporarily suspended scheme to invite representatives of various organisations to spend three weeks attached to the League of Nations in Geneva., Berkshire Record Office Collection, 1932
