= Maiwand Lion =

War memorial sculpture in Reading, England

Coordinates: 51.456952°N 0.967481°W

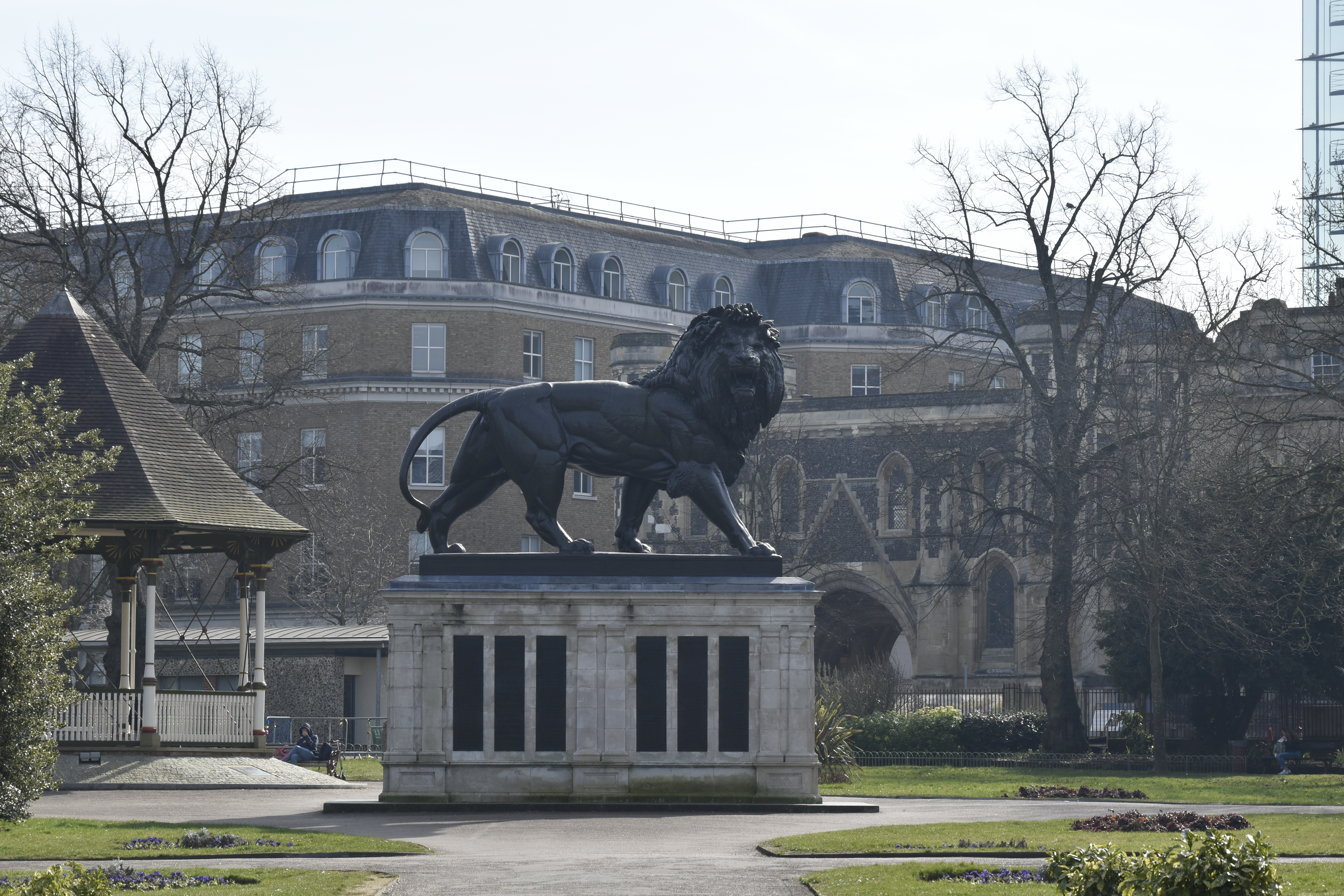
- The Maiwand Lion
- Artist: George Blackall Simonds
- Year: 1886
- Type: Sculpture
- Dimensions: 31 feet high

The Maiwand Lion is a sculpture and war memorial in the Forbury Gardens, a public park in the town of Reading, in the English county of Berkshire. The statue was named after the Battle of Maiwand and was unveiled in December 1886 to commemorate the deaths of 329 men from the 66th (Berkshire) Regiment of Foot during the campaign in the Second Anglo-Afghan War in Afghanistan between 1878 and 1880. It is sometimes known locally as the Forbury Lion.

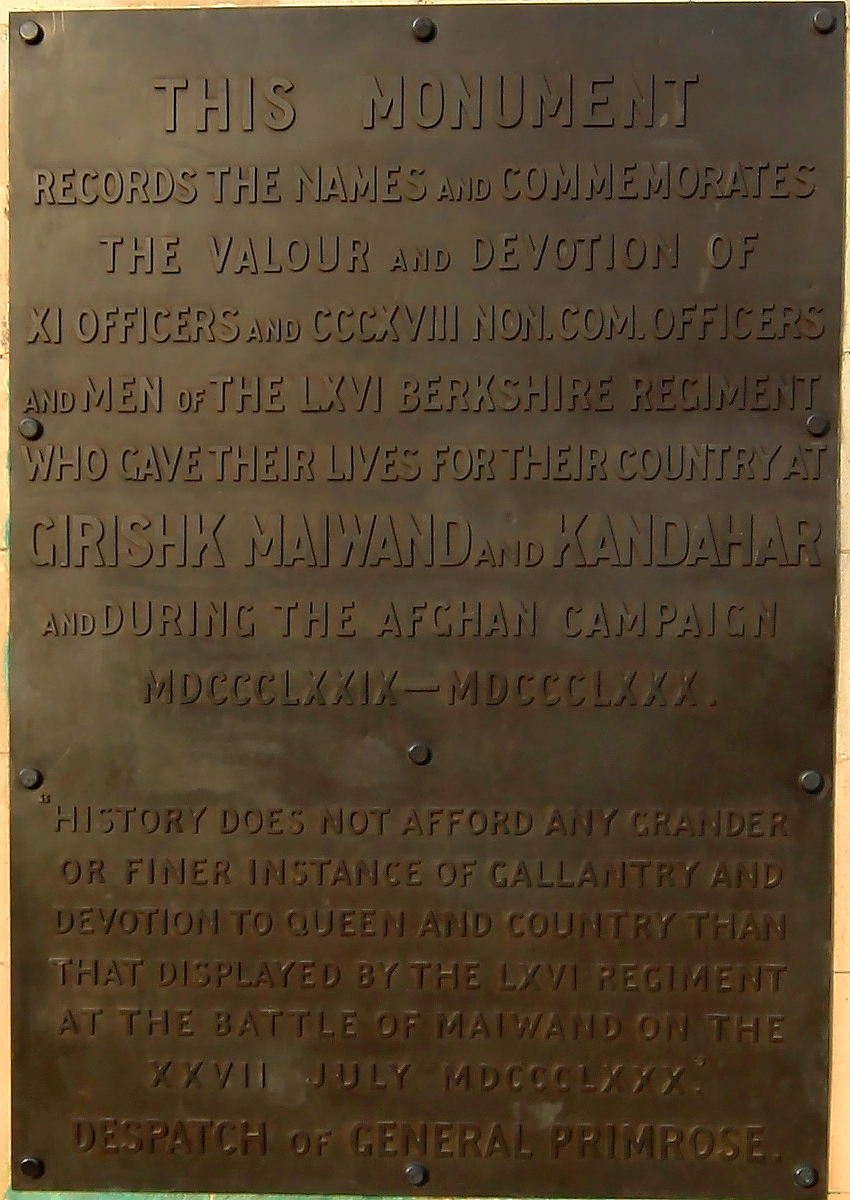
The inscription on the plinth

The inscription on the plinth reads as follows:

This monument records the names and commemorates the valour and devotion of XI [11] officers and CCCXVIII [318] non-commissioned officers and men of the LXVI [66th] Berkshire Regiment who gave their lives for their country at Girishk Maiwand and Kandahar and during the Afghan Campaign MDCCCLXXIX [1879] – MDCCCLXXX [1880].
"History does not afford any grander or finer instance of gallantry and devotion to Queen and country than that displayed by the LXVI Regiment at the Battle of Maiwand on the XXVII [27th] July MDCCCLXXX [1880]."
Despatch of General Primrose.

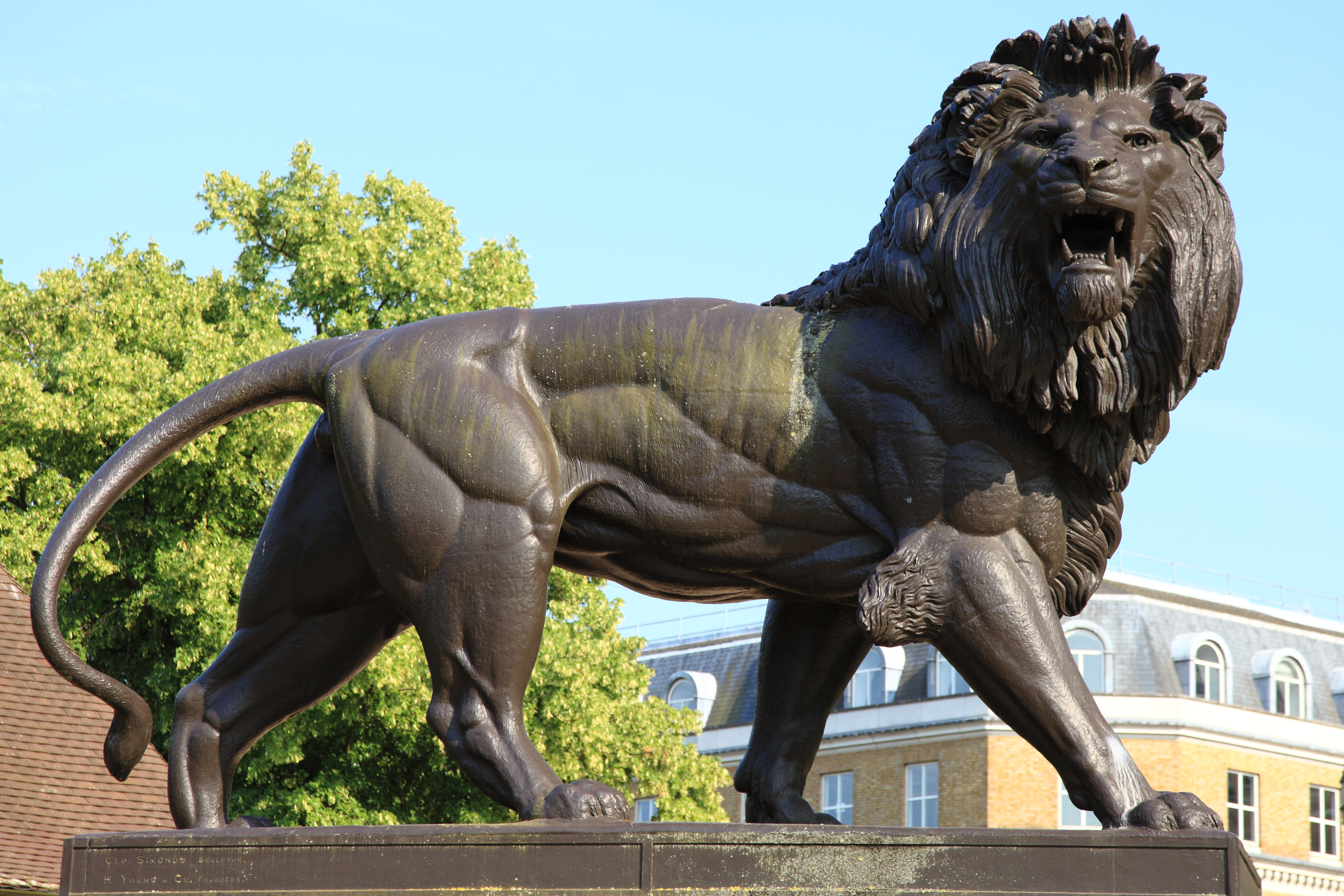
Close-up of the lion

The regiment lost approximately 258 men out of 500 (reports of the number vary, see the statue inscription total above) at the battle of Maiwand, having faced an Afghan army ten times larger than the British contingent. Eleven of the men, protecting the colours, made such a brave stand before their deaths that the Afghans who fought them reported it with great respect. Sir Arthur Conan Doyle based his character Doctor Watson on the regiment's Medical officer, Surgeon Major A F Preston, who was injured in battle.

The sculptor was George Blackall Simonds, a member of the Reading H & G Simonds brewing family. The sculpture took two years to design and complete, and the lion is one of the world's largest cast iron statues. Rumours persist that Simonds committed suicide on learning that the lion's gait was incorrectly that of a domestic cat. In fact, he made careful observations on lions at London Zoo and the stance was anatomically correct. He also lived for another 43 years, enjoying continuing success as a sculptor and later creating a statue of Queen Victoria (1887) and a statue of George Palmer (1891). He retired from sculpting in 1903 and worked in the family business, eventually becoming its chairman in 1910. In 1922 he came out of retirement to build the Bradfield war memorial, commemorating the deaths in the First World War of those in the 2nd Battalion, South Wales Borderers, which included his son.

A 3D scan of the lion

The statue is made of cast iron and weighs 16 tons. It was cast by H. Young & Co. of Pimlico in 1886 and was originally supported on a terracotta pedestal. This was replaced with Portland stone in 1910 when the terracotta showed signs of cracking under the statue's weight. The rectangular pilastered plinth carries tablets recording the names of the dead, together with inscription above. The whole monument is listed grade II by English Heritage.

The Maiwand Lion featured on the front page of one of the local newspapers, the Reading Post, prior to the publication's closure in 2014. It also appears on the Reading Football Club badge. The Loddon Brewery, located in Dunsden Green, close to Reading, brews an India Pale Ale called Forbury Lion.
