= Bradfield, Berkshire =

Coordinates: 51.449°N 1.132°W

Bradfield
- Village
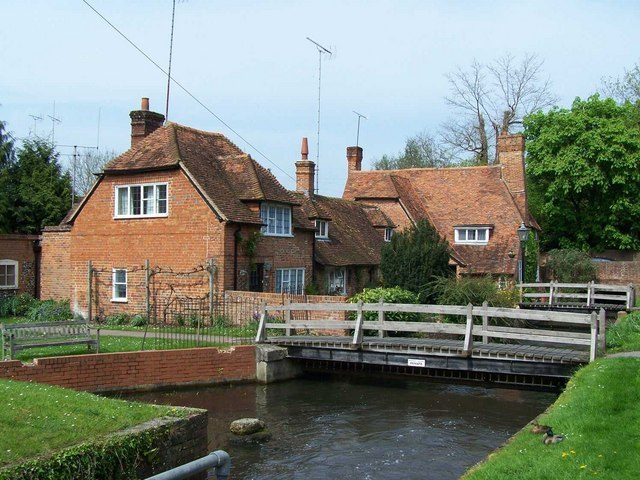
- The River Pang in Bradfield village

- Location within Berkshire
- Area: 16.67 km^{2} (6.44 sq mi)
- Population: 2,208 (2021 Census)
  - Density: 132/km^{2} (340/sq mi)
- OS grid reference: SU6073
- Civil parish: Bradfield
- Unitary authority: West Berkshire
- Ceremonial county: Berkshire
- Region: South East
- Country: England
- Sovereign state: United Kingdom
- Post town: Reading
- Postcode district: RG7
- Dialling code: 0118
- Police: Thames Valley
- Fire: Royal Berkshire
- Ambulance: South Central
- UK Parliament: Newbury

Bradfield is a village and civil parish in Berkshire, England. At the 2021 census, the parish had a population of 2,208, which was slightly more than the 2,177 recorded at the 2011 census. Aside from farms and a smaller amount of woodland its main settlements are Bradfield Southend, its medieval-founded nucleus and the hamlet of Tutts Clump. Bradfield village is the home of the public school Bradfield College.

== Location ==
Bradfield's traditional centre is on the mid-flood plain of the River Pang centred 6 miles (9.7 km) west of Reading, where the Theale to Compton road crosses the river. Bradfield Southend is centred about a mile to the south west on the gentle escarpment between the Pang and the River Kennet. Other villages and hamlets in the parish include Tutts Clump, Clay Hill and Rotten Row. There is a complex of ponds in the vicinity of the latter containing very good examples of artesian aquifers. Best known of these is 'The Blue Pool' which has delighted generations of children. In recent years, the current owners have had to deny access to the site due to fluctuating levels of pollution. Plans for better access have not yet come to fruition. To the west of Clay Hill is King's Copse, a Site of Special Scientific Interest (SSSI).

== History ==
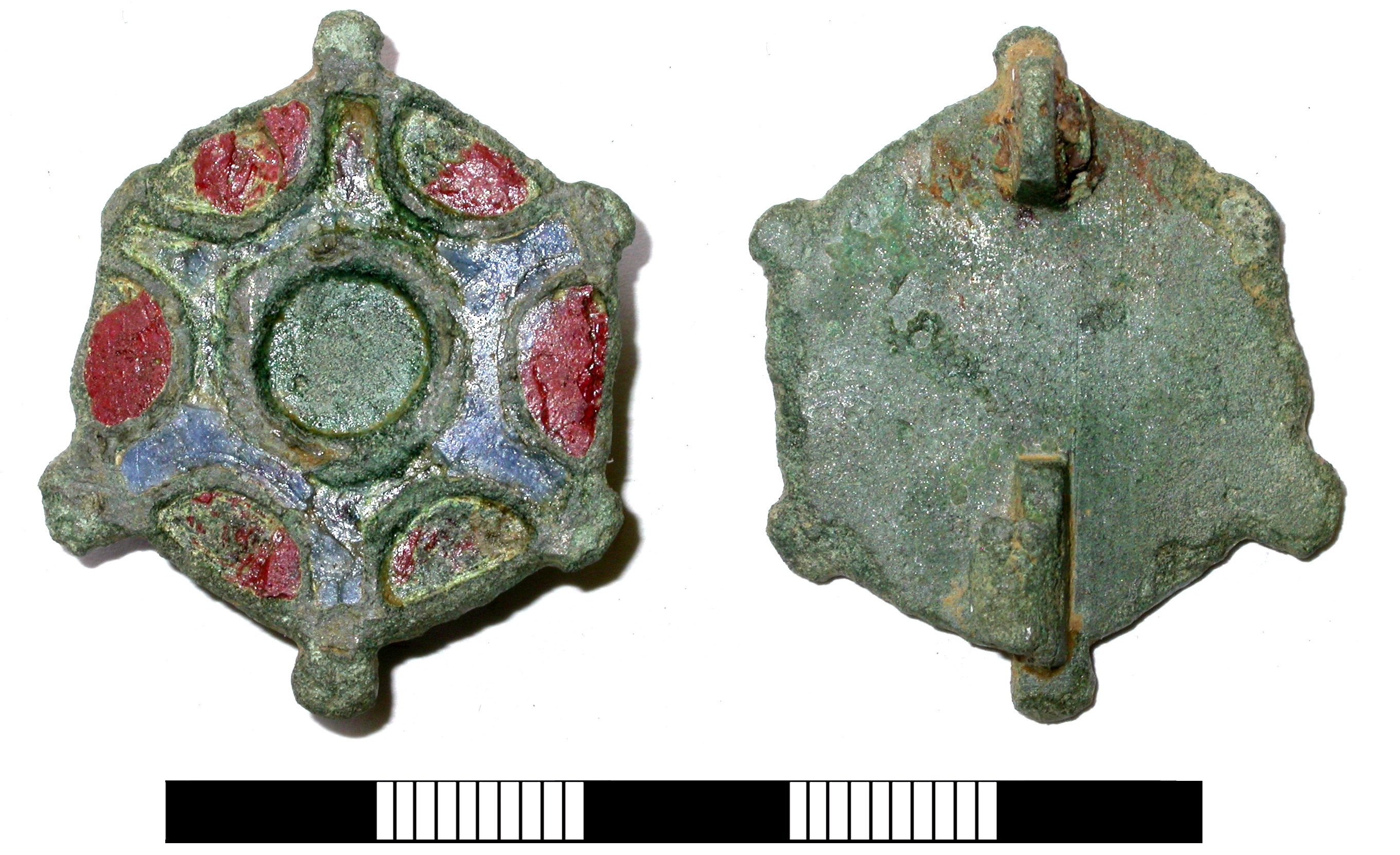
A Roman enamelled brooch, found in Bradfield and dated to c. 75 – c. 200

In the 12th-century Abingdon Chronicle, Bradenfeld is described as forming part of Abingdon Abbey in 699. The Domesday Book refers to the area as Bradefelt. The name may derive from the Anglo-Saxon brād feld meaning 'broad piece of open land'.

In the 13th century Walter of Reading, pastor of Bradfield, served as clerk to Edmund Crouchback, the king’s brother and accompanied him on a number of overseas visits.

In the mid 18th century, the village was the site of two watermills, one fewer than had been recorded in the Domesday Book 700 years prior.

In 1835, the Bradfield Poor Law Union was formed, and a workhouse, designed by Sampson Kempthorne, was built to accommodate 250 people. The small church of St Simon and St Jude was also built on the site. Between 1948 and 1991 the site was known as Wayland Hospital, a residential home for people with learning difficulties. Housing was built on the site at the end of the 20th century.

=== St Andrew's Church ===
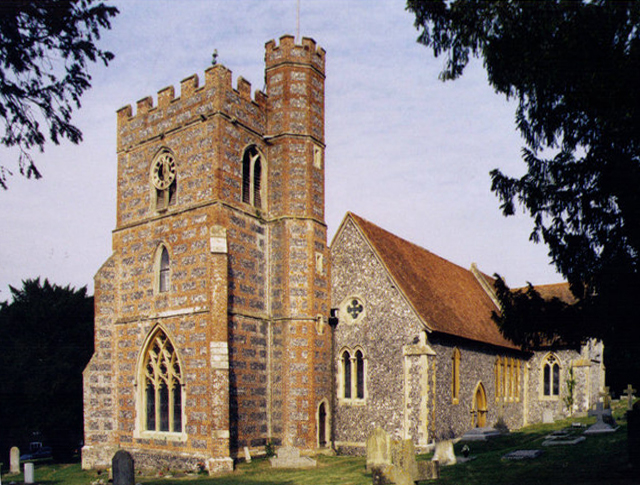
The Church of St Andrew

A church in Bradfield is first referenced in the charter of Dudley Priory in the early 12th century.

The advowson belonged to the Lord of Bradfield Manor. It passed to Thomas Stevens in 1842, who funded the restoration and rebuilding of the Church of England parish church of St Andrew by George Gilbert Scott in 1847. The 16th-century tower and 14th-century north nave predate the Victorian restoration. The church is a Grade II* listed building. Stevens went on to found Bradfield College.

In 1982, Catherine Middleton, the future Princess of Wales, was christened at St Andrew's Church.

The last service was held in the church in 2014, and it was bought from the Diocese of Oxford by Bradfield College in 2019.

=== War memorial ===
Bradfield's war memorial is the last work of George Blackall Simonds, which commemorates the deaths of members of the 2nd Battalion, South Wales Borderers in the First World War, including his son.

== Governance ==
Bradfield is a civil parish with an elected parish council which makes up the second layer of local government. It falls within the unitary authority of West Berkshire, the main layer of local government. It is in the parliament constituency of Newbury.

== Notable people ==
- Peter Nelson (1913––1998), first-class cricketer and British Army officer
- John Pordage (1607–1681), Anglican priest and Christian mystic
- Catherine Octavia Stevens (1865–1959), astronomer

== Demography ==
2011 Published Statistics: Population, home ownership
Output area	Homes owned outright	Owned with a loan	Socially rented	Privately rented	Other	Population
Civil parish	218	203	48	116	36	2177

== Local area ==
Position: grid reference SU605726 (Bradfield), SU596706 (Bradfield Southend)

Nearest town/city: Reading

Nearby villages: Theale, Stanford Dingley, Englefield, Tidmarsh, Upper Basildon, Pangbourne

== See also ==
- List of places in Berkshire
- List of civil parishes in England
