= George Blackall Simonds =

English sculptor and brewer

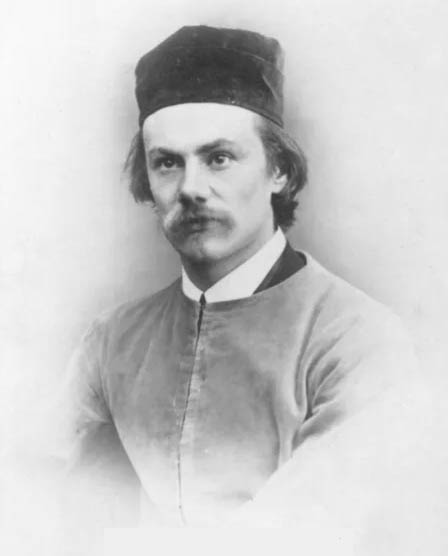
- Portrait of Simonds, 1874
- Born: 6 October 1843; Reading, England
- Died: 16 December 1929 (aged 86); Bradfield, Berkshire, England
- Known for: Sculpture
- Notable work: The Falconer (1873); Maiwand Lion (1886); Statue of Queen Victoria (1887); Statue of George Palmer (1891)

George Blackall Simonds (6 October 1843 – 16 December 1929) was an English sculptor and a director of H & G Simonds Brewery in Reading, Berkshire.

== Biography ==
George was the second son of George Simonds Senior, of Reading, director of H & G Simonds, and Mary Anne, the daughter of William Boulger of Bradfield. His grandfather was the Reading brewer and banker William Blackall Simonds. Simonds added Blackall to his name after the death of his brother, Blackall Simonds II, in 1905. He was a brother-in-law of the portrait painter John Collingham Moore and a cousin of the botanist George Simonds Boulger.

Simonds served as the inaugural Master of the Art Workers' Guild in 1884–85. His best known works are The Falconer (1873) in Central Park, New York City, and the Maiwand Lion (1886) in the Forbury Gardens, Reading, England.

In 1922, Simonds temporarily came out of retirement to build the war memorial in Bradfield, the village where he lived in Berkshire. This commemorates the deaths of local men in the First World War, including his son, a lieutenant in the 2nd Battalion the South Wales Borderers. (Note: His son, George Prescott Blackall Simonds, died aged 33 on 26 September 1914 in the opening weeks of the war. He was among the missing and is commemorated on the La Ferte-sous-Jouarre Memorial.)

In 2005, users of Reading Borough Libraries voted Simonds winner of the 'Great People of Reading' poll.

== Works ==
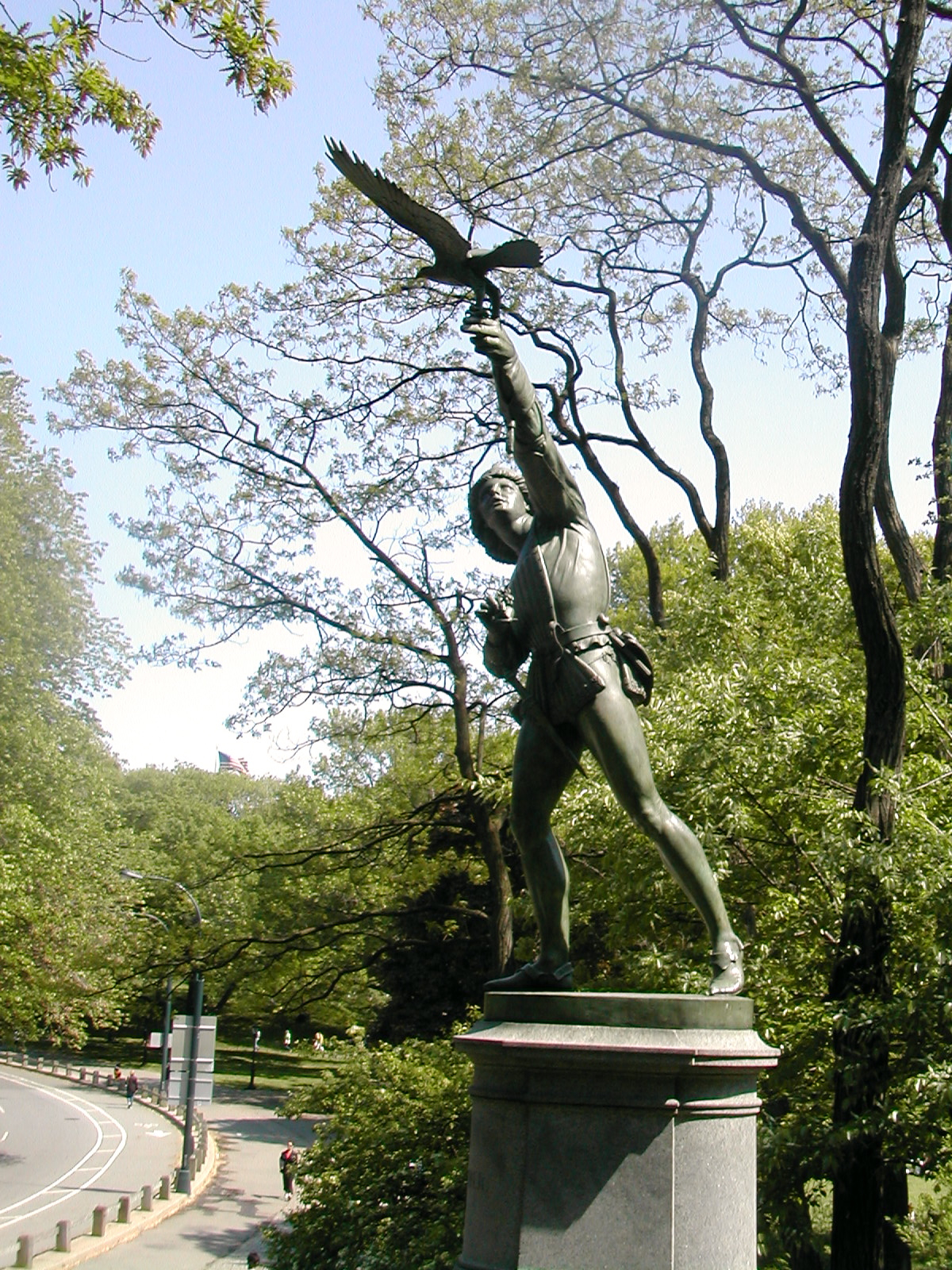
The Falconer

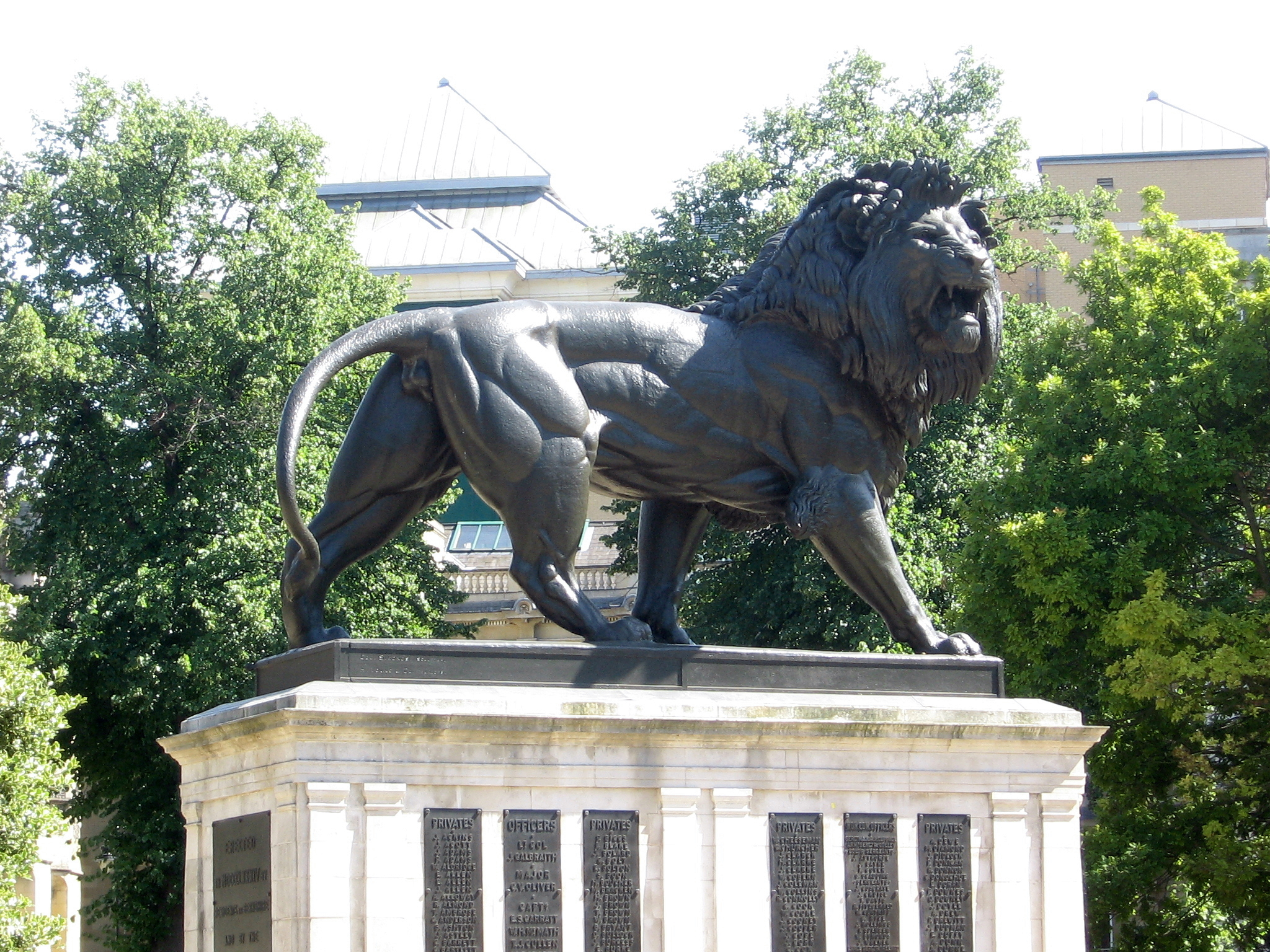
Maiwand Lion

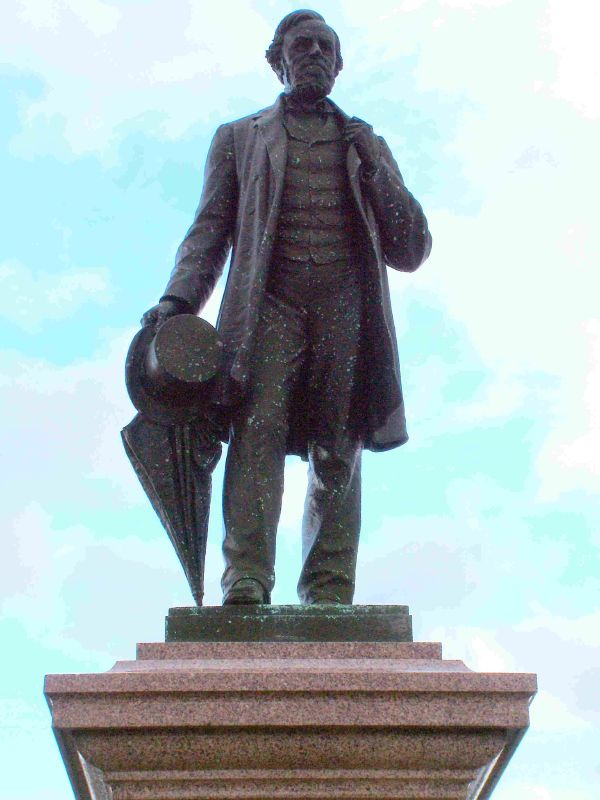
Statue of George Palmer

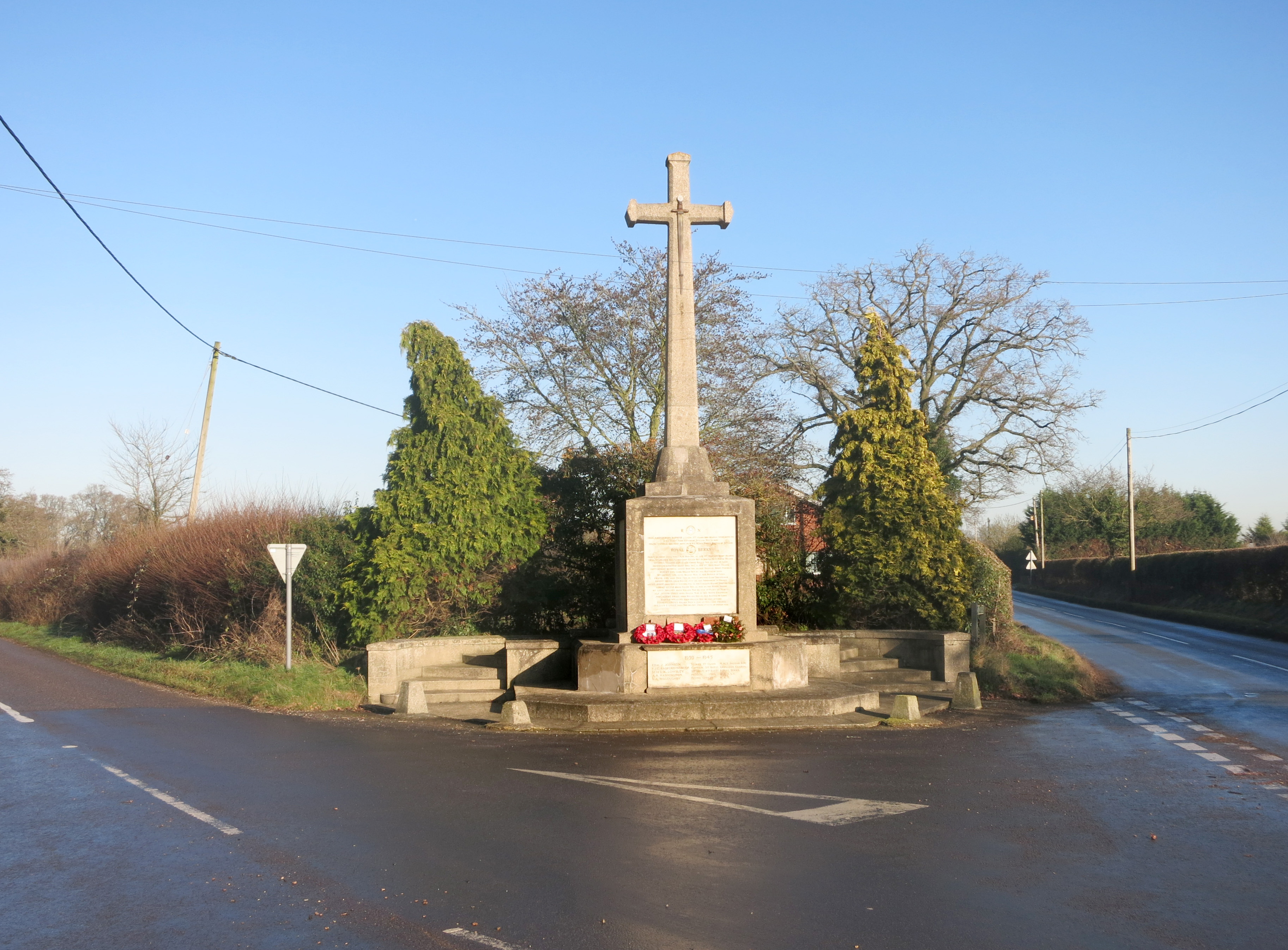
War Memorial, Bradfield

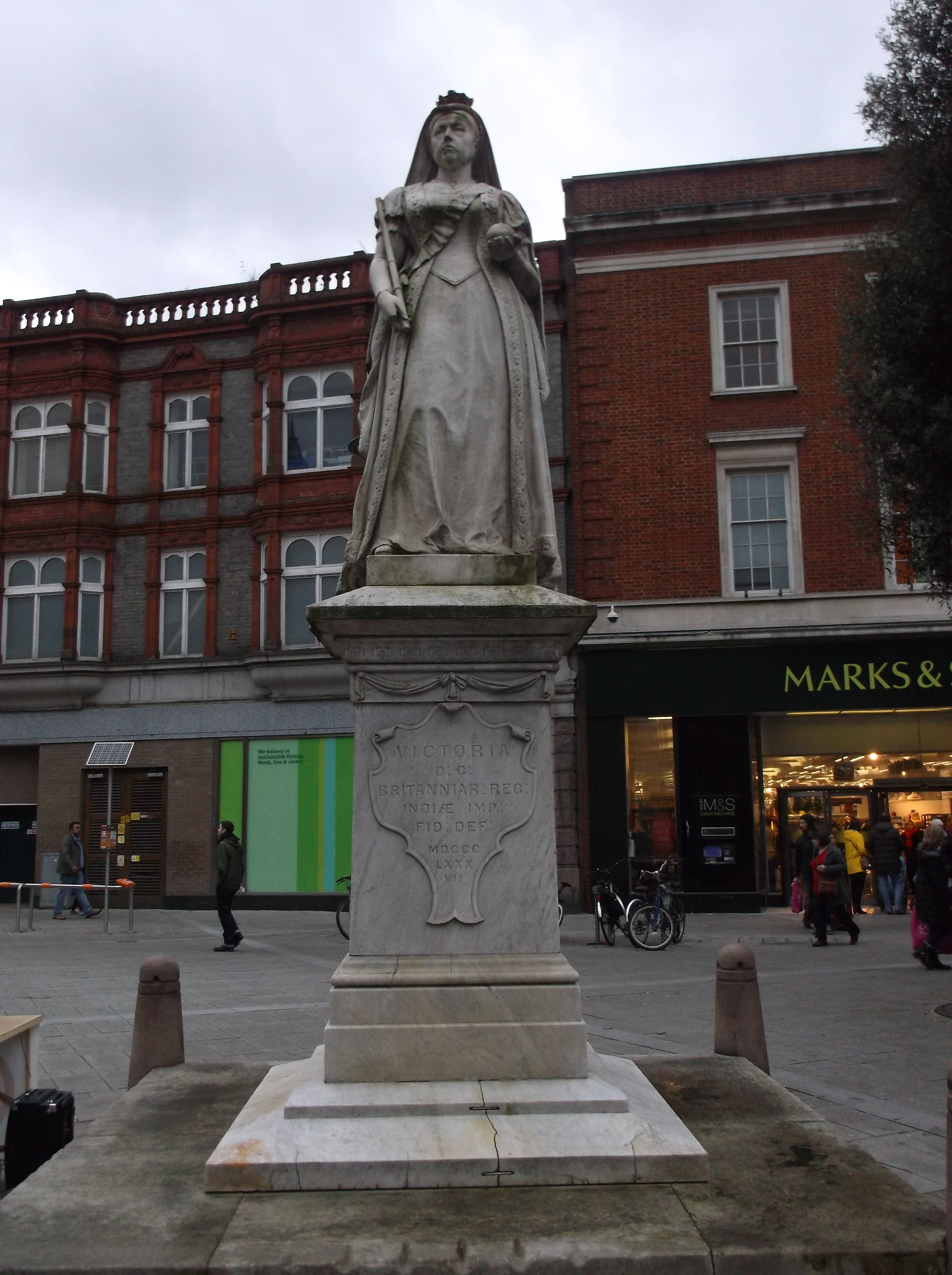
Statue of Queen Victoria, Reading

Line engraving of 1883 sculpture Perseus
