= Forbury Gardens =

Park in Reading, England

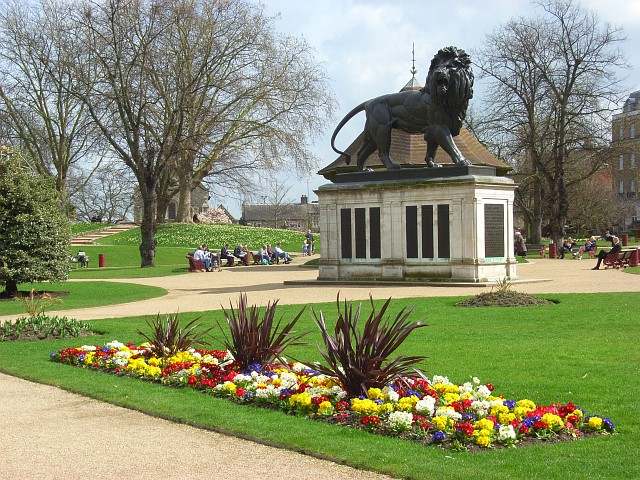
- The Maiwand Lion, with Forbury Hill behind and to the left

- Location within Berkshire
- Type: Public park
- Location: Reading, Berkshire, UK
- Coordinates: 51°27′25″N 0°58′2″W
- Operator: Reading Borough Council

Forbury Gardens is a public park in the town of Reading in the English county of Berkshire. The park is on the site of the outer court of Reading Abbey, which was in front of the Abbey Church. The site was formerly known as the Forbury, and one of the roads flanking the current gardens is still known as The Forbury. Fairs were held on the site three times a year until the 19th century.

The gardens are listed as Grade II in the English Heritage Register of Historic Parks and Gardens, and are managed by Reading Borough Council. In 2020, they were the site of a terrorist attack in which three people were killed and others injured.

Forbury, a suburb of the New Zealand city of Dunedin, was named after the gardens by early resident William Henry Valpy, who was born in Reading.

== History ==
=== Early years ===
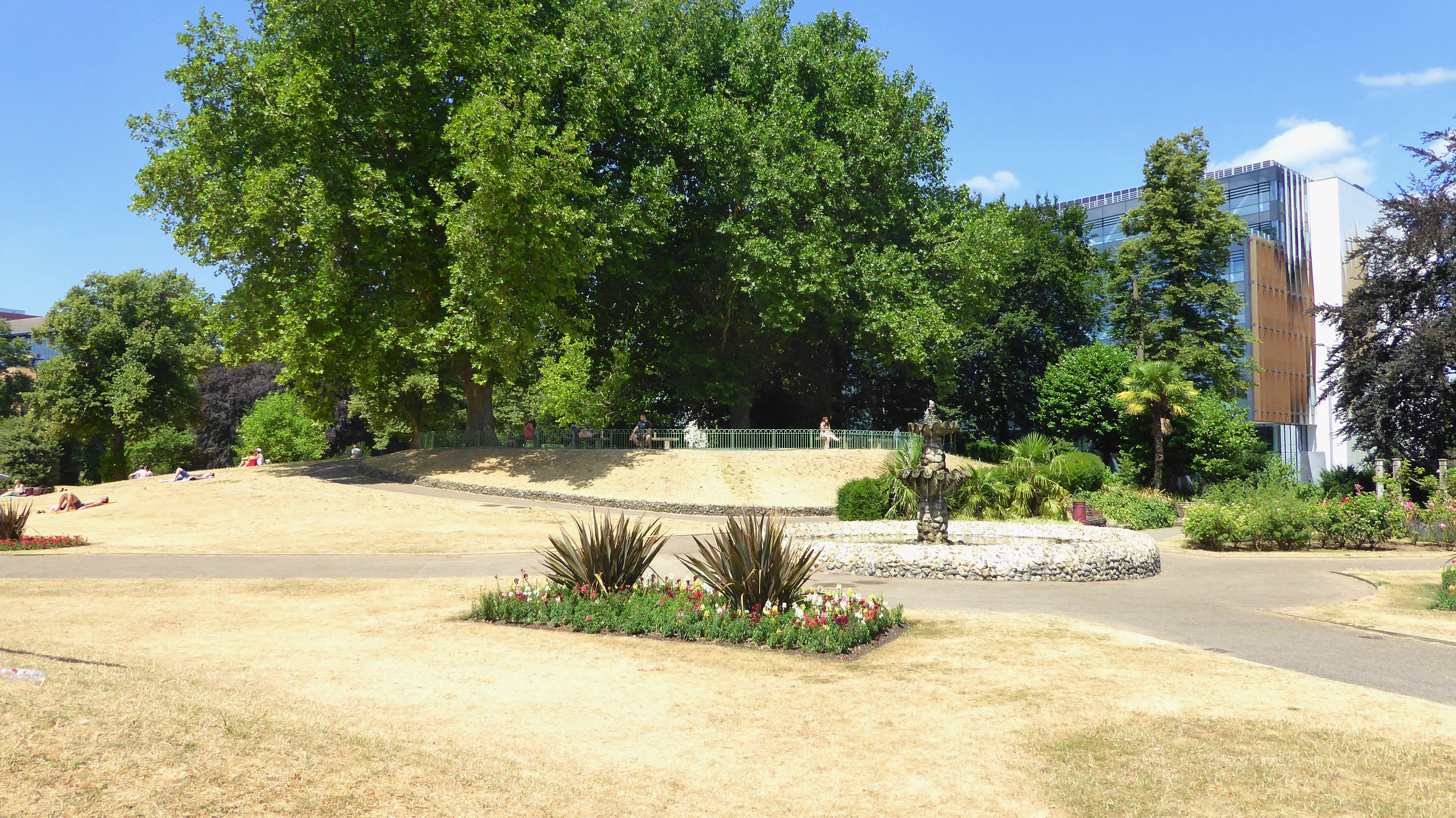
Forbury Hill, used as a gun emplacement in the civil war

Reading Abbey was founded in 1121, by Henry I, and for the next four centuries it dominated the town, becoming one of the most influential establishments in England. Like other such monasteries, Reading had a forbury, or 'borough in front', an area of open land which provided a meeting place between the Abbey and the town. The Forbury in Reading was part of the outer court of the Abbey, and provided a market place as well as a meeting place.

The abbey was largely destroyed in 1538 during Henry VIII's Dissolution of the Monasteries. The last abbot, Hugh Cook Faringdon, was tried and convicted of high treason, and hanged, drawn and quartered in front of the Abbey Church. After this, the buildings of the abbey were extensively looted, with lead, glass and facing stones removed for reuse elsewhere, and the focus of the town moved away from the Forbury.

Reading suffered badly during the English Civil War, being occupied at different times by both sides. During the Siege of Reading (1642–43), the Royalist garrison built defences that further damaged the remains of the Abbey, and Forbury Hill was used as a gun emplacement. The origins of Forbury Hill are uncertain, but core samples taken in 2017 by the University of Reading have shown that it cannot be earlier than the 13th century, and was most likely created during the Civil War using rubble from the abbey ruins.

As a result of the concerns sparked in England by the French Revolution, and throughout the ensuing Napoleonic Wars, the Forbury was used for military drills and parades, in addition to its well-established use for fairs and circuses. Three annual fairs were generally held on the Forbury, but the most significant was the Michaelmas Fair, held in September. This fair became known as the Reading Cheese Fair, although cattle, horses and hops were also sold, and it served as the principal local hiring fair.

=== 19th century ===
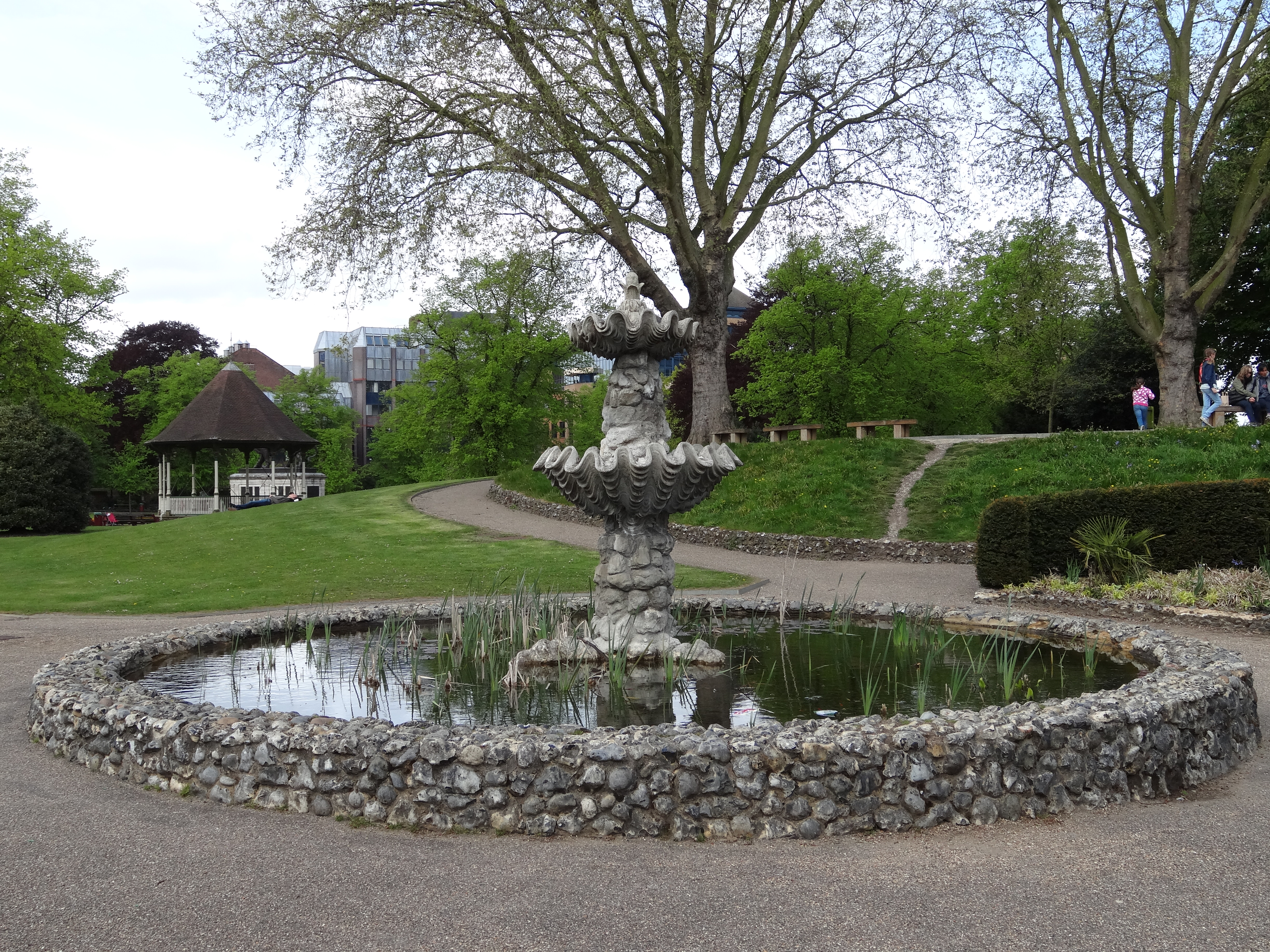
The Rustic Fountain dates from 1856 and the inauguration of the first gardens.

By the first years of the 19th century, the western part of the Forbury was in use as a playground or sports ground for Reading School, which at this time was housed in the former Hospitium of St John. However the whole of the Forbury was in private ownership, and disputes were common as to the common rights of the town and the rights of the school.

In 1854, Forbury Hill and the eastern section of the present gardens were sold to Reading Corporation at the cost of £1200, of which £400 was donated by the previous owner, a Mr Wheble. The resulting gardens were planned with a 'botanical character', a fountain and a summer house, and became known as the Pleasure Gardens. Work started in 1855 and the Pleasure Gardens opened on Easter Sunday 1856. A tunnel was built on the eastern side in 1859 to link the gardens and the Abbey ruins.

The success of the Pleasure Gardens contrasted with the situation in the western part of the Forbury, which was still used for fairs. After one fair, the area was described as being covered 'with heaps of oyster shells, manure and other refuse'. In 1860, this section of the Forbury was purchased by the town for £6010 from Colonel Blagrave. It was decided that fairs should no longer be held there, but the emphasis remained on recreational use rather than botanical display, with the area grassed except for the outside walks and a gravelled parade ground.

The common ownership notwithstanding, the two halves of the Forbury remained very different in character, and separated by a wall. However in 1869 the town purchased 12 acres (4.9 ha) of King's Meadow, the abbey's former water meadow by the River Thames, as a recreation ground. This paved the way for the incorporation, in 1873, of the western part of the Forbury into the gardens, which then became known as Forbury Gardens.

The Maiwand Lion statue was erected in 1886 to commemorate the loss of 286 soldiers (though the exact number varies by account) from the 66th Royal Berkshire Regiment at the Battle of Maiwand in Afghanistan on 27 July 1880. The sculptor of this 31-foot statue was George Blackall Simonds and it was unveiled in December 1886. It is sometimes known locally as the Forbury Lion.

The Victoria Gates at the south west corner of the gardens commemorate Queen Victoria's Diamond Jubilee in 1897.

=== 20th century ===
A grey stone cross on a small mound was erected in 1909, in memory of Henry I, on the north-west corner of the footings of the Abbey Church.

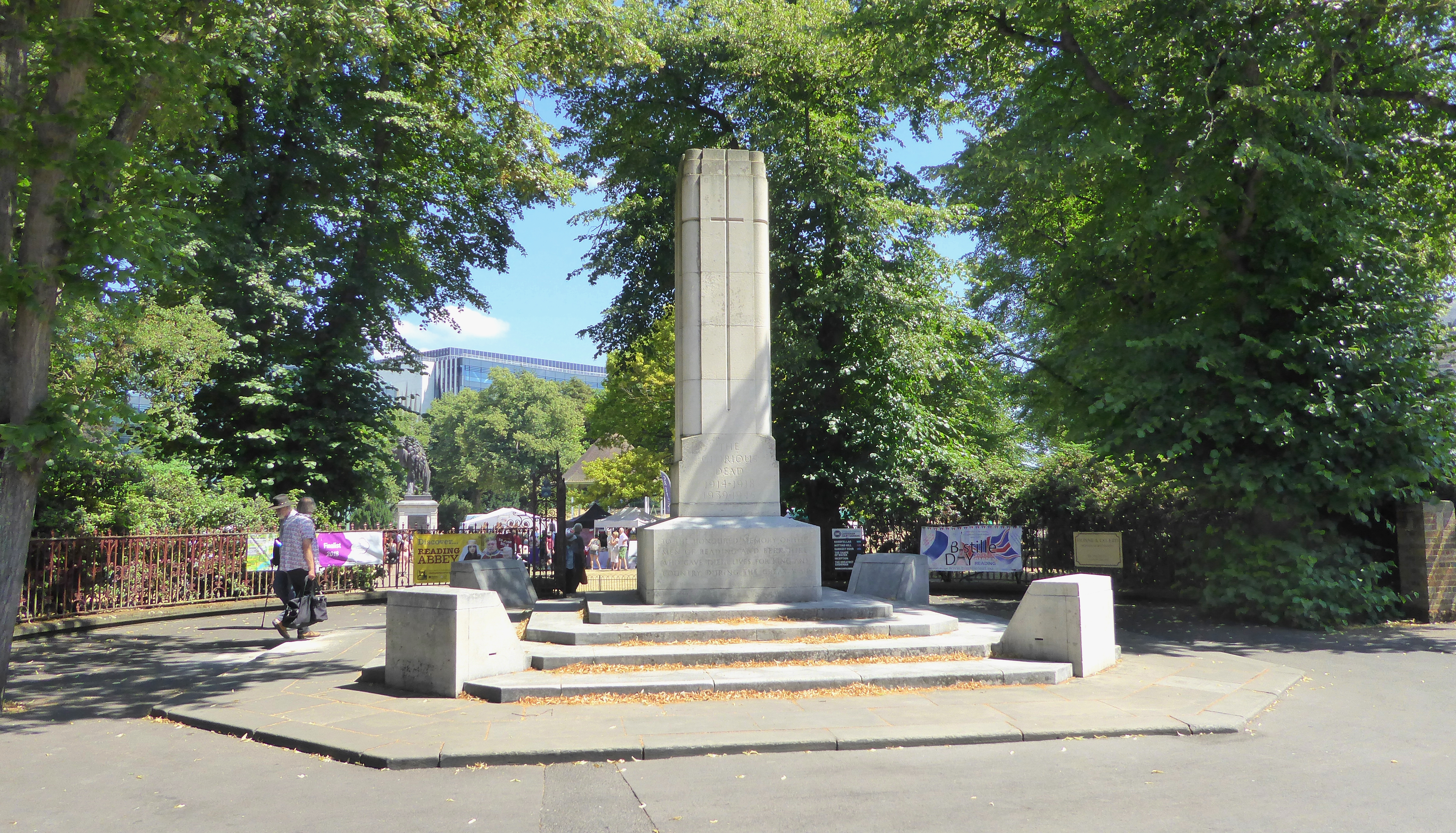
The Reading Cenotaph, with the Victoria Gates and gardens behind

The Verdun Oak was planted in July 1919 to commemorate the restoration of peace after the First World War. It is one of a number of Verdun trees in the United Kingdom which are grown from acorns and other seeds collected from the battlefield at Verdun. It lies between the Maiwand Lion and the Victoria Gate, and has grown to become an attractive, broadly spreading tree.

The Reading Cenotaph, a stone memorial column that commemorates the dead of Reading and Berkshire in the First World War, was erected in 1932 outside the Victoria Gates of the gardens. It is to a design by Edward Leslie Gunston, and still forms the centre-piece for Reading's commemoration of Armistice Day each year.

=== 21st century ===
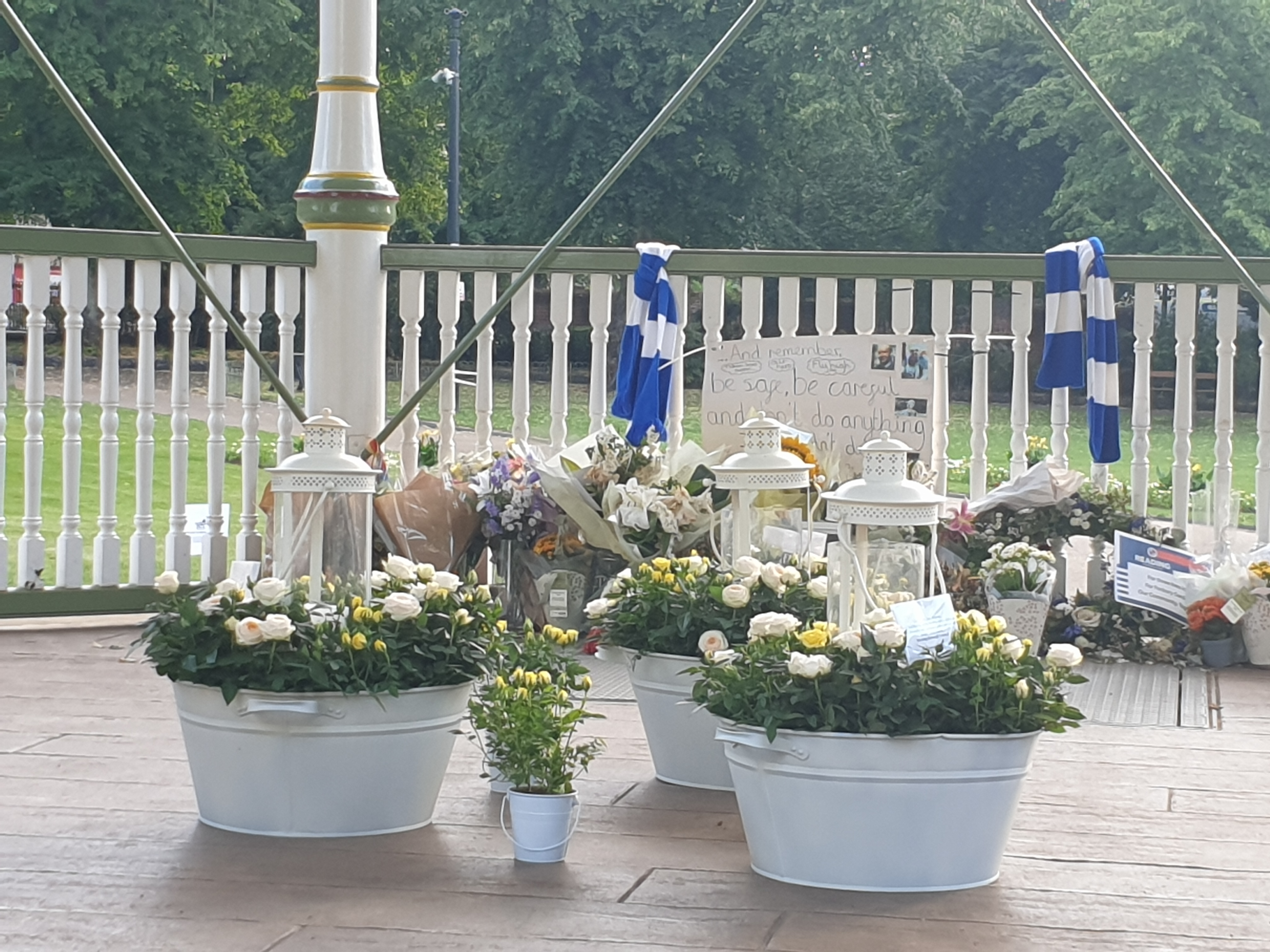
Flowers on the bandstand in memory of the three victims of the 2020 attack

In 2004-5, the gardens underwent a one-year restoration project. The Heritage Lottery Fund awarded Reading Borough Council £2.13 million to restore the historic features of the Forbury Gardens and improve safety and access for visitors. Work in the gardens included the restoration of the Maiwand Lion, the bandstand, water feature and the garden's walls, fencing and gateways. A new Keeper's Lodge was also constructed, including a refreshment kiosk, public toilets and facilities for a resident gardener. A grand re-opening event took place on 14 May 2005 to mark the completion of the project.

In 2015, a statue was unveiled to the memory of Trooper Fred Potts VC, who was awarded the Victoria Cross in October 1915 after endangering his own life to drag a wounded comrade from the battlefield at the Battle of Scimitar Hill. The statue is just outside the garden wall, facing the Crown Court building. In the same year, the Reading International Brigade Memorial was relocated from the Civic Centre to the east side of the gardens, and rededicated. This sculpture by Eric Stanford is a memorial to those lost in the Spanish Civil War and preparatory sketches are held by the University of Reading.

On 20 June 2020, three people were killed and three others seriously injured in a mass stabbing in the gardens. The incident was treated as a terrorist incident; its perpetrator was later sentenced to a whole-life term. After the attack, the gardens were closed to the public for three weeks to facilitate the police investigation. Following the reopening, flowers, originally laid by members of the public in various locations around the town, were moved to surround the garden's bandstand.

In 2023, the garden's bandstand underwent a significant refurbishment, with the structure being conserved and repainted in the original colours of white and green and the previously grassed slopes around the podium replaced with cobbles. The cobbled structure incorporates a memorial to the victims of the 2020 attack, which was unveiled during a memorial service on 20 June 2023, marking the third anniversary of the attack.

== The gardens today ==
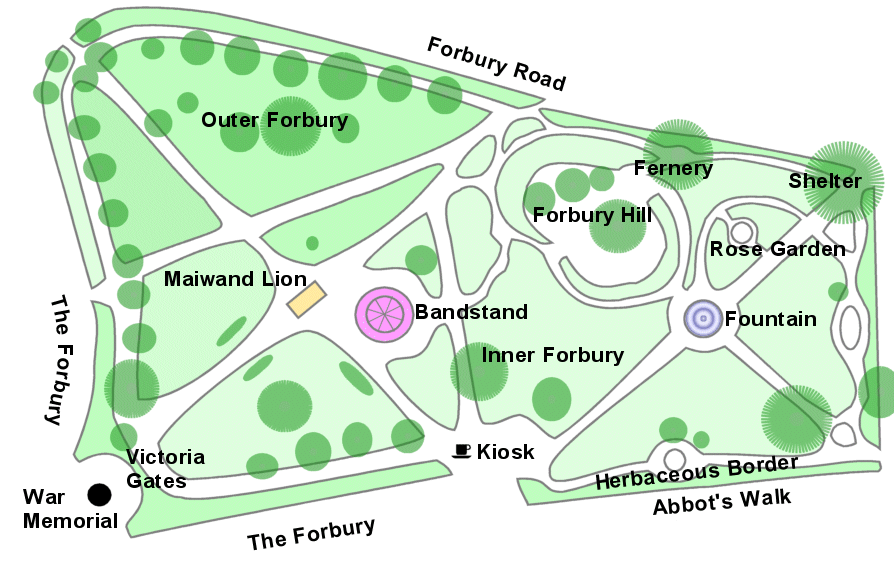
Map of Forbury Gardens today

Besides the landscaping and planting of the gardens, the principal features are the Bandstand, the Maiwand Lion, the Forbury Hill, and the Rustic Fountain. Facilities include a refreshment kiosk and public toilets. Closed-circuit cameras monitor the whole Gardens area, in a bid to deter drug use and anti-social behaviour. The garden has received a Green Flag Award for being welcoming, safe, well maintained and involving the community.

The Forbury Hill is now accessible by two winding footpaths (wheelchair-accessible) that lead to an area that is elevated about 3 metres (9.8 ft) above the surrounding gardens. A single plane tree stands in the middle, and around the outer edge of the top of the hill are wooden seats. A short tunnel in the south-east corner of the gardens provides traffic free access to the ruins of Reading Abbey.

Reading Borough Council organises summer concerts in the bandstand on Sunday afternoons during July and August. The gardens are also used for various civic and community events, including the Reading Town Meal, the Reading Water Fest and a revived Reading Cheese Fair.

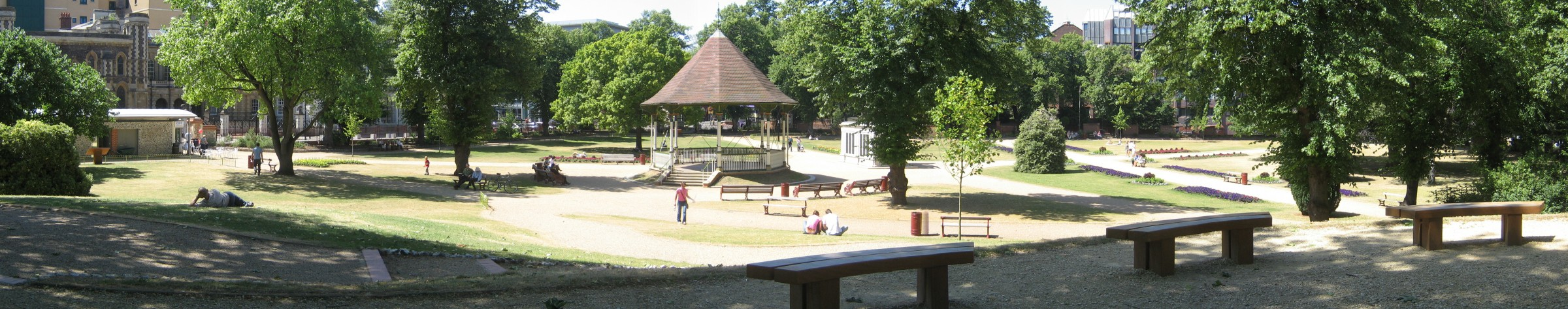
Panorama of Forbury Gardens from the top of Forbury Hill, looking to the west. On the left is the refreshment kiosk, in centre is the bandstand. The Maiwand Lion statue is obscured by the tree just right of centre

== See also ==
- List of parks and open spaces in Reading, Berkshire
