= Reading, Berkshire =

Town and borough in Berkshire, England

Reading Borough of Reading
- Town, borough and unitary authority
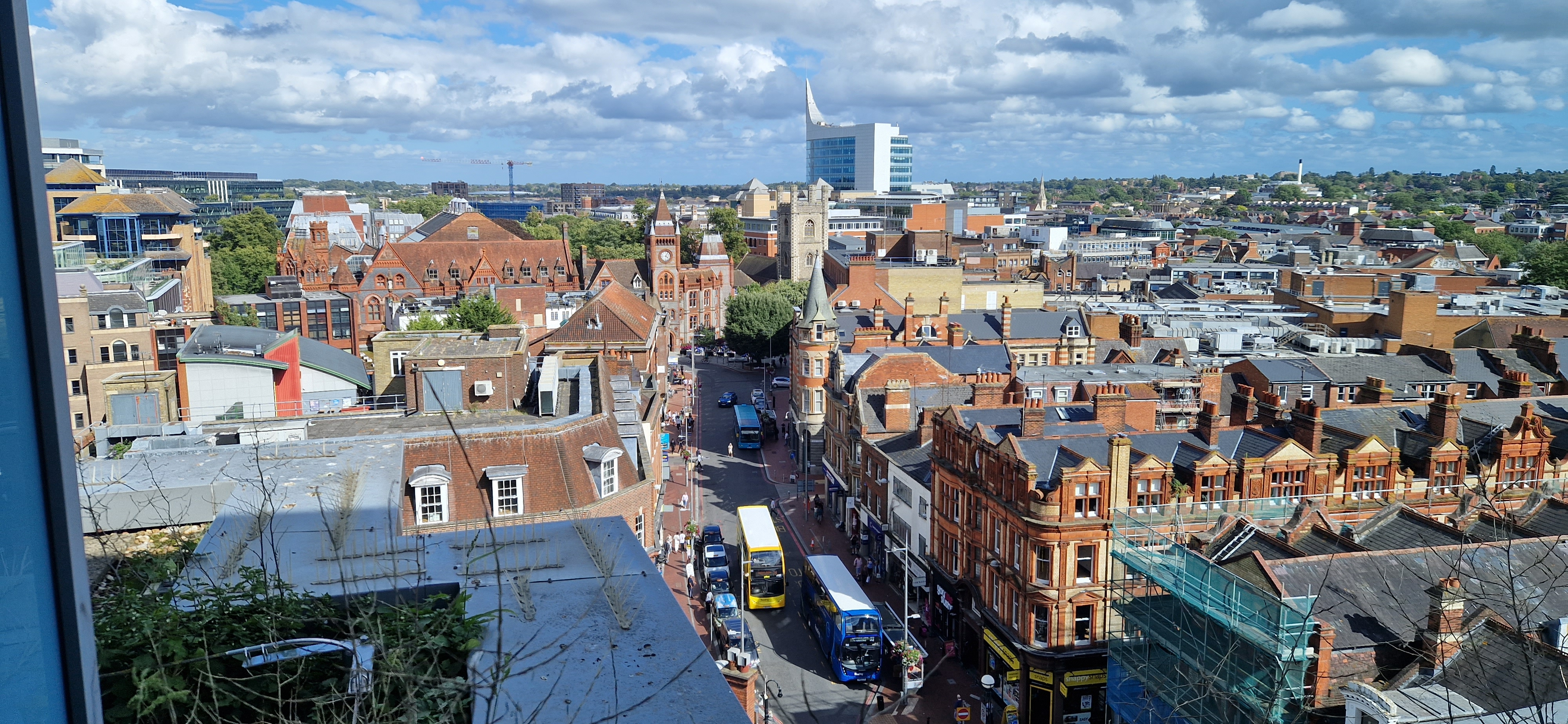
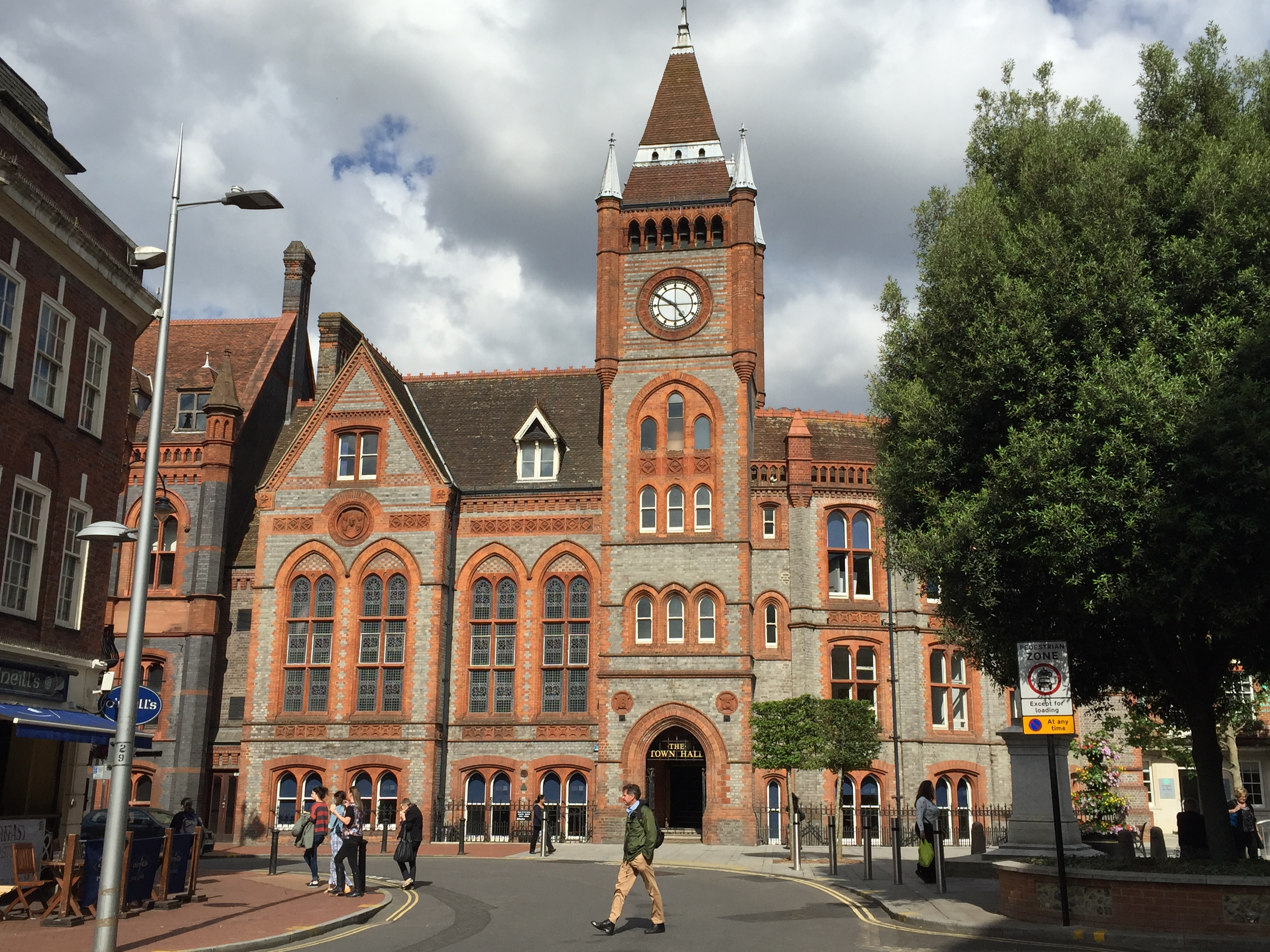
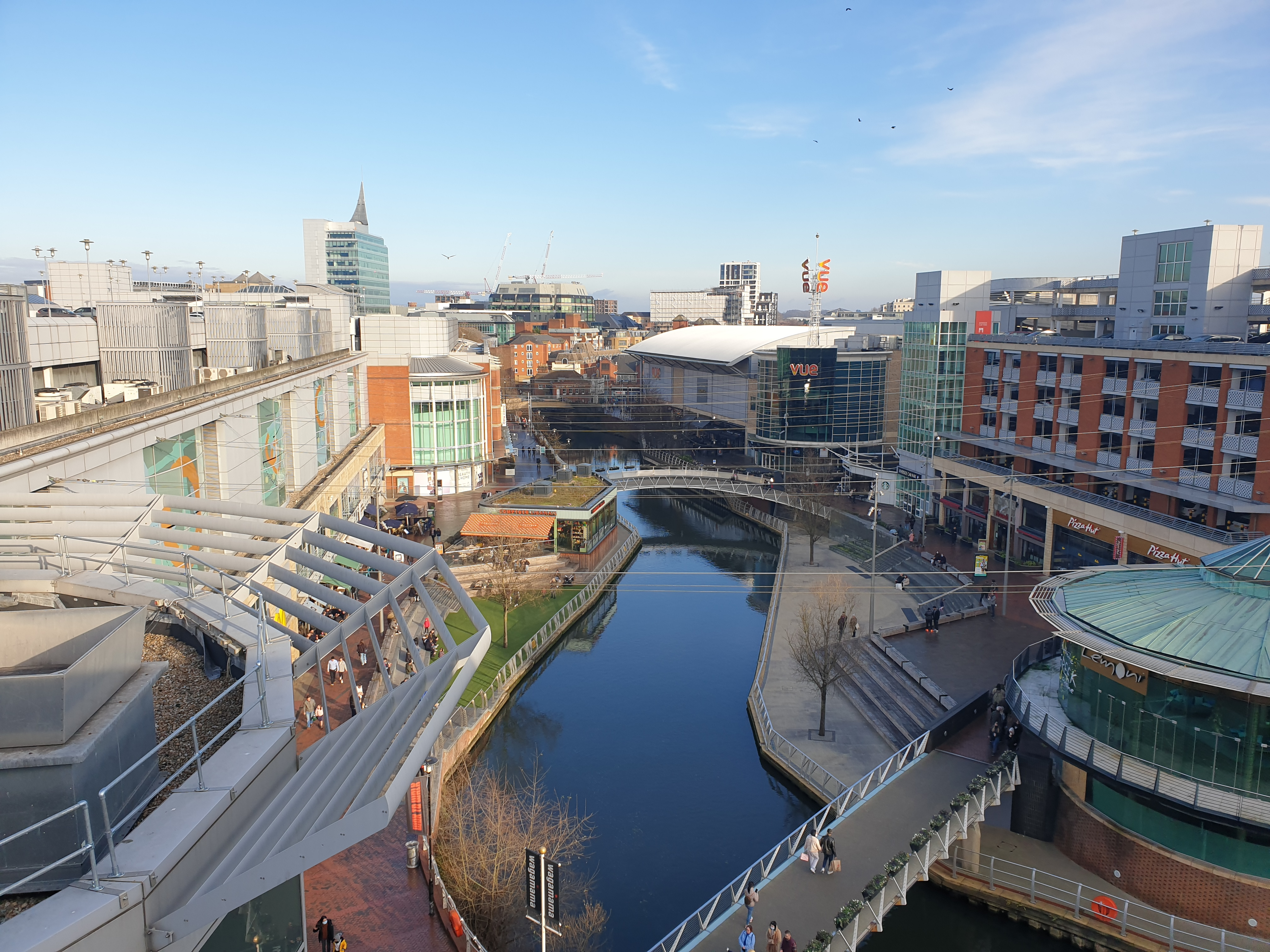
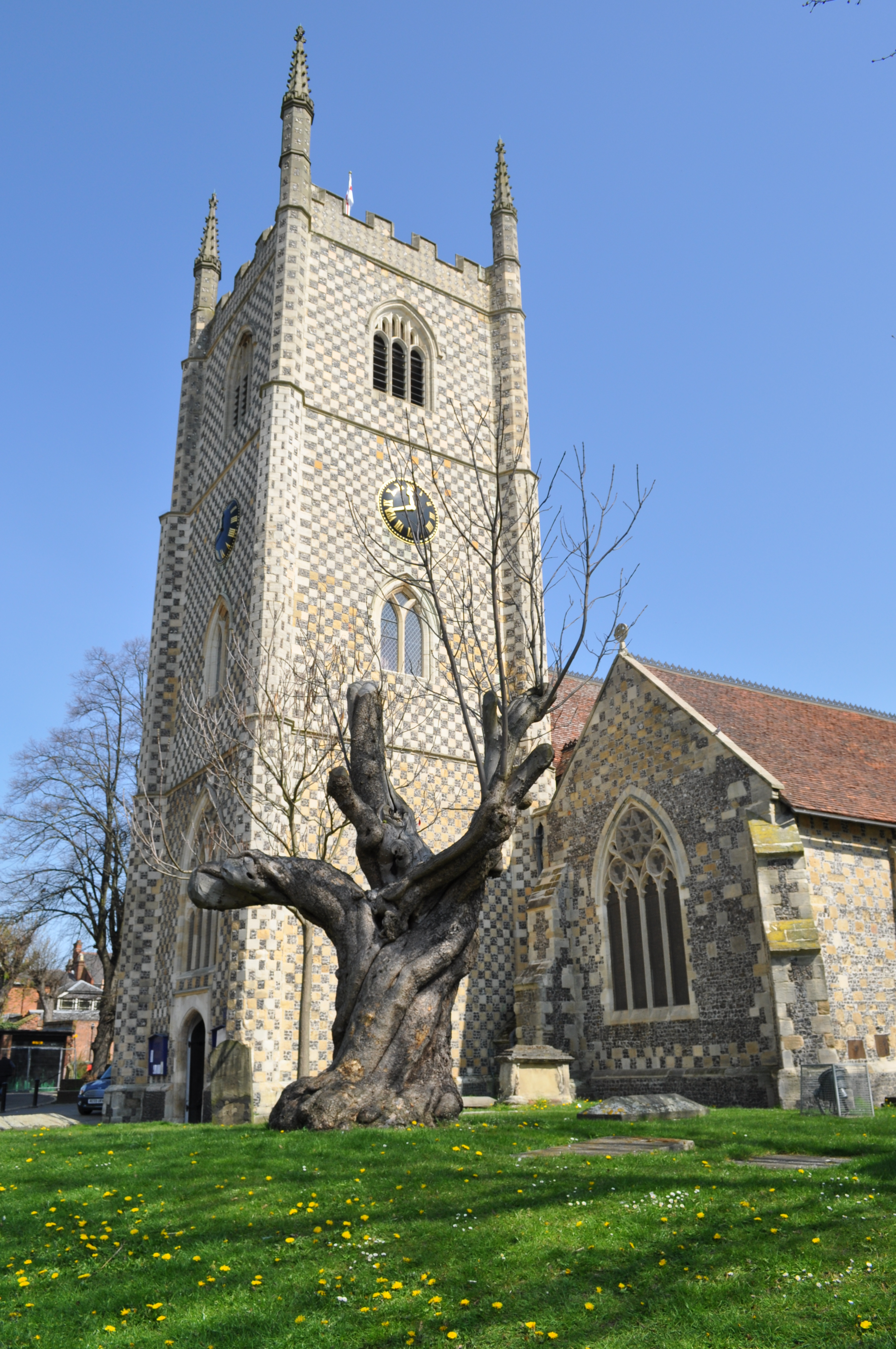
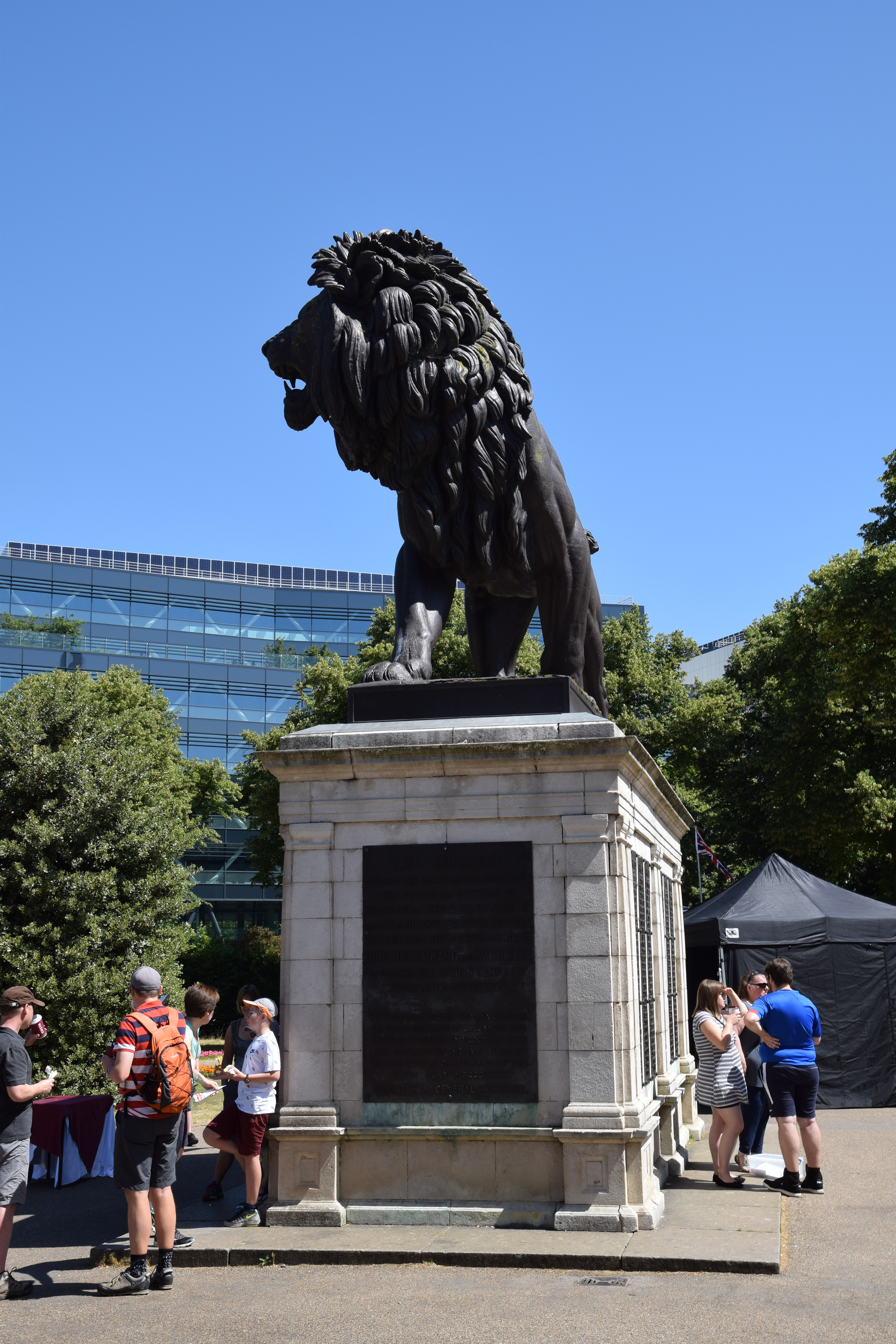
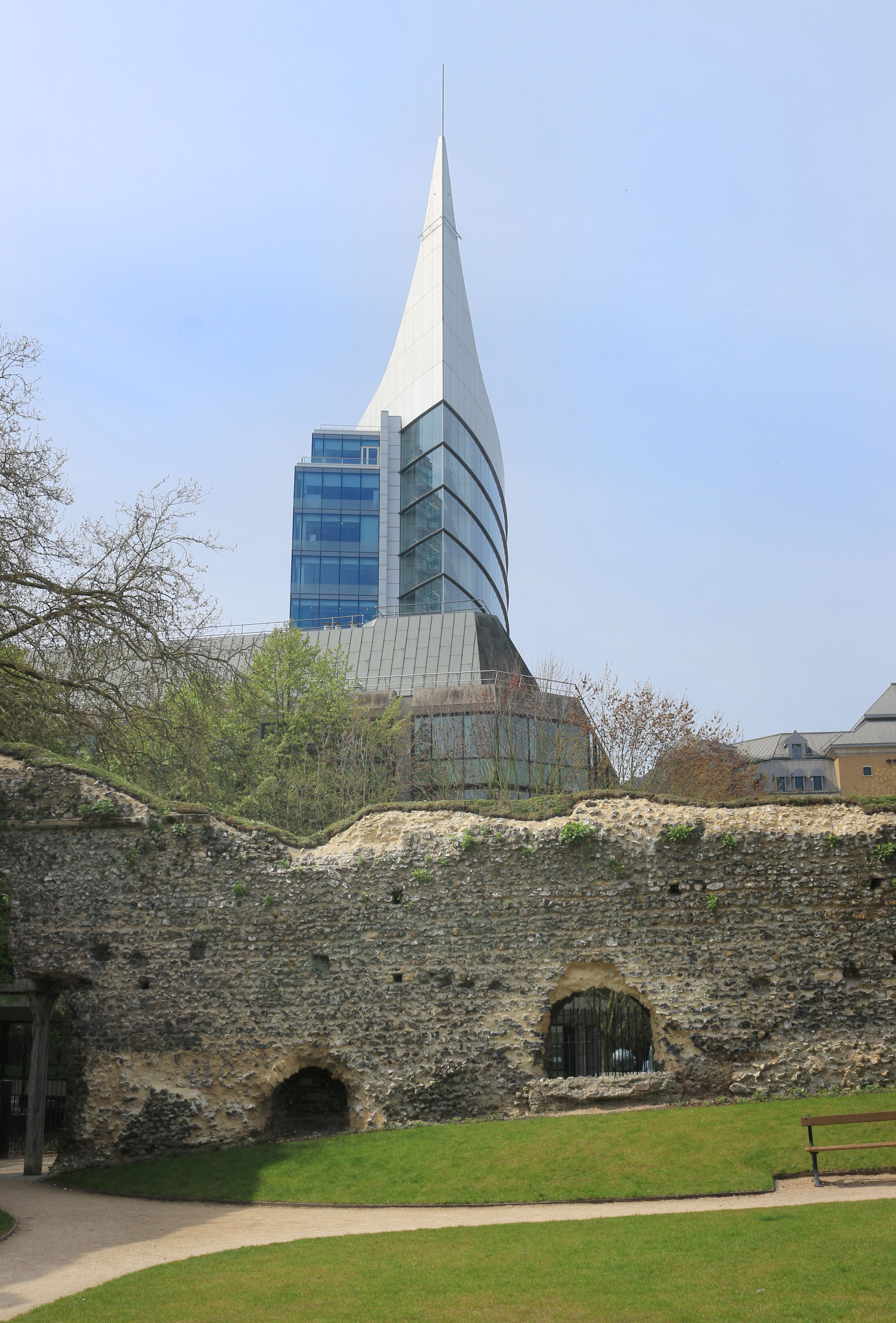
- East Reading Skyline Reading Town Hall Oracle Riverside Reading Minster The Maiwand Lion Reading Abbey and The Blade

- Coat of arms of Reading Borough Council
- Motto: A Deo et Regina; With God and Queen
- Borough of Reading shown within Berkshire
- Interactive map showing borough boundary
- Location within England
- Coordinates: 51°27′15″N 0°58′23″W
- Sovereign state: United Kingdom
- Constituent country: England
- Region: South East England
- Ceremonial county: Berkshire
- Historic county: Berkshire (south Thames); Oxfordshire (north Thames)
- Admin HQ: Reading
- Settled: 871 or earlier
- Town status: 1086 or earlier
- Areas of the town: List: Calcot (Village); Caversham (Town); Caversham Heights; Caversham Park Village; Central Reading (Town and Suburb); Christchurch Meadows; Coley; Coley Park (Village); Earley (Town); East Reading; Emmer Green; Fords Farm; Green Park; Holybrook; Katesgrove; Lower Caversham; Lower Earley (part); Newtown; Norcot (Village); Purley-on-Thames (Village); Sandford (part); Sonning (Suburb); Southcote; Tilehurst (Village) (part); West Reading; Whitley; Whitley Wood; Winnersh (Village) (part); Woodley (Town)

Government
  - Type: Unitary authority
  - Body: Reading Borough Council
  - MP: Matt Rodda (L); Olivia Bailey (L); Yuan Yang (L)
- Elevation: 61 m (200 ft)

Population (2025)
  - Borough: 183,762
  - Rank: 118th (of 296) (borough)
  - Density: 4,549/km^{2} (11,780/sq mi)
  - Urban: 355,596
- Demonym: Redingensian

Ethnicity (2021)
  - Ethnic groups: List: 67.1% White; 17.7% Asian; 7.2% Black; 5.1% Mixed; 2.9% other

Religion (2021)
  - Religion: List: 39.6% Christianity; 36.3% no religion; 15.2% other; 8.9% Islam
- Time zone: UTC+0 (GMT)
  - Summer (DST): UTC+1 (BST)
- Postal code: RG
- Area code: 0118
- Grid Ref.: SU713733
- ONS code: 00MC (ONS); E06000038 (GSS)
- ISO 3166-2: GB-RDG
- NUTS 3: UKJ11
- Website: reading.gov.uk

Reading (/ˈrɛdɪŋ/ RED-ing) is a town and borough in Berkshire, England, and the county town of Berkshire. It is Berkshire's largest town, with a total population of 203,795 in its built-up area as of 2021. Most of its built-up area lies within the Borough of Reading, although some outer suburbs are parts of neighbouring local authority areas. It is located in the Thames Valley at the confluence of the rivers Thames and Kennet.

Reading is a major commercial centre, especially for information technology and insurance. It is also a regional retail centre, serving a large area of the Thames Valley with its shopping centres, including the Oracle, the Broad Street Mall, and the pedestrianised area around Broad Street. It is home to the University of Reading. Every year it hosts the Reading Festival, one of England's biggest music festivals. Reading has a professional association football team, Reading F.C., and participates in many other sports.

Reading dates from the 8th century. It was a trading and ecclesiastical centre in the Middle Ages, the site of Reading Abbey, one of the largest and richest monasteries of medieval England with royal connections, of which the 12th-century abbey gateway and significant ancient ruins remain. By 1525, Reading was the largest town in Berkshire, and tenth in England for taxable wealth. The town was seriously affected by the English Civil War, with a major siege and loss of trade, but played a pivotal role in the Glorious Revolution, whose only significant military action was fought on its streets. The 18th century saw the beginning of a major ironworks in the town and the growth of the brewing trade for which Reading was to become famous. The 19th century saw the coming of the Great Western Railway and the development of the town's brewing, baking and seed-growing businesses, and the town grew rapidly as a manufacturing centre.

== Etymology ==
The earliest known name for Reading is Readingas, from the 8th century. The name probably comes from the Readingas, an Anglo-Saxon tribe whose name means Reada's People in Old English (the Anglo-Saxons often had the same name for a place and its inhabitants).

The demonym for a person from Reading is Redingensian, giving the name of the local rugby team Redingensians, based in Sonning, and of former members of Reading School.

== History ==
=== Origins ===
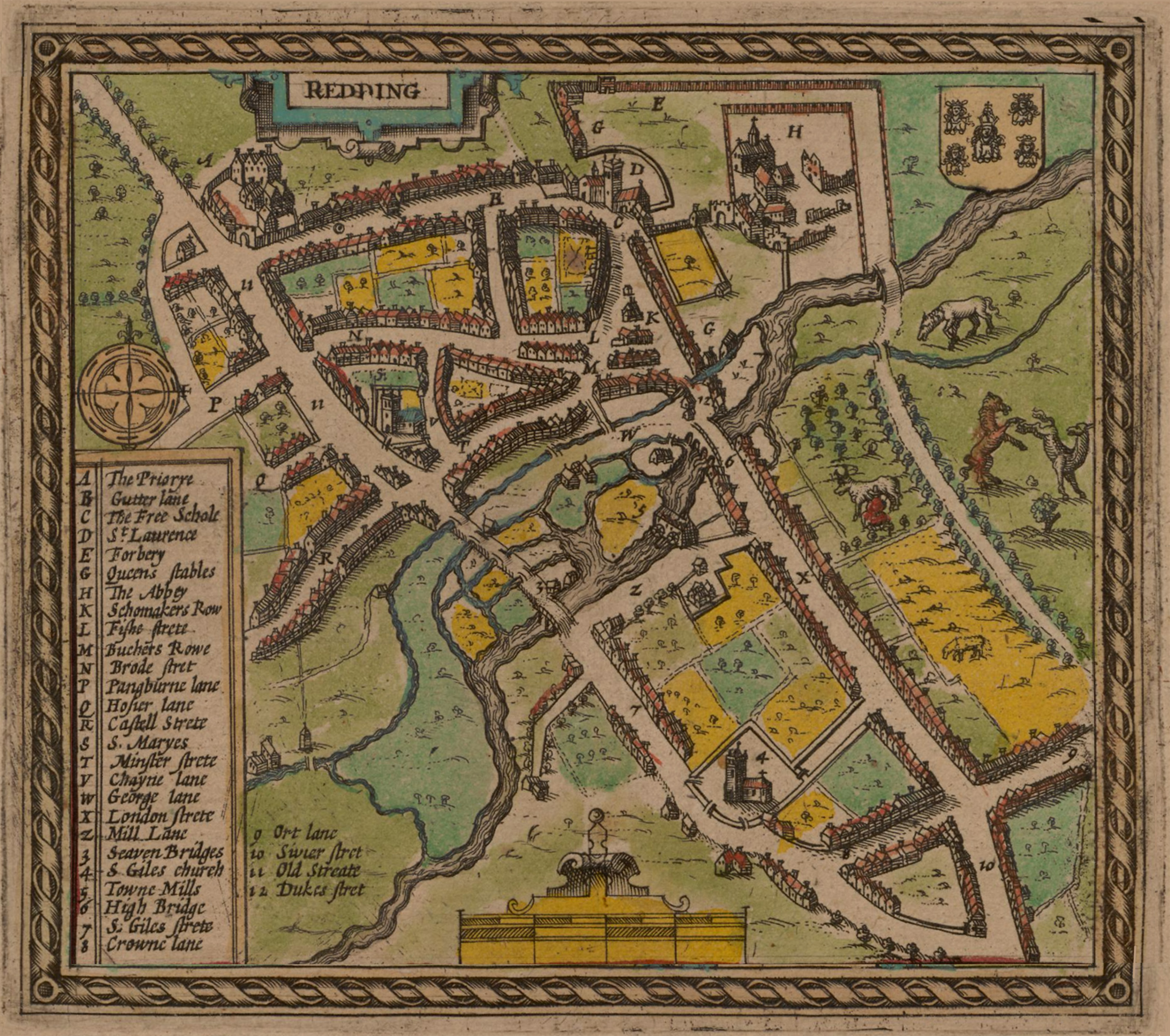
The earliest map of Reading, published in 1611 by John Speed

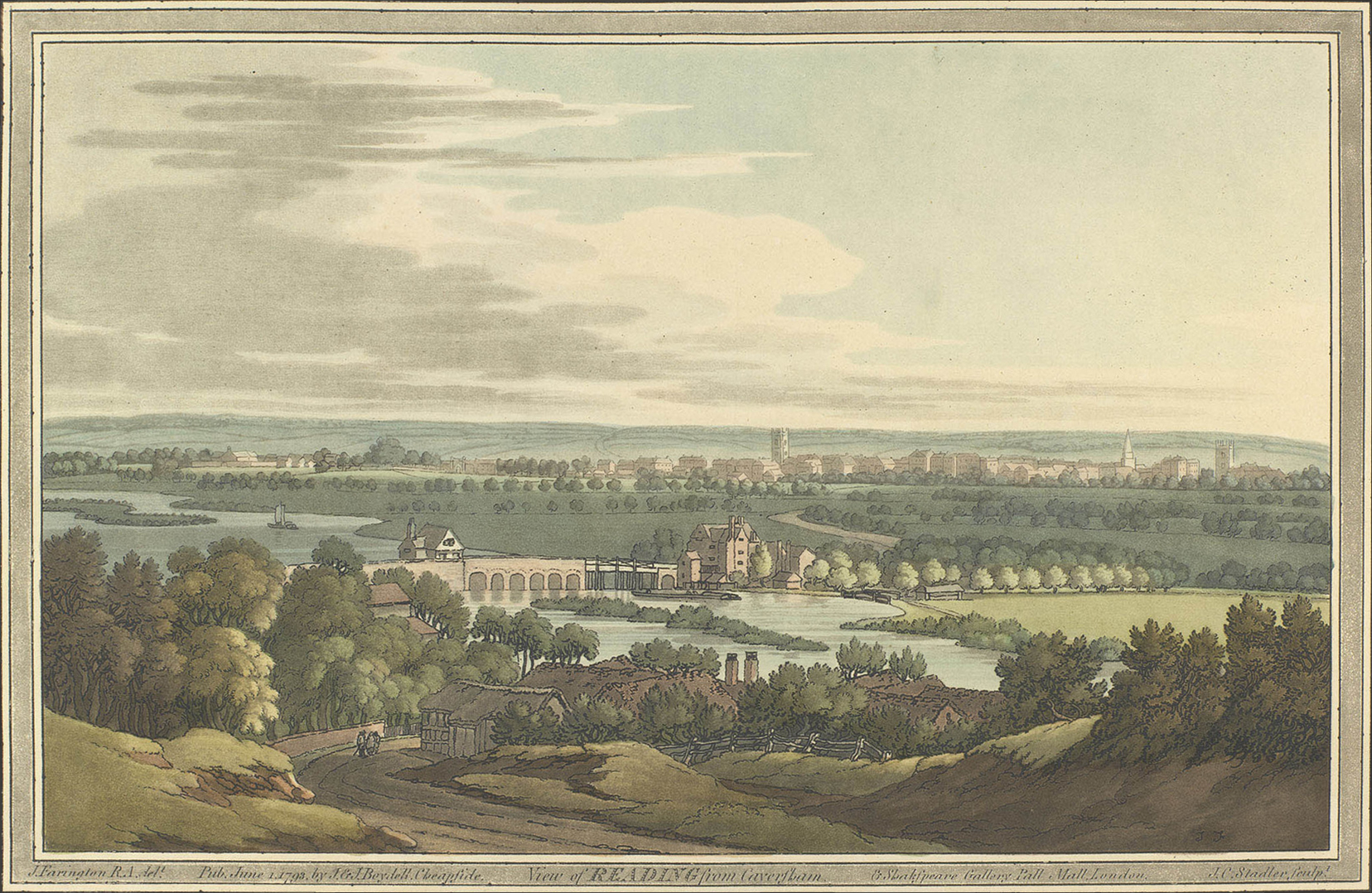
View of Reading from Caversham by Joseph Farington in 1793

Occupation at the site of Reading may date back to the Roman period, possibly in the form of a trading port for Calleva Atrebatum. However, the first clear evidence for Reading as a settlement dates from the 8th century, when the town came to be known as Readingas. The town grew around a crossing of the River Kennet, about 1 mile (1.6 km) upstream from its confluence with the River Thames.

In late 870, an army of Danes invaded the kingdom of Wessex and set up camp at Reading. On 4 January 871, in the first Battle of Reading, King Ethelred and his brother Alfred the Great attempted unsuccessfully to breach the Danes' defences. The battle is described in the Anglo-Saxon Chronicle, and that account provides the earliest known written record of the existence of Reading. The Danes remained in Reading until late in 871, when they retreated to their winter quarters in London.

Following the Norman conquest of England in 1066, William the Conqueror gave land in and around Reading to his foundation of Battle Abbey. In Domesday Book, the town was explicitly described as a borough. The presence of six mills is recorded: four on land belonging to the king and two on the land given to Battle Abbey.

=== Time of the Abbey ===
Reading Abbey was founded in 1121 by Henry I, who is buried within the Abbey grounds. As part of his endowments, he gave the abbey his lands in Reading, along with land at Cholsey. The foundation of Reading Abbey led to the town becoming a place of pilgrimage and enhanced the town's prosperity, however the relationship between abbey and town was to prove strained at times.

In 1253 Reading's Merchant Guild successfully petitioned for the grant of a charter from the King and negotiated a division of authority with the Abbey. In 1312, King Edward II directed that its bridges should be kept in good order.

It is not known how badly Reading was affected by the Black Death that swept through England in the 14th century, but it is known that the abbot, Henry of Appleford, was one of its victims in 1361, and that nearby Henley lost 60% of its population.

=== Dissolution and war ===
The Abbey was largely destroyed in 1538 during Henry VIII's dissolution of the monasteries. The last abbot, Hugh Faringdon, was subsequently tried and convicted of high treason and hanged, drawn and quartered in front of the Abbey Church.

By 1525, Reading was the largest town in Berkshire and the tenth largest town in England when measured by taxable wealth reported in tax returns. By 1611, it had a population of over 5,000 and had grown rich on its trade in cloth, as instanced by the fortune made by local merchant John Kendrick.

Reading played a role during the English Civil War. Despite its fortifications, it had a Royalist garrison imposed on it in 1642. The subsequent Siege of Reading by Parliamentary forces succeeded in April 1643. The town's cloth trade was especially badly damaged, and the town's economy did not fully recover until the 20th century. Reading played a significant role during the Glorious Revolution: the second Battle of Reading was the only substantial military action of the campaign.

=== 18th century ===
The 18th century saw the beginning of a major iron works in the town and the growth of the brewing trade for which Reading was to become famous. Agricultural products from the surrounding area still used Reading as a market place, especially at the famous Reading cheese fair but now trade was coming in from a wider area.

Reading's trade benefited from better designed turnpike roads which helped it establish its location on the major coaching routes from London to Oxford and the West Country. In 1723, despite considerable local opposition, the Kennet Navigation opened the River Kennet to boats as far as Newbury. Opposition stopped when it became apparent that the new route benefited the town. After the opening of the Kennet and Avon Canal in 1810, one could go by barge from Reading to the Bristol Channel.

From 1714, and probably earlier, the role of county town of Berkshire was shared between Reading and Abingdon. In the eighteenth and nineteenth centuries it was one of the southern termini of the Hatfield and Reading Turnpike that allowed travellers from the north to continue their journey to the west without going through the congestion of London.

=== 19th century ===
During the 19th century, the town grew rapidly as a manufacturing centre. It was reformed as a municipal borough by the Municipal Corporations Act 1835 and in 1836 the Reading Borough Police were founded. The Great Western Railway arrived in 1841, followed by the South Eastern Railway in 1849 and the London and South Western Railway in 1856.

After the Summer Assizes (courts of assize) were moved from Abingdon to Reading in 1867, the privy council made Reading the sole county town of Berkshire in 1869. The town became a county borough under the Local Government Act 1888.

In the 19th and 20th centuries, the town's three largest industries were known as the Three Bs: beer (1785–2010, H & G Simonds), bulbs (1837–1974, Suttons Seeds), and biscuits (1822–1976, Huntley and Palmers). Over the century, the town's population had grown from around 9,400 to 59,000.

=== 20th century ===
The town continued to expand in the 20th century, annexing Caversham across the River Thames in Oxfordshire in 1911, as well as most of Tilehurst to the west at the same time. Reading suffered much less physical damage than many other English towns and cities during the two world wars of the 20th century, although many citizens were killed or injured. In one significant air raid on 10 February 1943 a single Luftwaffe plane strafed and bombed the town centre, causing 41 deaths and over 100 injuries.

The Lower Earley development, begun in 1977, was one of the largest private housing developments in Europe, extending the urban area of Reading as far as the M4 Motorway. Further housing developments have increased the number of modern houses and hypermarkets in the outskirts of Reading. A major town-centre shopping centre, The Oracle, opened in 1999, is named after the 17th-century Oracle workhouse, which once occupied a small part of the site.

=== 21st century ===
As one of the largest urban areas in the United Kingdom without city status, Reading has unsuccessfully bid for city status four times – in 2000 to celebrate the new millennium; in 2002 to celebrate the Golden Jubilee of Queen Elizabeth II; in 2012 for the Diamond Jubilee; and in 2022 to mark the Platinum Jubilee.

In 2020 and 2021, and like much of the rest of the world, Reading was affected by the Covid-19 pandemic. On the evening of 20 June 2020, during the first lockdown, Reading's Forbury Gardens were the scene of a terrorist attack in which three people socialising out of doors were killed.

== Governance ==
=== Current governance ===
Local government for the borough is provided by Reading Borough Council, which has been a unitary authority providing all local government functions since 1998. There are no civil parishes in the borough. Some of the built-up area's outer suburbs are outside the borough boundaries in West Berkshire and Wokingham. These outer suburbs belong to civil parishes, in some cases with their own town status.

Reading's boundaries south of the Thames have not changed since 1911, despite the urban area having now expanded well beyond the borough boundaries. Cross-boundary working between the borough council and the neighbouring councils which cover the suburban and adjoining rural areas is sometimes criticised, particularly over matters such as transport and school catchment areas.

Reading has elected at least one Member of Parliament to every Parliament since 1295. Since the 2024 general election, the borough of Reading has been divided between the parliamentary constituencies of Reading Central, Reading West and Mid Berkshire (which also covers part of West Berkshire), and Earley and Woodley (which also covers part of the borough of Wokingham).

Reading is the site of venues for both the Crown Court, administering criminal justice, and the County Court, responsible for civil cases. Lesser matters are dealt with in a local magistrates' court.

=== Administrative history ===
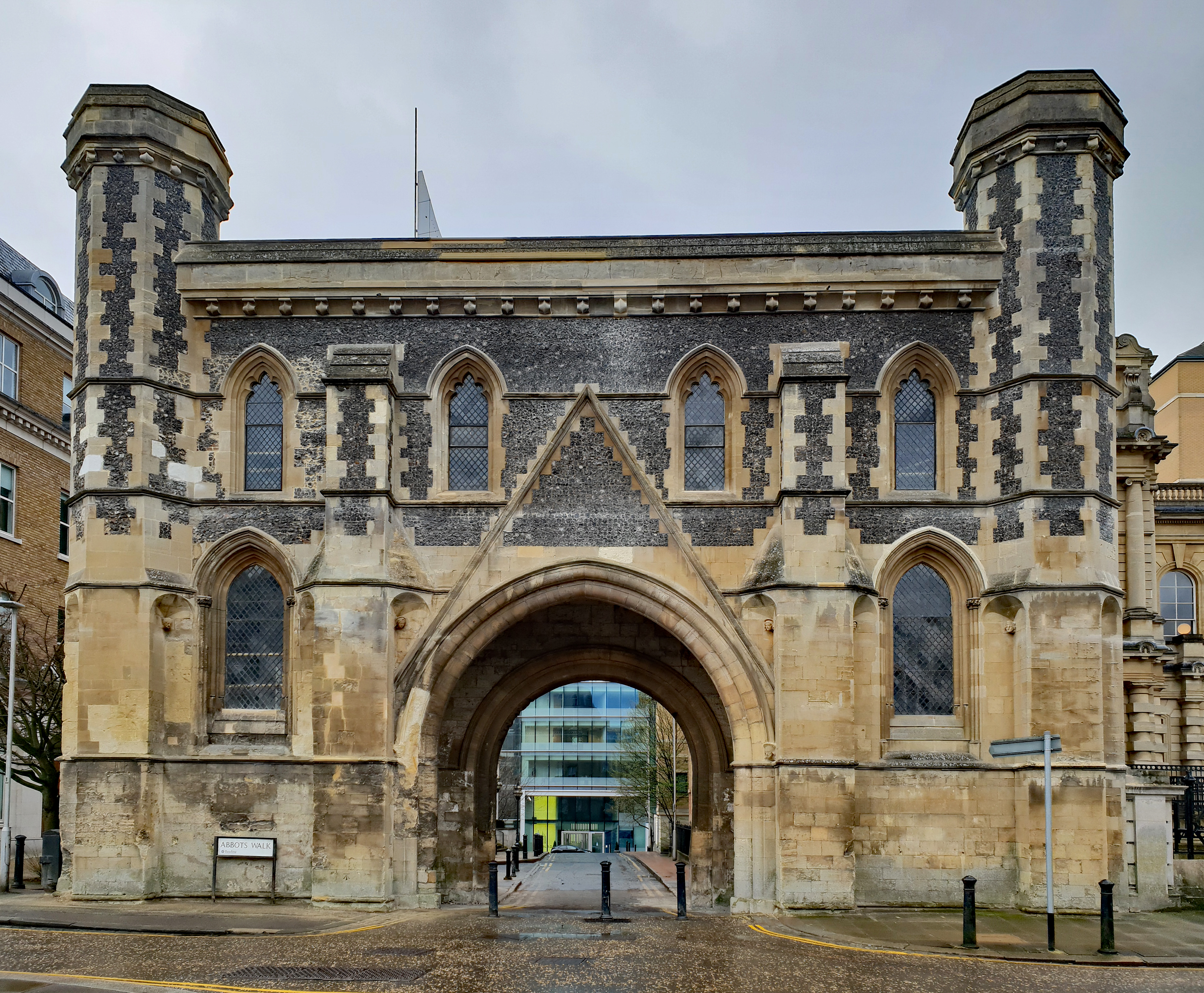
The Abbey Gateway

Reading was an ancient borough, being described as a borough by the time of the Domesday Book in 1086. The borough was initially controlled by Reading Abbey as its manorial owner. The town gradually gained a degree of independence from the abbey from the 13th century onwards, particularly after the town's gild merchants were granted a royal charter in 1253. Following the dissolution of the abbey in 1538 the borough was granted a new charter in 1542. The borough boundaries were then set out in a subsequent charter from Elizabeth I in 1560. The borough covered the whole of the parish of St Laurence and parts of the parishes of St Giles and St Mary. The part of St Giles' parish outside the borough was known as the hamlet of Whitley, and the part of St Mary's parish outside the borough was known as the tithing of Southcote.

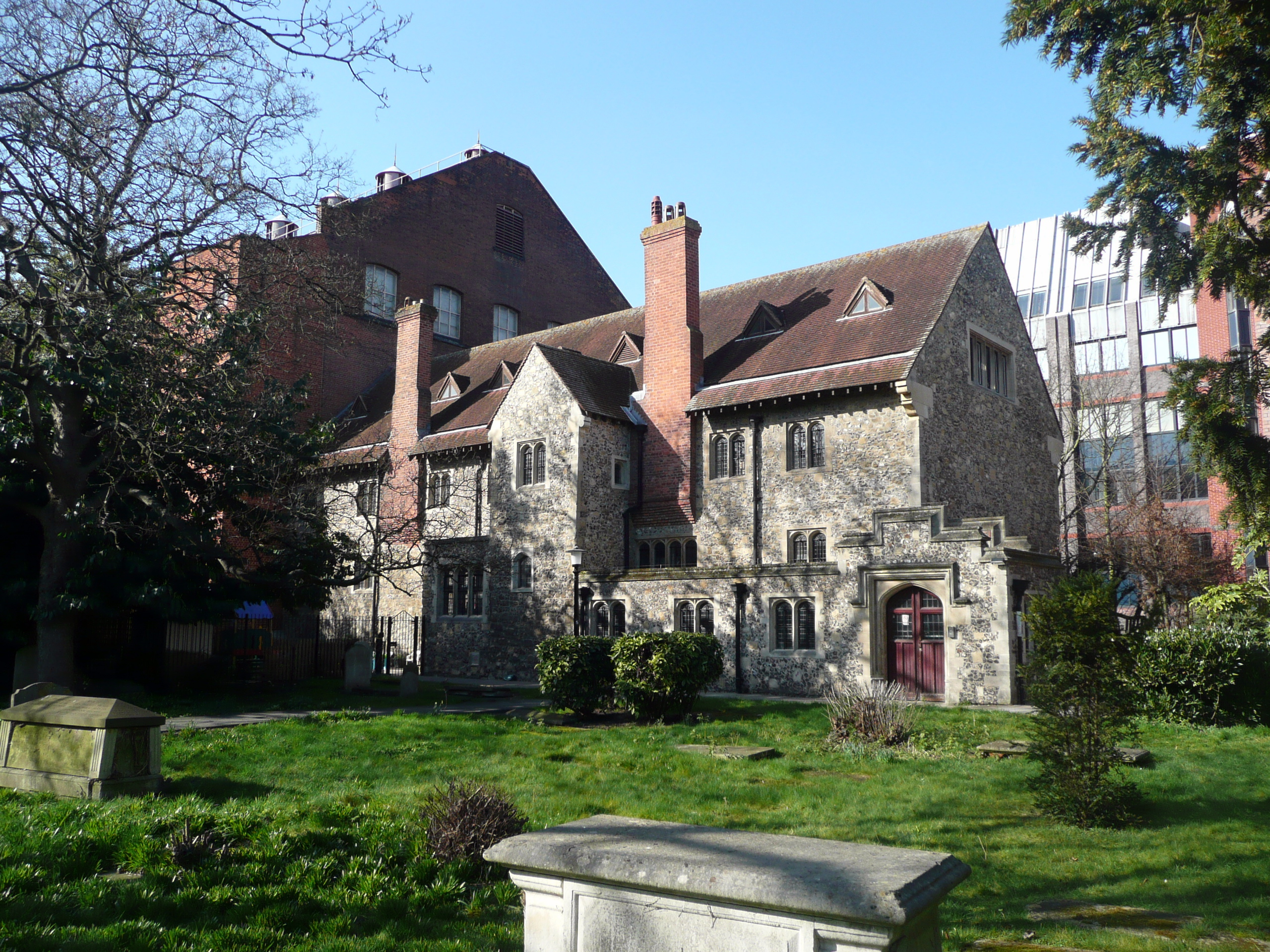
The former hospitium

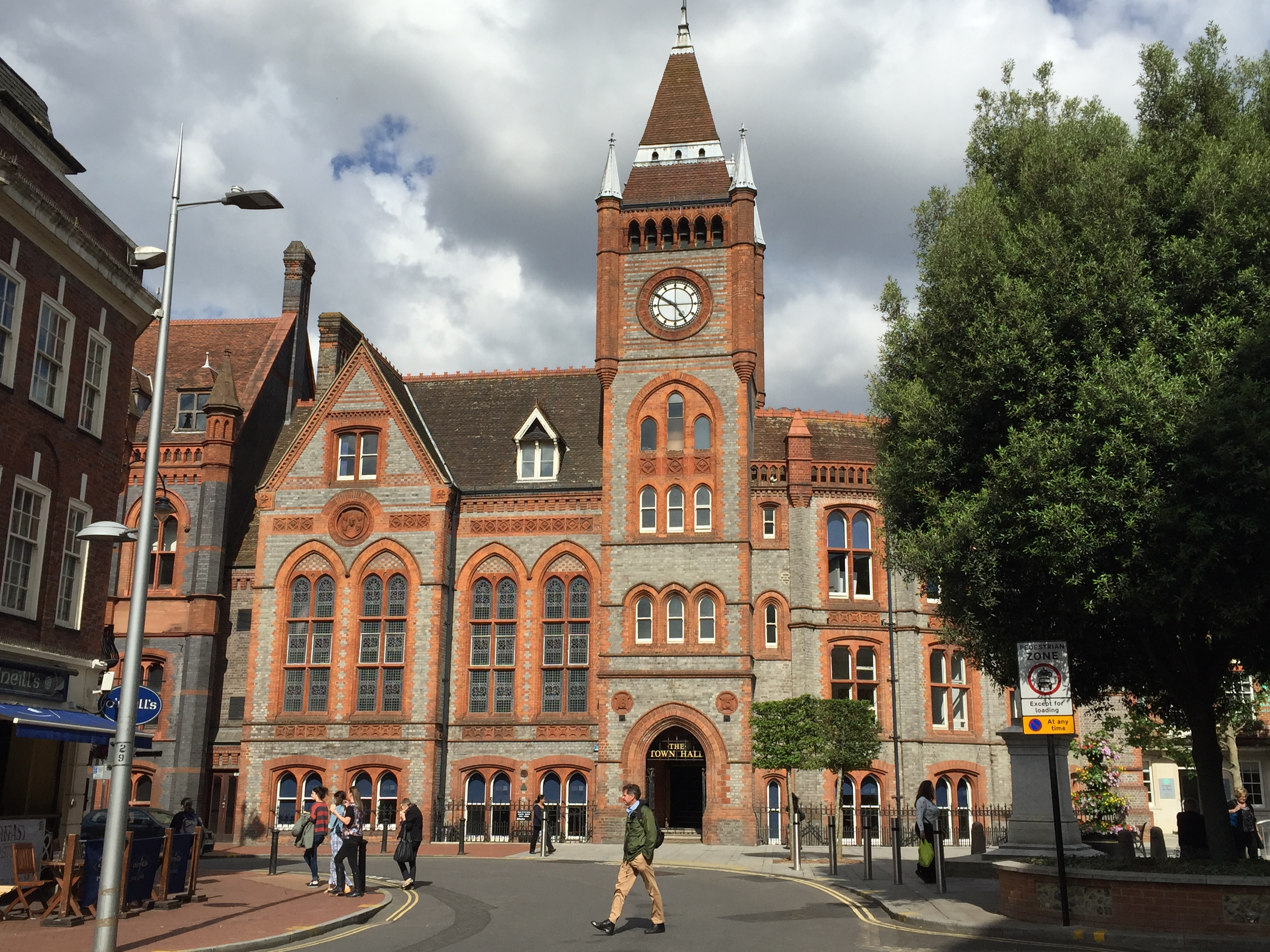
Reading Town Hall

Prior to the 16th century, civic administration for the town of Reading was situated in the Yield Hall, a guild hall situated by the River Kennet near today's Yield Hall Lane. After a brief stay in what later became Greyfriars Church, the town council created a new town hall by inserting an upper floor into the refectory of the Hospitium of St John, the former hospitium of Reading Abbey. For some 400 years up to the 1970s, this was to remain the site of Reading's civic administration through the successive rebuilds that eventually created today's Town Hall. In 1976, Reading Borough Council moved to the new Civic Centre. In 2014, they moved again to civic offices in a refurbished existing office building on Bridge Street, in order to facilitate the demolition and redevelopment of the previous site.

The borough was reformed in 1836 to become a municipal borough under the Municipal Corporations Act 1835, which standardised how most boroughs operated across the country. The borough boundaries, which had not been changed since 1560, were enlarged in 1887 to take in Southcote, Whitley, the north-western parts of Earley, and the eastern end of the parish of Tilehurst. When elected county councils were established in 1889 under the Local Government Act 1888, Reading was considered large enough for its existing borough council to provide county-level services, and so Reading was made a county borough, independent from Berkshire County Council.

The borough boundaries were enlarged again in 1911 to take in Caversham on the north bank of the Thames from Oxfordshire (except the Caversham Park area, which was transferred to the parish of Eye and Dunsden), and most of the parish of Tilehurst (including the main village at Tilehurst Triangle and the area around the parish church at Churchend) to the west.

Local government was reformed in 1974 under the Local Government Act 1972, which saw Reading redesignated as a non-metropolitan district, with Berkshire County Council providing county-level services in the borough for the first time. Ahead of those reforms, the borough council campaigned to have Reading's boundaries enlarged to take in Earley, Woodley, Purley on Thames, the residual Tilehurst parish (covering the parts of Tilehurst which had not been transferred into the borough in 1911), and the eastern part of the parish of Theale. The government decided to make no change to Reading's boundaries, leaving them as they had been since last reviewed in 1911. Shortly after the 1974 reforms came into effect, a more limited review of the borough's boundaries north of the Thames was carried out, which saw the Caversham Park area and part of the parish of Mapledurham on the western side of Caversham transferred into the borough of Reading in 1977.

The borough council became a unitary authority in 1998, when the county council was abolished under the Banham Review, which saw the borough council take over county-level functions, effectively restoring the council to the powers it had held when Reading was a county borough prior to 1974. As part of those reforms, the Local Government Commission had initially recommended expanding Reading's boundaries to include Earley, Tilehurst parish, Purley on Thames and the parts of the parishes of Shinfield, Burghfield and Theale north of the M4 motorway, but it was ultimately decided to leave Reading's boundaries unchanged.

== Geography ==
Location of suburbs of Reading

Reading is 42 miles (68 km) north of the English south coast, 40 miles west of London and 40 miles east of Swindon. The centre of Reading is on a low ridge between the River Thames and River Kennet, close to their confluence, reflecting the town's history as a river port. Just above the confluence, the Kennet cuts through a narrow steep-sided gap in the hills forming the southern flank of the Thames flood plain. The Kennet, which naturally divided into multiple shallow streams through the centre of Reading, was embanked as part of the construction of the Kennet and Avon Canal in the 18th century, allowing the development of wharves. The floodplains adjoining Reading's two rivers are subject to occasional flooding.

As Reading has grown, its suburbs have spread: to the west between the two rivers into the foothills of the Berkshire Downs as far as Calcot, Tilehurst and Purley; to the south and south-east on the south side of the River Kennet as far as Whitley Wood and Lower Earley and as far north of the Thames into the Chiltern Hills as far as Caversham Heights, Emmer Green and Caversham Park Village. Outside the central area, the floors of the valleys containing the two rivers remain largely unimproved floodplain. Apart from the M4 curving to the south there is only one road across the Kennet flood plain. All other routes between the three built-up areas are in the central area.

=== Climate ===
Like the rest of the United Kingdom, Reading has a maritime climate, with limited seasonal temperature ranges and generally moderate rainfall throughout the year. The nearest official Met Office weather station is located at the Reading University Atmospheric Observatory on the Whiteknights Campus, which has recorded atmospheric measurements and meteorological observations since 1970. The local absolute maximum temperature of 37.6 °C (99.7 °F) was recorded on 19 July 2022 and the local absolute minimum temperature of −14.5 °C (5.9 °F) was recorded in January 1982.

The following table summarises climate of Readings:

Climate data for Reading University, elevation: 62 m (203 ft), 1991–2020 normals, extremes 1959–present
Month	Jan	Feb	Mar	Apr	May	Jun	Jul	Aug	Sep	Oct	Nov	Dec	Year
Record high °C (°F)	15.5 (59.9)	19.6 (67.3)	22.8 (73.0)	26.9 (80.4)	33.3 (91.9)	34.0 (93.2)	37.6 (99.7)	36.4 (97.5)	30.7 (87.3)	27.8 (82.0)	18.1 (64.6)	15.8 (60.4)	37.6 (99.7)
Mean daily maximum °C (°F)	8.0 (46.4)	8.5 (47.3)	11.2 (52.2)	14.2 (57.6)	17.4 (63.3)	20.4 (68.7)	22.7 (72.9)	22.3 (72.1)	19.3 (66.7)	15.1 (59.2)	11.0 (51.8)	8.4 (47.1)	14.9 (58.8)
Daily mean °C (°F)	5.1 (41.2)	5.4 (41.7)	7.4 (45.3)	9.7 (49.5)	12.7 (54.9)	15.6 (60.1)	17.8 (64.0)	17.5 (63.5)	14.8 (58.6)	11.5 (52.7)	7.8 (46.0)	5.4 (41.7)	10.9 (51.6)
Mean daily minimum °C (°F)	2.1 (35.8)	2.2 (36.0)	3.5 (38.3)	5.1 (41.2)	8.0 (46.4)	10.8 (51.4)	12.9 (55.2)	12.7 (54.9)	10.4 (50.7)	7.9 (46.2)	4.7 (40.5)	2.5 (36.5)	6.9 (44.4)
Record low °C (°F)	−14.5 (5.9)	−11.6 (11.1)	−7.2 (19.0)	−3.5 (25.7)	−2.0 (28.4)	1.5 (34.7)	4.9 (40.8)	3.4 (38.1)	0.6 (33.1)	−4.4 (24.1)	−8.3 (17.1)	−13.4 (7.9)	−14.5 (5.9)
Average precipitation mm (inches)	65.2 (2.57)	45.6 (1.80)	40.3 (1.59)	48.7 (1.92)	43.5 (1.71)	47.2 (1.86)	48.9 (1.93)	56.9 (2.24)	49.7 (1.96)	73.8 (2.91)	73.1 (2.88)	65.4 (2.57)	658.2 (25.91)
Average precipitation days (≥ 1.0 mm)	11.8	9.7	8.6	9.3	8.1	7.7	8.1	8.5	8.2	10.6	11.8	11.5	113.9
Mean monthly sunshine hours	55.6	76.5	119.7	170.2	199.9	199.0	205.5	190.5	145.3	106.6	60.2	48.5	1,577.5
Average ultraviolet index	2	2	3	3	4	4	5	4	4	3	2	2	3
Source 1: Met Office WeatherAtlas
Source 2: Starlings Roost

=== Environment ===
As of 2022, the Borough of Reading had a tree canopy cover of 17.7%, somewhat higher than the 16.5% recorded for the United Kingdom as a whole. The level of coverage varies significantly by area, with Abbey ward recording only 5.5% and Caversham Heights ward recording 26.9%.

Natural England divides Reading between its Chilterns (110) and Thames Valley (115) national character areas. A third area, Thames Basin Heaths (129), adjoins Reading to its south.

== Demography ==
=== Population ===
Borough of Reading population growth rate from 1801 to 2011

Population pyramid of Reading in 2021

In mid-2018, the area covered by the Borough of Reading had 183,762 inhabitants and a population density of 4,549 per square kilometre (11,782/sq mi). Meanwhile, the wider urban area had a population of 318,014 in the 2011 census, ranking 23rd in the United Kingdom. This grew to an estimated 337,108 by mid-2018.

=== Ethnicity ===
According to the 2011 census, 74.8% of the borough's population were described as White (65.3% White British), 9.1% as South Asian, 6.7% as Black, 3.9% Mixed, 4.5% as Chinese and 0.9% as other ethnic group. In 2010, it was reported that Reading had 150 different spoken languages within its population. Reading has a large Polish community, which dates back over 30 years, and in October 2006 the Reading Chronicle printed 5,000 copies of a Polish edition called the Kronika Reading.

The following table summarises the ethnic composition of Reading over the years:

Ethnic Group	Year											
Ethnic Group	1971 estimations		1981 estimations		1991		2001		2011		2021	
Ethnic Group	Number	%	Number	%	Number	%	Number	%	Number	%	Number	%
White: Total	123,700	94.9%	119,084	92.3%	116,652	90.5%	124,240	86.8%	116,387	74.7%	116,886	67.2%
White: British	–	–	–	–	–	–	115,363	80.6%	101,725	65.3%	93,167	53.5%
White: Irish	–	–	–	–	–	–	2,866	2%	2,269	1.5%	2,040	1.2%
White: Gypsy or Irish Traveller	–	–	–	–	–	–	–	–	90	–	107	0.1%
White: Roma	–	–	–	–	–	–	–	–	–	–	573	0.3%
White: Other	–	–	–	–	–	–	6,011	4.2%	12,303	7.9%	20,999	12.1%
Asian or Asian British: Total	–	–	–	–	5,920	4.6%	8,478	5.9%	21,161	13.6%	30,841	17.7%
Asian or Asian British: Indian	–	–	–	–	1,748	1.4%	2,425	1.7%	6,514	4.2%	10,777	6.2%
Asian or Asian British: Pakistani	–	–	–	–	2,771	2.2%	3,828	2.7%	6,967	4.5%	8,279	4.8%
Asian or Asian British: Bangladeshi	–	–	–	–	214	0.2%	359	0.3%	695	0.4%	1,132	0.6%
Asian or Asian British: Chinese	–	–	–	–	497	0.4%	1,030	0.7%	1,603	1.0%	2,694	1.5%
Asian or Asian British: Other Asian	–	–	–	–	690	0.5%	836	0.6%	5,382	3.5%	7,959	4.6%
Black or Black British: Total	–	–	–	–	5,196	4%	5,931	4.1%	10,470	6.7%	12,532	7.2%
Black or Black British: African	–	–	–	–	764	0.6%	2,222	1.6%	6,087	3.9%	7,665	4.4%
Black or Black British: Caribbean	–	–	–	–	3416	2.7%	3,181	2.2%	3,279	2.1%	3,293	1.9%
Black or Black British: Other Black	–	–	–	–	1016	0.8%	528	0.4%	1,104	0.7%	1,574	0.9%
Mixed or British Mixed: Total	–	–	–	–	–	–	3,399	2.4%	6,180	4%	8,962	5.1%
Mixed: White and Black Caribbean	–	–	–	–	–	–	1,677	1.2%	2,718	1.7%	3,555	2.0%
Mixed: White and Black African	–	–	–	–	–	–	317	0.2%	802	0.5%	1,249	0.7%
Mixed: White and Asian	–	–	–	–	–	–	734	0.5%	1,428	0.9%	2,117	1.2%
Mixed: Other Mixed	–	–	–	–	–	–	671	0.5%	1,232	0.8%	2,041	1.2%
Other: Total	–	–	–	–	1,109	0.9%	1,048	0.7%	1,500	1%	5,002	2.8%
Other: Arab	–	–	–	–	–	–	–	–	680	0.4%	1,282	0.7%
Other: Any other ethnic group	–	–	–	–	1,109	0.9%	1,048	0.7%	820	0.6%	3,720	2.1%
Ethnic minority: Total	6,586	5.1%	9,980	7.7%	12,225	9.5%	18,856	13.2%	39,311	25.3%	57,337	32.8%
Total	130,286	100%	129,064	100%	128,877	100%	143,096	100%	155,698	100%	174,223	100%

=== Religion ===
The following table summarises the religious composition of Reading over the years:

Religion	2001		2011		2021	
Religion	Number	%	Number	%	Number	%
Christian	89,618	62.6	77,848	50.0	68,987	39.6
Buddhist	688	0.5	1,876	1.2	2,887	1.7
Hindu	1,417	1.0	5,661	3.6	8,757	5.0
Jewish	415	0.3	355	0.2	329	0.2
Muslim	5,730	4.0	11,007	7.1	15,481	8.9
Sikh	781	0.5	947	0.6	1,194	0.7
Other religion	518	0.4	701	0.5	1,241	0.7
No religion	31,486	22.0	45,931	29.5	63,287	36.3
Religion not stated	12,443	8.7	11,372	7.3	12,062	6.9
Total population	143,096	100.0	155,698	100.0	174,226	100.00

== Economy ==
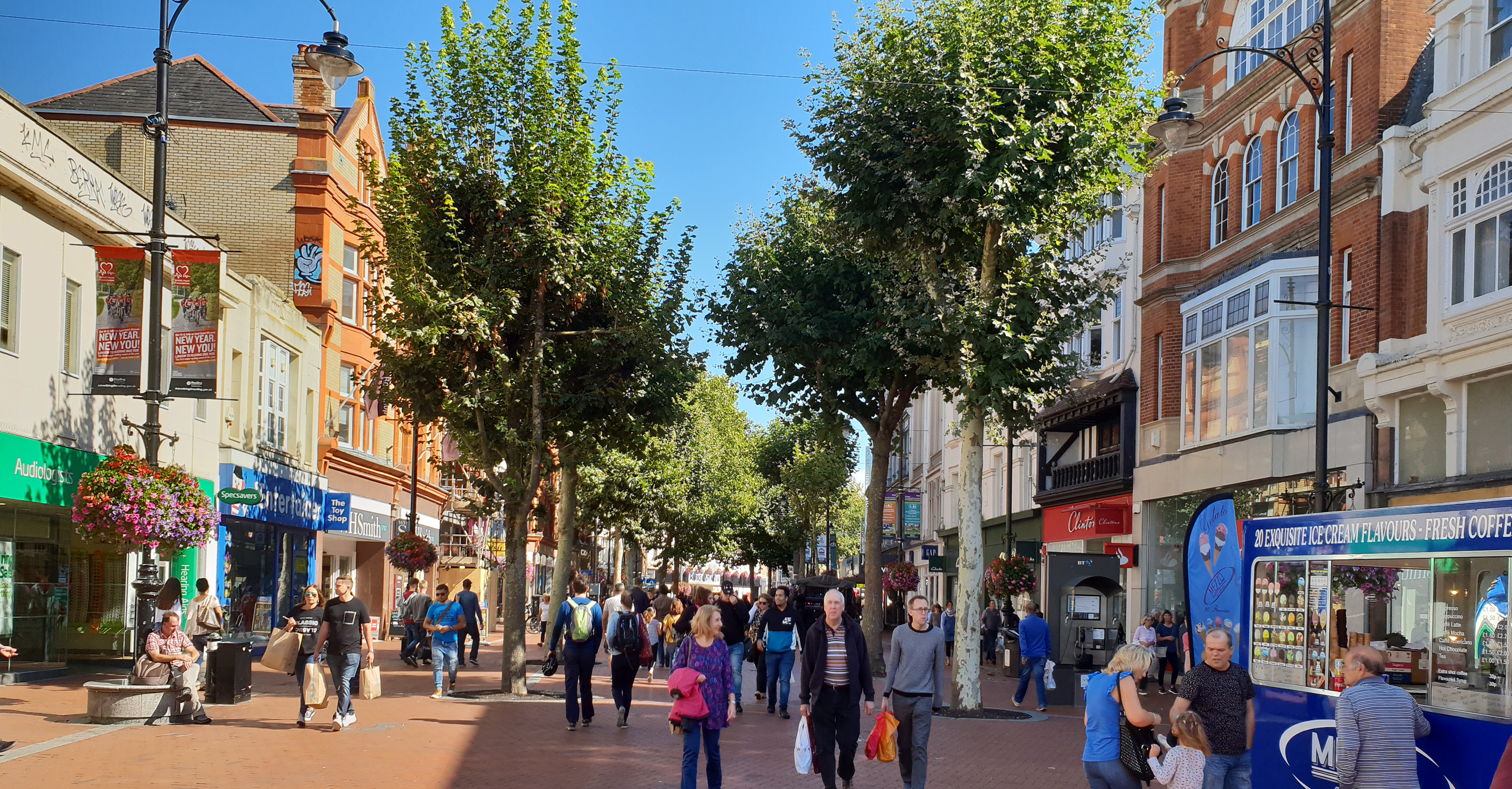
Broad Street

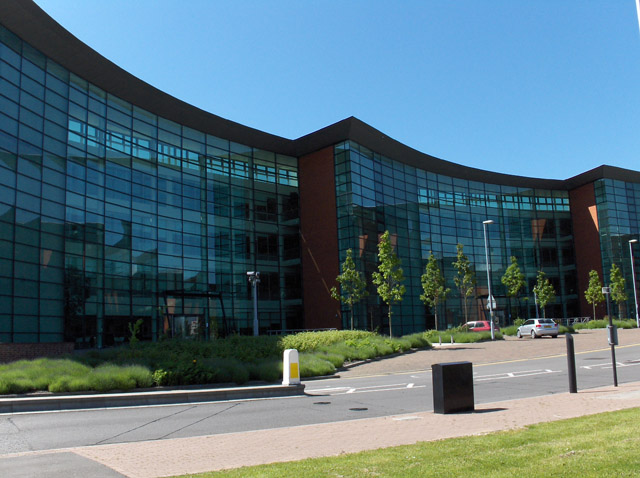
Reading International Business Park. This crescent of offices beside the A33 is home to Verizon, a telecommunications company, and was formerly the European headquarters of WorldCom before its demise

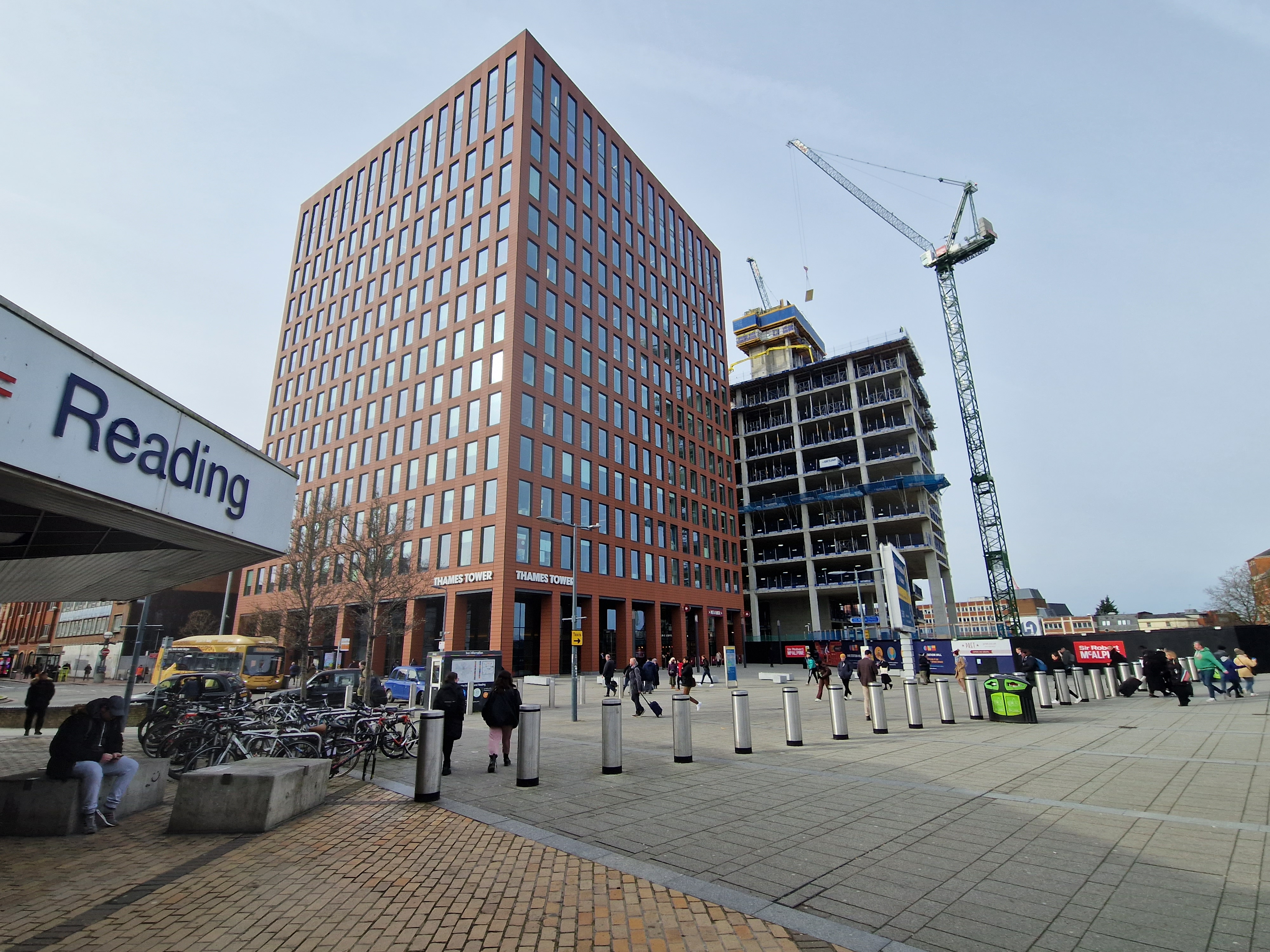
The area around Reading Station undergoing regeneration to construct new office buildings in 2023

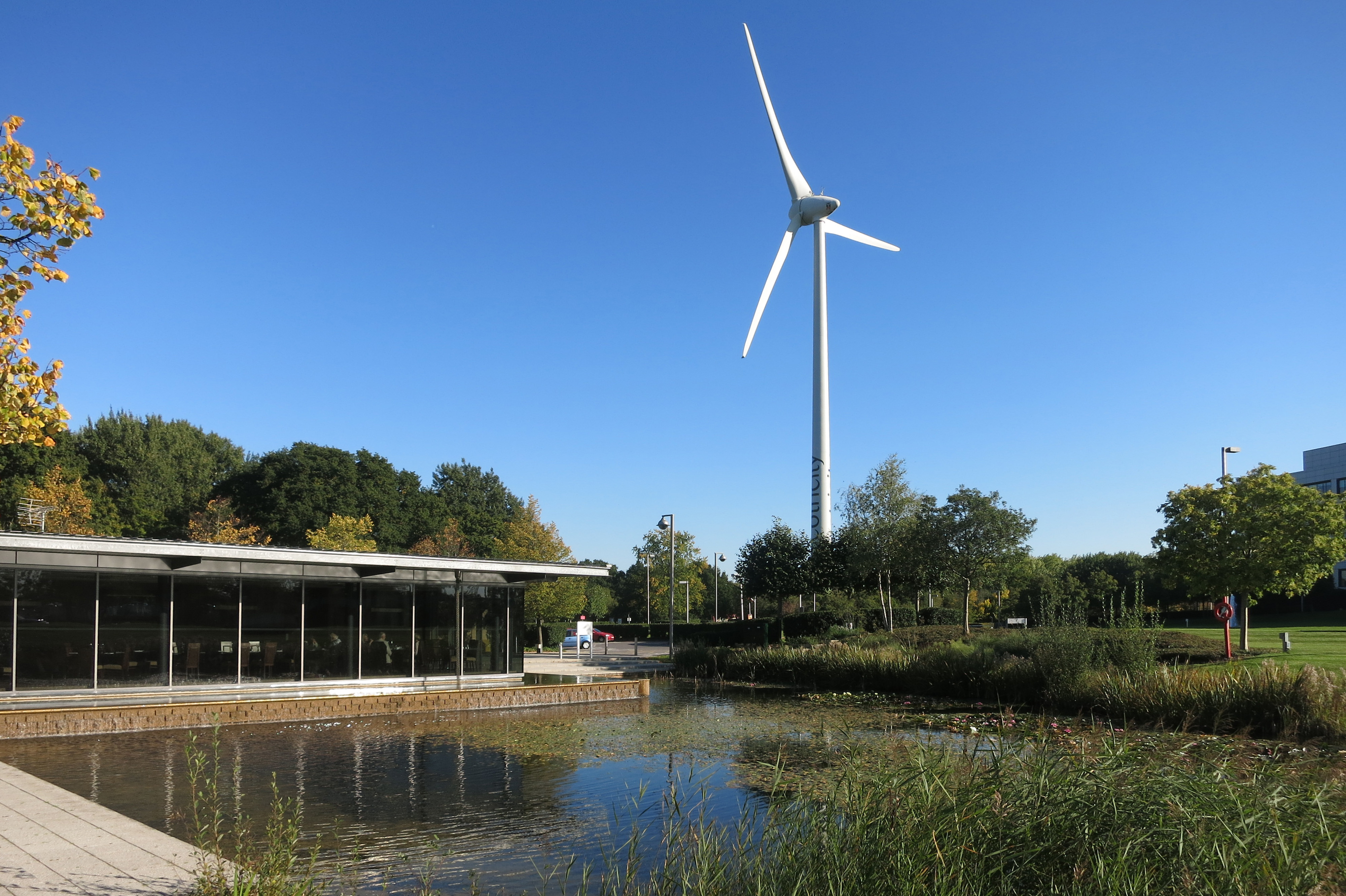
Green Park wind turbine viewed from Lime Square

Reading is a commercial centre in the Thames Valley and Southern England. The town hosts the headquarters of several British companies and the United Kingdom offices of foreign multinationals, as well as being a major retail centre. Whilst located close enough to London to be sometimes regarded as part of the London commuter belt, Reading is a net inward destination for commuters. During the morning peak period, there are some 30,000 inward arrivals in the town, compared to 24,000 departures. Major companies Microsoft, Oracle and Hibu (formerly Yell Group) have their headquarters in the Reading area. The insurance company Prudential has an administration centre in the town. PepsiCo and Wrigley also have offices in the town.

Global pharmaceutical giant Bayer Life Sciences relocated to Reading's Green Park Business Park in 2016. Reading has a significant historical involvement in the information technology industry, largely as a result of the early presence in the town of sites of International Computers Limited and Digital Equipment Corporation. Other technology companies with a significant presence in the town include Huawei Technologies, Pegasystems, Access IS, CGI Inc., Agilent Technologies, Cisco, Ericsson, Symantec, Verizon Business, and Commvault. These companies are distributed around Reading or just outside the borough boundary, some in business parks including Thames Valley Park in nearby Earley, Green Park Business Park and Arlington Business Park.

Reading town centre is a major shopping centre. In 2007, an independent poll placed Reading 16th in a league table of best performing retail centres in the United Kingdom. The main shopping street is Broad Street, which runs between The Oracle in the east and Broad Street Mall in the west and was pedestrianised in 1995. The smaller Friars Walk in Friar Street is closed and will be demolished if the proposed Station Hill redevelopment project goes ahead. There are three major department stores in Reading: John Lewis & Partners (known as Heelas until 2001), Debenhams (now closed down), and House of Fraser (also now closed down). The Broad Street branch of bookseller Waterstone's is a conversion of a nonconformist chapel dating from 1707. Besides the two major shopping malls, Reading has three smaller shopping arcades, the Bristol and West Arcade, Harris Arcade and The Walk, which contain smaller specialist stores. An older form of retail facility is represented by Union Street, popularly known as Smelly Alley. Reading has no indoor market, but there is a street market in Hosier Street. A farmers' market operates on two Saturdays a month. The old Victorian Corn Exchange now provides an alternative access to a shopping centre.

== Culture ==
=== Festivals ===
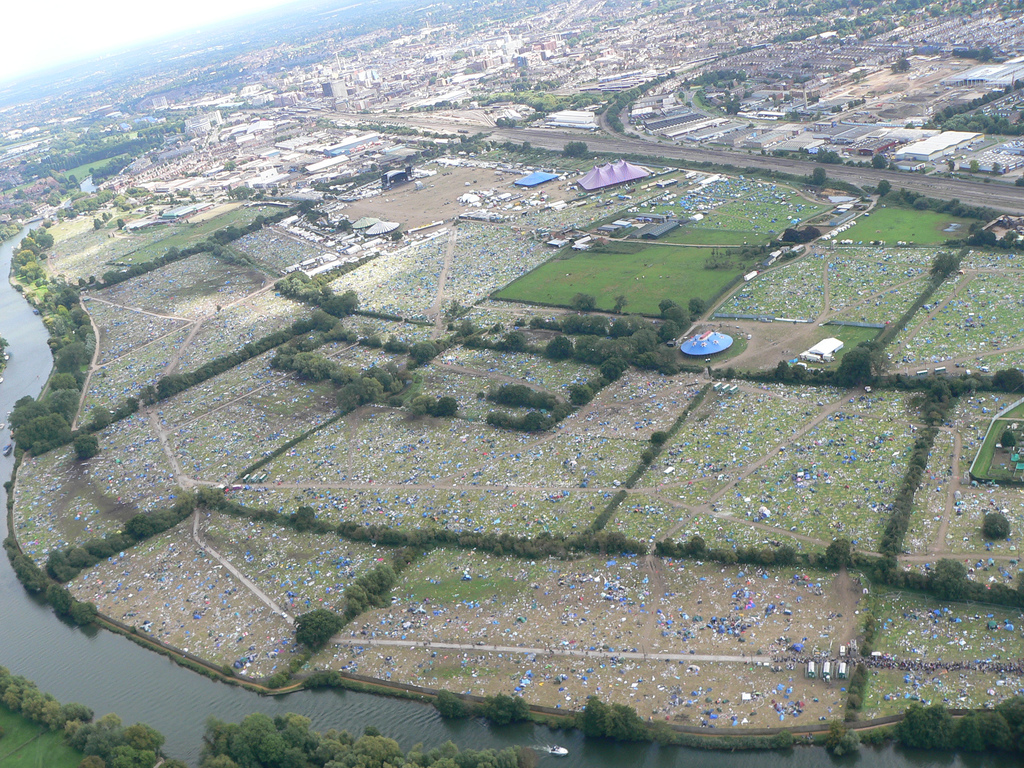
Aerial view of Reading Festival 2007

Every year Reading hosts the Reading Festival, which has been running since 1971. The festival takes place on the Friday, Saturday and Sunday of the August bank holiday weekend and is the largest of its kind in the United Kingdom aside from the Glastonbury Festival. Reading Festival takes place at Little Johns Farm in Reading, Richfield Avenue. For some twenty years until 2006, Reading was also known for its WOMAD Festival until it moved to Charlton Park in Malmesbury, Wiltshire.

The Reading Beer Festival was first held in 1994 and has now grown to one of the largest beer festivals in the United Kingdom. It is held at King's Meadow for the five days immediately preceding the May Day bank holiday every year. Reading also holds Reading Pride, an annual LGBT festival in Kings Meadow.

=== Venues ===
The Frank Matcham-designed Royal County Theatre, built in 1895, was located on the south side of Friar Street. It burned down in 1937. Within the town hall is a 700-seat concert hall that houses a Father Willis organ. Reading theatre venues include The Hexagon and South Street Arts Centre. Reading Repertory Theatre is based at Reading College: its Royal Patron is Prince Edward, Duke of Edinburgh. Amateur theatre venues in Reading include Progress Theatre, a self-governing, self-funding theatre group and registered charity founded in 1947 that operates and maintains its own 97-seat theatre. Rabble Theatre in Caversham and Reading Rep on London Road offer classic and contemporary performances. Jelly is an artist-led organisation that has been committed to improving access to the arts since 1993.

=== Cultural references ===
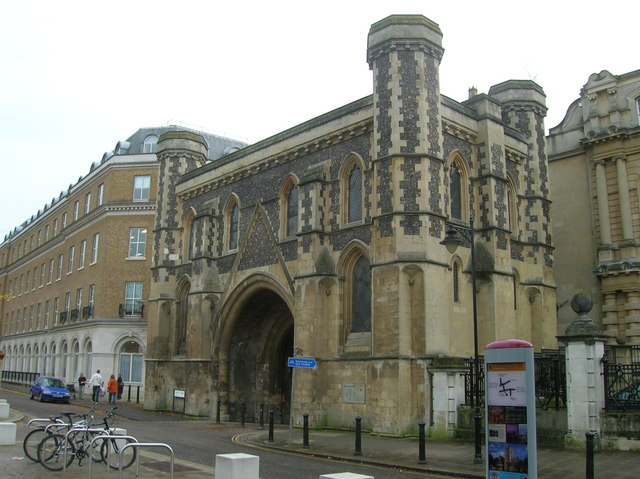
The Abbey Gateway, where Jane Austen went to school

Jane Austen attended Reading Ladies Boarding School, based in the Abbey Gateway, in 1784–1786. Mary Russell Mitford lived in Reading for a number of years and then spent the rest of her life just outside the town at Three Mile Cross and Swallowfield. The fictional Belford Regis of her eponymous novel, first published in 1835, is largely based on Reading. Described with topographical accuracy, it is still possible to follow the steps of the novel's characters in present-day Reading. Reading also appears in the works of Thomas Hardy where it is called 'Aldbrickham'. It features most heavily in his final novel, Jude the Obscure, as the temporary home of Jude Fawley and Sue Bridehead.

Oscar Wilde was imprisoned in Reading Gaol from 1895 to 1897. While there, he wrote his letter De Profundis. After his release, he lived in exile in France and wrote The Ballad of Reading Gaol, based on his experience of the execution of Charles Wooldridge, carried out in Reading Gaol whilst he was imprisoned there. In March 2021, street artist Banksy claimed responsibility for a painting on the wall of the jail. It depicted an inmate escaping with bedsheets and a typewriter, said to resemble Oscar Wilde.

Reading was the location of the world's first commercial studio for photograph printing, which was set up by William Henry Fox Talbot in 1844.

Ricky Gervais, the actor and comedian, grew up in Whitley, a largely working-class council estate in south Reading, and made the film Cemetery Junction, which, although filmed elsewhere in the United Kingdom, is set in 1970s Reading and is named after Cemetery Junction in East Reading. Jasper Fforde's Nursery Crimes Division novels, The Big Over Easy and The Fourth Bear, are also placed in Reading. The BBC Two sitcom Beautiful People, based on the memoirs of Simon Doonan, is set in Reading in the late 1990s.

=== Landmarks ===
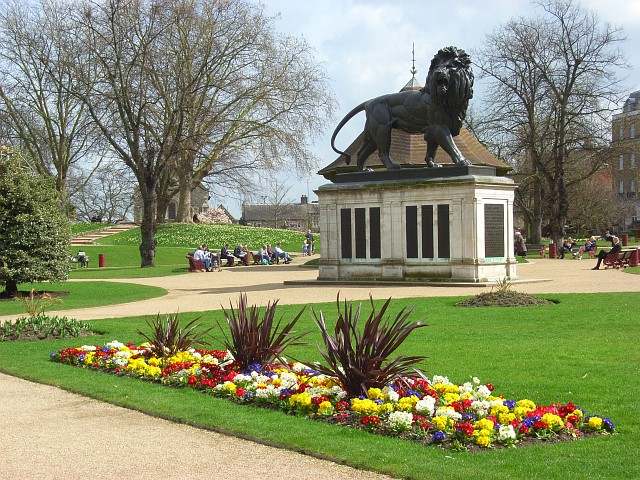
The Maiwand Lion in Forbury Gardens

The Maiwand Lion in Forbury Gardens, an unofficial symbol of Reading, commemorates the 329 officers and men of the Royal Berkshire Regiment who died in the Battle of Maiwand and the rest of the Second Anglo-Afghan War. There are a number of other works of public art in Reading. The Blade, a fourteen-storey building completed in 2009, is 86 m (282 ft) tall and can be seen from the surrounding area. Jacksons Corner with its prominent sign, former home of Jacksons department store, occupies the corner of Kings Road and High Street, just south of the Market Place.

Reading has two scheduled monuments, six Grade I, 22 Grade II* and 853 Grade II listed buildings, in a wide variety of architectural styles that range from the medieval to the 21st century. The scheduled monuments are Reading Abbey and High Bridge, whilst the Grade I listed buildings are Reading Abbey, the Abbey Gateway, Greyfriars Church, St Laurence's Church, Reading Minster, and the barn at Chazey Farmhouse on the Warren.

=== Media ===
Reading has a local newspaper, the Reading Chronicle, published on Thursdays. The town's other local newspaper, the Reading Post, ceased publication on paper in December 2014, in order to transition to an online only format under the title getreading. As of 2018, getreading joined the InYourArea local news network. A local publishing company, the Two Rivers Press, has published over 70 book titles, many on the topic of local history and art. Three local radio stations broadcast from Reading: BBC Radio Berkshire, Heart South and Greatest Hits Radio Berkshire and North Hampshire. Local news and television programmes are provided by BBC South and ITV Meridian; BBC London and ITV London can also be received. Reading has one local television station, That's Thames Valley, which broadcasts local news throughout the Greater Reading area.

== Public services ==
=== Parks and open spaces ===
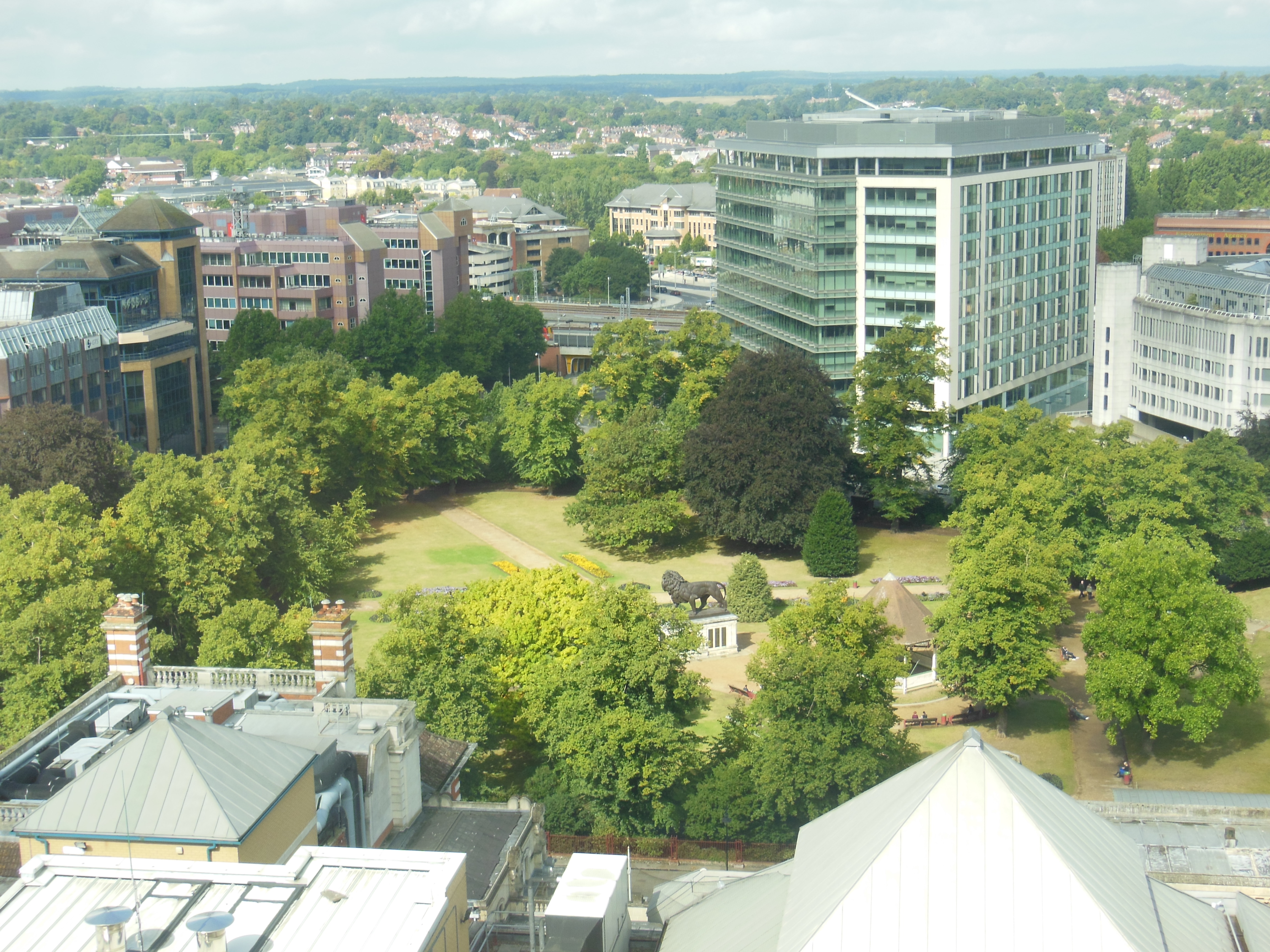
Forbury Gardens seen from The Blade. The parks alongside the Thames are shown by the trees in the middle distance.

Reading has over 100 parks and playgrounds, including 5 miles (8 km) of riverside paths. In the town centre is Forbury Gardens, a public park built on the site of the outer court of Reading Abbey. The largest public park in Reading is Prospect Park, an estate in west Reading previously owned by Frances Kendrick but acquired by Reading Corporation in 1901. This is complemented by Palmer Park, a purpose built public park in east Reading gifted to the town by the proprietors of Huntley & Palmers in 1889.

A string of open spaces stretch along one or other side of the River Thames throughout its passage through Reading. From west to east these are Thameside Promenade, Caversham Court, Christchurch Meadows, Hills Meadow, View Island and King's Meadow. Reading also has five local nature reserves: Clayfield Copse in Caversham, with the other four McIlroy Park, Blundells Copse, Lousehill Copse and Round Copse all in Tilehurst

=== Healthcare ===
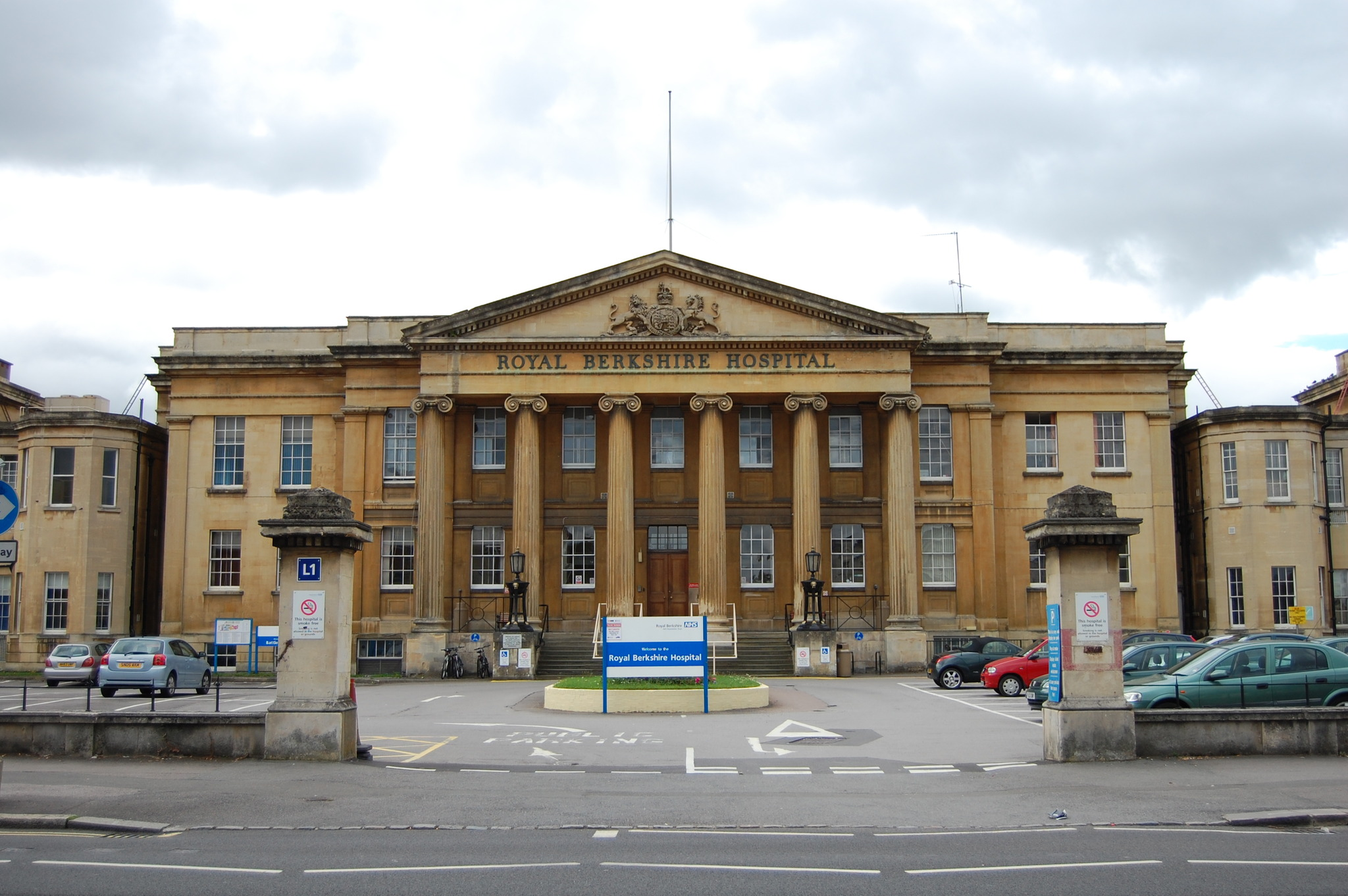
The Royal Berkshire Hospital original frontage, built in 1839 with bath stone

The principal National Health Service (NHS) hospital in Reading is the Royal Berkshire Hospital, founded in 1839 and much enlarged and rebuilt since. A second major NHS general hospital, the Battle Hospital, closed in 2005. Prospect Park Hospital is an NHS hospital which specialises in the provision of care for people with mental health and learning disabilities.

Reading has three private hospitals: the Berkshire Independent Hospital in Coley Park, the Dunedin Hospital situated on the main A4 Bath Road, and the Circle Reading Hospital at Kennet Island.

=== Utilities ===
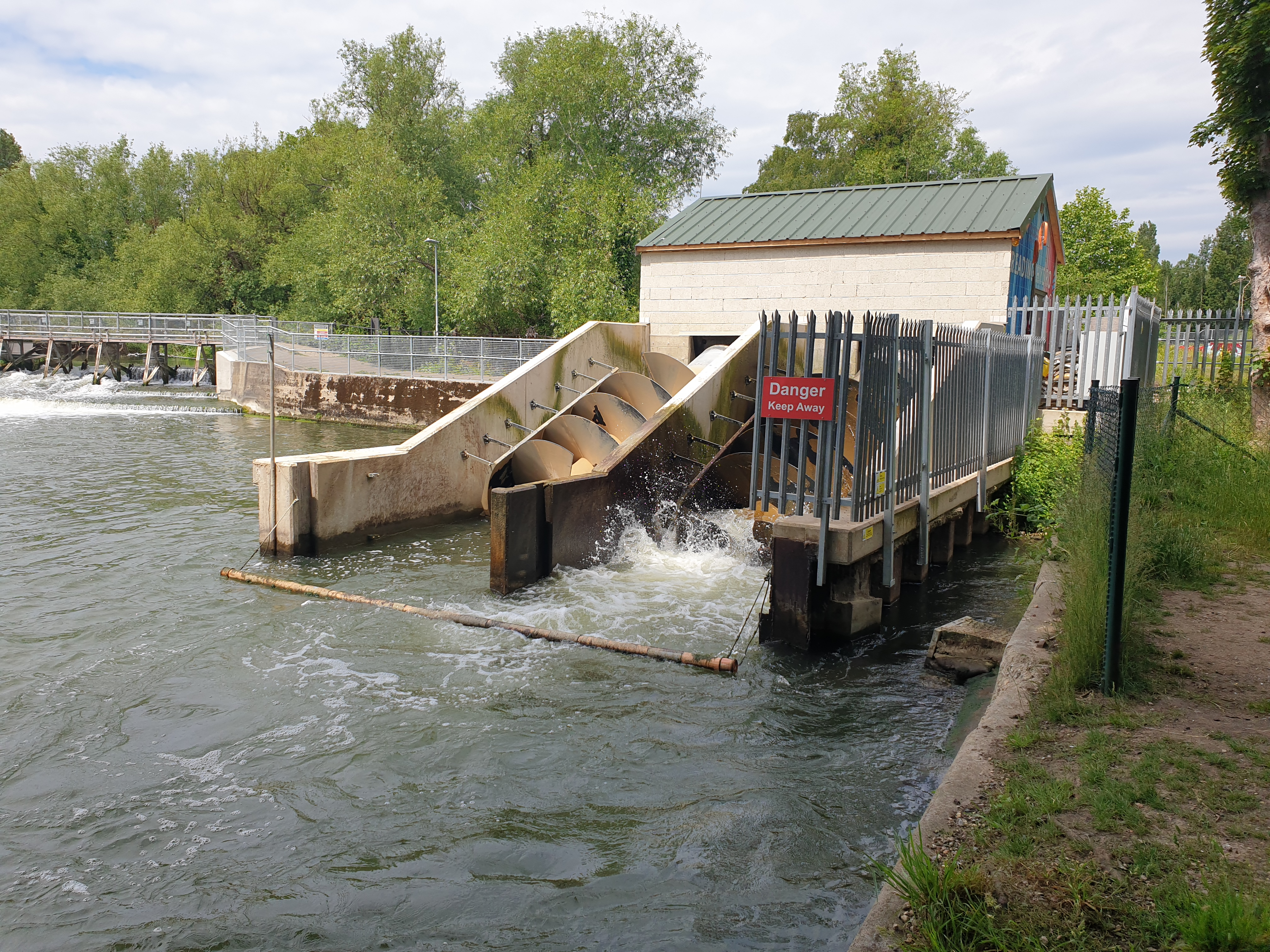
Reading Hydro plant at Caversham Weir on the River Thames

Mains water and sewerage services are provided by Thames Water Utilities Limited, a private sector water supply company, whilst water abstraction and disposal is regulated by the Environment Agency. Reading's water supply is largely derived from underground aquifers, and as a consequence the water is hard.

The commercial energy supplier for electricity and gas is at the consumer's choice. SSEN runs the local electricity distribution network, while SGN runs the gas distribution network. A notable part of the local energy infrastructure is the presence of a 2 megawatt (peak) Enercon wind turbine at Green Park Business Park, with the potential to produce 2.7 million kWh of electricity a year, enough to power over a thousand homes. Additionally, Reading Hydro runs a micro hydroelectric power station on the Thames. Reading had its own power station in Vastern Road from 1895 to the 1960s. The power station was initially owned and operated by the Reading Electric Supply Company Limited, then from 1933 by the Reading Corporation until the nationalisation of the British electricity supply industry in 1948.

The dialling code for fixed-line telephones in Reading is 0118. BT provides fixed-line telephone coverage throughout the town and ADSL broadband internet connection to most areas. Parts of Reading are cabled by Virgin Media, supplying cable television, telephone and broadband internet connections. Hyperoptic also has a presence in the town, supplying Fibre-to-the-Premises (FTTP) broadband internet connections at speeds of up to 1 Gbit/s.

=== Education ===
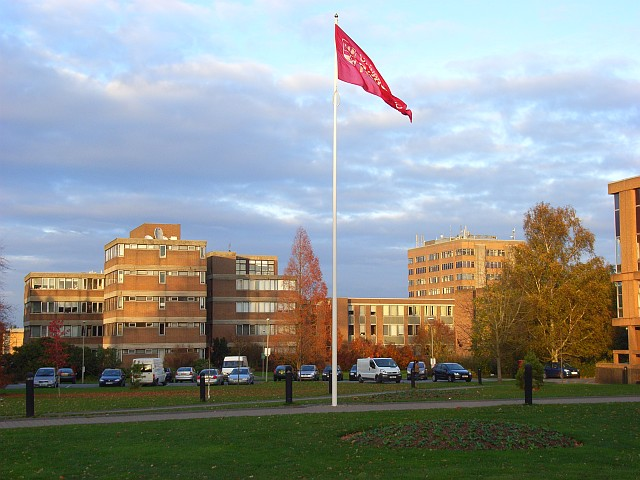
Part of the University of Reading's main Whiteknights Campus

Reading School (a state grammar school), founded in 1125, is the 16th oldest school in England. There are six other state secondary schools and 38 state primary schools within the borough, together with a number of private schools and nurseries. Alfred Sutton Boys' School closed in the mid-1980s. Reading College has provided further education in Reading since 1955, with over 8,500 local learners on over 900 courses. English language schools in Reading include Gateway Languages, the English Language Centre, ELC London Street and Eurospeak Language School.

The University of Reading was established in 1892 as an affiliate of Oxford University. It moved to its London Road Campus in 1904 and to its new Whiteknights Campus in 1947. It took over the Bulmershe College of Higher Education, a teacher training college, in 1989, becoming Bulmershe Court Campus. The Henley Management College, situated in Buckinghamshire and about 10 miles (16 km) from Reading, was taken over in 2008, becoming Greenlands Campus. The University of West London maintains a presence in the town for its higher education students, principally in nursing, but has now divested itself of its previous ownership of Reading College and its further education students.

=== Libraries and museums ===
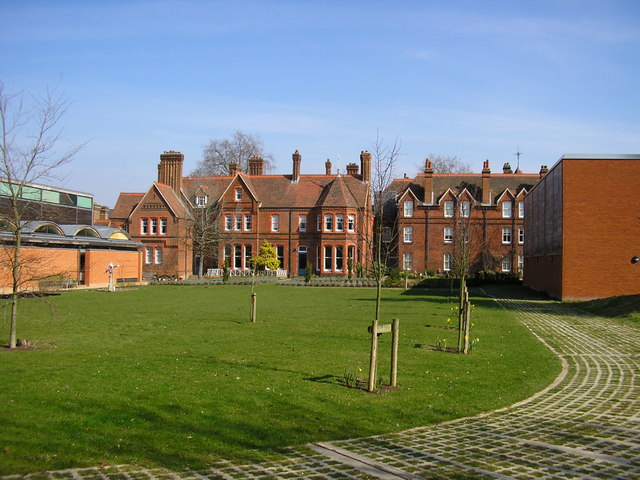
The Museum of English Rural Life's rear garden, with the original East Thorpe House in the centre

The Reading Borough Libraries service dates back to 1877. Initially housed in Reading Town Hall, the central branch of the library was relocated to a new building on King's Road in 1985, and again to part of the Borough Council complex on Bridge Street in 2026.

The Reading Museum opened in 1883 in the town's municipal buildings. It contains galleries relating to the history of Reading and to the excavations of Calleva Atrebatum, together with a full-size bowdlerised replica of the Bayeux Tapestry, an art collection, and galleries relating to Huntley and Palmers. The Museum of English Rural Life, in East Reading, is a museum dedicated to recording the changing face of farming and the countryside in England. It houses designated collections of national importance. It is owned and run by the University of Reading, as are the Ure Museum of Greek Archaeology, the Cole Museum of Zoology and the Harris Botanic Gardens, all of which can be found on the university's Whiteknights Campus. The small Riverside Museum at Blake's Lock tells the story of Reading's two rivers. The Museum of Berkshire Aviation has a collection of aircraft and other artefacts relating to the aircraft industry in the town.

== Transport ==
Reading's location in the Thames Valley to the west of London has made the town a significant element in the nation's transport system.

=== River ===
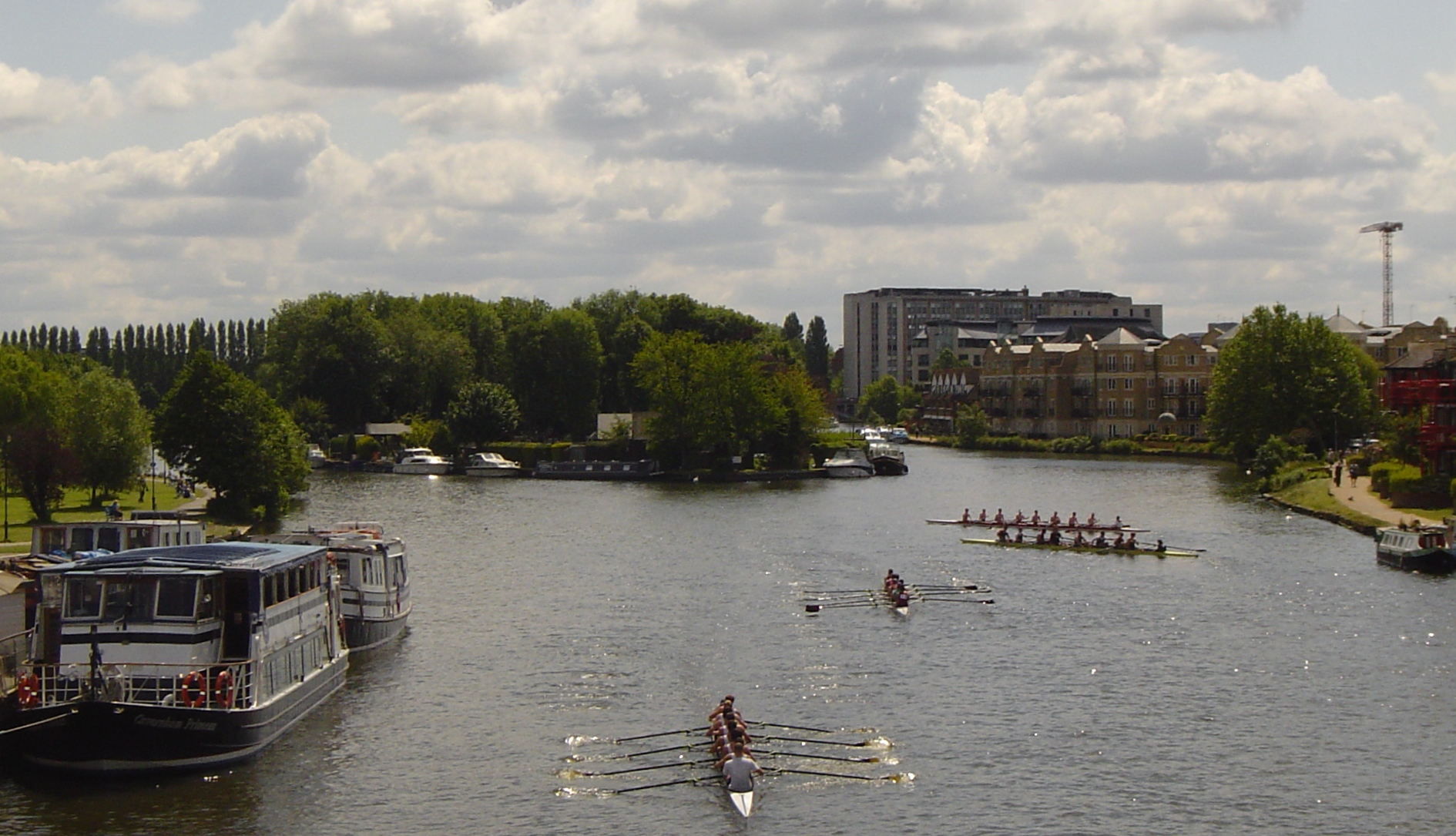
The Thames in Reading

The town grew up as a river port at the confluence of the River Thames and the River Kennet. Both of these rivers are navigable, and Caversham Lock, Blake's Lock, County Lock, Fobney Lock and Southcote Lock are all within the borough.

Today, navigation is predominantly for purposes of leisure: private and hire boats dominate traffic, while scheduled boat services operate on the Thames from wharves on the Reading side of the river near Caversham Bridge.

=== Road ===
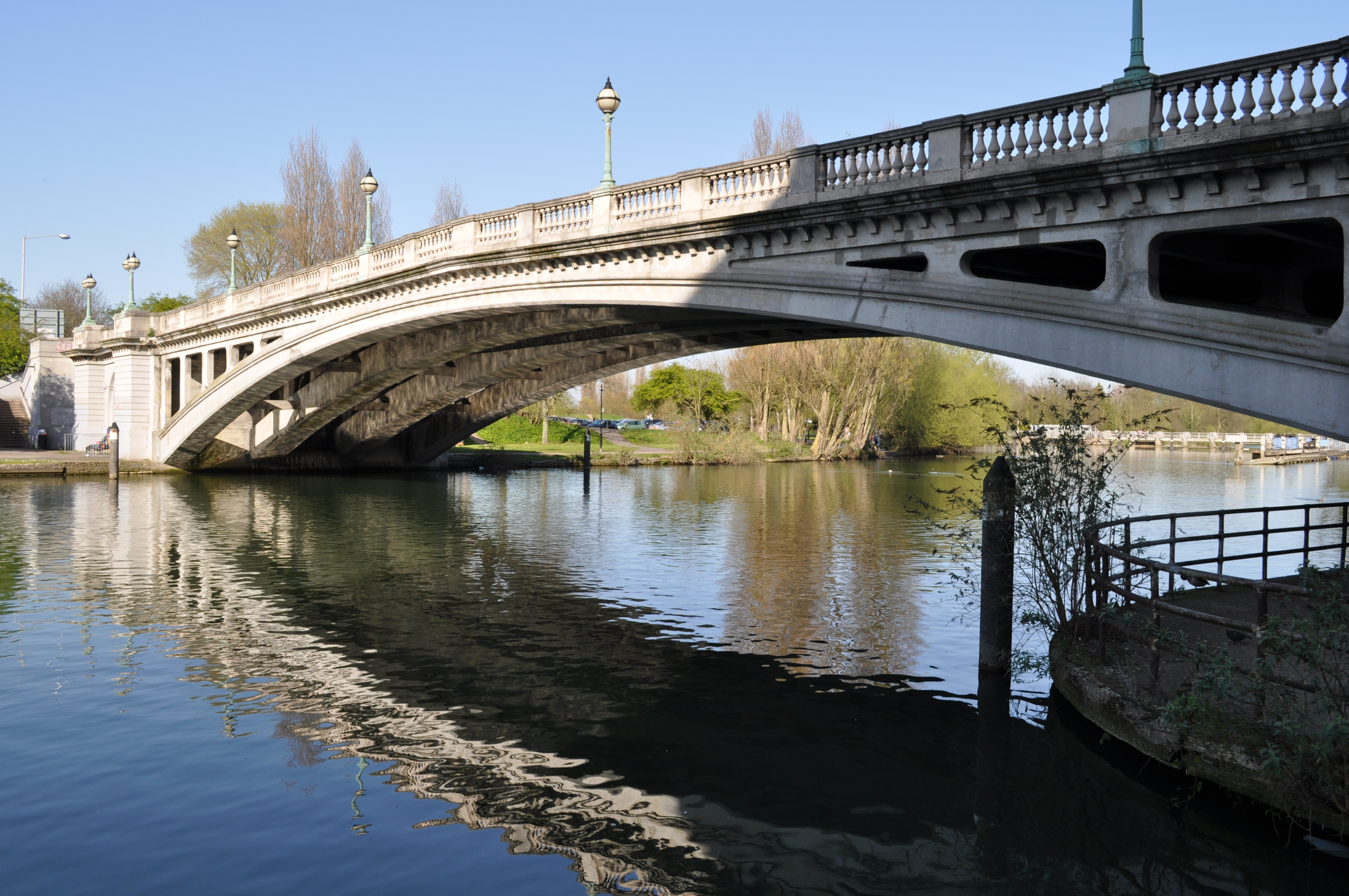
Reading Bridge was, when built, the longest reinforced concrete span in the United Kingdom

Reading was a major staging point on the old Bath Road (A4) from London to Avonmouth near Bristol. This road still carries local traffic, but has now been replaced for long-distance traffic by the M4 motorway, which closely skirts the borough and serves it with three junctions, J10-J12. Other main roads serving Reading include the A33, A327, A329, A4074 and A4155. Within Reading there is the Inner Distribution Road (IDR), a ring road for local traffic. The IDR is linked with the M4 by the A33 relief road.

Reading's two rivers constrain road traffic within the town, with the limited number of bridges forming pinch-points. The Thames is crossed just twice in the town, by Reading Bridge and Caversham Bridge. Several road bridges cross the Kennet, the oldest surviving one of which is High Bridge.

Reading has two operational park and ride sites. Mereoak, a short distance south of Junction 11 of the M4, is also a stop for National Express between London and the West. A site outside the Winnersh Triangle railway station opened in 2015 and is easily accessed from the junction where the A329(M) becomes the A3290.

=== Rail ===
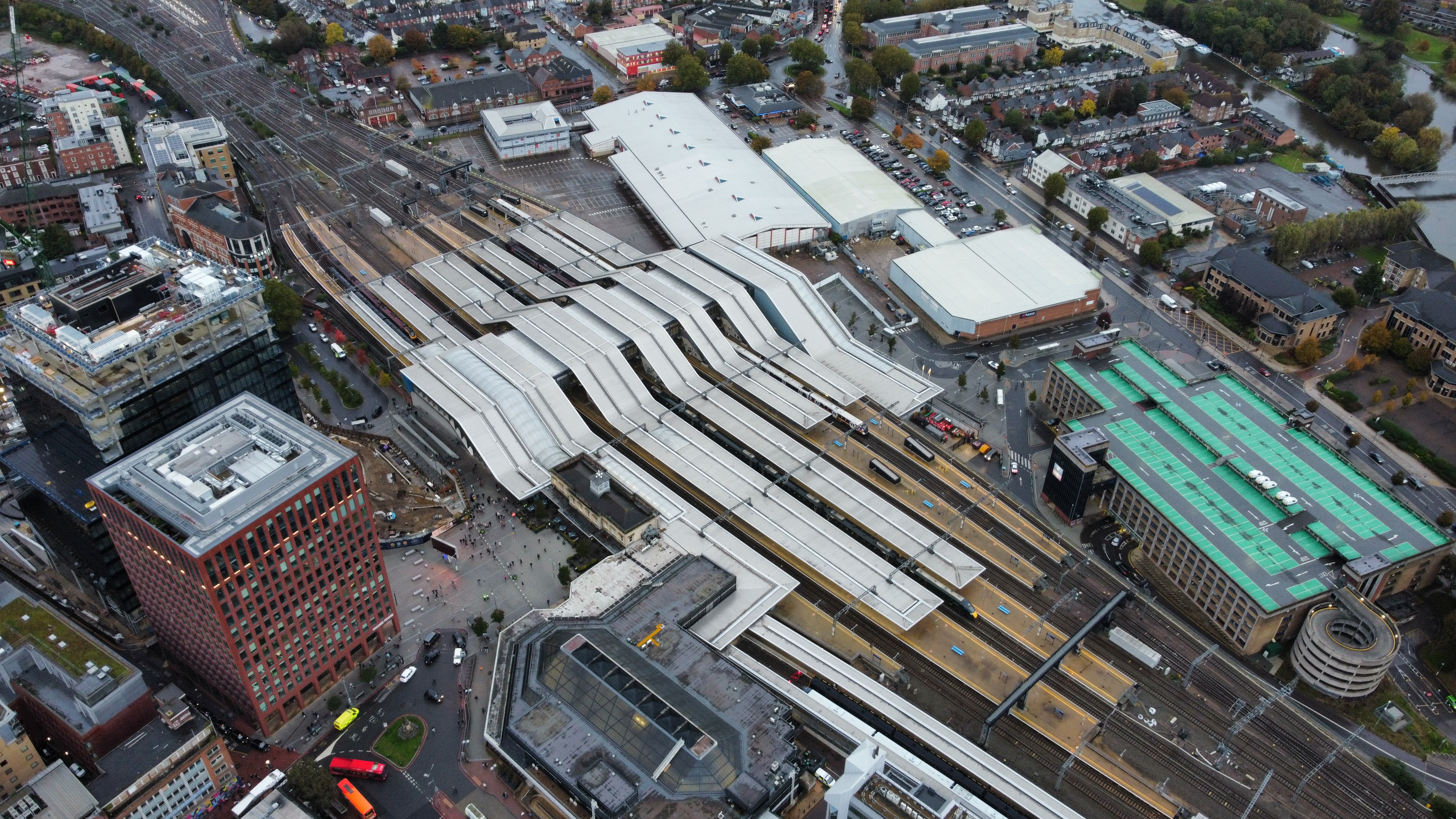
Aerial view of Reading station and its 15 platforms in October 2023

Reading is a major junction point of the National Rail system, and hence Reading station is a transfer point and terminus. In a project that finished in 2015, Reading station was redeveloped at a cost of £850 million, with grade separation of some conflicting traffic flows, and extra platforms, to relieve severe congestion at this station. Railway lines link Reading to both Paddington and Waterloo stations in London. Other stations in the Reading area are Reading West, Reading Green Park, Tilehurst and Earley.

Reading is a western terminus of the Elizabeth line, which provides stopping services to London Paddington, and means Reading is featured on the London Tube map. Cross-London connections are possible from Reading to Abbey Wood and Shenfield in the east.

=== Air ===
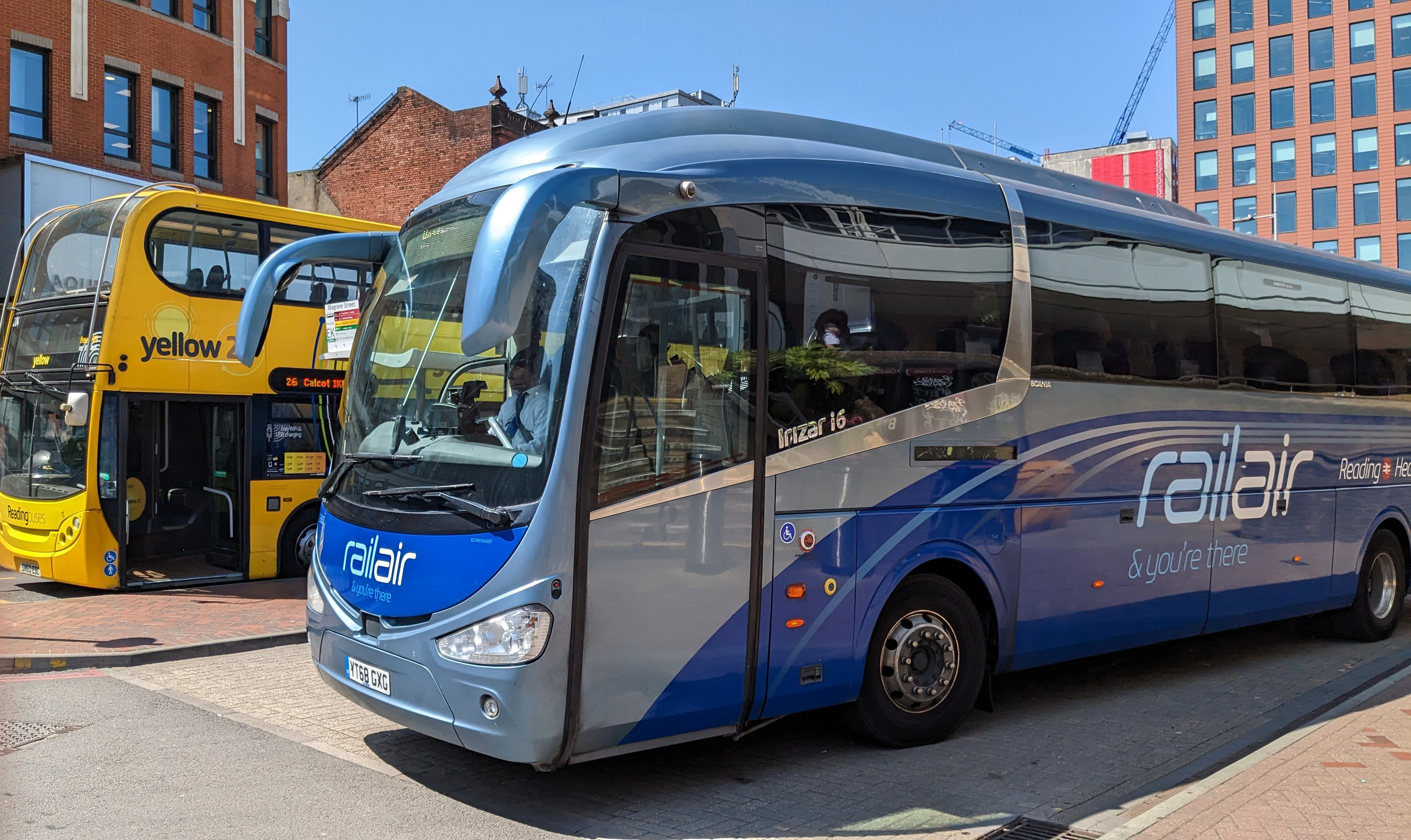
RailAir coach at Reading station

There have been two airfields in or near Reading, one at Coley Park and one at Woodley, but they have both closed. The nearest international airport is London Heathrow, 20 miles (32 km) away. An express bus service named RailAir links Reading with Heathrow, or the airport can be accessed by rail by taking the Elizabeth line to Hayes & Harlington and changing for a connecting service to Heathrow. This journey takes around 45 minutes by rail.

London City Airport can be reached via a direct train to Custom House on the Elizabeth line followed by a short bus connection. Gatwick Airport can be accessed via a direct local train operating via Guildford, and Luton and Stansted airports can be accessed with one change in Central London. Further afield, Southampton Airport can be accessed directly by rail in around 50–70 minutes depending on the service, or reached by road in approximately the same timeframe.

=== Public transport ===
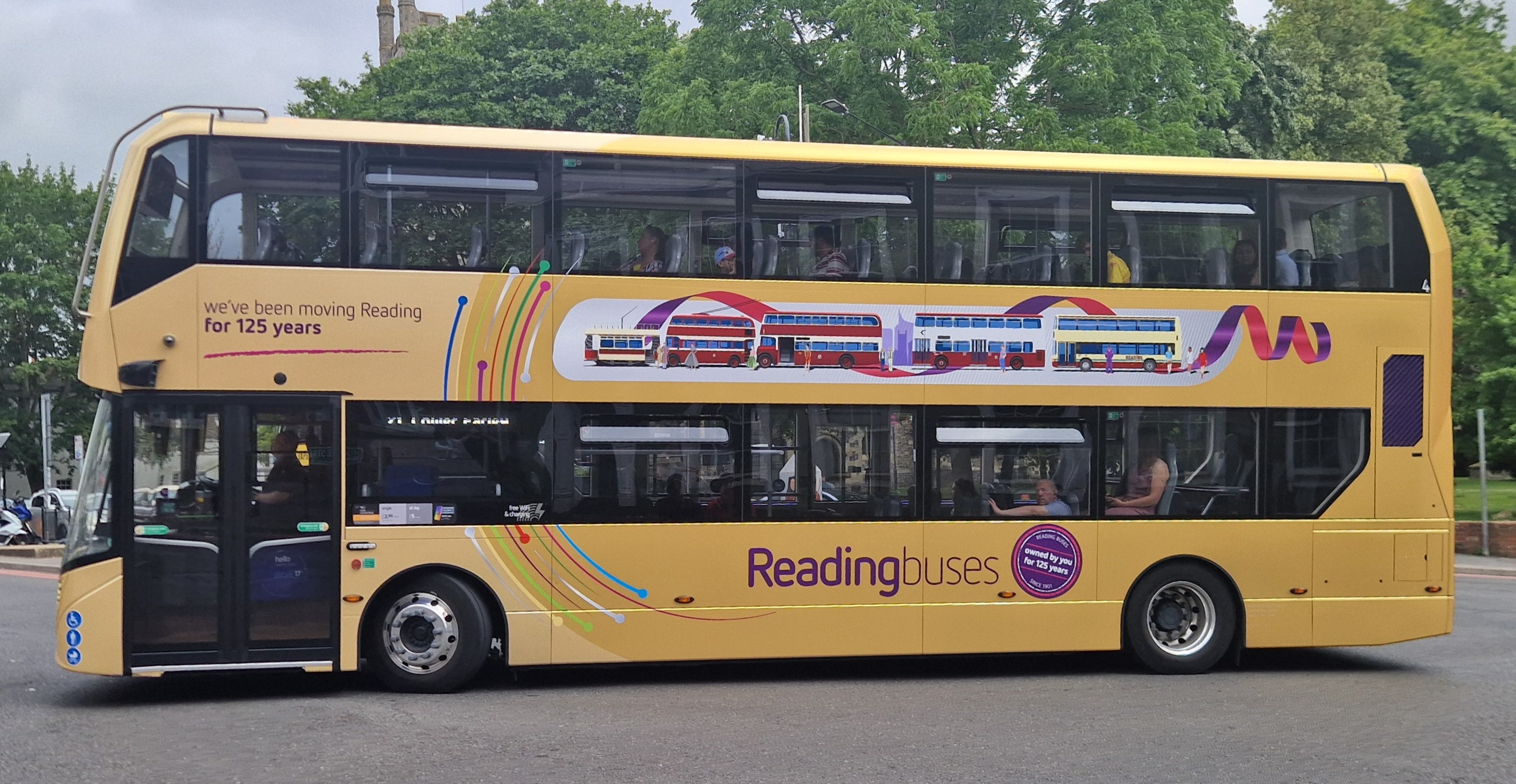
One of Reading Buses new electric double-deckers painted to celebrate the company's history

Today local public transport is largely by road, which is often affected by peak hour congestion in the borough. A frequent local bus network within the borough, and a less frequent network in the surrounding area, are provided by Reading Buses - one of the few remaining municipal bus companies in the country - and its subsidiaries Newbury & District and Thames Valley Buses. Other bus operators serving Reading include Carousel Buses, Thames Travel and RedRose. ReadiBus provides an on-demand transport service for people with restricted mobility in the area.

=== Bike sharing ===
In March 2011, Reading Borough Council approved a bike sharing scheme similar to London Cycle Hire Scheme, with 1,000 bicycles available at up to 150 docking stations across Reading. However this scheme came to an end in March 2019, with the operator unable to cover the operational costs or find a sponsor.

== Religion ==
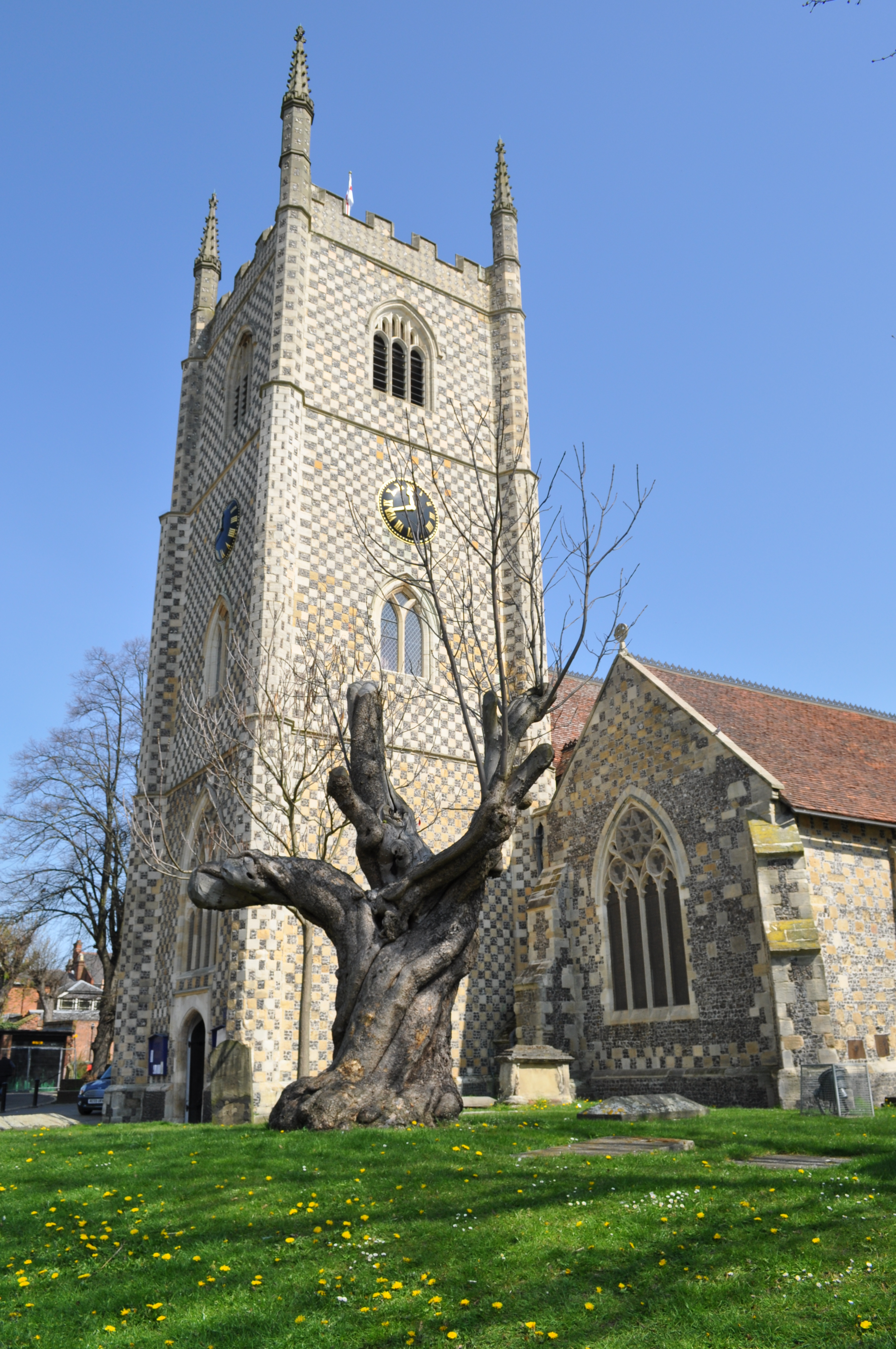
St Mary's Church tower, chequered with flint and ashlar

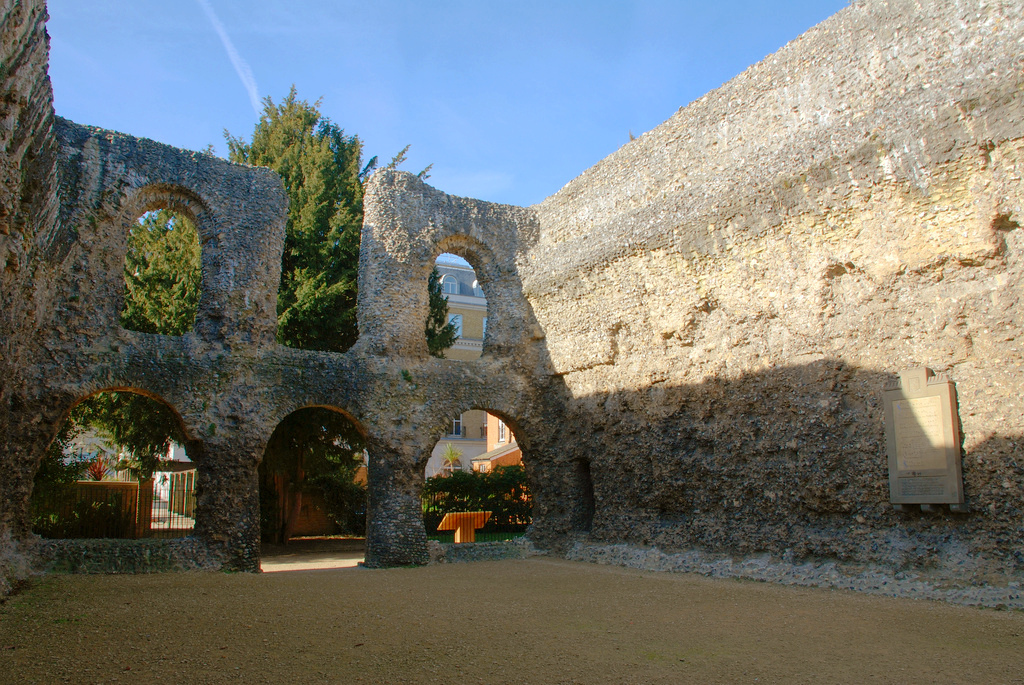
The interior of the ruined chapter house

Reading Minster (the Minster Church of St Mary the Virgin) is Reading's oldest ecclesiastical foundation, known to have been founded by the 9th century and possibly earlier. Although eclipsed in importance by the later abbey, Reading Minster has regained its importance since the destruction of the abbey. Reading Abbey was founded by Henry I in 1121. He was buried there, as were parts of his daughter Empress Matilda, William of Poitiers, Constance of York, and Princess Isabella of Cornwall, among others. The abbey was one of the pilgrimage centres of medieval England; it held over 230 relics including the hand of St. James. Today all that remains of the abbey are the inner rubble cores of the walls of many of the major buildings of the abbey, together with a much restored inner gateway and the intact hospitium.

The medieval borough of Reading was served by three parish churches: Reading Minster, St Giles' Church, and St Laurence's Church. All are still in use by the Church of England. The Franciscan friars built a friary in the town in 1311. After the friars were expelled in 1538, the building was used as a hospital, a poorhouse, and a jail, before being restored as the Church of England parish church of Greyfriars Church in 1863. The Bishop of Reading is a suffragan bishop within the Church of England's Diocese of Oxford. The bishop is based in Reading, and is responsible for the archdeaconry of Berkshire. There are a total of 18 Church of England parish churches in Reading.

St James's Church was built on a portion of the site of the abbey between 1837 and 1840, and marked the return of the Roman Catholic faith to Reading. Reading was also the site of the death of Blessed Dominic Barberi, the Catholic missionary to England in the 19th century who received John Henry Newman into the Catholic faith. There are now eight Roman Catholic parish churches in Reading. Kings Road Baptist Church was founded in Reading in 1640 or 1641. In addition to Catholicism and the Church of England, the Seventh-Day Adventist denomination is also represented in the town, particularly by Reading West SDA Church on Loverock Road, Reading Central SDA Church on Tilehurst Road, and various other churches around Reading.

Reading has had an organised Jewish community since 1886. At least one Jewish family living in the area has been traced back as far as 1842. The group grew to 13 families, who in 1886 declared themselves a community and commenced building a synagogue. On 31 October 1900, Reading Hebrew Congregation officially opened in a solemn public ceremony, packed to capacity with dignitaries, led by the Chief Rabbi Hermann Adler. Reading Hebrew Congregation, which still stands on its original site at the junction of Goldsmid Road and Clifton Street near the town centre, is a Grade II-listed building, built to a traditional design in the Moorish style. The community is affiliated with the Orthodox United Hebrew Congregations of the Commonwealth. Reading also has a Liberal Jewish community which convenes in the Reading Quaker Meeting House, a Modern Orthodox Judaism community, an active Jewish Society for students at the university, as well as being served by a Reform Jewish community which convenes in nearby Maidenhead Synagogue.

There are presently three mosques in Reading, initially just having the Central Reading Mosque on Waylen Street. The £3–4 million Abu Bakr Islamic Centre, on Oxford Road in West Reading, was granted planning permission in 2002. The community-funded project began construction in 2007, and opened its doors in July 2013 - the holy month of Ramadan for this year. A second Islamic centre in eastern Reading has also been granted planning permission. This £4M project has garnered some controversy. Reading also has places of worship of other religions: the Shantideva Mahayana Buddhist centre, a Hindu temple, a Sikh gurdwara, a Salvation Army citadel, a Quaker meeting house, and a Christadelphian Hall.

== Sport ==
=== Football ===
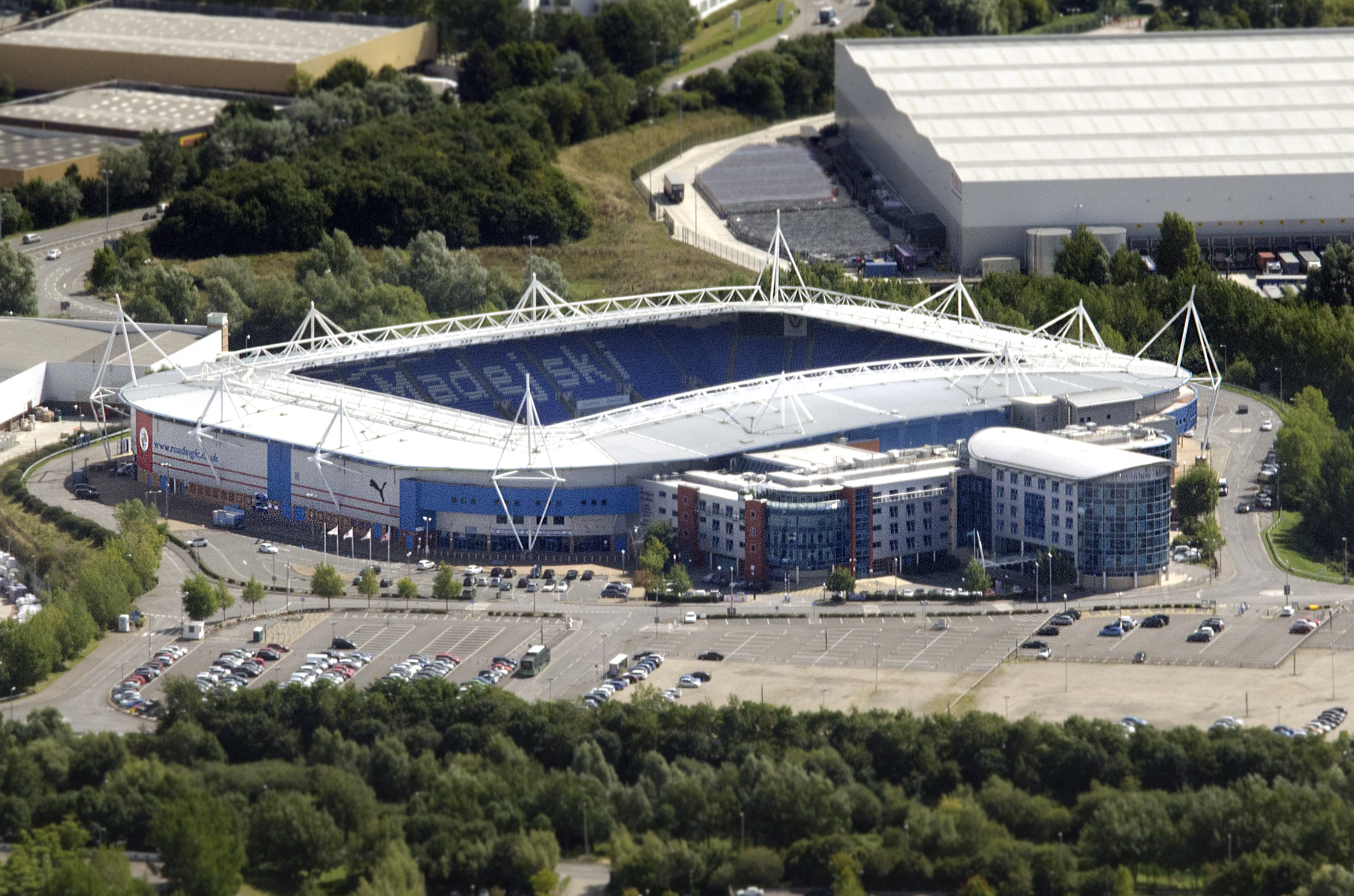
The Madjeski Stadium, home of Reading Football Club

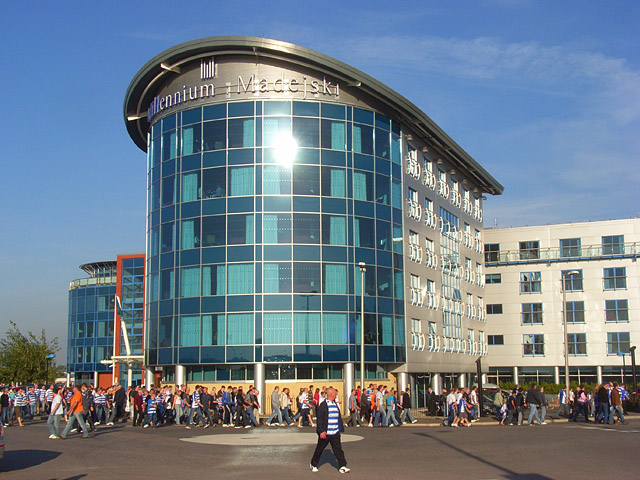
The Voco Reading Hotel, pictured when still known as the Millennium Madejski

Reading is the home of Reading Football Club, an association football club nicknamed The Royals, formed in 1871. Formerly nicknamed 'The Biscuitmen' and based at Elm Park, the club plays at the 24,161 capacity Madjeski Stadium, first named after chairman Sir John Madejski which opened in 1998, and later renamed under a sponsorship deal as the "Select Car Leasing Stadium" in 2021, after a sponsor. After winning the 2005–06 Football League Championship with a record of 106 points, Reading spent two seasons in the Premier League before being relegated to The Championship. For the 2012–2013 season, the club again competed in the Premier League, after securing first place in the Championship in the 2011–2012 season, but were relegated back down to the Championship at season's end. Reading Town Football Club, formed in 1966, played at Scours Lane and were playing in the Hellenic League Premier Division but were dissolved in 2016, while fellow non-league football club Reading City Football Club now play at Scours Lane after moving from Palmer Park Stadium at the end of the 2015–16 season. Scours Lane was also renamed to Rivermoor Stadium in 2016.

=== Other sports ===
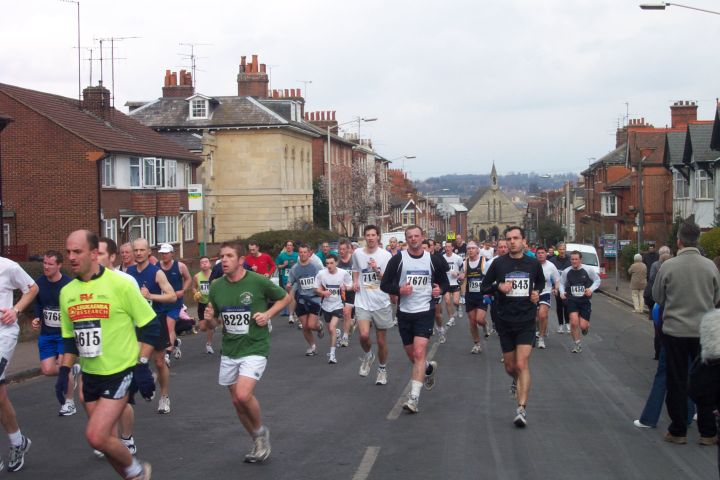
The Reading Half Marathon 2004 climbing Russell Street in West Reading

Reading is home to three senior semi-professional rugby clubs: Reading Abbey RFC, Rams RFC and Reading RFC. The Reading Rockets are the town's semi-professional basketball team. They compete in the second tier English Basketball League Division 1, though they have tried several times in recent years to move up to the top tier British Basketball League. They play home games at Loddon Valley Leisure Centre. During the 2024-25 Season, they were able to win 3 of the available Domestic Trophies. The town hosts Australian Rules football team Reading Kangaroos and American football team Berkshire Renegades. Palmer Park Stadium has a velodrome and athletics track. It is used by Reading Athletic Club and the Berkshire Renegades for training. Reading Hockey Club enter teams in both the Men's and Women's England Hockey Leagues.

Rowing is pursued by the Reading Rowing Club and the Reading University Boat Club, both next to Caversham Bridge, whilst Reading Blue Coat School trains at Sonning adjacent to the Redgrave Pinsent Rowing Lake in Caversham, which provides training facilities for the Great Britain National Squad. However, almost all club rowing is done on the River Thames. The annual Reading Town Regatta takes place near Thames Valley Park, with the Reading Amateur Regatta taking place in June, usually two weeks before the Henley Royal Regatta. The town was home to a motorcycle speedway team, Reading Racers. Speedway came to Reading in 1968 at Tilehurst Stadium, until the team moved to Smallmead Stadium in Whitley, which was demolished at the end of 2008. The team is inactive pending the building of a new stadium, which was once hoped to be completed in 2012. The Reading Racers reformed in 2016 and joined the new Southern Developmental League upon its formation in 2017 winning its inaugural season undefeated. The team started back up in Eastbourne and have raced in Swindon awaiting return to a track in Reading.

The Reading Half Marathon is held on the streets of Reading in March of each year, with 16,000 competitors from elite to fun runners. It was first run in 1983 and has taken place in every subsequent year except 2001, when it was cancelled because of concerns over that year's outbreak of foot-and-mouth disease, 2018, when it was cancelled on the morning of the race due to heavy overnight snowfall, and 2020, when it was cancelled due to the COVID-19 pandemic. The British Triathlon Association was formed at the town's former Mall health club on 11 December 1982. Britain's first ever triathlon took place just outside Reading at Kirtons's Farm in Pingewood in 1983 and was revived 10 years' later by Banana Leisure with one of the original organisers as Event Director. Thames Valley Triathletes, based in the town, is Britain's oldest triathlon club, having its origins in the 1984 event at nearby Heckfield, when a relay team raced under the name Reading Triathlon Club. The Hexagon was home to snooker's Grand Prix tournament, one of the sport's "Big Four", from 1984 to 1994.

== Twin towns ==
Reading is twinned with:

- Düsseldorf, Germany (since 1947, officially since 1988)
- Clonmel, Ireland (since 1994)
- San Francisco Libre, Nicaragua (since 1994)
- Speightstown, Barbados (since 2003)

Though not twinned with Reading, two suburbs of the New Zealand city of Dunedin—Caversham and Forbury—were named after places in and around Reading by early New Zealand settler and Reading native William Henry Valpy.

== See also ==
- 2020 Reading stabbings
- List of administrative counties and county boroughs of England by population in 1971
- List of college towns
- List of conservation areas in England
- List of English districts
- List of non-US places that have a US place named after them
- List of towns in England
- List of unitary authorities of England
- Murder of Emily Salvini
- Reading power station

== Bibliography ==
- Cameron, Kenneth (1961). English Place Names. Oxford, UK: Taylor & Francis. Archived from the original on 15 January 2023.
- Dils, Joan (1998). An Historical Atlas of Berkshire. Reading, UK: Berkshire Record Society. ISBN 978-0-9524946-5-2. Archived from the original on 15 January 2023.
- "The borough of Reading: Introduction", A History of the County of Berkshire, vol. 3, London: Victoria County History, pp. 336–342
- Fasham, Pete; Hawkes, John (1983). Reading Abbey Rediscovered. Trust for Wessex Archeology.
- Hunter, Judith (1995). A History of Berkshire. Chichester, UK: Phillimore. ISBN 978-0-85033-729-7. Archived from the original on 15 January 2023.
- Hylton, Stuart (2007). A History of Reading. Chichester, UK: Philimore. ISBN 978-1-86077-458-4. Archived from the original on 15 January 2023.
- Kidner, R. W. (1982) [1974]. The Reading to Tonbridge Line. Locomotion Papers (3rd ed.). Salisbury, UK: The Oakwood Press. ISBN 9780853611561. ISSN 0305-5493. Archived from the original on 15 January 2023.
- Lawes Long, Henry (1836). Observations upon certain Roman roads and towns in the south of Britain. Whitefish, US: Kessinger Legacy. Archived from the original on 15 January 2023.
- Phillips, Daphne (1980). The Story of Reading. Newbury, UK: Countryside Books. ISBN 978-0-905392-07-3. Archived from the original on 15 January 2023.
- Slade, Cecil (2001). The Town of Reading and Its Abbey. Reading, UK: MRM Associates Limited. ISBN 978-0-9517719-4-5. Archived from the original on 15 January 2023.
- Sowan, Adam (2004). Abattoirs Road to Zinzan Street. Reading, UK: Two Rivers Press. ISBN 978-1-901677-36-2. Archived from the original on 15 January 2023.
- Waters, Laurence (1990). Reading. Rail Centres. Shepperton, UK: Ian Allan. ISBN 978-0-7110-1937-9. Archived from the original on 15 January 2023.
- Wykes, Alan (1970). Reading. London: Macmillan. ISBN 9780333061190. Archived from the original on 15 January 2023.
