= ReadiBus =

Transport service for disabled people in Reading, England

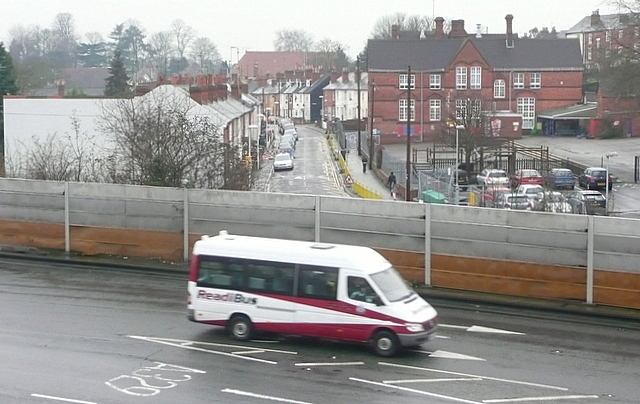
ReadiBus on the IDR with Coley in the background

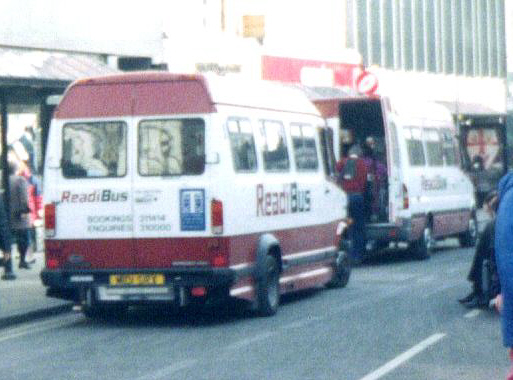
ReadiBus's on Broad Street in 1999

ReadiBus is an on-demand transport service for disabled people in the area of Reading, Berkshire, England. The service operates as a charity, and was founded in 1981 by a collaboration between the voluntary sector and Reading Borough Council.
