= Culture of Reading, Berkshire =

Reading is a town in the English county of Berkshire.

== Music ==
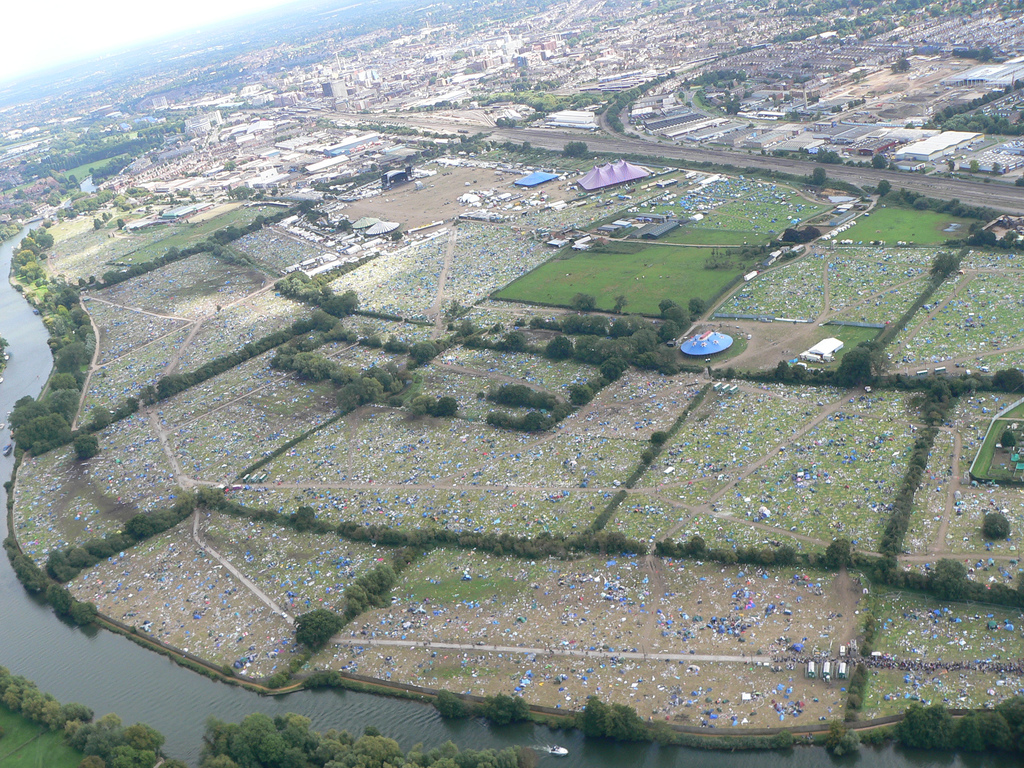
Aerial view of Reading Festival 2007

Every year, Reading hosts the Reading Festival, which has been running since 1971. The festival takes place on the Friday, Saturday and Sunday of the August bank holiday weekend. Since 1999, Reading has been twinned with a simultaneous festival in Leeds, with the same acts appearing at both festivals on different days. In 2005, the main festival spawned the Reading Fringe Festival. Set up by a group of musicians, promoters, film-makers and artists, it helps showcase acts and performers in the town's venues in the run-up to the main festival.

For some twenty years until 2006, Reading was also known for its WOMAD Festival, but the event eventually outgrew its Rivermead site. In 2007, amid much controversy, the event relocated to Malmesbury, Wiltshire in the form of WOMAD Charlton Park.

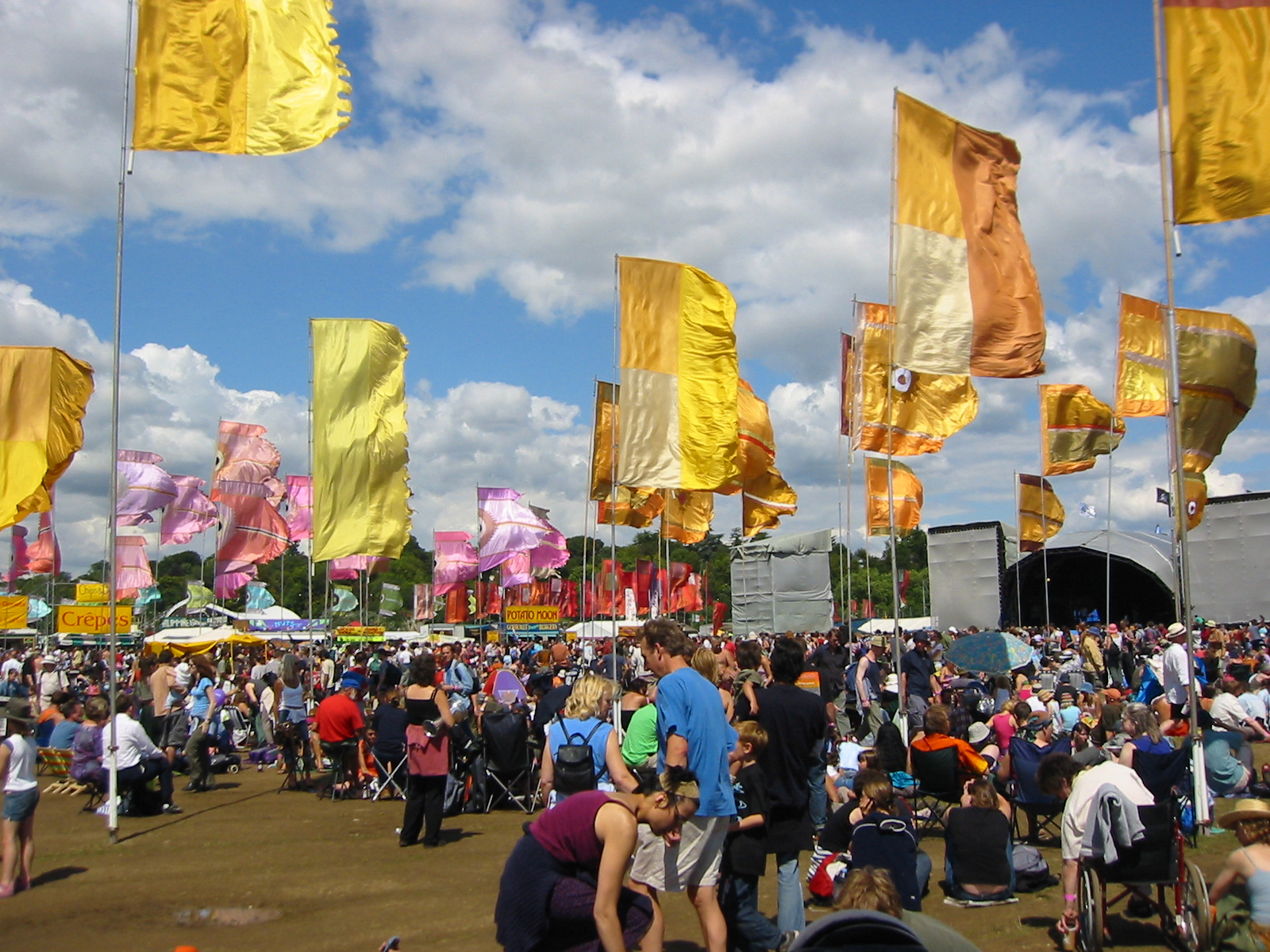
WOMAD Festival Reading 2003

Perhaps the most notable home-grown artist is Mike Oldfield of Tubular Bells fame. Slowdive, The Cooper Temple Clause, Stuart Price, Morning Runner, My Luminaries, Does It Offend You, Yeah?, OK Tokyo, Pete & The Pirates, SixNationState, Blueboy, Pure Reason Revolution, Exit Ten, Sylosis, Malefice, The Arusha Accord, Bennet and Mr Fogg have had some degree of success. Left-field experimental pop band Lemon Kittens also started life there in the late 1970s, and 60s folk-blues artist turned avant-gardist Mike Cooper also. David Byron, first and most famous singer of hard rock band Uriah Heep, lived his last years in Reading before he died in 1985. The Chemical Brothers attended Reading Blue Coat school. Lead singer of 'odd-pop' group The Hoosiers Irwin Sparkes is from Woodley. He supports Reading F.C. and in the music video for The Hoosiers' song "Goodbye Mr. A", he can be seen playing as the team on a football game. Rock singer Nathan James, finalist from Andrew Lloyd Webber musical theatre revival search show Superstar, is from Sonning-on-Thames in Berkshire.

Reading plays host to semi-professional and amateur choirs and choral societies. Reading Festival Chorus has celebrated its 60th anniversary. RFC sings a diverse music programme, with works like Mozart's Requiem, Karl Jenkins' The Armed Man in 2005 to Beethoven's Missa Solemnis and a summer programme of English and American folk songs by Tippett and Aaron Copland. Reading Bach Choir has also passed its 50th anniversary, and performs music from all eras including a new commission by Gabriel Jackson. Past repertoire has included Gesualdo, Monteverdi, Veljo Tormis, Henryk Górecki, Heinrich Biber, Michael Tippett, John Tavener and George Shearing.|

Reading has several orchestras. The long-established Reading Symphony Orchestra (RSO) is one of the town's amateur orchestras, led by a professional conductor and leader. It presents four main concerts a year, and is often engaged to work in collaboration with other musical organisations and for private functions. The Aldworth Philharmonic Orchestra (APO), founded in 2002 and named after Richard Aldworth, the founder of Reading Blue Coat School, rehearses and plays most of its concerts at the school. APO's remit is to be as innovative as possible, giving local people the chance to play by rehearsing exclusively at weekends, attracting a wider audience to classical music (especially younger people) through its 'Concert Virgin Scheme' and education projects, and championing the music of talented young composers. Reading Youth Orchestra (RYO) provides an opportunity for younger musicians.

Berkshire Music Trust provides music making opportunities for young people in Berkshire and is based at Stoneham Court in Tilehurst, Reading. The trust supports hundreds of young musicians across the county, offering teacher-run groups such as regional and local choirs, orchestras and bands – many of which regularly perform at national and international level.

== Theatre ==
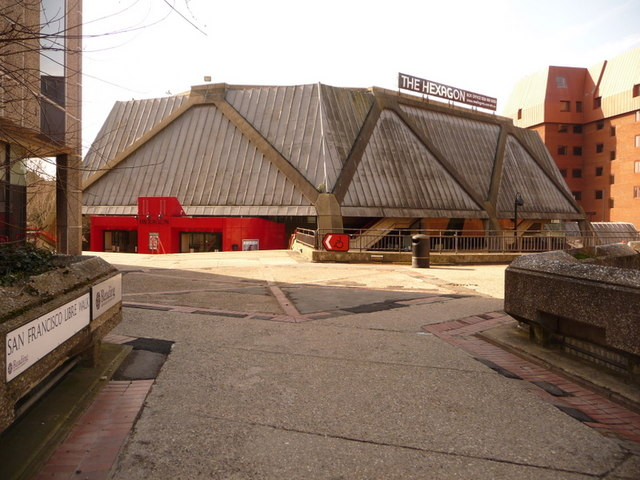
The Hexagon viewed from San Francisco Libre Walk

Reading theatre venues include the Hexagon and South Street Arts Centre, which are professional venues supported by Reading Borough Council, and Reading Rep Theatre, a professional independent venue founded in 2012. The Hexagon is a multi-purpose venue in the heart of Reading that provides rock, pop, comedy, classical music and dance as well as theatre. Performances have included Reel Big Fish and their mix of ska-punk as well as comedy from Russell Howard. South Street presents performing arts from both the professional and community sectors, including fringe theatre, comedy, music, dance and live literature. Reading Rep Theatre is Reading's only repertory theatre, with a mixture of original and touring productions, as well as private classes and a community engagement programme.

Amateur theatre venues in Reading include Progress Theatre, a self-governing, self-funding theatre group and registered charity founded in 1947 that operates and maintains its own 97-seat theatre. Progress Theatre produces a yearly open air Shakespeare production in Caversham Court Gardens, having previously occupied the Reading Abbey Ruins.

Golden Globe- and Oscar-winning actress Kate Winslet was born and brought up in Reading. Her ex-husband, award-winning director Sam Mendes, was also born in Reading.

Reading is also home to the Rep College. Established in 1997 it is based at the Rising Sun Arts Centre in Silver Street. It is a professional training college for actors and produces 14 public shows each year.

== Arts ==
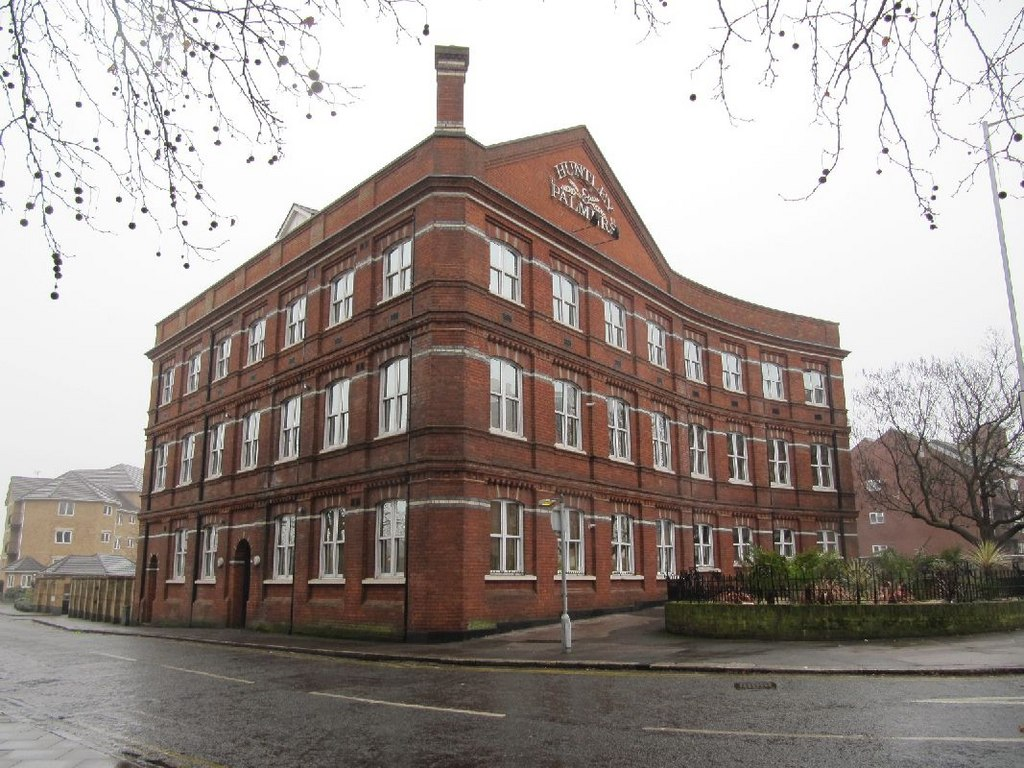
The remaining Huntley & Palmers building was an arts centre for a while

Reading has a history of grassroots arts movements. The unoccupied 21 South Street, previously a school and an unemployment (dole) office, was temporarily squatted by artists in March 1985 and this action eventually led to its becoming a council run arts centre. Similarly, an occupation of the condemned former Huntley & Palmers building in 1989 took place by a collective of artists, calling it the Biscuit Base, in an attempt to put pressure on Reading Borough Council to provide more art space. This action did not secure it as art space, but did eventually lead to it being recognised by the council as a historic building. The facade was reprieved from demolition and converted to housing. In 1990, participants in the failed Biscuit Base action occupied a former temperance house in Silver Street which became the town's independent art centre, The Rising Sun Arts Centre.

There are a number of works of public art in Reading.

=== Media ===
Reading has three local newspapers, The Reading Chronicle published weekly, on Thursdays and The Reading Post published on Wednesday and Fridays. A local publishing company, the Two Rivers Press, has published over 70 book titles, many on the topic of local history and art.

BBC Radio Berkshire broadcasts from Reading. Other local radio stations, such as Heart South, Capital London, and Greatest Hits Radio South are also available.

Local television news programmes are the BBC's South Today and ITV's Meridian Tonight.

== Literature ==
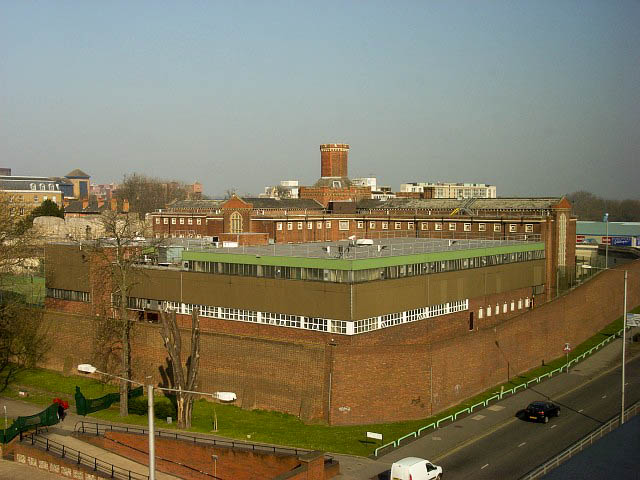
Reading Gaol, one-time home to Oscar Wilde

Reading's best known literary connection is with Oscar Wilde, who was imprisoned in Reading Gaol from 1895 to 1897. While he was there, he wrote De Profundis, which was published in 1905. After his release, he lived in exile in France and wrote The Ballad of Reading Gaol, based on his experience of an execution carried out in Reading Gaol whilst he was imprisoned there. It was first published in 1898 under the pseudonym C.3.3, Wilde's erstwhile cell number.

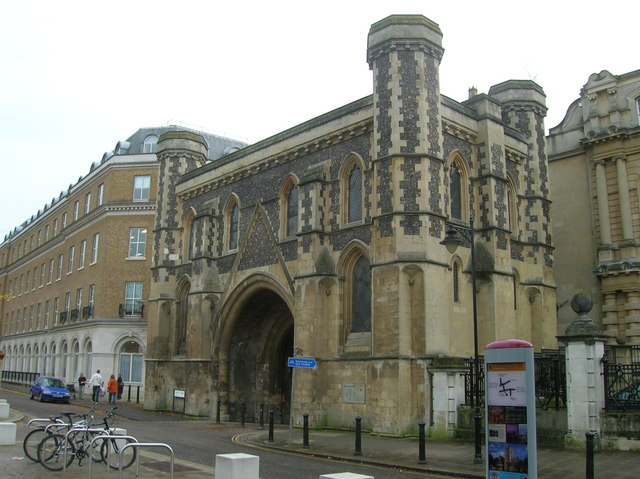
The Abbey Gateway, where Jane Austen went to school

Other authors lived in and around Reading. Jane Austen attended Reading Ladies Boarding School, based in the Abbey Gateway, in 1784–86. Mary Russell Mitford lived in Reading for a number of years and then spent the rest of her life just outside the town at Three Mile Cross and Swallowfield. Thomas Noon Talfourd, the judge and dramatist was born in Reading and later became MP for the town.

Blessed Dominic of the Mother of God, born Dominic Barberi (22 June 1792 – 27 August 1849), an Italian theologian and author, died in Reading. On 27 August 1849 he was travelling from London to Woodchester when, at Pangbourne, he suffered a heart attack. On being taken to the Railway Tavern at Reading (later the Duke of Edinburgh Hotel, now demolished) he died after being given absolution. He was beatified by Pope Paul VI in 1963.

Several authors have written about Reading. Thomas Hardy painted a rather disparaging picture of the town, lightly disguised as Aldbrickham, in his 1895 novel Jude the Obscure. Jerome K. Jerome also did not warm to the town on his famous journey up the Thames in Three Men in a Boat (1888). He does, however, recognise the historical significance of Reading. Jasper Fforde set his series of Jack Spratt literary crime novels in this town. The comic novel A Melon for Ecstasy by John Fortune and John Wells is set in and around Reading.

T. E. Lawrence lost the first draft of his Seven Pillars of Wisdom at Reading railway station. Charles Dickens was asked to stand as MP for Reading, but declined. He became president of the Reading Athenaeum. In his novel Bleak House, Esther Summerson goes to school in Reading. His great-granddaughter Monica Dickens died in Reading in 1992.

Patrick Hamilton set his 1953 novel, Mr. Stimpson and Mr. Gorse, in Reading.

== Other ==
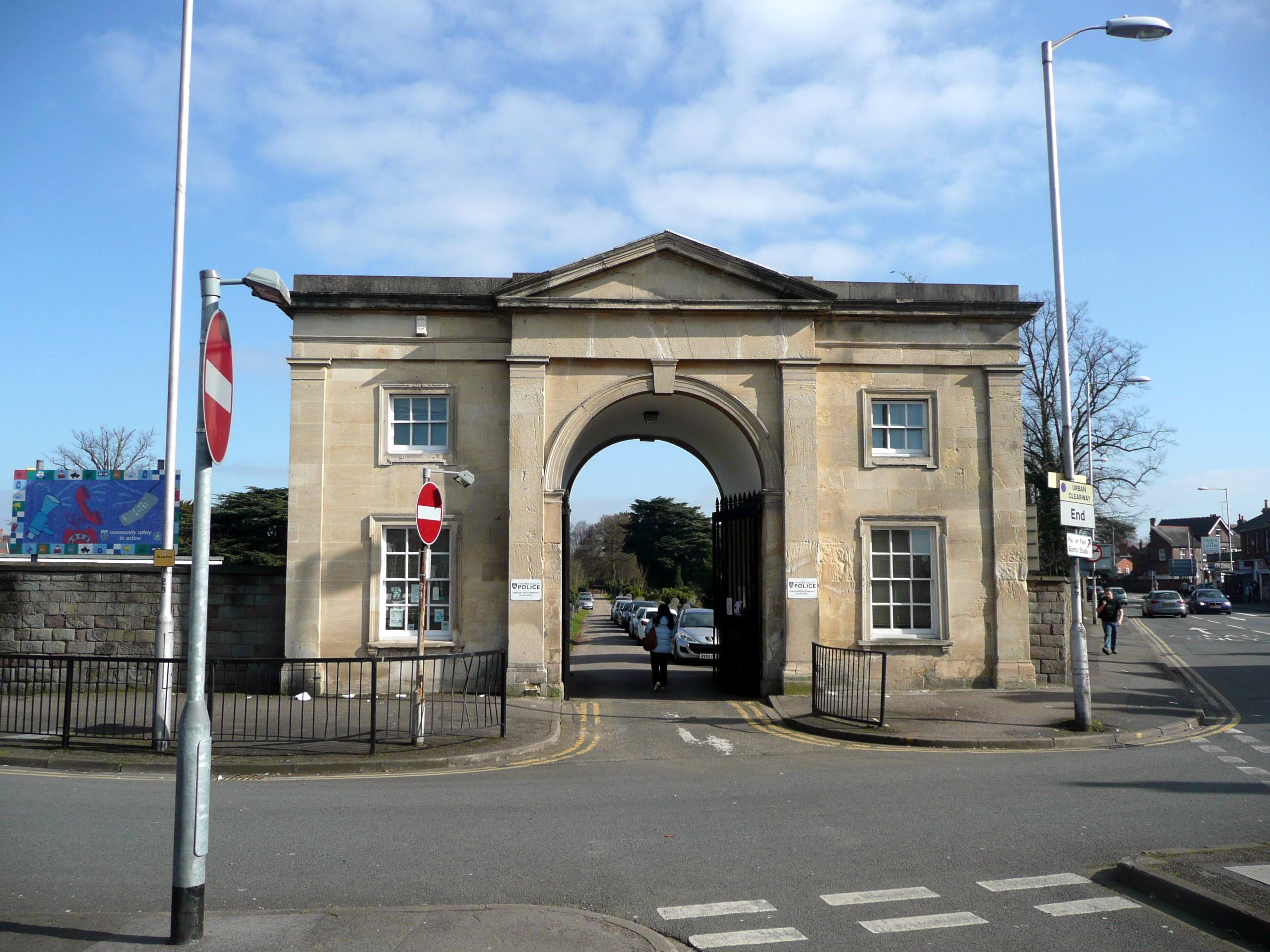
Entrance to the Reading Old Cemetery at Cemetery Junction in East Reading

When Ricky Gervais (born in Reading) used to perform a stand-up comedy segment on the British TV show The 11 O'Clock Show, he would often (comically) describe the residents of the Reading suburb Whitley as the lowest members of society. This turned Whitley into a household name for the duration of the series. His film Cemetery Junction although filmed elsewhere in the UK, is based in 1970s Reading and is named after a busy junction in East Reading.

The roadside chain of restaurants Little Chef began in the town back in 1958. Its first branch was a small venue that could house eleven patrons.

A Reading edition of Monopoly is available (see Localized versions of the Monopoly game). Reading is not officially a city, having missed out during the millennium celebrations when the Queen instead granted Brighton and Hove city status in 2000.

A study conducted by the Reading Borough Council in 2010 revealed that school children in Reading schools speak 150 different languages.

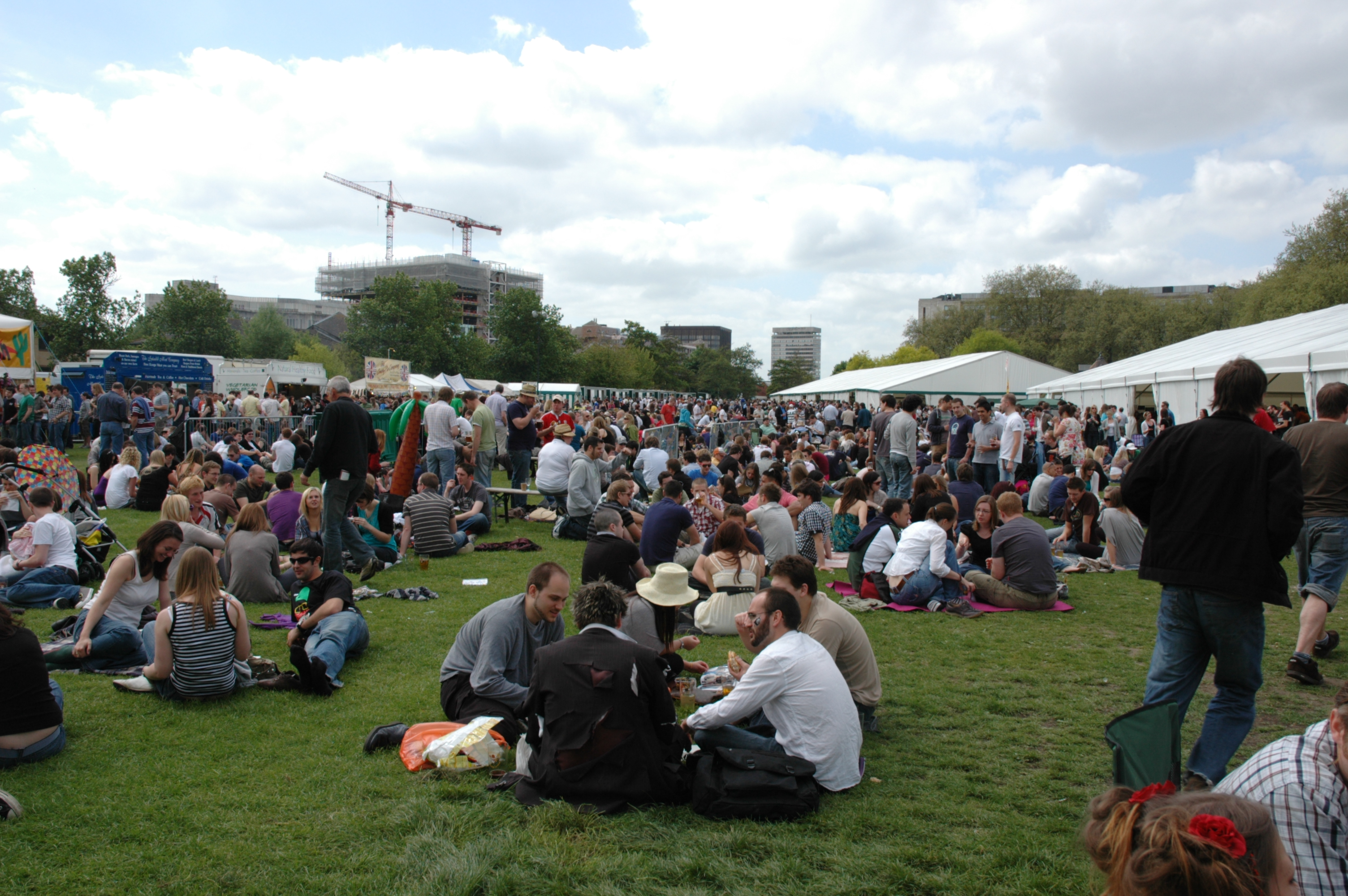
Reading Beer Festival 2009 in King's Meadow

The Reading Beer Festival was first held in 1994, and has now grown to one of the largest beer festivals in the UK. It is held at King's Meadow for the four days immediately preceding the May Day Bank Holiday every year.

In 1974, the BBC filmed The Family in Reading. The show, considered to one of the first reality television shows, followed the lives of the Wilkins family.

Reading is the location of the musical comedy television show Beautiful People, which is a fictional adaptation of the writings of Simon Doonan, who grew up in the town.

In a 2007 poll by Reader's Digest, Reading was named the worst place in Britain to live for families. However the methodology of the survey was questioned by some of the locals, with only three towns of population greater than 40,000 included amongst the "winners".

The demonym for a person from Reading can be any of Readingensian, synonymous with the local league Rugby team Redingensians based in Sonning, Readinger or Readingonian.

The Canadian news and public affairs radio show As It Happens, on CBC Radio One, frequently refers to the town in stories and interviews from the UK, noting the location of the piece by its distance from Reading. The reference is usually in both standard lengths (miles and/or kilometres) and some strange measurement linked to the story, such as the number of garden gnomes, laid end-to-end. This now-traditional joking practice began in the 1970s when a British-born producer noted on a script that a small village mentioned in a story was located 'nine miles from Reading'. It was intended to clarify the location for staff and listeners, but most were unfamiliar with the town, and it quickly became a running joke on the show to identify any story location in the UK, no matter how well-known or how far from Reading, by its distance from the town. The practice has been given credit for boosting Reading's profile in North America and also for drawing Canadian tourists who are fans of the program to visit Reading while in England.

Reading Carnival is an annual event that has been held on the May bank Holiday Monday for several years. The carnival celebrates the large West Indian community that has resided in Reading since the 1950s and its integration into the town.
