= Redlands (Reading ward) =

Electoral ward in Reading, Berkshire, England

Coordinates: 51.4475°N 0.9538°W

Redlands Ward, Borough of Reading
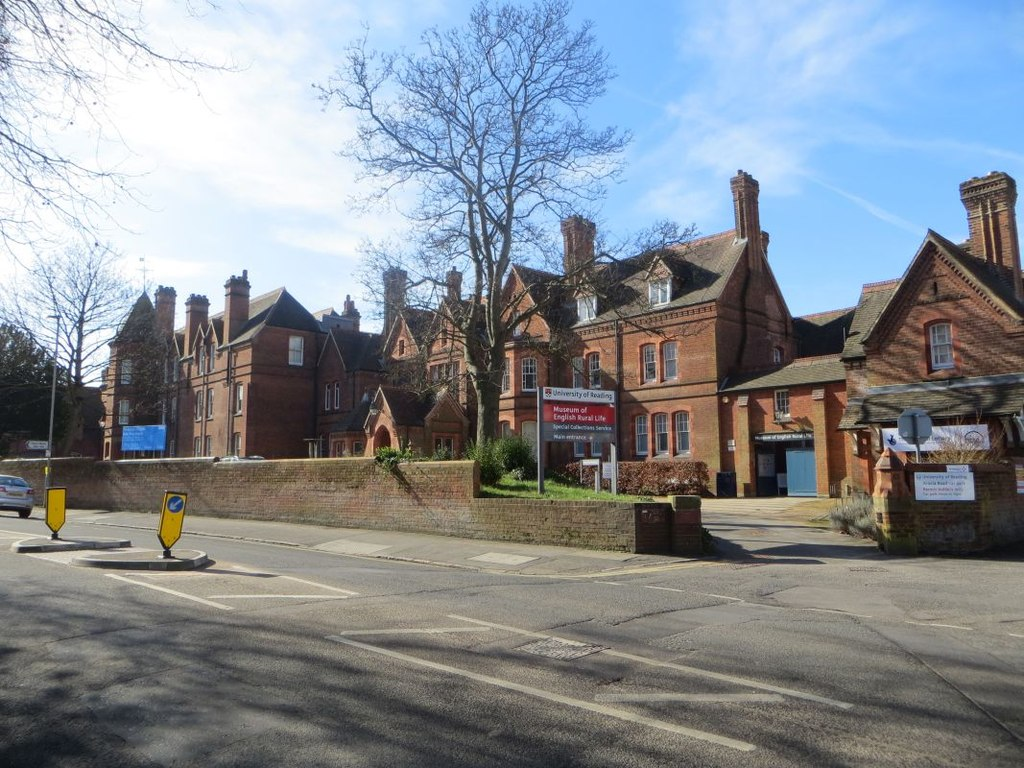
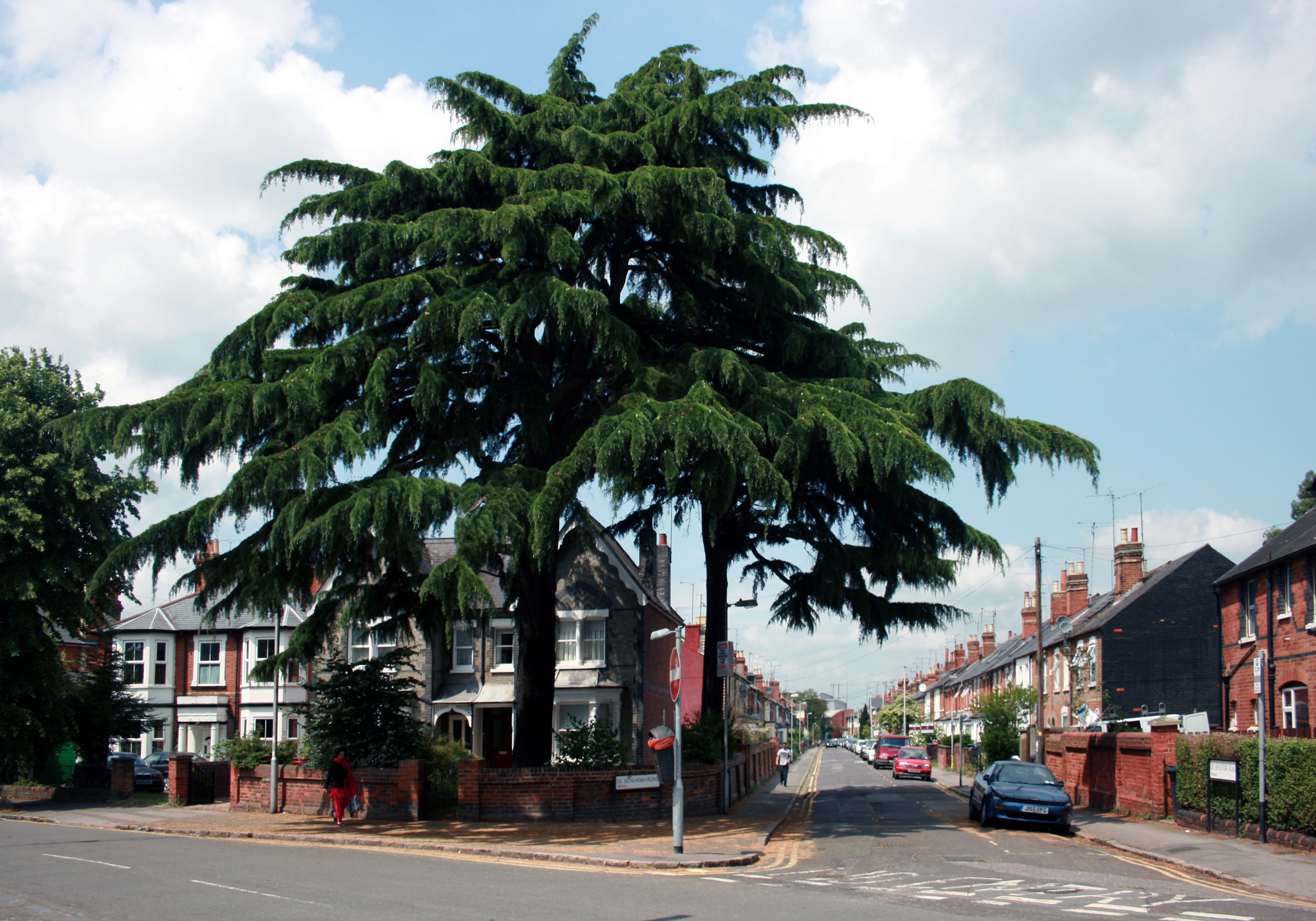
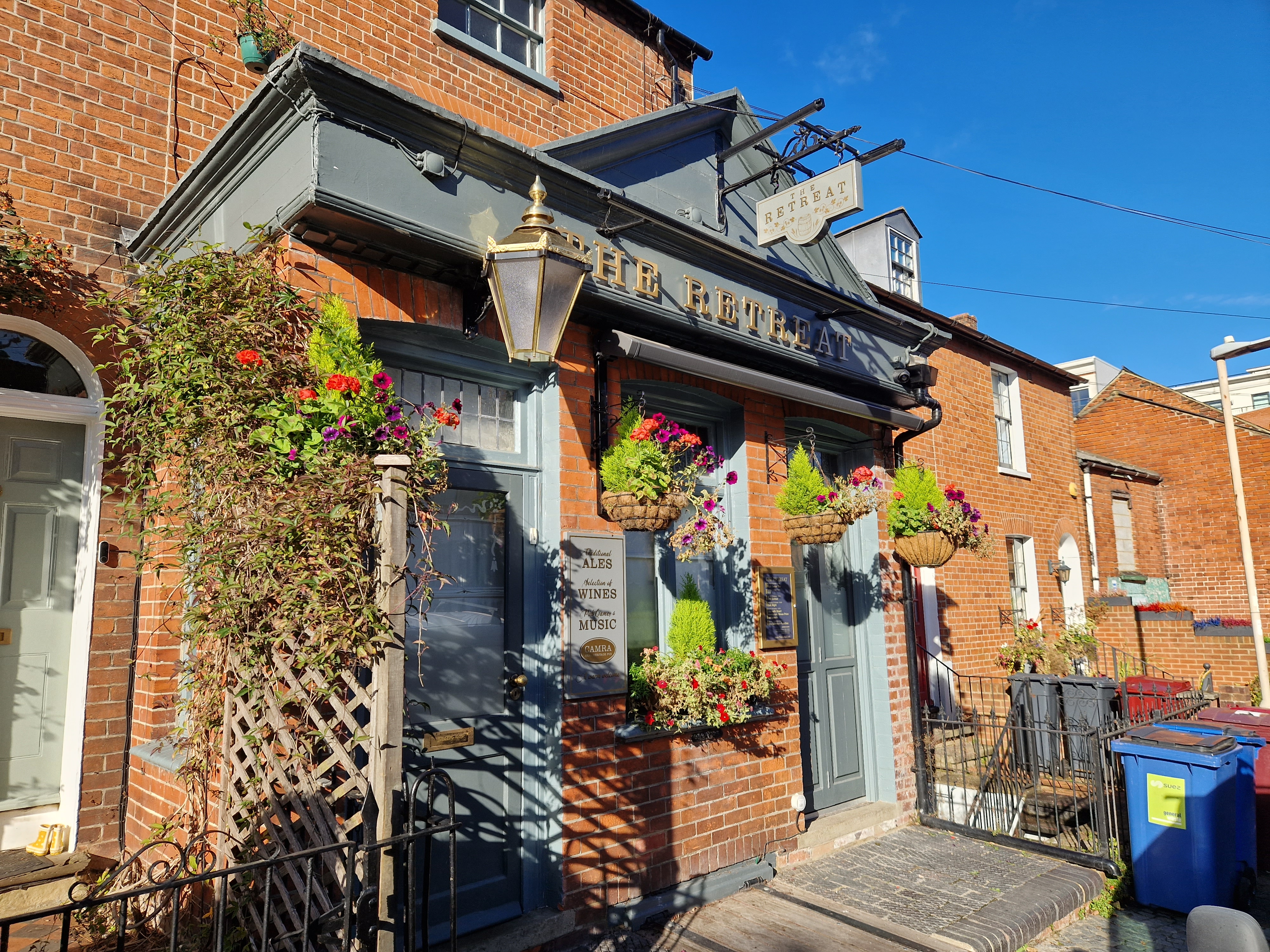
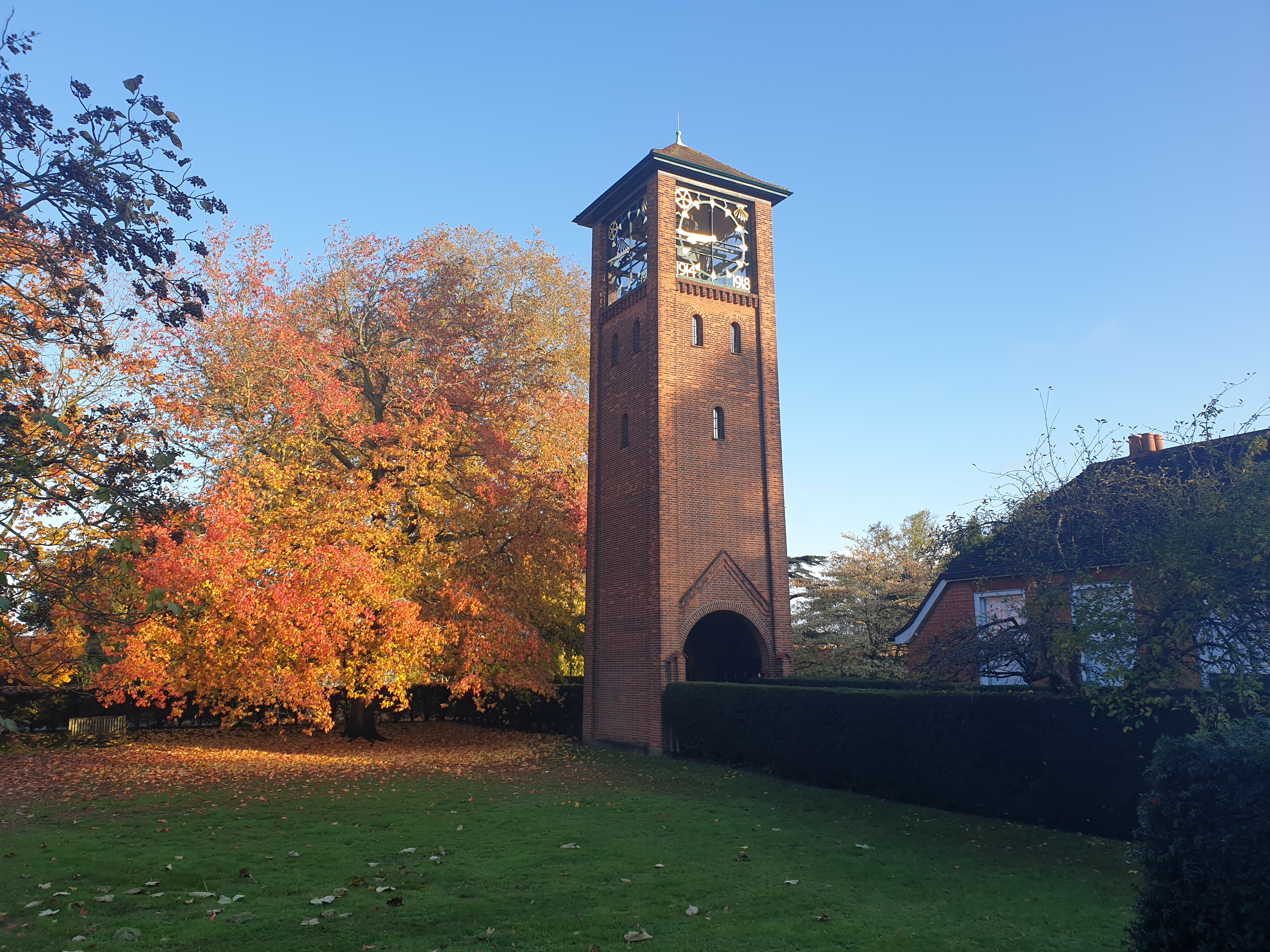
- Clockwise from top left: Museum of English Rural Life in Redlands Road, De Beauvoir Road, University London Road campus and war memorial, Retreat pub on St Johns Street

- Location within Berkshire
- Area: 2.079 km^{2} (0.803 sq mi)
- Population: 15,280
  - Density: 7,350/km^{2} (19,000/sq mi)
- OS grid reference: SU727726
- Unitary authority: Reading
- Ceremonial county: Berkshire
- Region: South East
- Country: England
- Sovereign state: United Kingdom
- Police: Thames Valley
- Fire: Royal Berkshire
- Ambulance: South Central
- UK Parliament: Reading Central Earley and Woodley

Redlands is an electoral ward of the Borough of Reading, in the English county of Berkshire. It takes its name from Redlands Road, which runs north to south through the ward.

== Location ==
Redlands ward lies in the neighbourhoods of East Reading and, to a lesser extent, Whitley, in the south-east of the Borough of Reading. The ward includes about a third of the University of Reading's Whiteknight Campus, as well as the whole of its London Road Campus and several off-campus student halls of residence.

From the north in clockwise order it is bounded by the Kings Road, Cemetery Junction and Eastern Avenue, the boundary then crosses Whiteknights Campus to Shinfield Road. It then follows Shinfield Road, Christchurch Green and Northcourt Avenue, before cutting behind houses in Whitley to Northumberland Avenue. It then follows Northumberland Avenue, Vicarage Road, Christchurch Road, Kendrick Road, Crown Place, Sidmouth Street and Queens Road back to Kings Road.

The ward shares borders with Thames, Park, Church, Katesgrove and Abbey wards of the Borough of Reading, and with the civil parish of Earley in the Borough of Wokingham. It is mostly within the parliamentary constituency of Reading Central, but a smaller part in the south-east of the ward is in Earley and Woodley.

== Profile ==
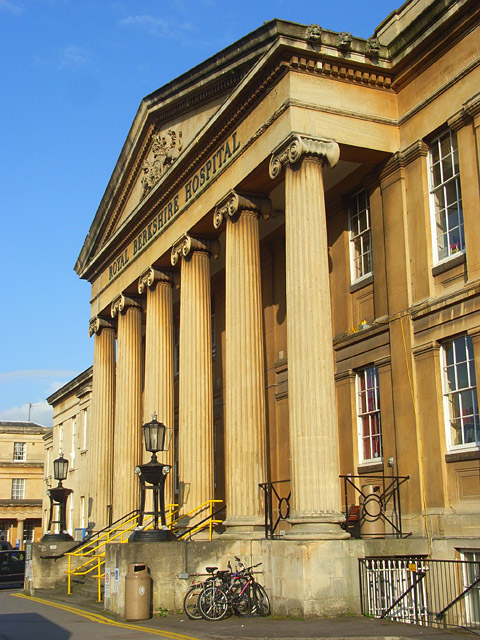
Original building of the Royal Berkshire Hospital

=== Demographics ===
Redlands ward is heavily influenced by the large number of University of Reading students who live in it. As of 2024, the ward had an area of 2.079 square kilometres (0.803 sq mi) and there were 15,280 people living there. Of these, 10.9% were under 15 and 6.3% were 65 and over; 66.0% classified themselves as White, 18.6% as Asian, and 7.2% as Black, Caribbean or African; 35.7% were born outside the UK.

The population lived in 4,594 households, of which 45.2% were in a flat, maisonette or apartment, and 54.2% were in a house or bungalow. Of the households, 16.5% were owned outright by the residents, 18.3% were owned subject to a mortgage, loan or shared ownership, 52.1% were privately rented and 13.1% were socially rented.

Of the population aged over 16, 47.8% were in employment, 5.3% were unemployed, and 46.8% were economically inactive. Of those in employment, 53.2% were in managerial, professional or technical occupations. A total of 39.0% of the population were educated to university degree level.

=== Environment ===
As of 2022, Redlands ward had a tree canopy cover of 19.0%, compared to figures of 17.7% for the Reading as a whole, and 16.5% for the United Kingdom. Significant open spaces include Whiteknights Park, Eldon Square and Cintra Park.

=== Facilities ===
In addition to the university, the ward also includes Reading School, the Abbey School, St Joseph's College and Redlands Primary School. The town's principal hospital, the Royal Berkshire Hospital, is in the ward, as is the Museum of English Rural Life.

== Representation ==
As with all Reading wards, the ward elects three councillors to Reading Borough Council. Elections since 2004 are generally held by thirds, with elections in three years out of four. Between 2010 and 2018 a Labour party candidate won every election. Since then, the Green party have won six of the eight vacancies, with Labour winning two. The ward councillors are currently Kathryn McCann and David McElroy, both of whom are members of the Green party, and Will Cross, a member of the Labour party.
