= Park (Reading ward) =

Electoral ward of Reading, Berkshire

Coordinates: 51.450795°N 0.940067°W

Park Ward, Borough of Reading
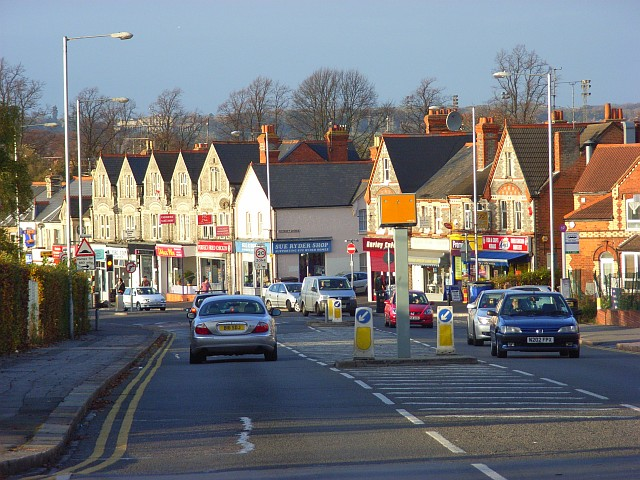
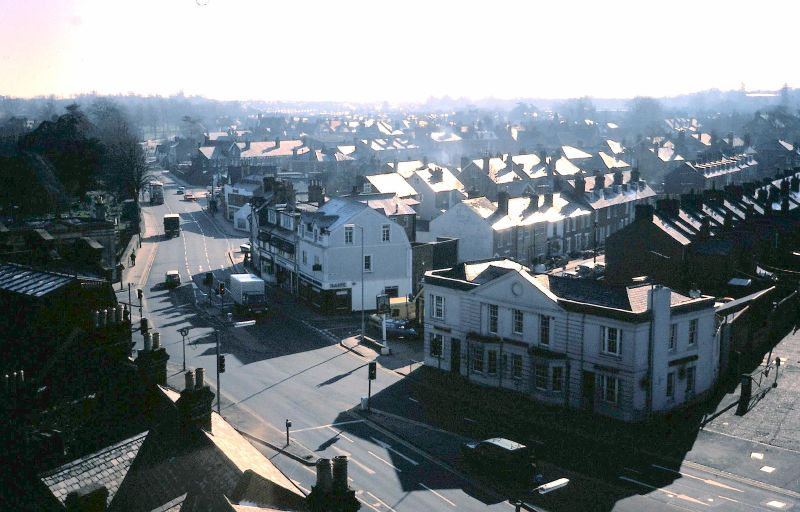
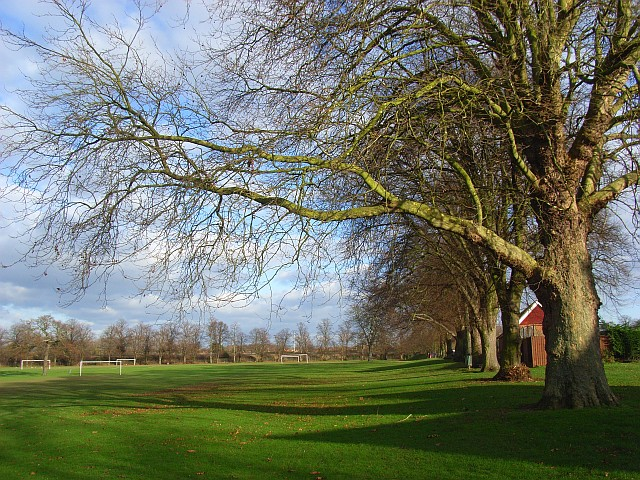
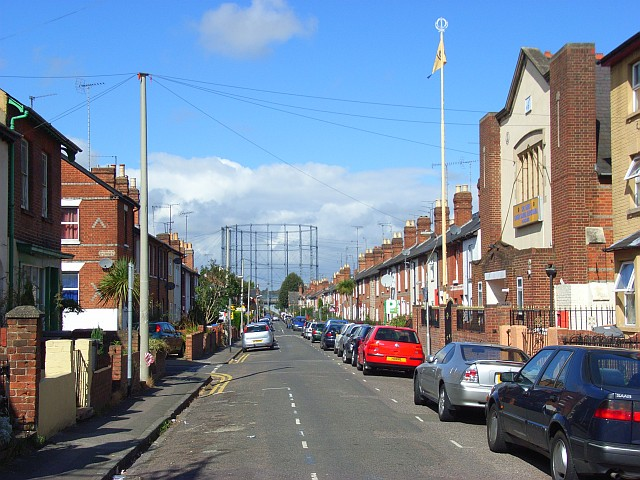
- Clockwise from top left: Wokingham Road shops, Park Ward in 1976, Cumberland Road, Palmer Park

- Location within Berkshire
- Area: 1.332 km^{2} (0.514 sq mi)
- Population: 12,156
  - Density: 9,126/km^{2} (23,640/sq mi)
- OS grid reference: SU736730
- Unitary authority: Reading
- Ceremonial county: Berkshire
- Region: South East
- Country: England
- Sovereign state: United Kingdom
- Police: Thames Valley
- Fire: Royal Berkshire
- Ambulance: South Central
- UK Parliament: Reading Central

Park is an electoral ward of the Borough of Reading, in the English county of Berkshire. The ward includes Palmer Park, from which it takes its name and which includes the Palmer Park library, stadium and sports center.

== Location ==
Park ward lies in East Reading and Newtown neighbourhoods, in the east of the Borough of Reading. From the north in clockwise order it is bounded by the Reading to Waterloo railway line, Church Road, Whiteknights Road, Eastern Avenue, Cemetery Junction, Kings Road, Rupert Street, and the River Kennet. Along the Whitekights Road section of the boundary, the ward is adjacent to the Whiteknights Campus of the University of Reading.

The ward shares borders with Thames and Redlands wards of the Borough of Reading, and with the civil parish of Earley in the Borough of Wokingham. It is entirely within the Reading Central parliamentary constituency.

== Profile ==
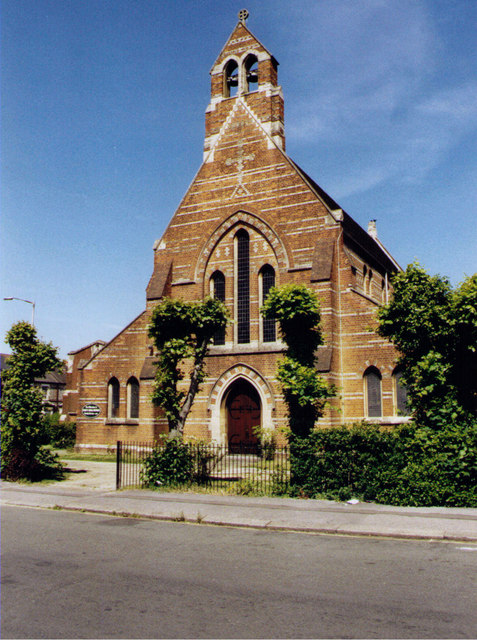
St Bartholomew's Church

=== Demographics ===
Park ward is heavily influenced by the large number of University of Reading students who live in it. As of 2024, the ward had an area of 1.332 square kilometres (0.514 sq mi) and there were 12,156 people living there. Of these, 17.0% were under 15 and 9.7% were 65 and over; 53.6% classified themselves as White, 30.8% as Asian, and 6.6% as Black, Caribbean or African; 42.8% were born outside the UK.

The population lived in 3,821 households, of which 21.6% were in a flat, maisonette or apartment, and 78.4% were in a house or bungalow. Of the households, 21.3% were owned outright by the residents, 27.6% were owned subject to a mortgage, loan or shared ownership, 45.2% were privately rented and 5.9% were socially rented.

Of the population aged over 16, 59.9% were in employment, 4.7% were unemployed, and 35.4% were economically inactive. Of those in employment, 45.9% were in managerial, professional or technical occupations. A total of 41.4% of the population were educated to university degree level.

=== Environment ===
As of 2022, Park ward had a tree canopy cover of 14.9%, compared to figures of 17.7% for the Reading as a whole, and 16.5% for the United Kingdom. The principal open spaces in the ward are Palmer Park and Reading Old Cemetery.

=== Facilities ===
The ward includes Alfred Sutton and New Town primary schools, together with Maiden Erlegh School in Reading and UTC Reading secondary schools, and Hamilton School. St Bartholomew's Church is in the ward.

== Representation ==
As with all Reading wards, the ward elects three councillors to Reading Borough Council. Elections are generally held by thirds, with elections in three years out of four. In the 1984 elections, the ward elected Martin Salter, who would go on to be the Labour MP for Reading West between 1997 and 2010. In the 2001 elections, the ward elected John Howarth, who would go on to be the Labour MEP for South East England between 2017 and 2020.

From 1984 until 2011 Labour won every election in the ward bar one, but from the 2011 election onwards, the Green Party candidates have won. The ward councillors are currently Brenda McGonigle, Rob White and Josh Williams, all of whom are members of the Green Party.
