= Cemetery Junction =

Cemetery Junction may refer to:

- Cemetery Junction, Bournemouth, a road junction in Bournemouth, Dorset, England
- Cemetery Junction, Reading, a road junction in Reading, Berkshire, England
- Cemetery Junction (film), written and directed by Ricky Gervais and Stephen Merchant, set in the Reading area
