= John Player clockmakers =

British clockmakers

- Named after: John Byard Player
- Successor: John Player Junior
- Founded at: 28 Broad Street, Reading
- Location: Reading, Berkshire, England
- Products: Watches and clocks
- Owner: John Byard Player

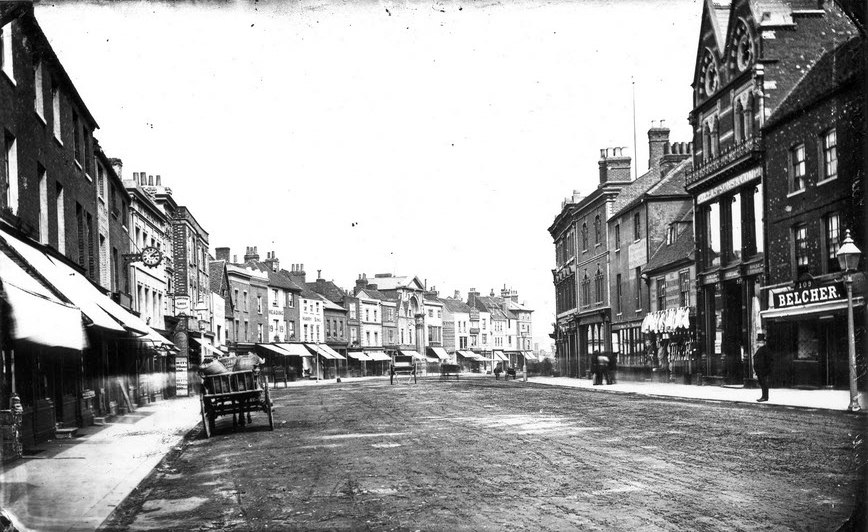
Broad Street, Reading, looking eastwards, c. 1870. North side: No. 28 (John Player, watch maker, with a clock on a bracket outside the shop);

John Player clockmakers was a watch and clockmaking business based in Reading in the 19th century. The business was founded by John Byard Player (May 1792 – 11 June 1861) and was maintained on his retirement by his son John Player Junior. By 1846 John Byard Player had established his business in the centre of the town, making and selling timepieces from his premises at 28 Broad Street, Reading. He was a pacifist, a follower of John Wycliffe and a prominent Reading businessman.

== Craftsmanship ==
A grandfather clock manufactured by Player was donated to the Museum of English Rural Life in Reading. The grandfather clock has a thirty-hour mechanism, strikes the hour and has an oak parquetry case with an enameled clock face which is decorated with flowers in the corners and an exotic bird below the XII.

== Petition sent to Parliament ==
Player was one of the signatories to an anti-war petition presented to the British Parliament by the leading Liberal and reformist Member of Parliament John Bright on 2 March 1846. Amongst other signatories were Thomas Huntley and George Palmer, well known entrepreneurs who had set up the Huntley & Palmers biscuit-manufacturing company. The petition lamented "slaughter in remote parts of India…". The petition caused much consternation within government circles with the Prime Minister Sir Robert Peel reported as stating that he "could hardly have believed it possible that in this country any body of men could be found ready to sign a petition such as one referred to." This petition referred to the First Anglo Sikh War, 1845 to 1846, which resulted in the partial subjugation of the Sikh Kingdom and annexation of Jammu and Kashmir.

== Retirement of John Byard Player ==
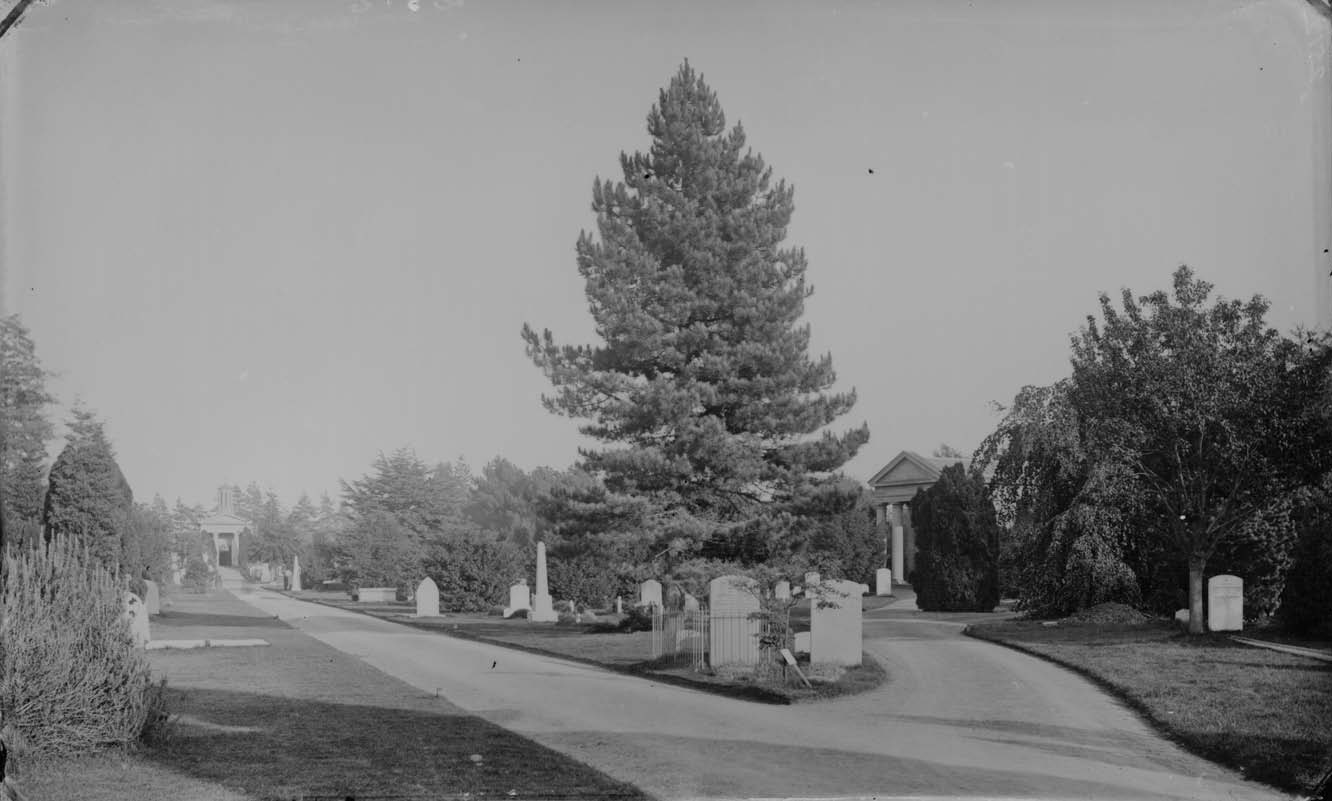
Reading Old Cemetery, London Road, c. 1875

John Byard Player continued to manufacture watches and clocks at Broad Street but on retirement, he left the business to a son, also named John, and went to live with another son Horatio until his death. John Byard Player died on 11 June 1861, and was buried at Reading Old Cemetery, London Road.

== John Player Junior ==
John Player Junior (1818–1897) began his business as a clock and watchmaker, silversmith, jeweller and engraver in Wallingford on 21 November 1840. He offered a wide range of items for sale including "clocks and watches on every description, jewellery mourning rings, plate and thermometers." On the retirement of his father, John Player Junior ran his father's business at Broad Street until at least 1871. He ceased trading during the 1870s and retired to live with his son at Greenwich, London. He and his brother were due to receive a considerable lump sum when in 1872 the Bank of England paid a dividend of £2000 for £3 percent annuities unclaimed since their father's death in 1861. Like his father he was eventually buried at Reading Old Cemetery, London Road, in January 1897.
