= Mary Smart =

First Sierra Leonean to reside in Reading, England

Mary Smart (1832-1849), occasionally recorded as Mary Stewart, is the earliest known Colony of Sierra Leone resident in the English town of Reading.

== Personal life ==
Born in Sierra Leone in 1832, Smart is almost certainly the daughter of John Smart, birth name Okoroafor, a Nigerian nobleman and member of the ruling family of the Imo State in eastern Nigeria. In 1816, he was captured by slave traders but subsequently rescued by a British frigate and released in Freetown, Sierra Leone. Okoroafor took his name from two key influences; Samuel Smart, Governor of Sierra Leone in 1826 and 1828, the other, John Weeks, a missionary from Devon who had converted him to Christianity, respecting Weeks so much that he named his daughters after Week's sisters. Little is known about Mary Smart's mother.

In 1848, Smart was one of the two girls sent from Sierra Leone to Reading to be trained as a teacher. Smart died less than a year after her arrival from erysipelas in 1849, aged 17, and was buried on the 13 March in an unmarked grave at Reading Old Cemetery. Smart was one of the first people to be buried at the cemetery which opened in 1843 and was described as 'a pious African girl'. Deaths such as these were not uncommon in Victorian Reading which was subjected to poor hygiene and poverty.

== Legacy ==
Smart's life and death in Reading has been mentioned in numerous online articles and other references relating to Reading's links with slavery. In 2007, the exhibition from Reading International Solidarity Centre (RISC), in collaboration with local communities, researched and presented Reading's links with the slave trade, the campaign for its abolition, and its subsequent events, and was funded by the Heritage Lottery Fund. Mary Smart and Okoroafor's histories are both discussed in this. In 2021, BerkshireLive posted an online article titled 'The truth about the history of Reading's black community and the town's links to slavery' which discussed both Mary and Okoroafor, citing that their experiences, alongside other histories relating to slavery in Reading, have been 'airbrushed out'. Richard Stowell's article for Reading History details the links between Reading and Sierra Leone, discussing how Mary Smart and her family history 'illustrates all too well the close connection developed between Britain and Sierra Leone.'

A brief biography has been written about Smart by Richard Stowell titled 'From Regent to Reading: the story of Mary Smart 1832-1849', published in 2012 and currently resides in the University of Reading library.
