= Reading War Hospital =

Reading War Hospital could refer to one of a number of war hospitals created during the first world war in the English town of Reading, including:

- Reading War Hospital No.1, in the building that would eventually become the town's Battle Hospital
- Reading War Hospital No.4, located in the town's Redlands Primary School
