= 1928 Isle of Man TT =

Motorcycle race

In the 1928 Isle of Man Tourist Trophy the newly developed 'positive-stop' foot gear-change by Velocette gave Alec Bennett his fifth TT Race win in the 1928 Junior, in the time of 3 hours, 50 minutes and 52 seconds, at an average speed of 68.65 mph (110.48 km/h), and setting a lap record at an average speed of 67.19 mph (108.13 km/h), with his teammate Harold Willis coming second.

The 1928 Lightweight TT Race was led from start to finish by Frank Longman on an OK-Supreme motorcycle at an average speed of 62.87 mph (101.18 km/h). In contrast the 1928 Senior TT Race was held in heavy rain and mist. The bad race conditions produced many retirements and a slow average speed. The eventual winner of the 1928 Senior TT Race was Charlie Dodson, riding a Sunbeam motorcycle, in 4 hours, 11 minutes and 40 seconds, at an average speed of 62.98 mph (101.36 km/h).

== Senior TT (500cc) ==
Rank	Rider	Team	Speed	Time
1	(United Kingdom) Charlie Dodson	Sunbeam	62.98 mph	4.11.40.0
2	(United Kingdom) George Rowley	AJS	61.27	4.18.41.0
3	(United Kingdom) Tommy L Hatch	Scott	60.89	4.20.18.0
4	(Republic of Ireland) Henry Tyrell-Smith	Rudge	60.52	4.21.58.0
5	(Republic of Ireland) Stanley Woods	Norton	60.42	4.22.19.0
6	(United Kingdom) Ted Mellors	Norton	59.77	4.25.10.0
7	(Switzerland) Francesco Franconi	Sunbeam	59.61	4.25.53.0
8	(United Kingdom) John Duncan	Raleigh	59.59	4.26.00.0
9	(United Kingdom) Arthur Warwick	P&M	59.15	4.27.58.0
10	(United Kingdom) Bill Quinn	Triumph	59.13	4.28.04.0

== Junior TT (350cc) ==
Rank	Rider	Team	Speed	Time
1	(United Kingdom) Alec Bennett	Velocette	68.65 mph (110.48 km/h)	3.50.52.0
2	(United Kingdom) Harold J Willis	Velocette	67.16	3.56.00.0
3	(United Kingdom) Kenneth Twemlow	DOT	66.67	4.08.57.0
4	(United Kingdom) Syd Crabtree	Excelsior	63.16	4.10.57.0
5	(United Kingdom) Freddie Hicks	Velocette	63.11	4.11.09.0
6	(United Kingdom) George Reynard	Royal Enfield	62.9	4.12.00.0
7	(United Kingdom) Cecil Ashby	Raleigh	62.2	4.15.19.0
8	(United Kingdom) Sidney Jackson	Montgomery	61.8	4.16.13.0
9	(United Kingdom) Bernard Laurence Hieatt	Cotton	61.3	4.18.34.0
10	(United Kingdom) Chris Tattersall	DOT	60.7	4.21.00.0

== Lightweight TT (250cc) ==
Rank	Rider	Team	Speed	Time
1	(United Kingdom) Frank Longman	OK-Supreme	62.9 mph	4.11.59.0
2	(United Kingdom) C S Barrow	Royal Enfield	58.92	4.29.01.0
3	(United Kingdom) Edwin Twemlow	DOT	58.83	4.29.26.0
4	(United Kingdom) George Himing	OK-Supreme	58.4	4.31.30.0
5	(United Kingdom) Cecil Ashby	OK Supreme	57.9	4.33.31.0
6	(United Kingdom) Vic Anstice	OK Supreme	57.7	4.34.31.0
7	(United Kingdom) Sammy Jones	New Imperial	57.1	4.37.38.0
8	(United Kingdom) Jock Porter	New Gerrard	56.8	4.39.15.0
9	(United Kingdom) Sid Gleave	New Imperial	56.4	4.41.17.0
10	(United Kingdom) Gordon Burney	Royal Enfield	55.6	4.45.12.0
