= Reading globe groups =

Reading globe groups are voluntary groups which were set up in the mid-1990s by Reading Borough Council in Reading, Berkshire, England, following the undertaking of the Agenda 21 agreement by central government. GLOBE stands for Go Local On a Better Environment. An umbrella group, The Reading Globe Alliance (TREGA), facilitates exchange of information between the groups.

== Aims ==
The Globe Groups around Reading work on improving their local environment in ways that will benefit the local residents and protect the environment. All residents in the group's area may join the group or provide input.

== List of Reading globe groups ==
- Caversham Globe Group
- Newtown Globe Group
- Oxford Road Community Garden (formerly Battle Globe Group)
- Redlands Globe Group
- Southcote Globe Group
- Tilehurst Globe Group
