= Eldon Square, Reading =

Urban square and public park in the English borough of Reading

Eldon Square
- King George V Memorial Gardens
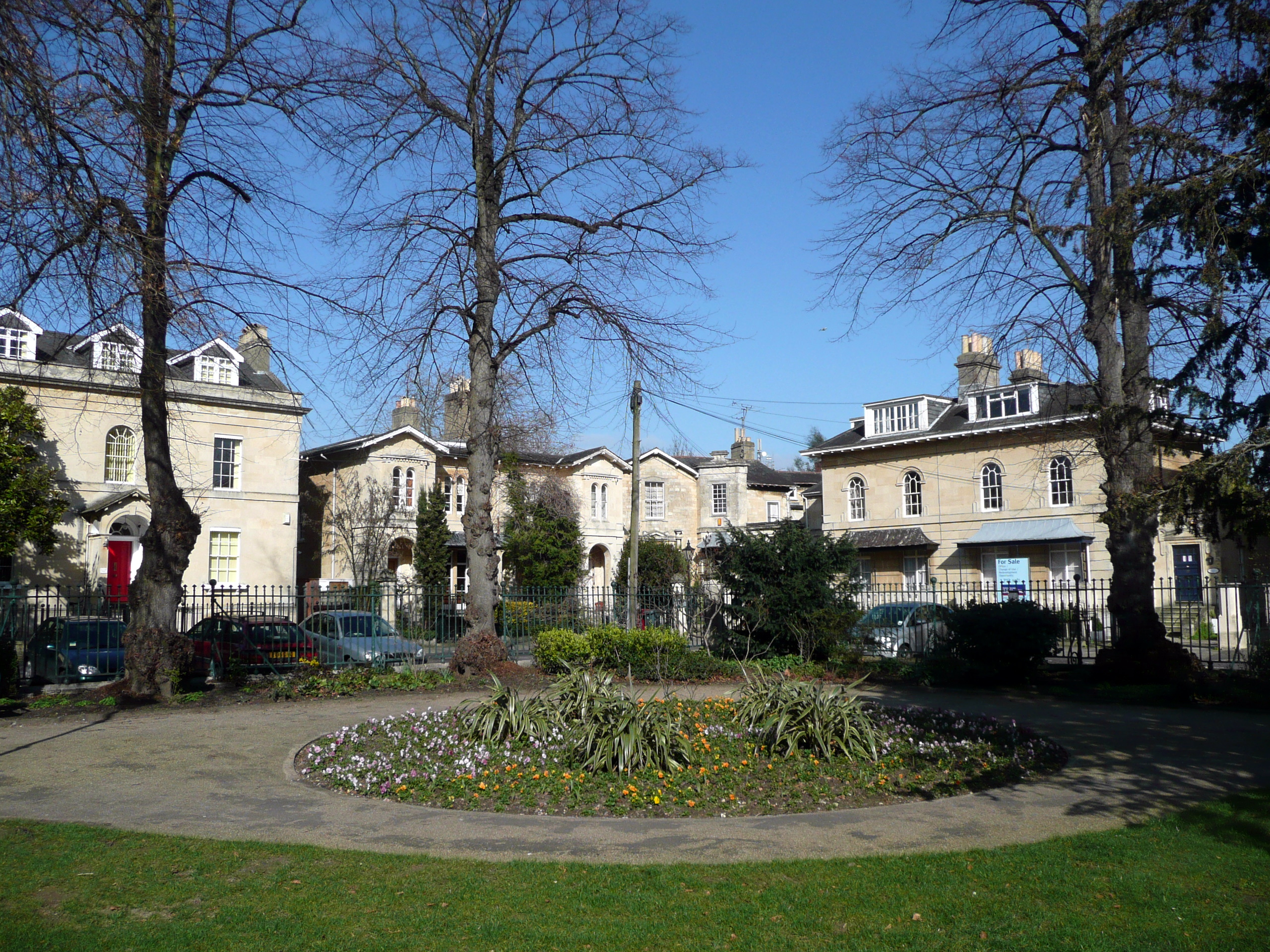
- Eldon Square, with numbers 17 to 27 in the background

- Location within Reading, Berkshire
- Type: Public
- Location: Reading, Berkshire, UK
- Coordinates: 51°27′07″N 0°57′29″W

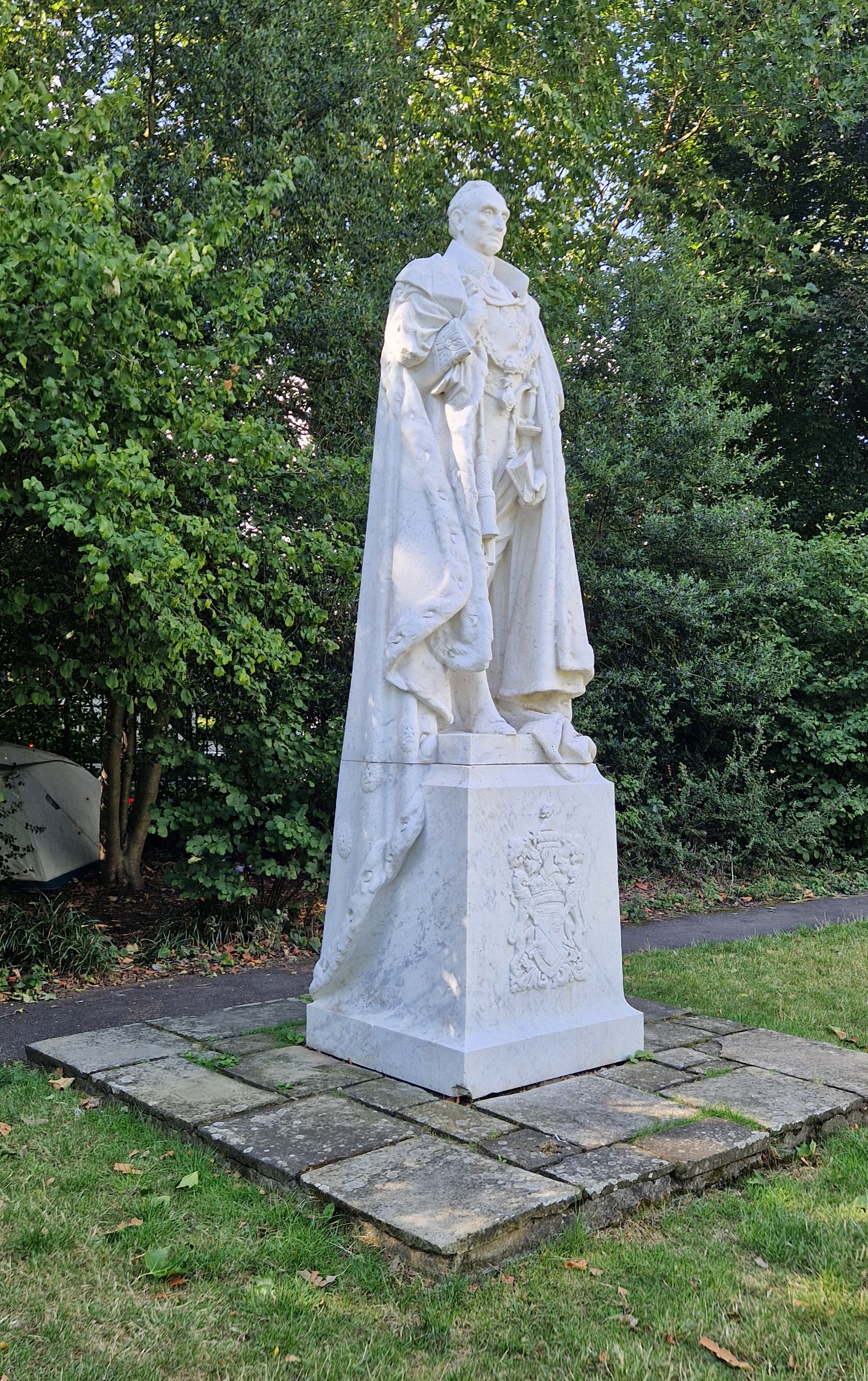
Statue of Rufus Isaacs

Eldon Square is a formally planned garden square located in the East Reading neighbourhood of the English town of Reading. It dates from circa 1840 and comprises a public park surrounded on two sides by residential housing and represents a notable example of 19th-century urban design. The central green space is officially designated the King George V Memorial Gardens, although this name is rarely used in everyday reference.

The square is named after John Scott, 1st Earl of Eldon, who served as Lord Chancellor for much of the early 19th century. Scott spent his later years in nearby Sonning and was a benefactor of the Royal Berkshire Hospital, situated only a short distance from the square. Another Eldon Square exists in Newcastle upon Tyne, the Earl's birthplace.

The houses on the north and east sides of the square bear Eldon Square addresses, while the west and south sides are defined by Eldon Road and London Road, respectively. The square was developed as a prestigious residential area, and the buildings were constructed from Bath stone, which was transported via the Kennet and Avon Canal. Local brothers and architects Henry and Nathaniel Briant reportedly contributed to designing the houses, which were especially popular with medical professionals affiliated with the nearby Royal Berkshire Hospital. All the remaining original houses, numbered 5 to 27, are designated as grade II listed buildings.

Originally intended for the exclusive use of the square’s residents, the central gardens were transferred to Reading Borough Council in 1944 and opened as a public park. They were named the King George V Memorial Gardens in honour of the late monarch, who died in 1936. The gardens feature a central lawn surrounded by ornamental flowerbeds and shrubs. Notable mature trees include red oak, yew, cherry, and cedar. The space is enclosed by grade II listed iron railings.

The gardens are also home to a statue commemorating Rufus Isaacs, 1st Marquess of Reading, who served in several high-profile roles during the early 20th century, including Member of Parliament for Reading, Attorney General, Lord Chief Justice, and Viceroy of India. The statue, sculpted by Charles Sargeant Jagger, was originally located in New Delhi. Following India’s independence in 1947, the statue was offered to the town of Reading and was installed in Eldon Square in 1971.

== See also ==
- List of parks and open spaces in Reading, Berkshire
