= Bernard Laurence Hieatt =

English motorcycle racer

- Nationality: English
- Born: 1909; Reading
- Died: 3 May 1930 (aged 21); Brooklands, Surrey

Bernard Laurence Hieatt (1909 – 3 May 1930) was an English air pilot who became famous for his exploits in motorcycle racing, where he achieved several world records in the sport. His memorial in Reading Old Cemetery which is Grade II listed.

== Life and career ==
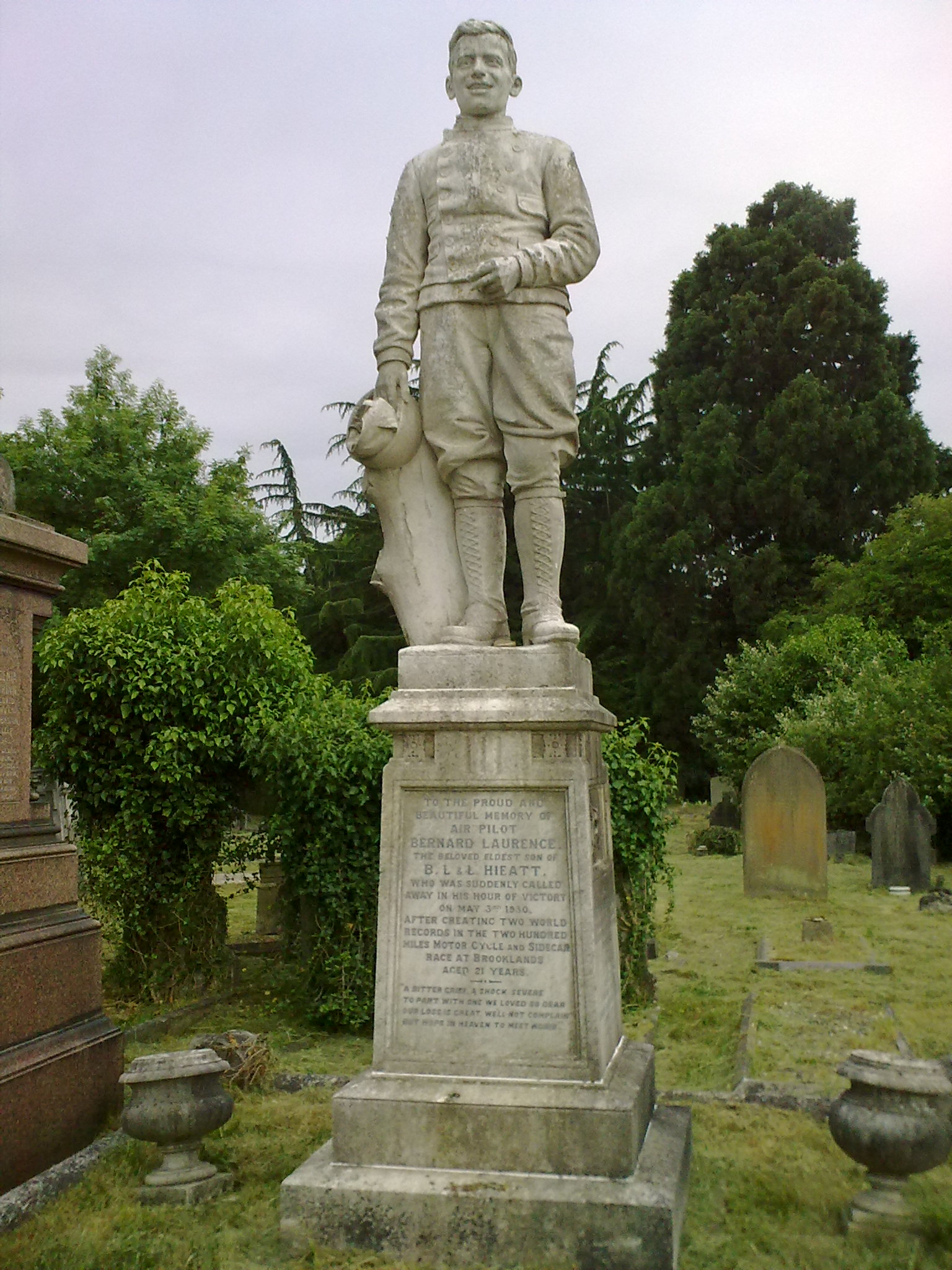
Bernard Laurence Hieatt memorial

Born in Reading, Berkshire, Hieatt, was the eldest son of a Reading butcher, Benoni (Noni) Hieatt and his wife Lizzie Godfrey.

He was a member of the Reading and District Motorcycling Club, where he was captain. He was also an air pilot and used to rent out a Moth aeroplane to fly to racing venues.

He started in dirt track racing for a while, then went to Brooklands, the famous Surrey racetrack in 1927, to race for various engine manufacturers. Achieving distinction on the road and track, he competed on a Cotton in the 1928 TT Races on the Isle of Man when he finished 9th and in 1929 he started in three races but did not finish in any. He was part of the British Motor Cycle team, touring Europe and Egypt and in 1929 won the ‘Sir Charles Wakefield Cup' at Brooklands.

He took several world records, creating two world records in the two hundred miles motorcycle and side car race and won races at Brooklands. He achieved a coveted BMCRC 'Gold Star' in 1929 for lapping the Brooklands track at over 100 mph.

=== Death ===
On 3 May 1930 at Brooklands, Hieatt had broken the 100 miles record and the 2 hours record, covering 160 miles (260 km). This was achieved despite heavy rain and poor visibility. Hieatt's motorcycle had sufficient fuel for the race, but a leaking tank forced him into the pits 8 laps from the finish. During the refuelling pitstop, Hieatt also swapped his goggles for a new pair, as the ones he was wearing were covered in mud. After rejoining the race, Hieatt was leading by a lap and a half when an official went out on to the track with a large red disc, signalling Hieatt to slow down to 5 miles per hour (8.0 km/h), although it seemed Hieatt did not see him.

With another bike 200 yards (180 m) in front of him, Hieatt attempted an overtake on the inside, but steered too close to the grass verge. The side car wheel struck the grass verge at 83 miles per hour (134 km/h), turning the motorcycle over. F. Mathews, the sidecar passenger, was trapped face downwards, but escaped with severe shock. Hieatt was thrown 10 feet (3.0 m) into the air and hit a concrete post, breaking his leg, shattering his skull and lacerating his brain; he died instantly. Officials and a doctor quickly arrived with an ambulance to the crash site. When Hieatt was found he was not wearing goggles, leading to the assumption that he threw them off while still riding.

Hieatt's death was the first motorcycling fatality at Brooklands since the First World War. Death by misadventure was the verdict of the inquest, while an official described Bernard as, "one of the finest riders on the track and in every respect an all round man".

== Legacy ==
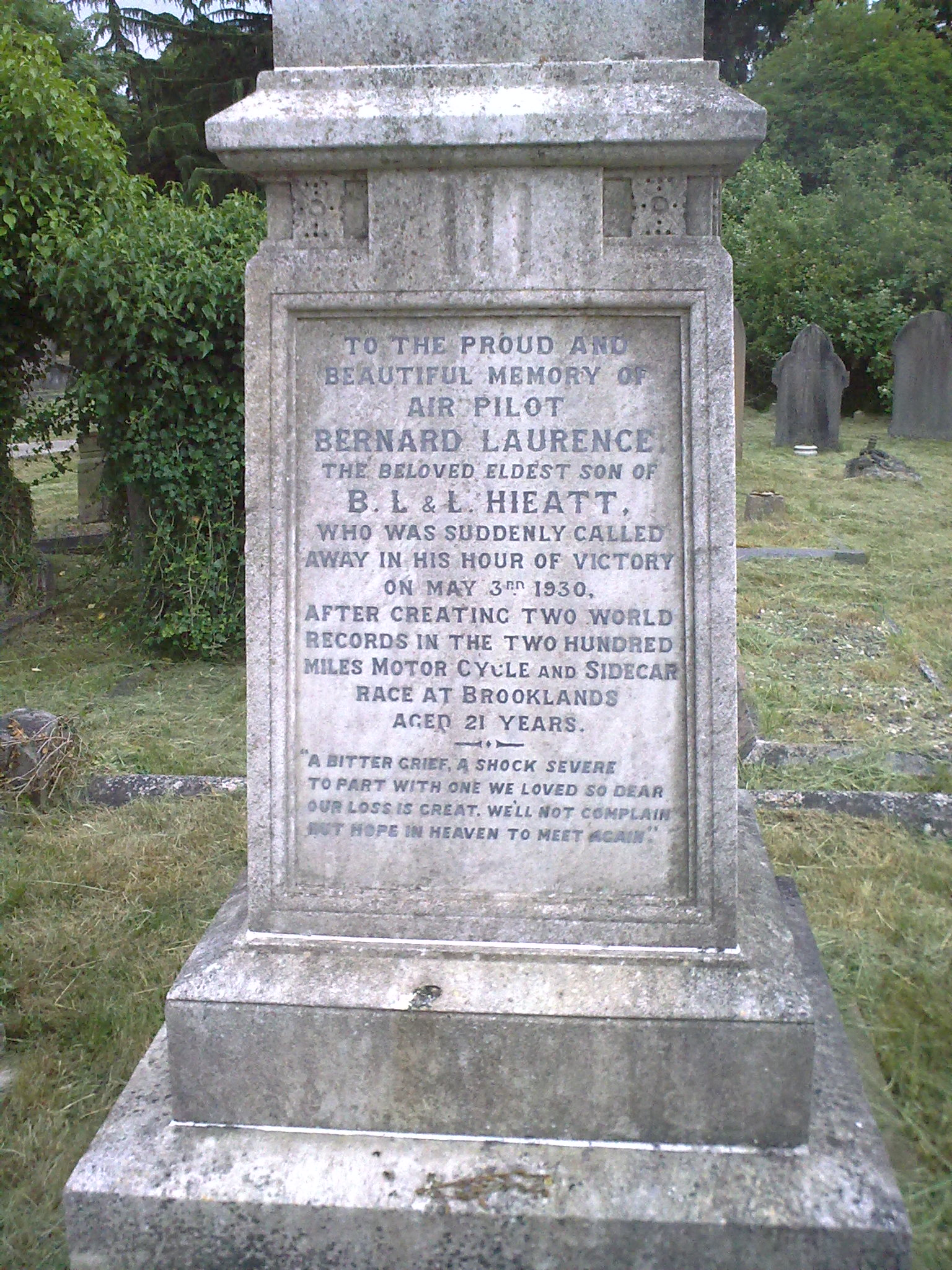
Memorial inscription

Bernard Laurence Hieatt's grave, in the Old Cemetery of the English town of Reading, is a Grade II listed memorial, with a statue of him in full racing gear. On the memorial it reads,

To the proud and beautiful memory of Air Pilot Bernard Laurence, the beloved eldest son of B. L. & L. Hieatt, who was suddenly called away in his hour of victory on May 3rd 1930, after creating two world records in the two hundred miles motor cycle and sidecar race at Brooklands, aged 21 years

It is believed that the statue is the UK's oldest statue of a sportsperson.

A development of flats on Silver Street, Reading has also been named Hieatt Close in his honour.
