= Cintra Park, Reading =

Public park in Reading, England

Cintra Park
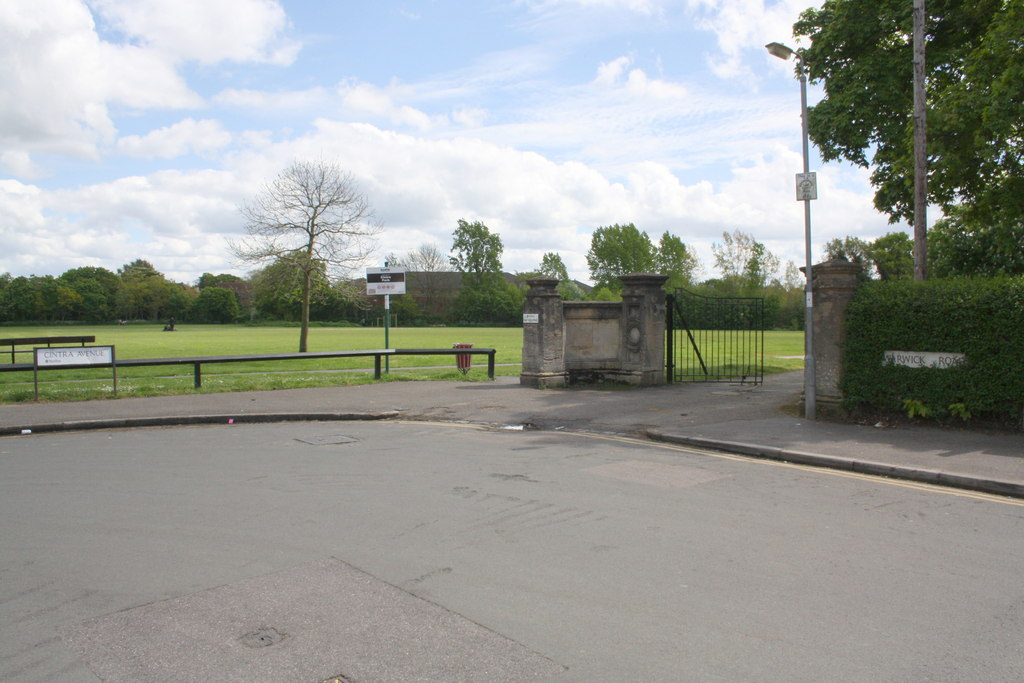
- Entrance to Cintra Park from Cintra Avenue

- Location within Reading, Berkshire
- Interactive map of Cintra Park
- Type: Public park
- Location: East Reading, Reading, UK
- Coordinates: 51°26′30″N 0°57′31″W

Cintra Park is a public park on the border of the Katesgrove, East Reading and Whitley neighbourhoods of the town of Reading in the English county of Berkshire. The park consists of flat open land which has recreational facilities and is located off Christchurch Road. There are panoramic views to the south over Whitley, best viewed in winter.

The park has a children's play area, a picnic area, a hard-surfaced pitch and outdoor gym equipment. It has facilities for bowls, cricket, football and basketball. It is accessible from Cintra Avenue and Northumberland Avenue.

The site of Cintra Park was originally the sports ground of Suttons Seeds, who were based in Reading until 1976. The name is thought to be derived from the town of Sintra in Portugal.

== See also ==
- List of parks and open spaces in Reading, Berkshire
