= Cemetery Junction (film) =

- Cinematic release poster
- Directed by: Ricky Gervais; Stephen Merchant
- Written by: Ricky Gervais; Stephen Merchant
- Produced by: Sue Baden-Powell; Charlie Hanson
- Starring: Christian Cooke; Felicity Jones; Tom Hughes; Jack Doolan; Emily Watson; Ricky Gervais; Matthew Goode; Ralph Fiennes
- Cinematography: Remi Adefarasin
- Edited by: Valerio Bonelli
- Music by: Tim Atack
- Production companies: Columbia Pictures; Gervais/Merchant Productions
- Distributed by: Sony Pictures Releasing
- Release date: 14 April 2010
- Running time: 95 minutes
- Country: United Kingdom
- Language: English
- Box office: $2.3 million

Cemetery Junction is a 2010 British coming-of-age comedy-drama film written and directed by Ricky Gervais and Stephen Merchant. The film was released in the United Kingdom on 14 April 2010.

== Plot ==
In early 1970s England, three friends spend their days in banter, drinking, fighting, and chasing girls. Freddie wants to escape their working class world but cheeky chappy Bruce and kind-hearted slacker Snork are happy with life the way it is. When Freddie gets a job as a door-to-door insurance salesman and bumps into his old school sweetheart Julie, the gang is forced to make choices that will change their lives forever.

Freddie's boss is Julie's father. Selling life insurance in the hopes of improving his life and not ending up like his factory worker father, Freddie learns from the firm's top seller Mike Ramsay, who is also Julie's fiancé, how to scare people into buying insurance. Bruce lives life to the full, with the notion that one day he will leave Cemetery Junction, but he hates his father for letting his mother leave for another man without fighting for her. Snork just lives for spending his time with Bruce and Freddie, working at the railway station and looking for a girlfriend, a search hindered by his lack of social skills. Freddie rekindles his friendship with Julie, who reveals her dreams to see the world and become a photographer, but her father and fiancé Mike both expect her to become a housewife, like her mother.

Freddie is invited to his firm's winner's ball to celebrate his and several others' company initiation and brings Bruce and Snork as his guests. At night, Snork tires of the band and claims he could do better. Bruce convinces them to let Snork perform with them. The crowd initially enjoys his performance, but he gets carried away and tells a highly inappropriate joke, embarrassing Freddie. He confronts and scolds Snork and Bruce, but Bruce shrugs it off, still claiming he will leave the town, and that Freddie will never be like his colleagues because he's 'not a cunt', which the crowd overhears, forcing them to leave.

The next day, Freddie goes around town thanking his clients for helping him start his new career and learns that his very first client's husband has died. Deciding not to live off people's misery, he asks Bruce when they plan to leave. They invite Julie to a nightclub and convince Snork to leave with them. In the club, Bruce starts dancing with a black woman, for which he is ridiculed by two men, provoking him to assault them and get locked up in the police cells overnight.

Freddie accompanies Julie home, and they develop the pictures Julie had taken throughout the night. They argue about their feelings, the lives of her parents, and Julie's engagement to Mike, which is following the same path as her parents'. Freddie declares his love for Julie and asks her to go traveling, but she refuses and tells him to leave. Bruce is met in his cell by Officer Wayne Davies, an old friend of his father's and the one man Bruce respects, who is fed up with Bruce taking his anger with his father out on others. He tells Bruce the story of the night his mother left, revealing that she happily abandoned him but his father wanted him and tells him to grow up and get over his anti-social behaviour.

The following morning, Snork goes to a café he frequents and talks to Louise, a girl who works there who likes him and they form a relationship. Bruce walks home and silently makes amends with his father. When Freddie arrives at the railway station to begin his travels, he finds Snork ready for work, having decided to stay and they say an emotional goodbye. Julie realises that Freddie was right, that her relationship with Mike will stifle her, and goes to the railway station. Snork announces over the station PA that Bruce will not be joining Freddie on his journey. Deciding not to go alone, Freddie is on the point of abandoning his adventure when he sees Julie running towards him and they board the train.

== Cast ==
- Christian Cooke as Freddie Taylor
- Felicity Jones as Julie
- Tom Hughes as Bruce Pearson
- Jack Doolan as Paul/Snork
- Anne Reid as Freddie's Gran
- Steve Speirs as Sgt Wyn Davies
- Julia Davis as Mrs Taylor
- Emily Watson as Mrs Kendrick
- Ben Willbond as Martin
- Ricky Gervais as Len Taylor
- Matthew Goode as Mike Ramsay
- Ralph Fiennes as Mr Kendrick
- Albert Welling as Mr Waring
- Katy Murphy as Mrs Waring
- Burn Gorman as Renwick
- Matthew Holness as Bandleader
- Kirk Yeomans as Voice of bandleader
- Michael Jibson as Cliff
- Francis Magee as Mr Pearson
- Imdad Miah as Salesman #1
- David Earl as Brian the café owner
- Bryony Hannah as Louise the waitress
- Simone Richards as a Cafe worker
- Stephen Merchant as Dougie
- Stephen Simpson as Musician

== Production ==
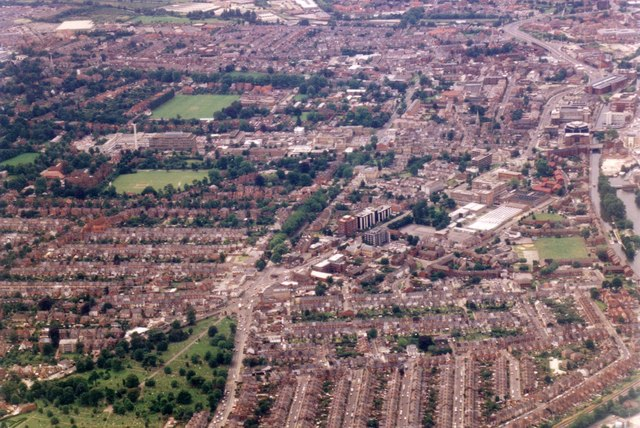
The film uses the backdrop of Reading's Cemetery Junction

The film was originally titled The Men at the Pru, a colloquial term (and later an advertising slogan) for agents of the Prudential insurance company. During the writing of the film, Prudential allowed Gervais and Merchant to use their archives for research. After reading the script, the company decided it was not pleased with how the company was to be portrayed in the film and decided not to allow its name to be used. The new title comes from the name of a junction in the town of Reading where the film takes place.

Principal photography began on 15 June 2009; filming locations included Taylors Bell Foundry and the Great Central Railway using Loughborough Central railway station. The intermittent scenes which show the camera panning around a countryside landscape were filmed in Stroud, Gloucestershire. Several of the street scenes were filmed in Woodstock, Oxfordshire with Woodstock Town Hall being used to portray the exterior of the Cemetery Junction police station. In London, various locations are depicted including Little Common in Stanmore and Church Row and Flask Walk in Hampstead. An extended trailer was broadcast on Channel 4 on 31 January 2010.

Cemetery Junction is set in the town of Reading (at the time, about 80,000 inhabitants) in 1973. Gervais explained that the title of the film was taken from Cemetery Junction, an area of the town that he knew as a child. Gervais also adds "[...] it's not really set in Reading, it's any small town, anywhere in the world to be honest." According to him, it is a "coming of age" story that is a cross between The Office and Mad Men.

=== Writing ===
In an interview with BBC Radio 2's Danny Wallace on 9 January 2010, Merchant stated the script was loosely based upon the lyrics of the Bruce Springsteen song "Thunder Road". This sentiment was repeated by Gervais on 12 April 2010 when he appeared on The Graham Norton Show. Gervais told BBC South Today that British "kitchen sink" films such as Saturday Night and Sunday Morning were an influence on the film.

=== Music ===
Interviewed for The Guardian, Gervais explained his music choices for the film:

Junction is probably the most personal of all my work so far. Sure, I worked in an office for eight years as a middle manager, like that David Brent, then I worked my way up in TV like that Andy Millman, and like most comedians, my stand up is observational. But Cemetery Junction is not only based on my memories of my most formative years but it feeds on the most fundamental things in the making of a man: family, economics, the time and place you happened to be plonked in. Even though the movie is a fiction, the values, themes and characters are based on my memory of growing up in Reading in the early 70s. The soundtrack had to reflect that. It's purely coincidence that the songs in the film happen to be some of my favourites. (Just one of the perks of being a writer/director/producer/failed pop star).

The soundtrack for the film includes:

- "Saturday Night's Alright (For Fighting)", written by Elton John and Bernie Taupin, performed by Elton John
- "Amazona", written by Bryan Ferry/Phil Manzanera, performed by Roxy Music
- "Life's A Gas", written by Marc Bolan, performed by T. Rex
- "All the Young Dudes", words and music by David Bowie, performed by Mott the Hoople, featured vocals by David Bowie
- "The Rain Song", written by Jimmy Page/Robert Plant, performed by Led Zeppelin

== Reception ==
Reviews of the film were generally mixed. The review aggregator Rotten Tomatoes the film holds an approval rating of 56%, based on 41 critical reviews with an average rating of 5.9/10. The website's critics consensus reads: "It fails to challenge the well-established conventions of its storyline, but Cemetery Junction benefits from the genuine warmth of its script, as well as its refusal to give in to cheap nostalgia."

Total Film magazine giving it four out of five stars and calling it "the most confident British debut since Shallow Grave". Time Out magazine gave the film three stars and said it was "refreshing to see a mainstream British film with the ambition to strut its stuff on studio terms". Adam Smith of the Radio Times commented that "it's deftly written, unobtrusively directed and nicely acted" and also gave it three stars. OK! appreciated the "sweet characters and good actors" and also liked "the vintage look of the film" and the "great supporting cast". The Daily Mirror gave the film a very positive review awarding it four stars and saying; "The film is no simple-minded laugh-fest, but rather an astute, amusing and engaging coming-of-age tale with a killer soundtrack of 1970s classics".

Uncut called it a "passable, mildly diverting, coming-of-age Brit-flick". Andrew Barker of Variety wrote, "It's a strange hybrid of a film, boasting loudmouth boorishness instead of wit, and fortune-cookie schmaltz instead of heart." Peter Bradshaw reviewed the film for The Guardian and concluded that the film "is entertaining as far as it goes, but it would have to be fully and Gervaisishly funny, or else fully nasty, vinegary and sad before everyone involved was, to coin a phrase, up the junction."

=== Box office ===
The film's opening weekend receipts were £641,218. By the end of its theatrical run in the UK, the film had taken in £1,329,002. The film grossed $2.32 million worldwide.

=== Accolades ===
Year	Award	Category	Nominee	Result
2010	13th British Independent Film Awards	Most Promising Newcomer	Tom Hughes	Nominated

== Home media ==
Cemetery Junction was released in the UK in both DVD and Blu-ray format on 30 August 2010. The DVD bonus features include a commentary track from Ricky Gervais and Stephen Merchant, deleted scenes and two featurettes including interviews with the cast and crew. The Blu-ray release also includes several additional featurettes.

Columbia Pictures decided not to theatrically release the film in the company's home market. Accordingly, the film was released on DVD in Canada and the US by Sony Pictures Home Entertainment on 17 August 2010.

== See also ==
- 1970s nostalgia
