= Newtown, Reading =

Area of Reading, Berkshire, England

Coordinates: 51.455°N 0.948°W

Newtown
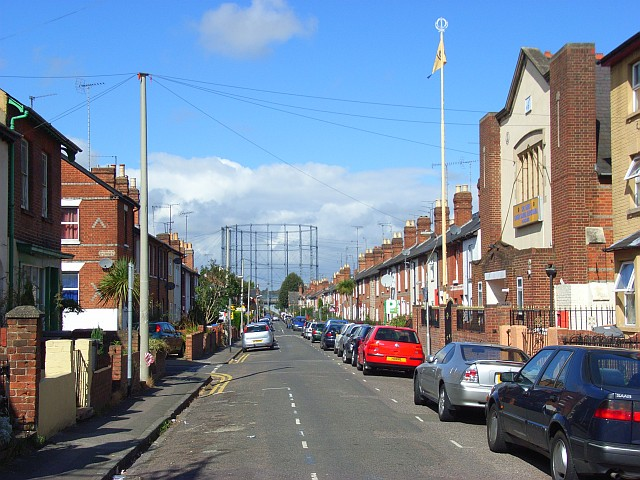
- View north down Cumberland Road

- Location within Berkshire
- OS grid reference: SU731733
- Unitary authority: Reading
- Ceremonial county: Berkshire
- Region: South East
- Country: England
- Sovereign state: United Kingdom
- Post town: Reading
- Postcode district: RG1 3
- Dialling code: 0118
- Police: Thames Valley
- Fire: Royal Berkshire
- Ambulance: South Central
- UK Parliament: Reading Central

Newtown is a residential area in the town of Reading in Berkshire, England. It is situated in East Reading between the Cemetery Junction and the River Kennet. The population is a socially and ethnically diverse mix of families, professionals and Reading University students.

== History ==
In 1822, Joseph Huntley started his first bakery (later to become the Huntley & Palmers biscuit factory) in London street. By 1846 he opened the King's Road Factory, which led to a dramatic increase in the number of employees needed over the following decades. The terraced houses of New Town, Reading were built from the 1870s and its proximity to the factory made it a popular place for the employees to live.

In 1875 George Palmer gave 14 acres of King's Meadows, beside the River Thames and in 1889 an additional 49 acres of land, which is now known as Palmer Park.

== Geography ==
The northern boundary is the River Kennet which becomes the Kennet and Avon Canal. The area around the confluence of the River Kennet and the River Thames is known as Kennetmouth and is a popular area for recreation. One landmark is the historic Horseshoe Bridge which was formerly used by barge horses but is now a footbridge. Newtown Globe Group has adopted a small area of land at Kennetmouth and has erected a seat, an interpretation board and a mosaic depicting the meeting of the rivers. The other, an early Isambard Kingdom Brunel railway bridge.

At its western edge close to the town centre is the Financial Services company The Prudential where the residential options are modern large apartments and The Orts road Council estate. The area is the eastern boundary of Reading Borough Council with Wokingham District Council. Residentially, it is composed, at the eastern end, of terraced houses which were originally built for the employees of Huntley and Palmers and Sutton's Seeds. They feature distinctive polychromatic brickwork with some of the best examples in School Terrace and the Victorian Newtown Primary School.

== Community ==
The area is socially, ethnically and religiously diverse. It is home to St Johns and St Stephen's Church of England and primary school, Wycliffe Baptist church, Sri Guru Singh Sabha Gurdwara and several small Islamic centres. It has an active community both environmentally (being home to Reading's first Green party Councillor and for families with the local children's centre.

== Education ==
Local schools include New Town Primary School and St John's Primary. Both are in the area of Newtown. The closest comprehensive secondary schools are Maiden Erlegh in Reading, Maiden Erlegh in Earley and Bulmershe in Woodley.
