= Reading Fringe Festival =

Reading has had several Fringe Festivals over the years. The first Reading Fringe Festival was started in 2005 in Reading, Berkshire, after a group of several musicians, producers and promoters decided to showcase Reading's musical talent in the week running up to the Reading Festival. The concept was to bring the local promoters and venues together for one week of gigs promoted by the fringe committee. Unfortunately, it ran for a few years and decided to not continue the concept.

In 2012, three Reading enthusiasts, with a background in the arts decided to start up a new Reading Fringe Festival. It was started by Thomas Sellwood, a playwright and director, Gemma Wells, a marketeer and Zsuzsi Lindsay, a producer and project manager. The first Reading Fringe Festival under new manager kicked off in 2013, with nine venues, 20 acts over five days. It is now in its seventh year and works with 18 venues, over 100 events and runs over 10 days.

It has won a number of accolades since starting including, Reading Cultural Contribution Award and the Pride of Reading Awards, the Alt Reading Festival of the Year Nominee, Festival of the Year at the Reading Cultural Awards, and they have also been nominated for the Queen's Service Award.
