= Redlands Primary School, Reading =

Coordinates: 51.4464°N 0.9485°W

Redlands Primary School (Reading)

Location
- Lydford Road; Reading, Berkshire, RG1 5QH; England

Information
- Type: Community school
- Established: 1891
- Local authority: Reading
- Department for Education URN: 109787 Tables
- Ofsted: Reports
- Head teacher: Christian Lim
- Gender: Mixed
- Age: 3 to 11
- Enrolment: 245
- Capacity: 210
- Website: http://www.redlandsschool.co.uk/

Redlands Primary School is a primary school in Reading, Berkshire, England. Located approximately 1 mile (1.6 km) south-east of the centre of Reading, it is located near to the University of Reading's Whiteknights Campus. During the First World War, the school was repurposed as Reading War Hospital No.4.

== History ==
The school was founded in 1891 as Redlands Board School. Initially it consisted of just an Infant Department which catered for children aged 2 to 7, but in 1892 separate Boys and Girls Departments were opened for children aged 7 to 14. The school buildings, which were designed by local architect S. Slingsby Stallwood, were intended to hold 1166 children, and consisted of a small block which housed the Infants and a larger two-storey block which housed the Boys upstairs and the Girls downstairs.

In 1902 the abolition of the school boards led to the school's name being changed to Redlands Council School.

During World War I, between 1915 and 1918, the school buildings were converted to No. 4 Reading War Hospital and the teachers and pupils were temporarily moved out to nearby schools.

In 1929 the three departments of the school were reorganized into just two: a Primary Department for children aged up to 11 and a Secondary Department for older children. In 1945 these two departments were recognized as separate schools: Redlands Primary School and Redlands Secondary School. However, in 1963 the local education authority decided that the Secondary School was too small to support and closed it. The Primary School moved into the larger building in 1968.

In 2023, the school became part of a formal partnership with the nearby Alfred Sutton Primary School that saw a shared executive leadership team created. The school was rated 'Good' by Ofsted in July 2025, and Christian Lim was appointed head teacher in September of that year.
