= East Reading =

Area of Reading, Berkshire, England

Coordinates: 51.453020°N 0.949790°W

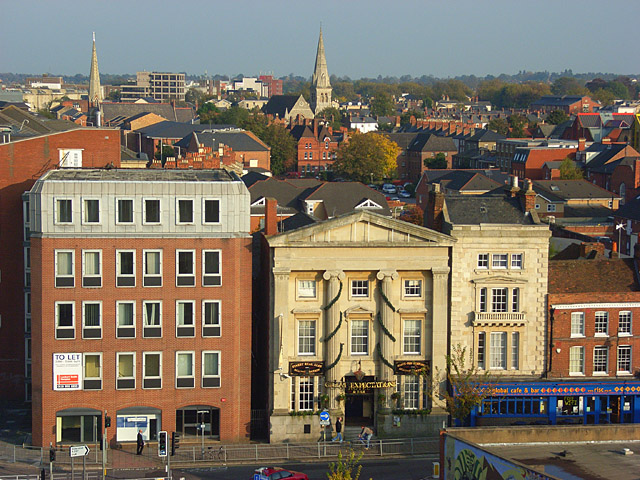
- Elevated view of London Street and further parts of the locality.

- Location within Berkshire
- OS grid reference: SU729732
- Unitary authority: Reading
- Ceremonial county: Berkshire
- Region: South East
- Country: England
- Sovereign state: United Kingdom
- Police: Thames Valley
- Fire: Royal Berkshire
- Ambulance: South Central
- UK Parliament: Reading Central

East Reading is a main locality (or informal subdivision) of the town of Reading in the English county of Berkshire. It is centred around Cemetery Junction, named after Reading Old Cemetery.

== Extent ==
The locality has no formal boundaries; the name is generally used to refer to the area within the borough boundaries to the east of the commercial centre, next to and to the south of the canalised River Kennet, north of Whitley, west of Earley and east of Katesgrove. As such it includes the relatively densely populated area of Newtown, as well as the areas around London Road and Earley Road, Cemetery Junction and Wokingham Road as far as the borough boundary at The Three Tuns.

The locality is in the borough of Reading, including all of Park ward together with parts of Abbey, and Redlands wards. East Reading is currently in the Reading Central parliamentary constituency.

== Education ==
The University of Reading's London Road Campus are narrowly within the locality's western boundary, whilst the university's main Whiteknights Campus is on the southern boundary. Both Reading College and the Thames Valley University are squarely within the informal confines, as is Reading School.

== Architecture ==
The oldest building in the area is Watlington House, whilst the area includes other non-ecclesiastical buildings set among the rarest 0.1% nationally by listing at grade II* or above, such as Royal Berkshire Hospital and Albion Terrace.

== Transport ==
Reading Buses operate frequent bus services along the London Road which transforms to Wokingham Road, including to the Royal Berkshire Hospital.

=== East Reading MRT ===
East Reading Mass Rapid Transit (MRT) is a proposed elevated bus, cycle and pedestrian route. If built, it will link a new park and ride site at Thames Valley Park, in Wokingham District, to Napier Road in Reading. There has been much local opposition to the plan and planning permission for it was refused by Wokingham District Council for a second time on 12 December 2018.
