= Cemetery Junction, Reading =

Road junction in England

Cemetery Junction
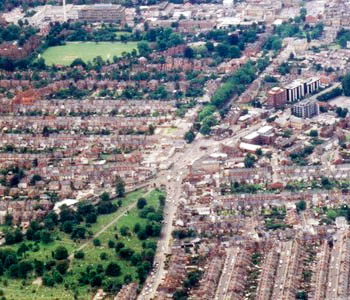
- Aerial view of Cemetery Junction in 1986
- Interactive map of Cemetery Junction

Location
- Reading, Berkshire, UK
- Coordinates: 51°27′10″N 0°56′55″W
- Roads at junction: A4 London Road; A329 Wokingham Road; A329 Kings Road

Construction
- Type: Intersection

Cemetery Junction is a road junction and locale in the East Reading and Newtown neighbourhoods of the town of Reading in the English county of Berkshire. It is a notorious bottleneck for traffic during rush hour, with the main A4 road meeting the A329 road from Wokingham.

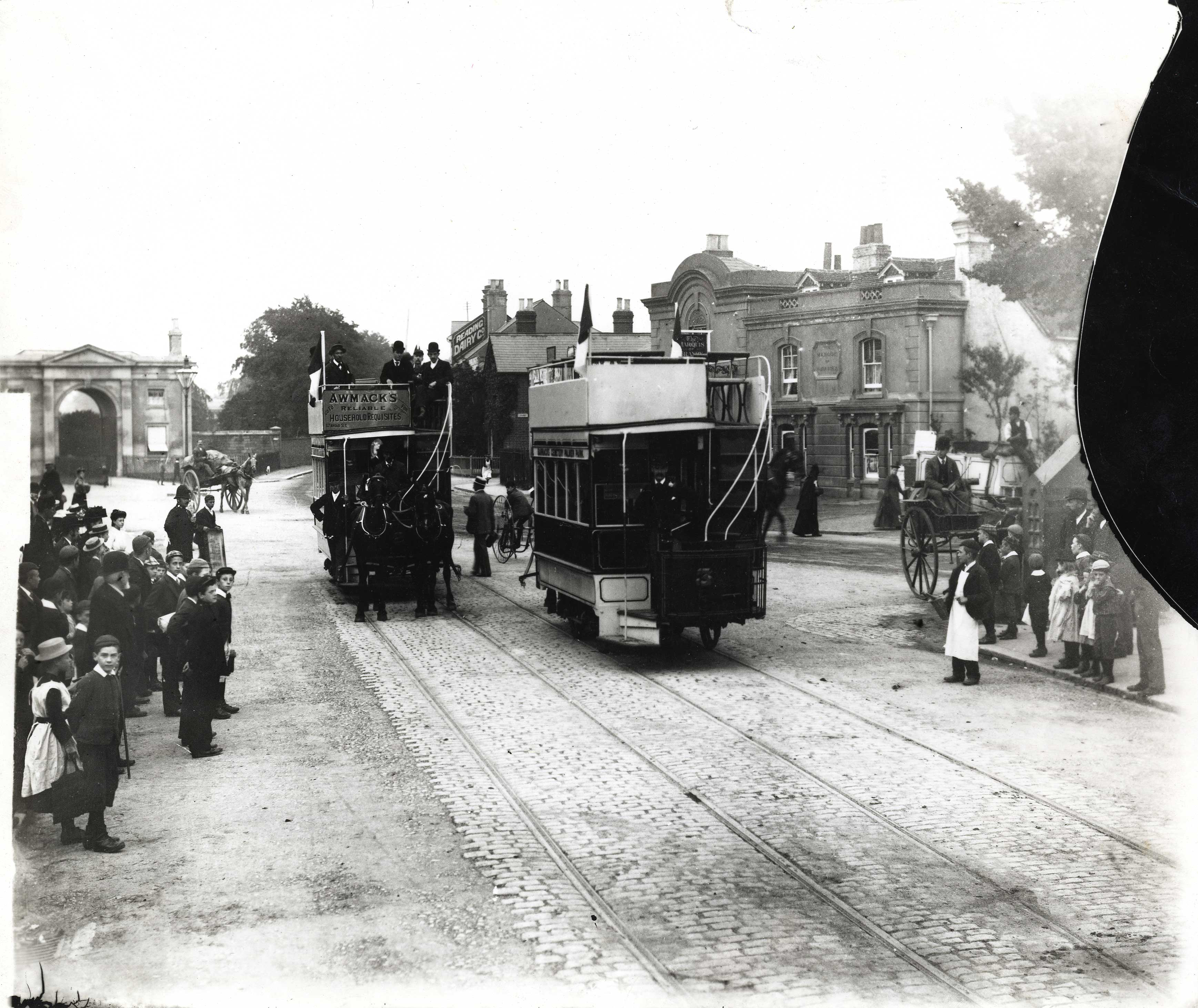
Cemetery Junction in 1893

The junction takes its name from the Reading Old Cemetery, just to the east, which is accessed through an ornamental gatehouse at the apex of the junction.

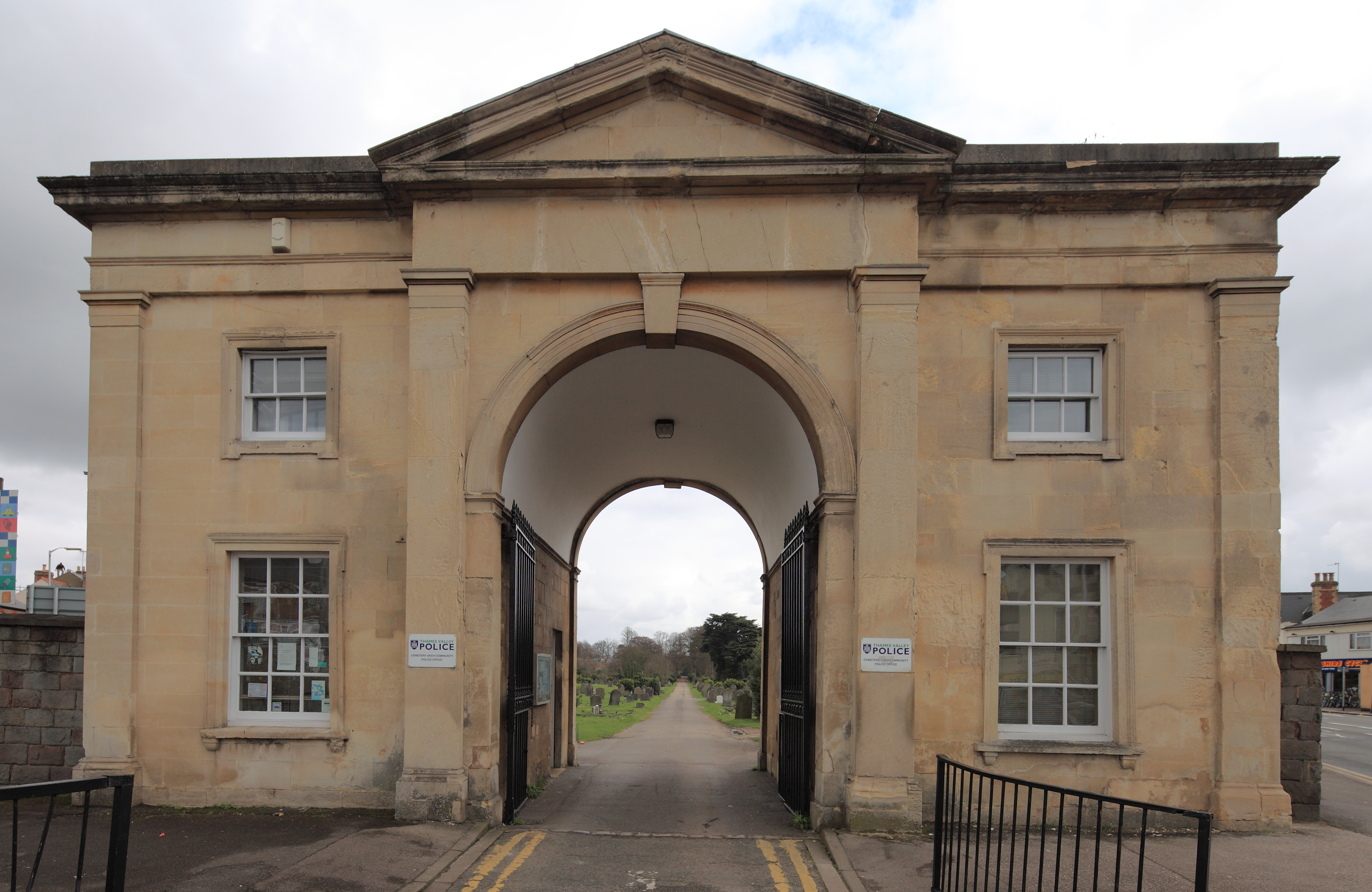
Grand ornamental gatehouse to Reading Old Cemetery

== Facilities ==
A local retail area has grown up around Cemetery Junction, including food shops, takeaway food outlets, public houses and a pharmacy. Also at the junction are the Wycliffe Baptist Church and the former Arthur Hill Swimming Pool, which closed in 2016.

== Governance ==
Cemetery Junction is within the Borough of Reading, but is split between two wards of that borough. The north and east sides of the junction are in Park ward, whilst the south and west sides are in Redlands ward.

== Transport ==
Several bus routes serve Cemetery Junction, including:

- Reading Buses route 4 and 4a: Reading–Wokingham–Bracknell
- Reading Buses routes 13 and 14: Reading–Woodley
- Reading Buses route 17: Tilehurst Water Tower–Reading–Earley (Three Tuns)
- Carousel/Thames Valley route 127: Reading–Twyford–Maidenhead
- Thames Valley routes 128 amd 129: Reading–Twyford–Wokingham
- Carousel route 850: Reading–Twyford–Henley–Marlow–High Wycombe

== Eponymous film ==
Cemetery Junction is the title of a 2010 film, directed by Stephen Merchant and Ricky Gervais, which was released in the UK on 14 April 2010 and which tackles love and class in Reading in 1973. Gervais explained that the title of the film was taken from Cemetery Junction, Reading, an area he knew as a child. Gervais also adds "[...] it's not really set in Reading, it's any small town, anywhere in the world to be honest."
