= Reading Old Cemetery =

Cemetery in Reading, Berkshire, England

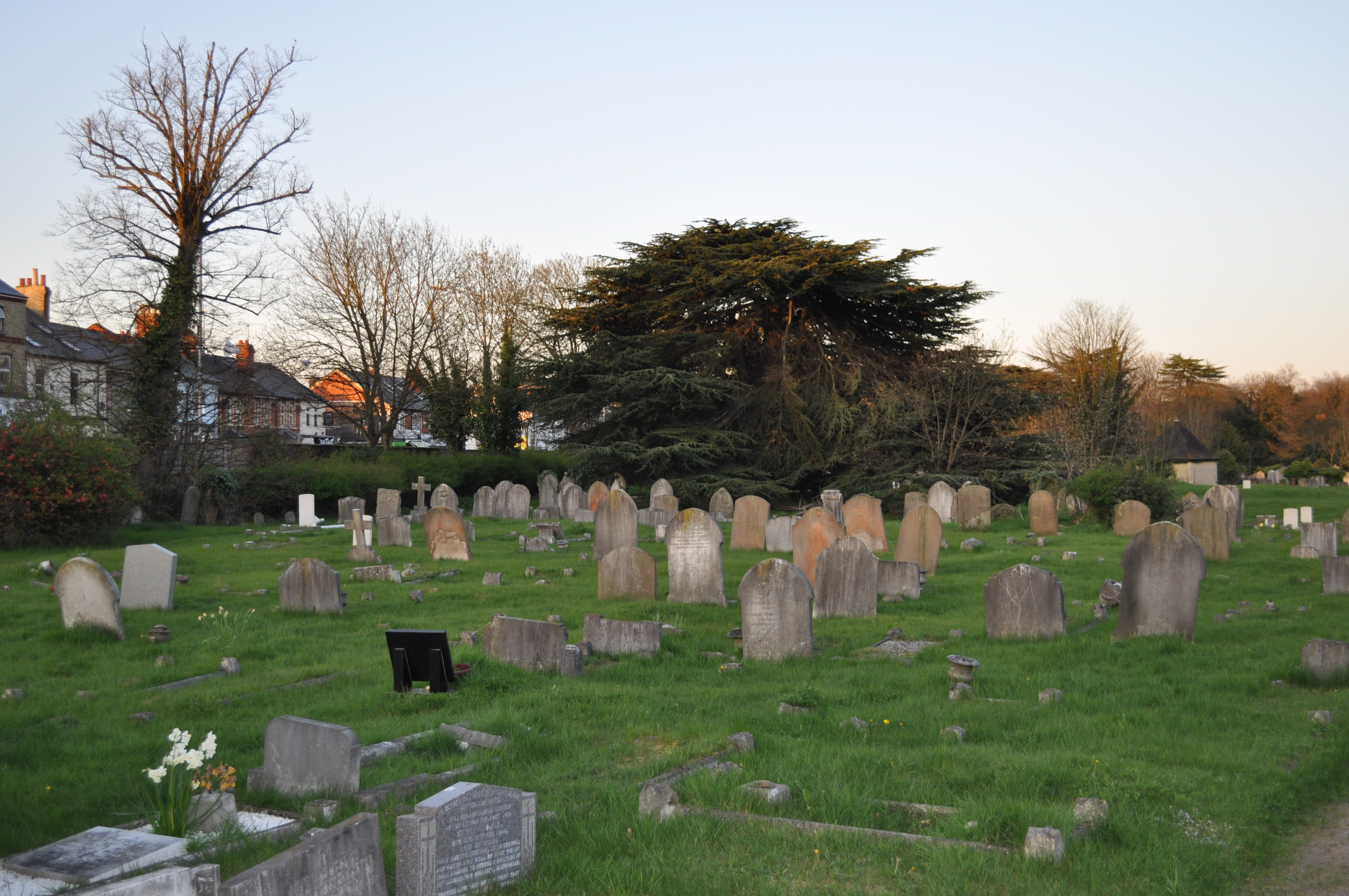
- Section of Reading Old Cemetery
- Interactive map of Reading Old Cemetery

Details
- Established: 1842
- Location: Reading, Berkshire, UK
- Coordinates: 51.4532°N 0.9459°W
- Size: 11.5 acres (47,000 m^{2})
- No. of graves: 18,327

Reading Old Cemetery (originally Reading Cemetery) is situated in the eastern part of Reading, Berkshire, England. It is located immediately to the east of Cemetery Junction, a major road junction in Reading. The cemetery is Grade II listed.

Henley Road Cemetery is one of three cemeteries maintained by Reading Borough Council, alongside Henley Road Cemetery and Caversham Cemetery.

== History ==
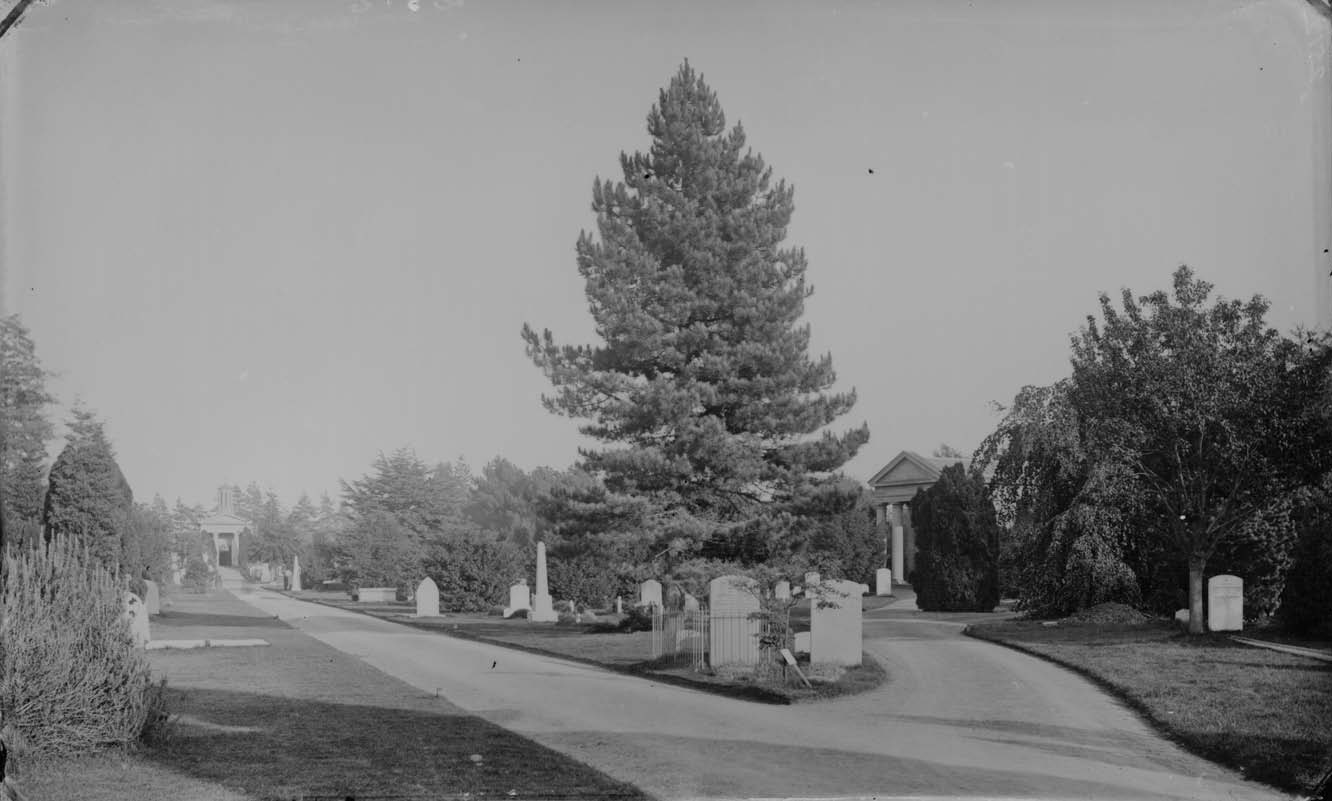
Reading Cemetery, c. 1875 by Henry Taunt

Reading Cemetery Company Act 1842
- Act of Parliament
- Parliament of the United Kingdom
- Long title: An Act for establishing a General Cemetery for the Interment of the Dead in the Parish of Sonning, near the Town of Reading, in the County of Berks.
- Citation: 5 & 6 Vict. c. cix

Dates
- Royal assent: 30 July 1842

Other legislation
- Repealed by: Berkshire Act 1986

Status: Repealed

Text of statute as originally enacted

Reading Cemetery was set up by a local act of Parliament, the Reading Cemetery Company Act 1842 (5 & 6 Vict. c. cix), establishing the Reading Cemetery Company. The first interment took place in 1843. It was one of many cemeteries built in the Victorian era in response to the rapid population increase in the 19th century.

Reading Cemetery was built on farm land outside the existing borough boundaries at a site called Hattons Platt, which was owned by a Mr. Cholmeley. Initially, few people decided their family buried in the new cemetery until the 1850s, by time when the situation got so bad that the three cemeteries in the centre of Reading were closed.

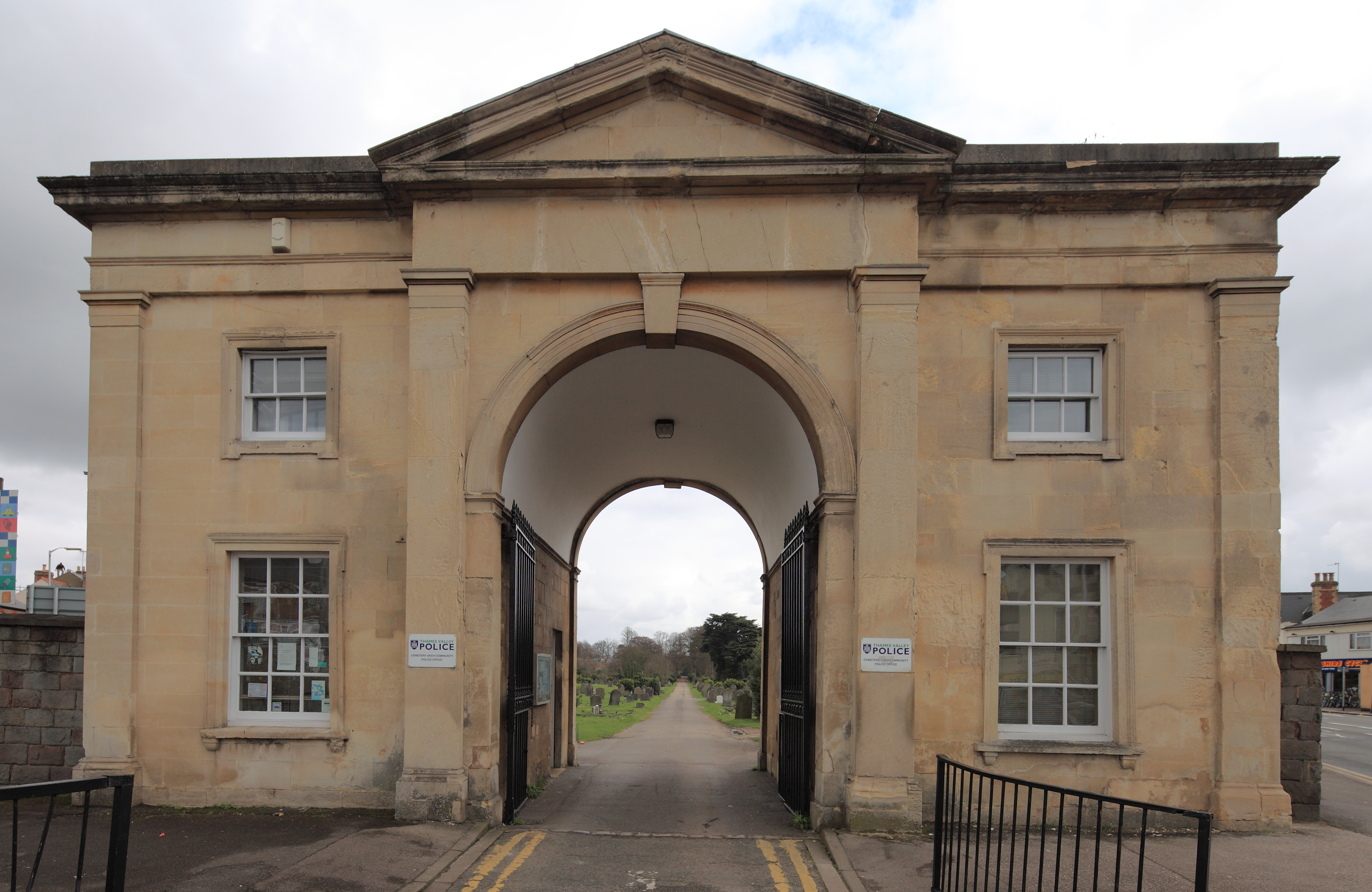
The Grade II listed Gatehouse on Cemetery Junction

The cemetery itself, and within it the entrance lodges and the Sarcophagus Monument, are all Grade II listed buildings.

== Chapels ==
The cemetery originally included two chapels, one for Anglicans and one for Dissenters. Burials were also divided between the Anglican consecrated ground and the Dissenters' non-consecrated ground and a small wall marked the boundary between the two.

== Extension ==
The cemetery was extended at its far end in the early 20th century and taken over by Reading Borough Council in 1959. Occasional burials still take place in plots purchased by families years ago. There are 18,327 grave spaces covering 11.5 acres (47,000 m^{2}).

== Memorials ==
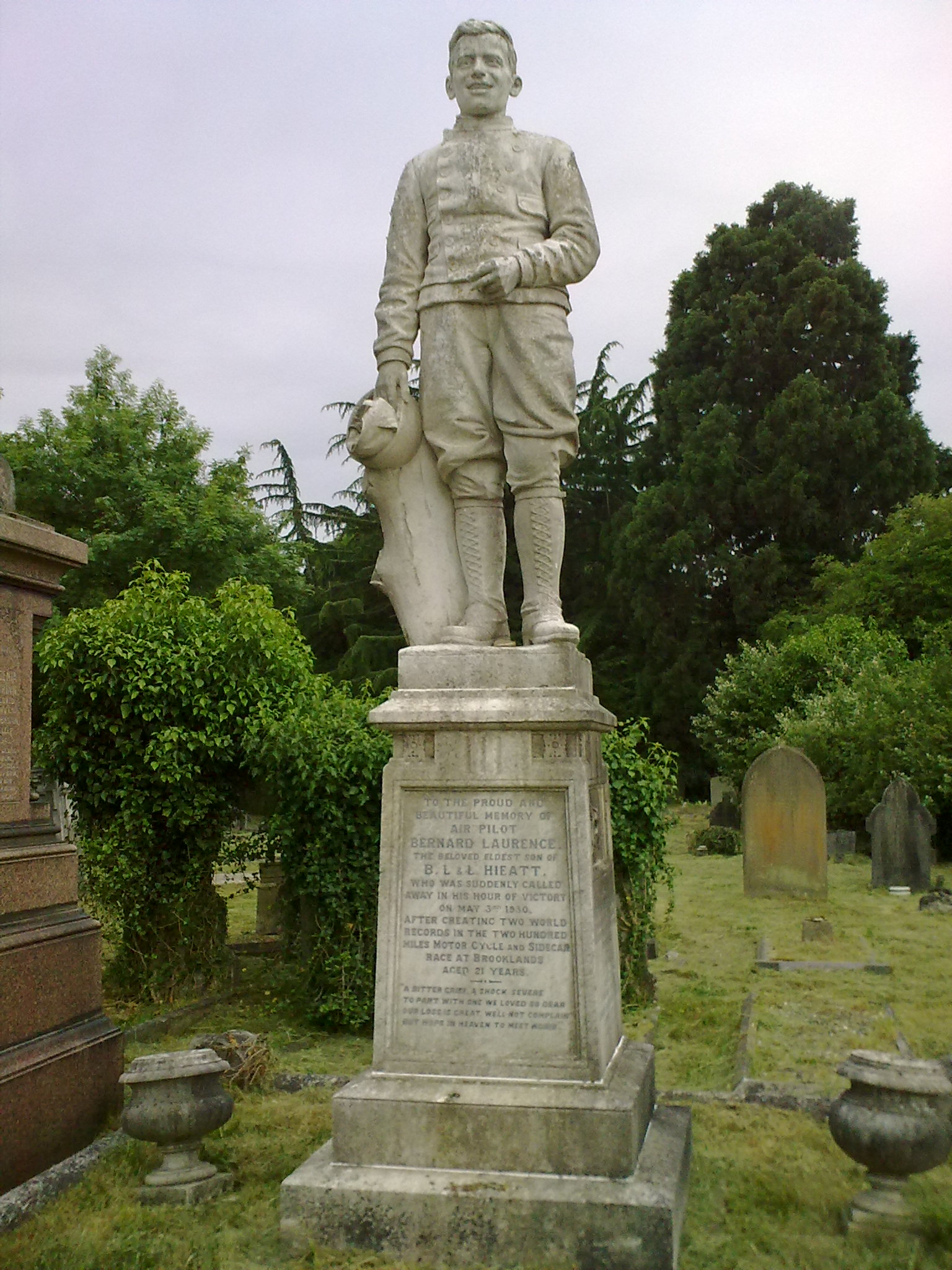
Bernard Laurence Hieatt memorial

The cemetery contains the graves of most of the historically noteworthy occupants of the town during the period 1843–1970. The site is of great local historical interest with many large memorials, three of which are Grade II listed. The three listed memorials are:

- the memorial to Bernard Laurence Hieatt, which occupies a plot at the eastern end. The memorial stands head and shoulders over most except the adjacent cross;
- the cast-iron urns on the site of the Dissenters chapel. The westernmost urn is dedicated to members of the Andrewes family and the easternmost urn to members of the Barratt family. This paved area is currently obscured by a huddling Beech tree.
- the marble sarcophagus of Mary Weiholt

The cemetery contains the war graves of 205 Commonwealth service personnel of World War I (besides one Serbian serviceman of the same war) and 41 of World War II. There is a large war graves plot in the back of the cemetery, in the right hand corner from the entrance. Here stands a Screen Wall memorial to those buried in Plot 72 and elsewhere in the cemetery whose graves could not be marked by headstones. Many other memorials are in the cemetery including three Old Contemptibles who served in the British Expeditionary Force and survived the Great War:

- Lance Corporal William Marshall MM, 2nd Royal Berkshire Regiment
- Captain Philip Knightley, Royal Army Medical Corps, died 9 April 1965
- 2nd Lieutenant Ernest William Ellis, 5th Royal Berkshire Regiment

Other notable memorials are for Joseph Edward Sydenham, the founder of Reading F.C. who died in 1913, and that of William "Willie" Wimmera, an Aboriginal Australian boy who died in 1852, aged 11, from tuberculosis and peritonitis after missionaries brought him to Reading. The grave of Mary Gordon Burnett and Hugh Edward Walford who set up the successful Reading Blind Aid Society are also there. Miss Burnett is buried in the family grave with her father Henry Burnett. The family are associated with Charles Dickens with Henry being his brother-in-law and inspired the character of Nicholas Nickleby.

== Maintenance ==
Reading Borough Council maintains the cemetery on a conservation basis. The grass is cut, by strimmer, on four occasions per year and is raked off only if excess growth makes it necessary. The council also carry out interments in existing graves, there being no new graves available on this site. These burials, including those of cremated remains, are currently in single figures per year. Several Muntjac Deer live in the cemetery grounds.

== See also ==
- List of parks and open spaces in Reading, Berkshire
