= Fobney Lock =

Lock on the River Kennet in Berkshire, England

Coordinates: 51.43362°N 0.98722°W

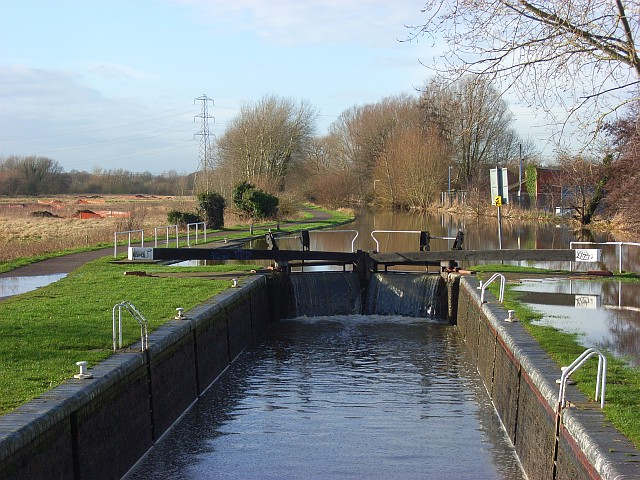
The lock looking upstream

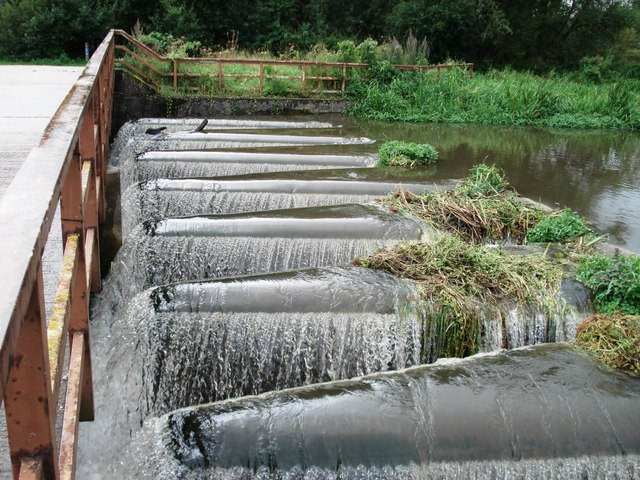
Fobney Weir

Fobney Lock is a lock on the River Kennet to the south of Coley Park in the English town of Reading. Between the lock cut and the river itself is Fobney Island, which is home to the Fobney Island Wetland Nature Reserve. At the western end of the island is Fobney Weir, whilst beside the lock is the Fobney Pumping Station. The name Fobney appears to derive from the name of a field, Vobeneye, recorded in deeds as being owned by Reading Abbey as early as 1308.

Fobney Lock was built between 1718 and 1723, under the supervision of the engineer John Hore, as part of the Kennet Navigation between Reading and Newbury. With the opening, in 1810, of the Kennet and Avon Canal between Newbury and the Avon Navigation at Bath, Forbney Lock became part of the principle water route between London and Bristol. The lock, navigation ans canal are now administered by the Canal & River Trust. The lock has a rise/fall of 7 ft 8 in (2.34 m).

The whole complex of lock, weir, pumping station and nature reserve lies within Coley ward of Reading Borough Council. It is accessible by boat, on foot along the towpath, or by vehicle from the south along Island Road. There is a small car park on this road just to the south of the lock.

== Fobney Island Wetland Nature Reserve ==
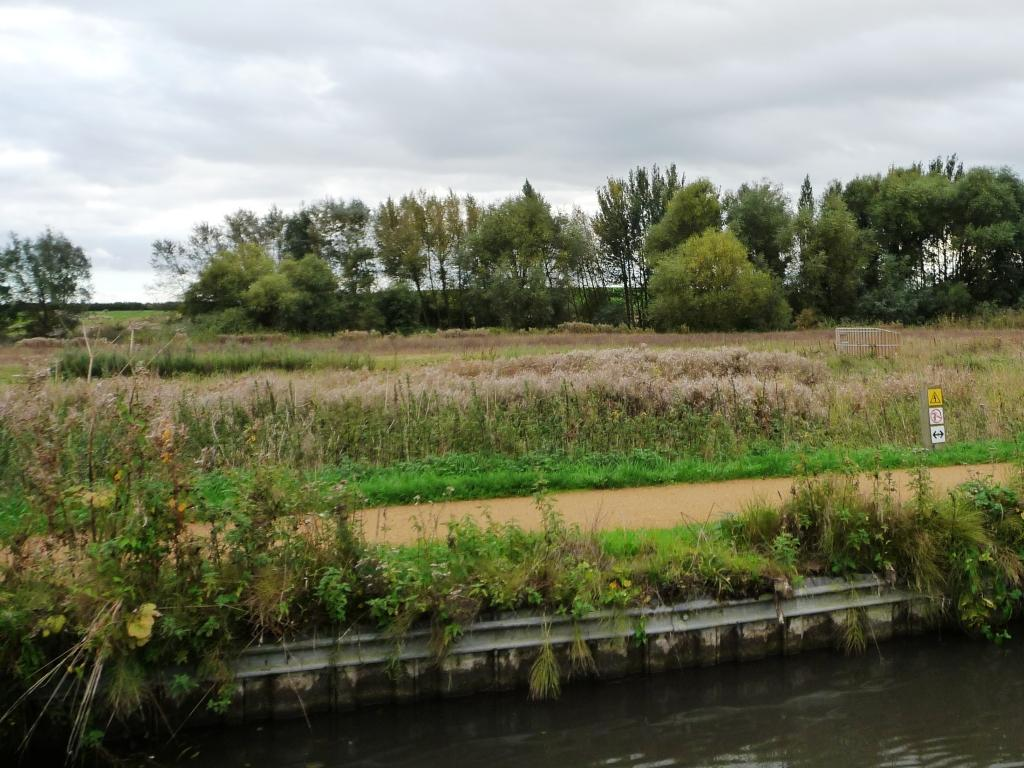
The Fobney Island Wetland Reserve

Between 2011 and 2013, the bulk of Fobney Island was transformed into a nature reserve. The island lies between the natural course of the Kennet (to the south) and the artificial navigation channel to Fobney Lock (to the north). At its western (upstream) end the two waterways diverge at Fobney Weir, whilst at its eastern end they reunite just downstream of Fobney Lock. In addition to the reserve, the island accommodates a short stretch of Island Road, and a towpath.

The project to create the nature reserve involved the introduction of new river gravels to the river course to create riffles. On the island itself, the ground level was lowered to allow for more frequent flooding, together with the creation of wetland, a hay meadow and reed beds. It was intended that the resulting habitats would attract wildlife, including birds, bats, water voles, and otters.

A survey during 2014/5 showed that there were nearly 200 species of plants in the reserve. Annual surveys indicate that over 100 species of birds are present, along with 15 species of odonata, including dragonflies and damselflies, and five species of bats. The site is maintained by Reading Borough Council, assisted by the “Friends of Fobney Island” volunteer group.

See also: List of parks and open spaces in Reading, Berkshire

== Fobney Pumping Station ==
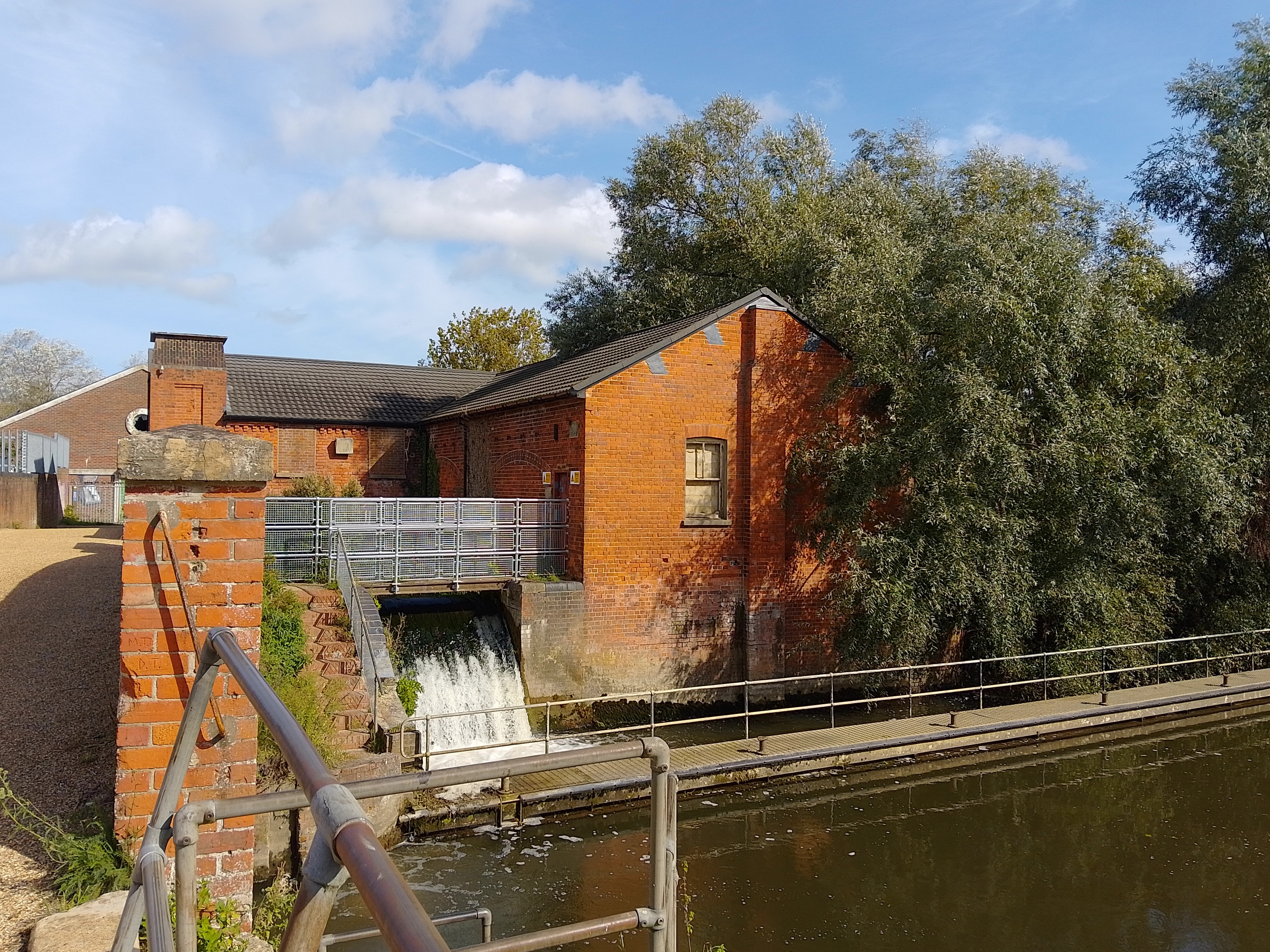
Fobney Pumping Station

Fobney Pumping Station was opened by Reading Corporation in 1878 to pump water out of the River Kennet and treat it in an adjoining water treatment works. In doing so it used two boatloads of coal a day, shipped to it along the same river. Initially it could process 18 million litres of water a day. The extracted water was initially filtered through coke, clinker and gravel, followed by polarite and sand.

In 1896, the earlier pumping station at Southcote Lock, one lock above Fobney, was closed, and the Fobney station was expanded to handle 31.5 million litres as a replacement. The pumping station remained in use until 1985, when it was replaced by the nearby Fobney Water Treatment Works. Over that period, responsibility for the station transferred several times: in 1959 to the Thames Valley Water Board, in 1973 to the Thames Water Authority, and in 1989 to Thames Water Limited.

== See also ==
- Locks on the Kennet and Avon Canal

Next lock upstream	River Kennet / Kennet and Avon Canal	Next lock downstream
Southcote Lock	Fobney Lock; Grid reference SU705710	County Lock
