= Balmore Walk =

Public park in Caversham in the English borough of Reading

- Balmore Park
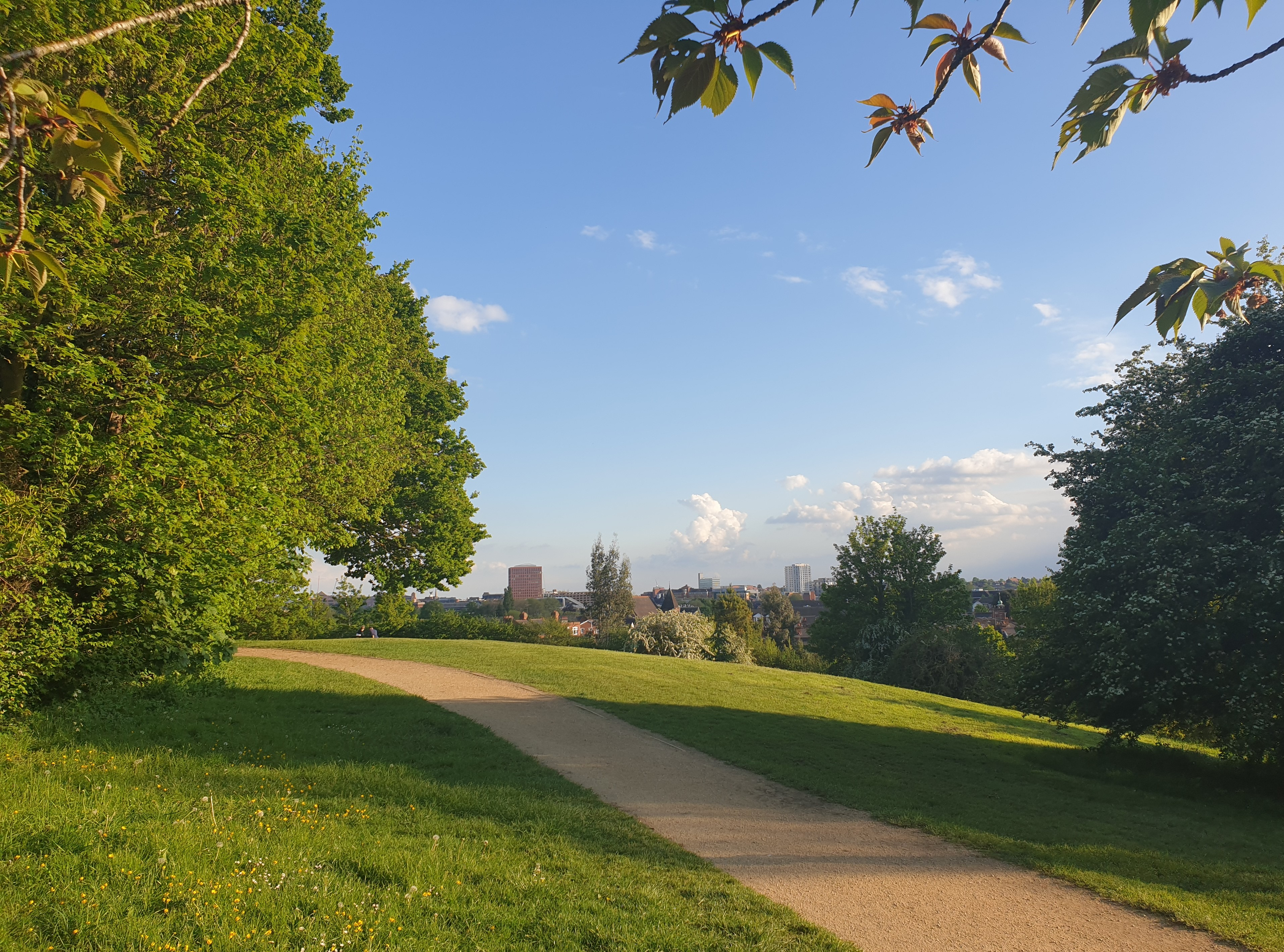
- View from Balmore Walk

- Location within Reading, Berkshire
- Interactive map of Balmore Walk
- Type: Public
- Location: Reading, Berkshire, UK
- Coordinates: 51°28′19″N 0°58′23″W

Balmore Walk, also known as Balmore Park, is a public park in the village and suburb of Caversham in the English town of Reading. The park runs from north to south along the brow of a bank, with good views over Caversham and Reading. There are pedestrian entrances to the park from Hemdean Road, Rotherfield Way, Balmore Drive, the Ridgeway and Peppard Road, whilst National Cycle Route 5 runs the length of the park from Peppard Road to Rotherfield Way.

Balmore Walk is mostly grassland, with a scattering of individual mature Hawthorn bushes and Corsican Pine trees. There is also a hay meadow, and a small woodland with mature oak and beech trees.

The steep bank of what is now Balmore Walk, but was then known as Balmer's Field, played a part in the Siege of Reading during the English Civil War. The Roundhead forces, under the command of the Earl of Essex, forced the Royalists to retreat up the hillside, maintaining their control of Caversham Bridge.

== See also ==
- List of parks and open spaces in Reading, Berkshire
