= Streptomyces pratens =

Scientific classification
- Domain: Bacteria
- Kingdom: Bacillati
- Phylum: Actinomycetota
- Class: Actinomycetia
- Order: Streptomycetales
- Family: Streptomycetaceae
- Genus: Streptomyces
- Species: S. pratens

Binomial name
- Streptomyces pratens Kim et al. 2012

Type strain
- CGMCC 4.5800, KACC 20904, BK138

Species of bacterium

Streptomyces pratens is a bacterium species from the genus of Streptomyces which has been isolated from soil from a hay meadow.

== See also ==
- List of Streptomyces species
