= Hills Meadow =

Riverside park in Reading, England

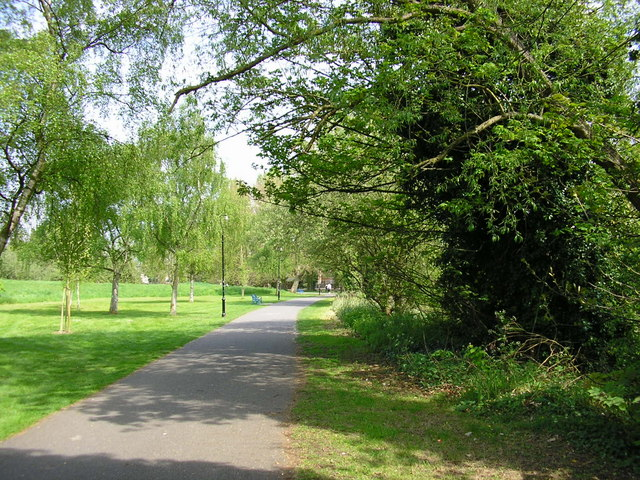
- Path at Hills Meadow

- Location within Reading, Berkshire
- Type: Public
- Location: Reading, Berkshire, UK
- Coordinates: 51°27′45″N 0°57′56″W

Hills Meadow is a park in Reading, Berkshire, England, located next to the River Thames. It stretches along the north (Caversham) side of the river, to the east of Reading Bridge. It is linked to the south (Reading) bank by a footpath, locally known as The Clappers that crosses View Island and the weir at Caversham Lock.

The meadows are named after Arthur Hill, a former mayor of Reading and half-brother of Octavia Hill, the social reformer and co-founder of the National Trust. Arthur Hill was a former owner of the meadows, which were acquired by Reading Corporation after his death in 1909.

Hills Meadow form part of a series of riverside open spaces, managed by Reading Borough Council, that stretch along one or other side of the River Thames throughout its passage through Reading. From west to east these are Thameside Promenade, Caversham Court, Christchurch Meadows, Hills Meadow, View Island and King's Meadow. Hills Meadow is connected to Christchurch Meadows by a pedestrian arch under Reading Bridge.

The park offers walkways alongside a tree-lined backwater of the Thames, together with a BMX track, a skateboarding ramp and car parking. Hills Meadow is the traditional venue for fairs and circuses visiting the town.

== See also ==
- List of parks and open spaces in Reading, Berkshire
