= Christchurch Meadow =

Christchurch Meadow, or Christ Church Meadow, and in the singular or plural, may refer to:

- Christchurch Meadow, Belper, a football ground in Belper, Derbyshire, England
- Christchurch Meadows, Reading, a riverside park in Reading, Berkshire, England
- Christ Church Meadow, a meadow in Oxford, Oxfordshire, England
