= King's Meadow, Reading =

Riverside park in Reading, England

King's Meadow
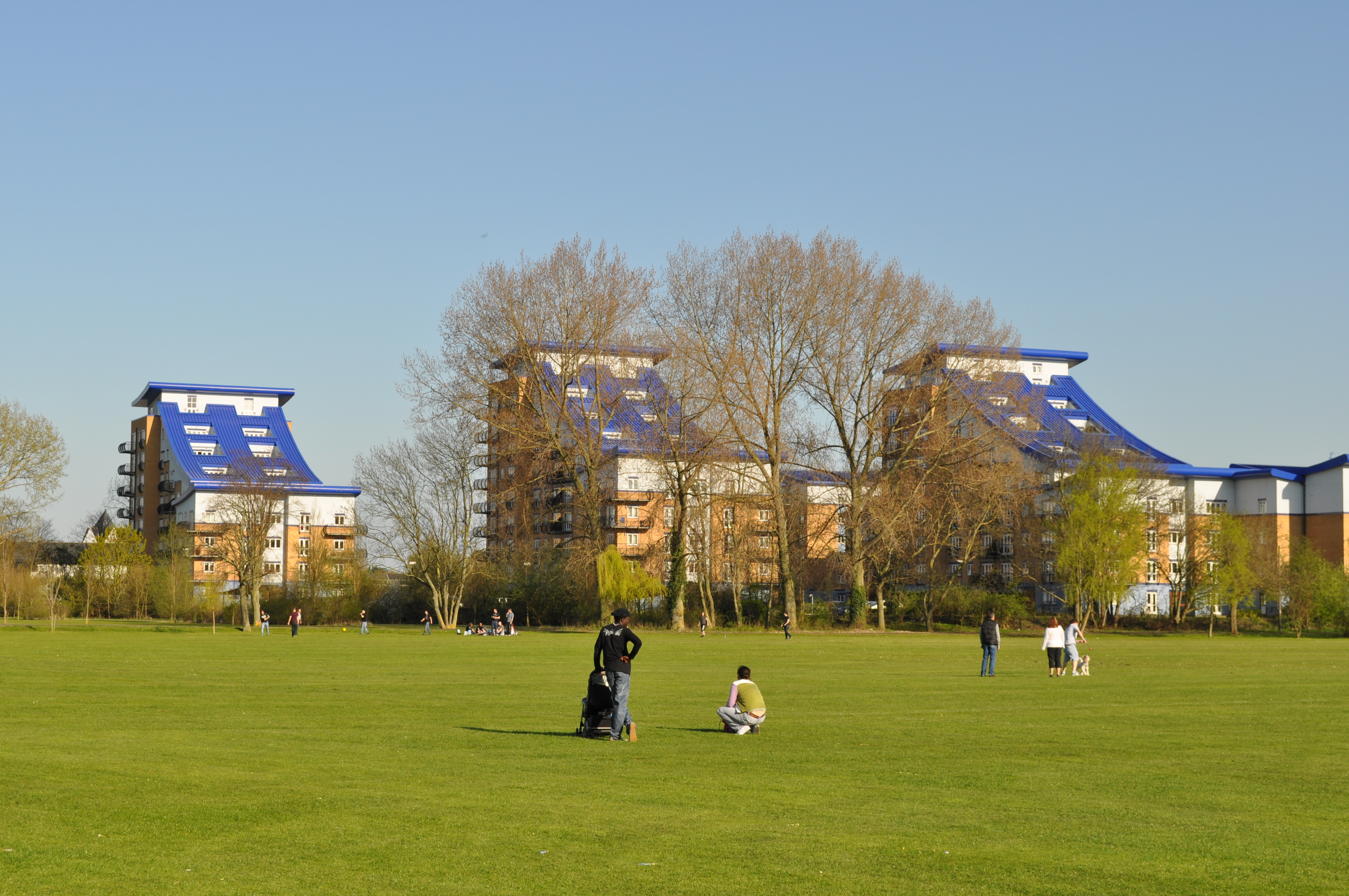
- King's Meadow and new apartments

- Location within Reading, Berkshire
- Type: Public
- Location: Reading, Berkshire, UK
- Coordinates: 51°27′36″N 0°57′40″W
- Area: 12 acres (4.9 ha)

King's Meadow, historically known as Reading Recreation Ground, is a park in Reading, Berkshire, England, located next to the River Thames. It stretches from the Coal Woodland (so-called because it used to be the site of a coal heap) to King's Meadow Road near Reading Bridge. The Thames Path long distance footpath runs through the length of King's Meadow, which is visible from the railway when entering or leaving Reading railway station from the eastern side.

King's Meadow forms part of a series of riverside open spaces, managed by Reading Borough Council, that stretch along one or other side of the River Thames throughout its passage through Reading. From west to east these are Thameside Promenade, Caversham Court, Christchurch Meadows, Hills Meadow, View Island and King's Meadow.

== History ==
King's Meadow was a possession of Reading Abbey and became owned by the King after the dissolution of the monasteries. This area has long been used as the site of a variety of public events such as Reading market, a race course, Reading shows and fairs. In 1869 the town of Reading purchased 12 acres (4.9 ha) of the meadow as a recreation ground, hence the Reading Recreation Ground name. This ground was home to Reading F.C. from its foundation in 1871 until 1878, when they moved to Coley Recreation Ground.

King's Meadow is also the location of the once disused King's Meadow swimming pool, which was built there in 1903. The future of the building was a subject of local controversy until 2015 when Reading Borough Council approved a renovation project to turn it into the Thames Lido. The restoration was completed in 2017; as well as reopening the pool, there is a restaurant, small spa and private dining facilities.

== Features ==
The park's landscape is open fields of short grass right up to the river bank, with some perimeter trees and an avenue from Napier Road. It is a popular picnic site with groups of mature trees. The park is prone to flooding, but there are playing fields used by the public and football clubs throughout the year.

There is a pleasant walk along the towpath up to Reading Bridge and Caversham Lock is at the eastern end. It is also a popular spot for mooring and fishing. To the east of the park is a large Tesco supermarket.

== Events ==
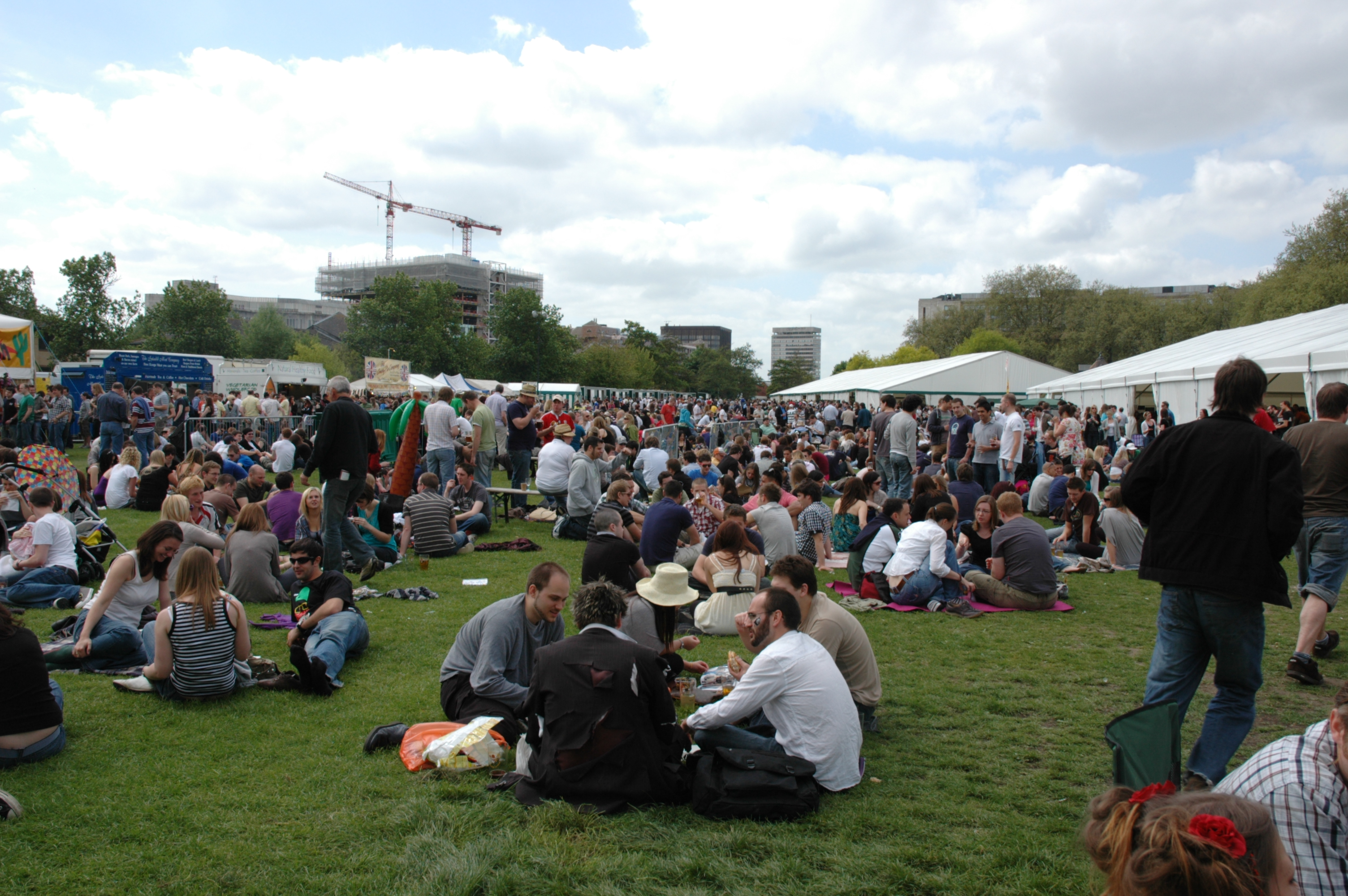
Reading Beer Festival

It is the location of several annual events in Reading, such as the Reading Pride festival. For many years it was also the site of the annual, but now defunct, Reading Beer Festival.

== See also ==
- List of parks and open spaces in Reading, Berkshire
