= Thames Lido =

Historic open air swimming pool and lido in Reading, UK

Coordinates: 51.4602°N 0.9654°W

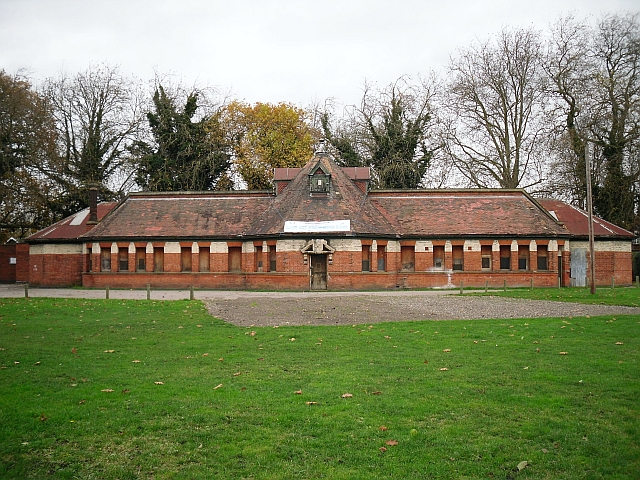
- King's Meadow swimming pool in 2012
- Interactive map of Thames Lido
- Former names: Ladies Swimming Bath
- Location: King's Meadow, Reading, Berkshire
- Owner: Reading Borough Council
- Type: Lido
- Dimensions: Length: 37 metres (121 ft); Width: 14 metres (46 ft)

Construction
- Opened: 1902
- Closed: 1974

Website
- thameslido.com

The Thames Lido, formerly known as the King's Meadow swimming pool, is an open-air swimming pool or lido located in King's Meadow in Reading, Berkshire. It was first opened to the public in 1903 as the Ladies Swimming Bath and is believed to be the oldest surviving outdoor municipal pool of a similar early Edwardian era. In August 2004, as a result of a campaign, the building was awarded Grade II listed building status. It re-opened in 2017 after three years of restoration.

== History ==
The pool traces its ancestry back to 1860 as a bathing area. In 1879, Reading Corporation (now Reading Borough Council) built the largest pool in the South of England, 260 ft (79 m) x 80 ft (24 m), but for men only.

The current pool 120 ft (37 m) x 45 ft (14 m) was built in 1902 near the men's pool (now demolished) so that women could also swim there. It had changing booths and showers and a very high degree of architectural detail, most of which was manufactured locally. The water supply was originally fed from the nearby River Thames.

During the 1950s the water treatment method for the pool changed to mains supply. A heating system was installed, but never used. The pool was closed to the public in 1974, reopening in Autumn 2017.

== Current status ==
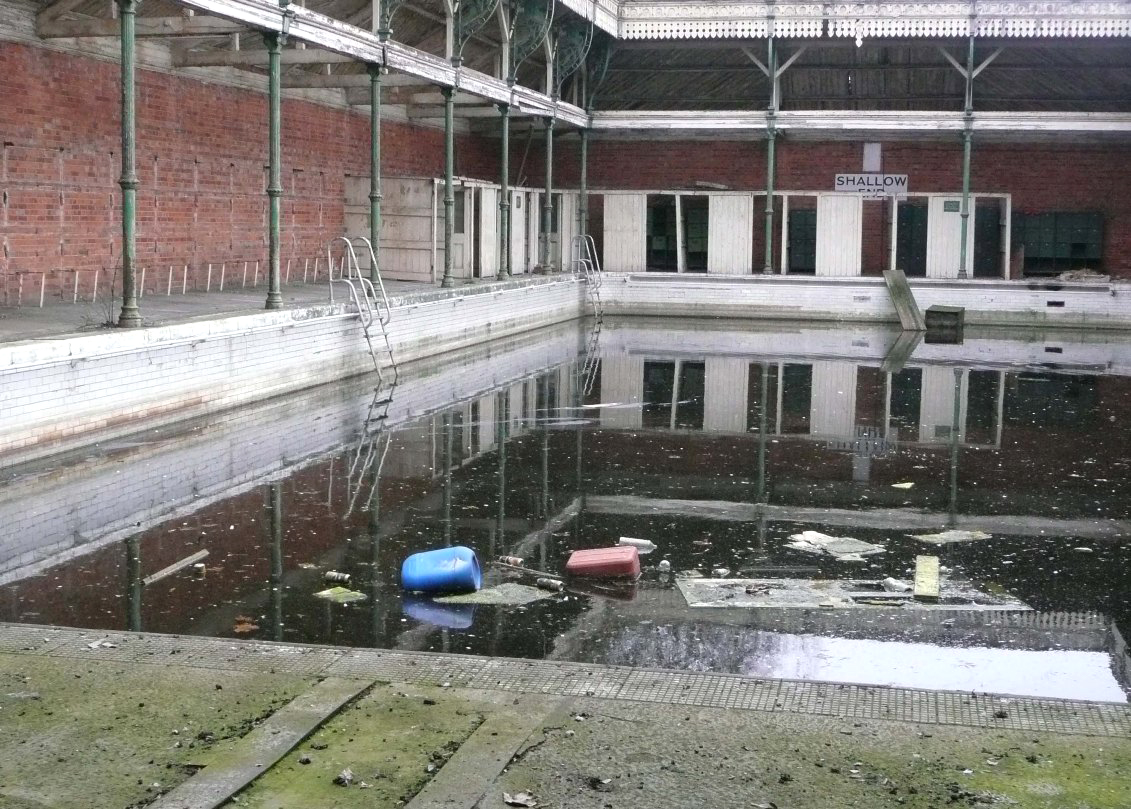
King's Meadow swimming pool in March 2009

During the 1990s, the Reading Sub Aqua Club took a lease on the premises and established a non-swimming meeting place, with an intention of creating a regional diving trading centre. The outside of the building became graffitied, vandalised and fell into disrepair. Reading Borough Council invited proposals for the future of the site and, in April 2009, developers Askett Hawk were given permission to build a hotel at the site.

In September 2009, the council rejected the proposal to grant a 250-year lease to Askett Hawk and decided to give a local campaign group the opportunity to develop a scheme to restore the pool for public use.

In 2015 Reading Borough Council approved the renovation of the Lido. The restoration was completed in 2017; as well as reopening the pool, there is a restaurant, small spa and private dining facilities.
