= Caversham Court =

Public park and former country house in Southern England

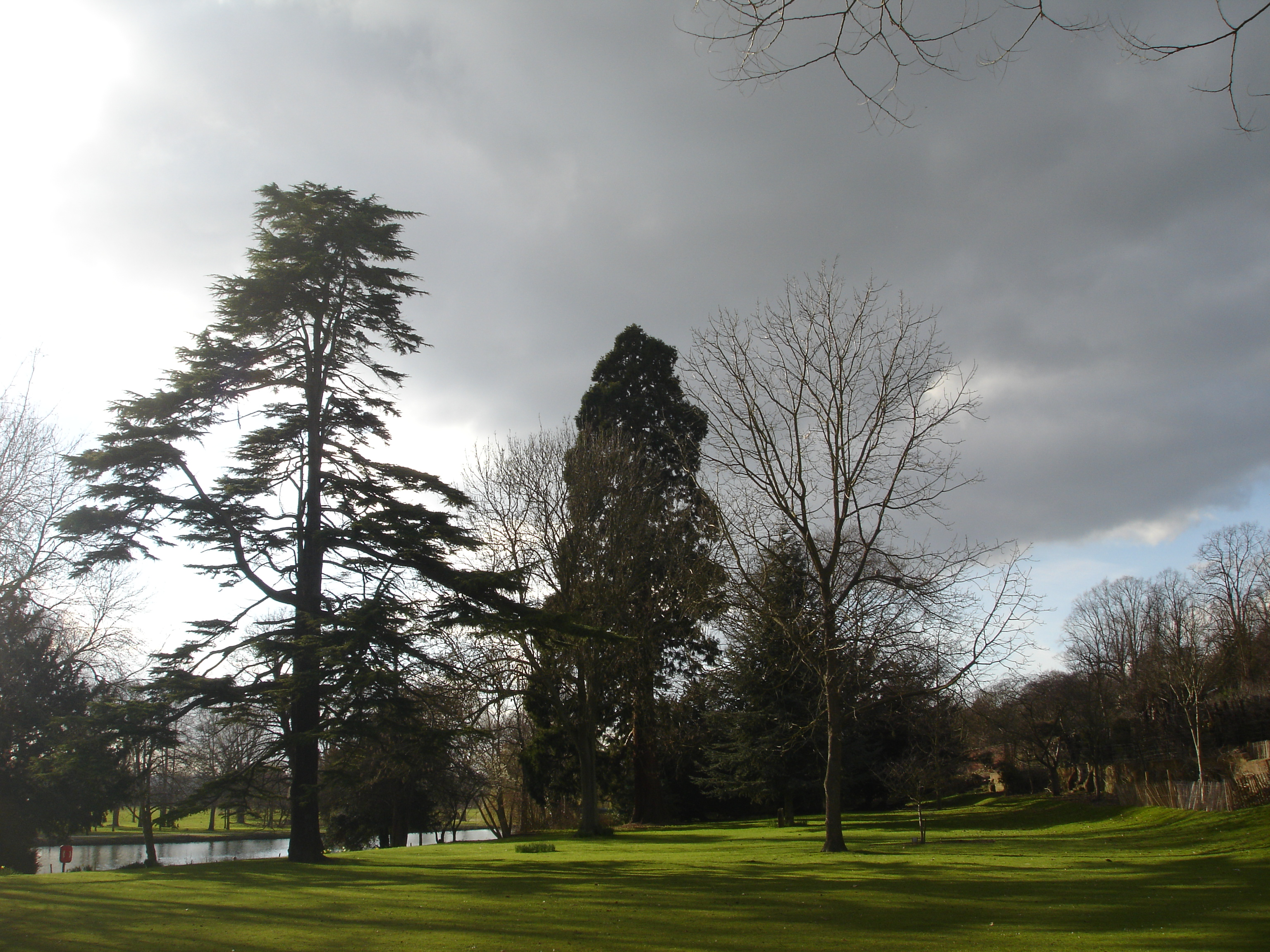
- View of Caversham Court gardens and the River Thames

- Location within Reading, Berkshire
- Interactive map of Caversham Court
- Location: Caversham, Berkshire, UK
- Coordinates: 51.468°N 0.980°W
- Area: 1.3 hectares (3.2 acres)
- Owner: Reading Borough Council
- Website: Reading Borough Council page

Caversham Court is a public garden and was a mansion located on the north bank of the River Thames in Caversham, a suburb of Reading in the English county of Berkshire (formerly in Oxfordshire). The park lies within the St Peter's conservation area. The park is listed as Grade II in the National Register of Historic Parks and Gardens.

Caversham Court gardens forms part of a series of riverside open spaces, managed by Reading Borough Council, that stretch along one or other side of the River Thames throughout its passage through Reading. From west to east these are Thameside Promenade, Caversham Court, Christchurch Meadows, Hills Meadow, View Island and King's Meadow.

== House ==
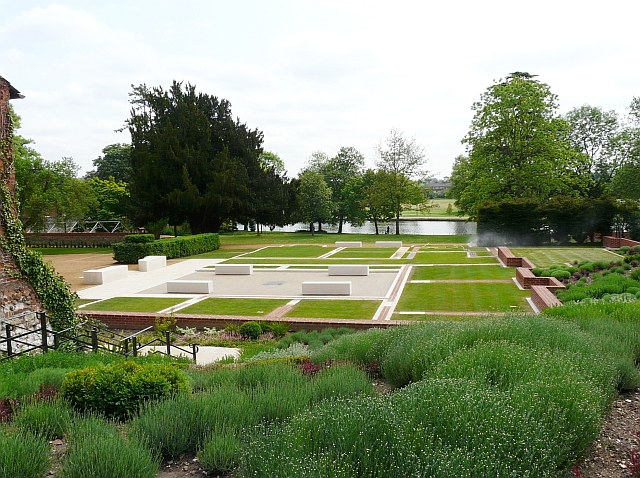
The House Footprint

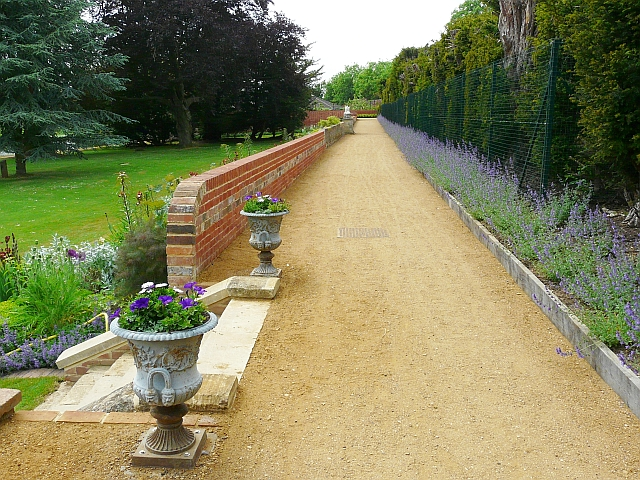
The Long Walk

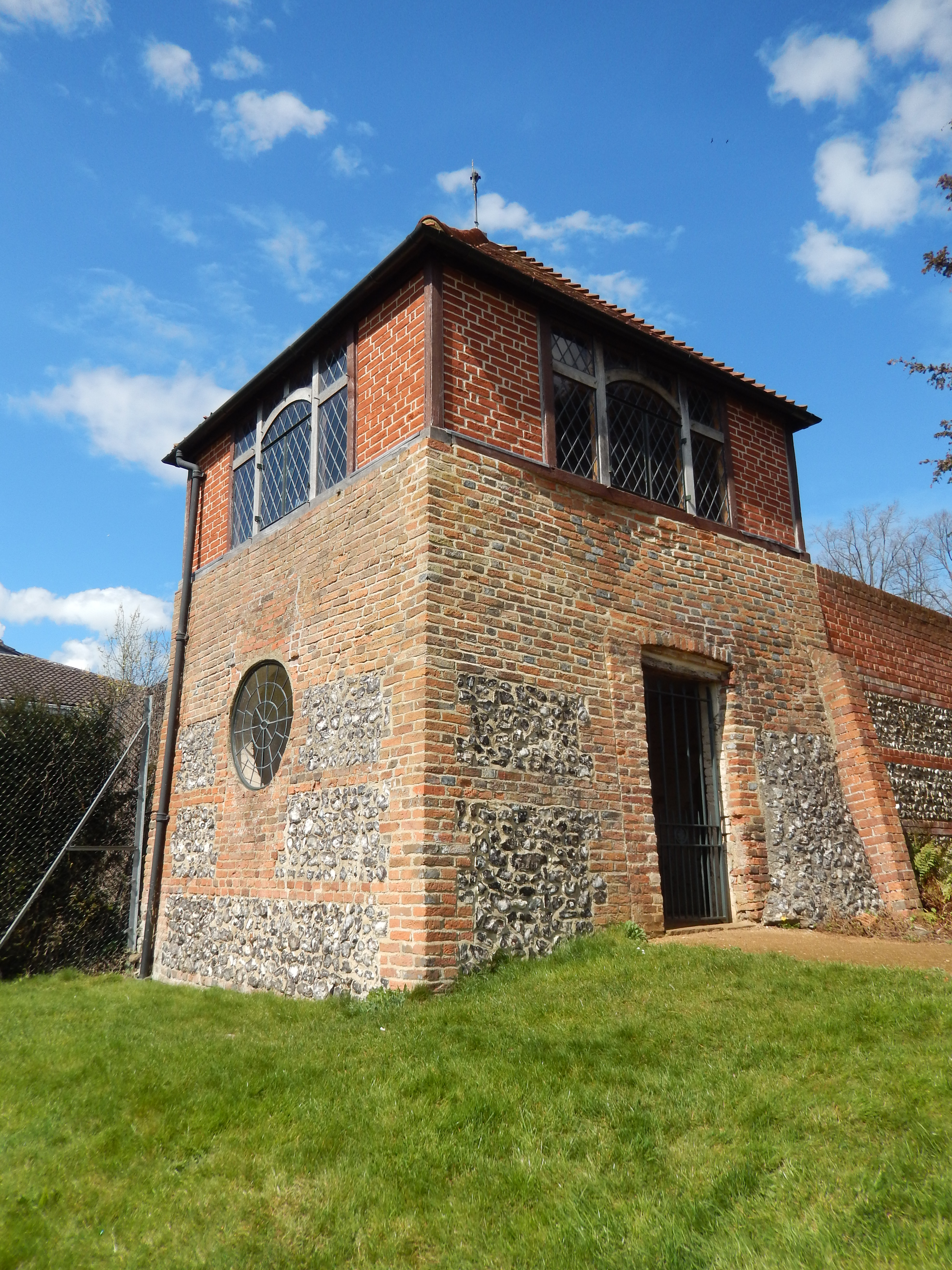
The gazebo

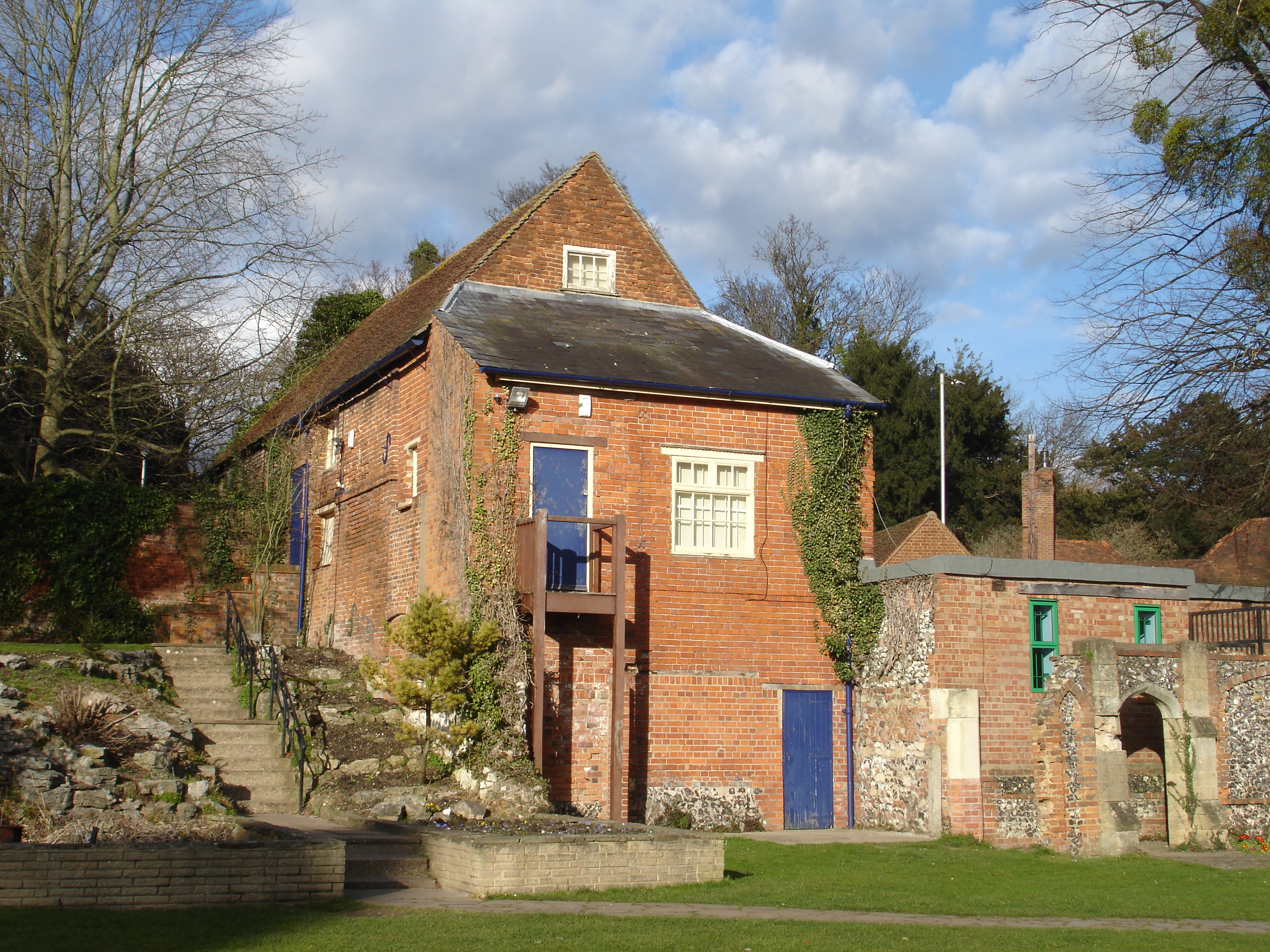
The former stable block

The medieval community of Caversham was clustered on the north side of Caversham Bridge to the east of St Peter's Church, which was built in the 12th century. Walter Giffard, the second Earl of Buckingham, donated the land for the church and neighbouring rectory, together with a considerable amount of land around it, to the Augustinian Abbey of Notley near Long Crendon in Buckinghamshire. They erected a small monastic cell there.

After the Dissolution of the Monasteries, these lands were given to Christ Church, Oxford. Over the next four centuries, the Old Rectory, which became known as Caversham Court, was occupied by some of the most influential families in the Reading area, who both improved and enhanced the site.

A Tudor replacement for the original house was built around two courtyards. Its beautiful timber-framing led to its nickname of the Striped House. It had a 1638 staircase, with bullet holes from a Civil War attack, and an elaborate decorated plaster ceiling. Parts of both are preserved in the Museum of Reading. In the 1840s, the rectory and garden walls were rebuilt to a design by A W Pugin who gave the house a castellated facade with fretwork balustrading. The house was demolished in 1933.

== Gardens ==
=== History ===
The gardens were laid out between 1660 and 1681 by Thomas Loveday as a private retreat surrounding the house. In 1933 the rectory and grounds were sold to Reading Corporation, who demolished the house. Initially there were plans to use part of the site for road building. However, the gardens were opened to the public in Easter 1934. Caversham Court is currently owned by Reading Borough Council. Until its closure for restoration the site had been used for religious purposes by local Pagans. The garden was re-opened on 7 August 2009.

The garden contains a number of Grade II listed buildings and features: the riverside garden pavilion (gazebo), the retaining walls to the raised walk leading to the gazebo, the screen wall along the north east boundary (early to mid 19th century), the retaining walls of axial east–west garden terrace walk (17th century, probably rebuilt in the 18th century), the 17th century stables and the retaining wall of St. Peter's Churchyard and Church of St Peter (a crinkle crankle wall) (18th century). The two-storey gazebo, built by 1663, is one of the oldest remaining examples in the country. It was partially restored in 1979/80.

=== Layout ===
The gardens are laid out on three terraces and cover an area of 1.3 hectares (3.2 acres). The lower two consist of lawn dotted with mature trees; the upper terrace is the site of the old rectory and the original kitchen gardens which were converted to allotments during World War II as part of the "Dig for Victory" campaign. The allotments in the northwest corner preserve the boundaries of the kitchen gardens with its 'crinkle–crankle' wall and a tall yew hedge forming the southern boundary. The north boundary with the churchyard is 4 to 5 metres higher than the gardens below. In the northeast is the stable block of the former house.

Caversham Court contains a number of fine tree specimens in particular, a large Wellingtonia, a Bhutan Pine (Pinus wallichiana), a cedar of Lebanon, an Atlas cedar and a black mulberry near the main entrance. There are also massive yew hedges surrounding the allotment gardens in the north west of the park and an old layered yew, a feature popular in the seventeenth century, whereby a 'family' was created by layering to create a complete ring of 'offspring'.

=== Restoration ===
On 7 August 2009, the gardens reopened after a £1.6 million (US$2.5 million) restoration. The work has seen the establishment of a tea kiosk run by local charities and the proposal of a passenger ferry across the River Thames during events. Restoration work and ongoing maintenance of the gardens is promoted by the Friends of Caversham Court Gardens.

In 2010, the gardens won a Green Flag Award with Green Heritage Site Accreditation.

== Open-air theatre and performance ==
Caversham Court hosts the annual Reading Open Air Shakespeare festival, staged by Reading's Progress Theatre each July. The festival originated in 1995, and until 2008 was staged in the ruins of Reading Abbey. The closure of these ruins for safety reasons meant that the festival did not run in 2009 or 2010, but it was relocated to Caversham Court in 2011, where it has remained.

== See also ==
- List of parks and open spaces in Reading, Berkshire
