= List of parks and open spaces in Reading, Berkshire =

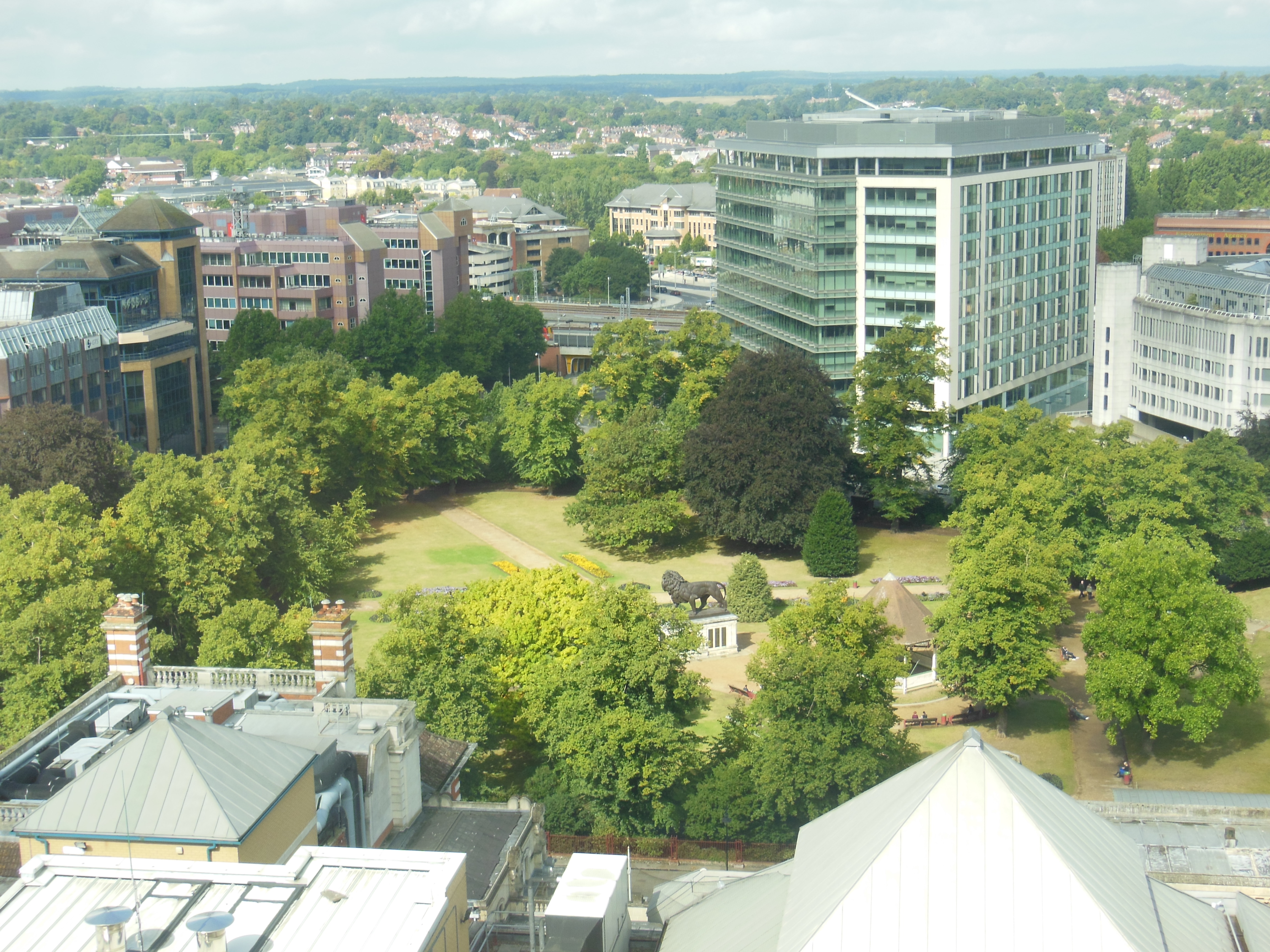
Forbury Gardens seen from The Blade. The parks alongside the Thames are shown by the trees in the middle distance.

The town of Reading, in the English county of Berkshire, has over 100 parks and playgrounds. Reading also has five local nature reserves and three cemeteries.

In the town centre is Forbury Gardens, a public park built on the site of the outer court of Reading Abbey. The largest public park in Reading is Prospect Park, an estate in west Reading previously owned by Frances Kendrick but acquired by Reading Corporation in 1901. This is complemented by Palmer Park, a purpose built public park in east Reading gifted to the town by the proprietors of Huntley & Palmers in 1889.

A string of parks and open spaces stretch along one or other side of the River Thames throughout its passage through Reading. From west to east these are Thameside Promenade, Caversham Court, Christchurch Meadows, Hills Meadow, View Island and King's Meadow.

== Public parks, gardens and recreation grounds ==
Most of the parks, gardens and recreation grounds are owned by Reading Borough Council. A few are owned privately, or by other public bodies, but all are normally open for public use.

- Abbey Ruins
- Arthur Newbery Park
- Balmore Walk
- Blagrave Recreation Ground
- Bug's Bottom
- Caversham Court
- Christchurch Meadows
- Cintra Park
- Coley Recreation Ground
- Courage Park
- Eldon Square
- Emmer Green Recreation Ground
- Fobney Island Wetland Nature Reserve
- Fobney Meadows Wildlife Conservation Area
- Forbury Gardens
- Harris Garden
- Hills Meadow
- John Rabson Recreation Ground
- Kensington Park
- King's Meadow
- Kings Road Gardens
- Longbarn Lane Recreation Ground
- Mapledurham Playing Fields
- McIlroy Park
- Palmer Park
- Prospect Park
- Robert Hewitt Recreation Ground
- Sol Joel Park
- Thames Valley Park
- Thameside Promenade
- The Cowsey
- View Island
- Waterloo Meadows
- Westfield Road Recreation Ground
- Whiteknights Park
- Whitley Wood Recreation Ground

== Nature reserves ==
These are all local nature reserves.

- Blundells Copse
- Clayfield Copse
- Lousehill Copse
- McIlroy Park
- Round Copse

== Cemeteries ==
The cemeteries listed are all managed by Reading Borough Council. Many of Reading's churches have a associated grave yard, but these are not listed here.

- Caversham Cemetery
- Henley Road Cemetery
- Reading Old Cemetery

== Private parks ==
These parks are privately owned and are not normally open to the public, although they may be crossed by public footpaths.

- Calcot Park
- Caversham Park
