= Christchurch Meadows, Reading =

Riverside park in Reading, England

Christchurch Meadows
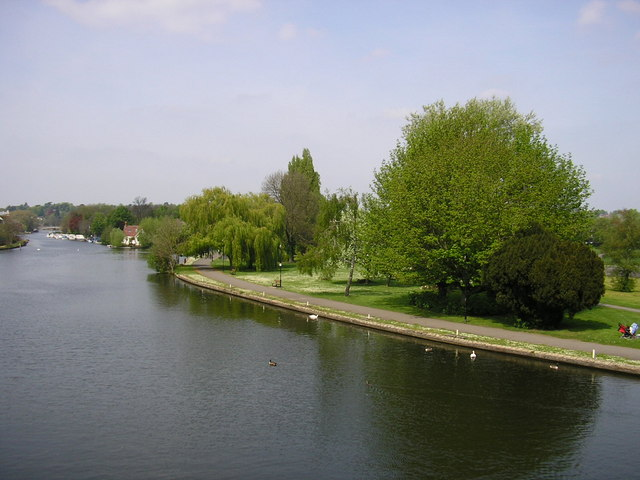
- Christchurch Meadows seen from Reading Bridge

- Location within Reading, Berkshire
- Interactive map of Christchurch Meadows
- Type: Public
- Location: Reading, Berkshire, UK
- Coordinates: 51°27′49″N 0°58′09″W

Christchurch Meadows is a park in Reading, Berkshire, England, located next to the River Thames. It stretches along the north (Caversham) side of the river, between Caversham Bridge and Reading Bridge, and is linked to the south (Reading) bank by the Christchurch Bridge, a pedestrian and cycle bridge built in 2015. The name of the meadow derives from Christ Church in Oxford, whose dean owned 25 acres (10 ha) of farmland in Reading.

Christchurch Meadows form part of a series of riverside open spaces, managed by Reading Borough Council, that stretch along one or other side of the River Thames throughout its passage through Reading. From west to east these are Thameside Promenade, Caversham Court, Christchurch Meadows, Hills Meadow, View Island and King's Meadow.

The park takes the form of a grass meadow along the river's edge, with specimen trees and shrubs along the bank. At the eastern end there is a fenced children’s play area, with a paddling/boating pool and picnic tables, and a number of sports pitches. A distinctive line of Lombardy poplars edges the eastern boundary. At the western end, the Caversham War Memorial and the Reading University Boat Club can be found.

A metalled footpath and cycleway runs along the river bank and provides an alternative to the formal route of the Thames Path long distance footpath, which runs along the built-up southern bank of the river between Reading and Caversham bridges. A second metalled footpath and cycleway connects the northern end of Christchurch Bridge with Gosbrook Road in Caversham, and intersects with the riverside path.

== See also ==
- List of parks and open spaces in Reading, Berkshire
