= View Island =

Island in the River Thames

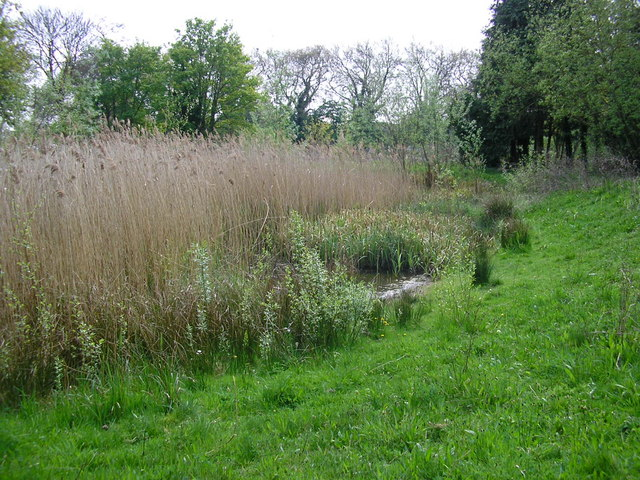
- Pond on View Island

- Location within Reading, Berkshire
- Type: Public
- Location: Reading, Berkshire, UK
- Coordinates: 51.462°N 0.963°W

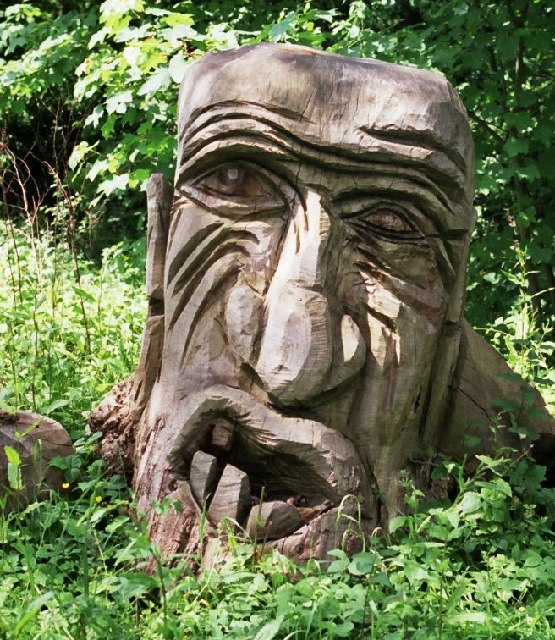
Carved wooden sculpture on View Island.

View Island is a small island near Caversham Lock, on the River Thames at Reading, Berkshire in England.

View Island forms part of a series of riverside open spaces, managed by Reading Borough Council, that stretch along one or other side of the River Thames throughout its passage through Reading. From west to east these are Thameside Promenade, Caversham Court, Christchurch Meadows, Hills Meadow, View Island and King's Meadow.

The island was a derelict boatyard when Reading Borough Council took it over in 1998 and restored it. It is a quiet, relaxing island with grassy paths and seating. It is set out as a small park containing several wooden chain-saw carved sculptures, although all but one having rotted away. It connects to Caversham via Heron Island, which has private riverside housing and is connected by road to Lower Caversham.

In February 2011, the body of Damian Whyte, a homeless man, was found on View Island. In October of the same year, Alan Levey was convicted of Whyte's murder, and sentenced to life imprisonment with a minimum tariff of 24 years.

In 2021, the new Reading Hydro community owned hydro-electric power plant opened at the upstream end of the island. At the same time a new and more natural fish pass stream was constructed, snaking through View Island.

== See also ==
- Islands in the River Thames
- List of parks and open spaces in Reading, Berkshire

Next island upstream	River Thames	Next island downstream
De Bohun Island	View Island	Sonning Eye
