= Reading Hydro =

Hydroelectric power station in Reading, England

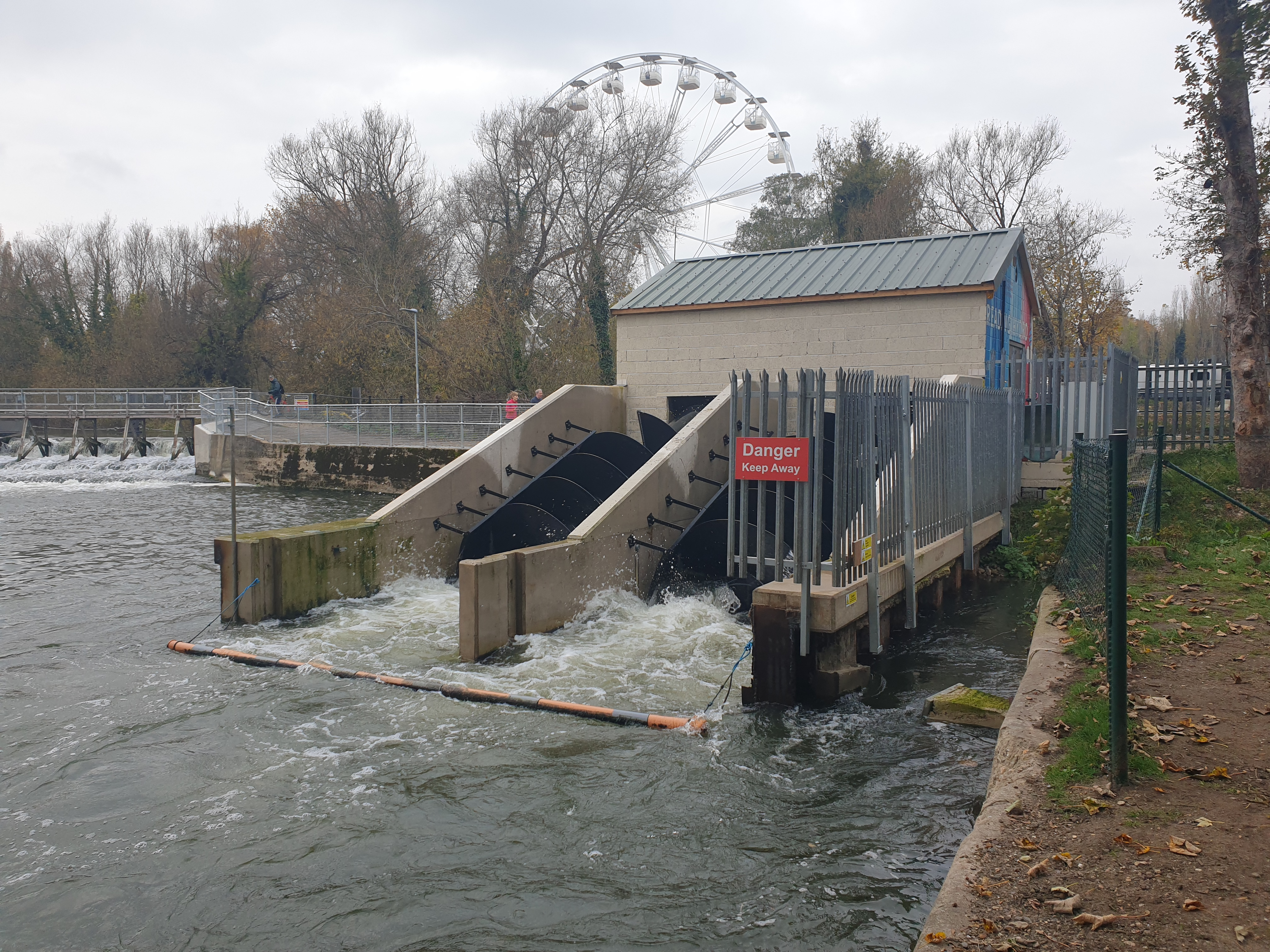
- Reading Hydro with its twin Archimedes screws in operation
- Country: England
- Location: Reading, Berkshire
- Coordinates: 51.46148°N 0.96486°W
- Status: Operational
- Commission date: 13 August 2021
- Owner: Reading Hydro CBS
- Operator: Reading Hydro CBS

Power generation
- Nameplate capacity: 46 kW

External links
- Website: https://readinghydro.org/
- Commons: Related media on Commons

Reading Hydro is a run of the river micro hydroelectric scheme in Reading, England. It is located on the River Thames, at the upstream end of View Island and using the head of water provided by the weir at Caversham Lock. With a drop of about 1.4 metres (4 ft 7 in) and an average water flow of 37 cubic metres (1,300 cu ft) per second, it can generate 46 kilowatts (62 hp) of electricity with its twin archimedes screw turbines.

The scheme is owned and operated by the Reading Hydro CBS, a community benefit society that was founded in 2017, after some years of preparation. By 2018, planning permission had been granted and construction plans developed. Investment was raised through share offers to the local community, and the scheme was officially opened on 13 August 2021.

The turbine house has been decorated on two sides with a mural by Commando Jugendstil, entitled Community Energym, and representing the Reading Hydro community and the sustainable power the project will generate. A third side contains a rendition of Warming Stripes, a visual representations of the change in global temperature over the past 100+ years originally created by Professor Ed Hawkins of Reading University.

Although the weir already had a fish pass, this was found to be too steep for many species of fish. As part of the approvals process for the hydro scheme, a new fish pass has been constructed on View Island in the form of a stream that crosses the island on a more natural sinuous course. Both the turbine house and the fish pass are readily accessible by the public footpath, locally known as The Clappers, that crosses over both the lock and weir, and gives access to View Island.

== Gallery ==
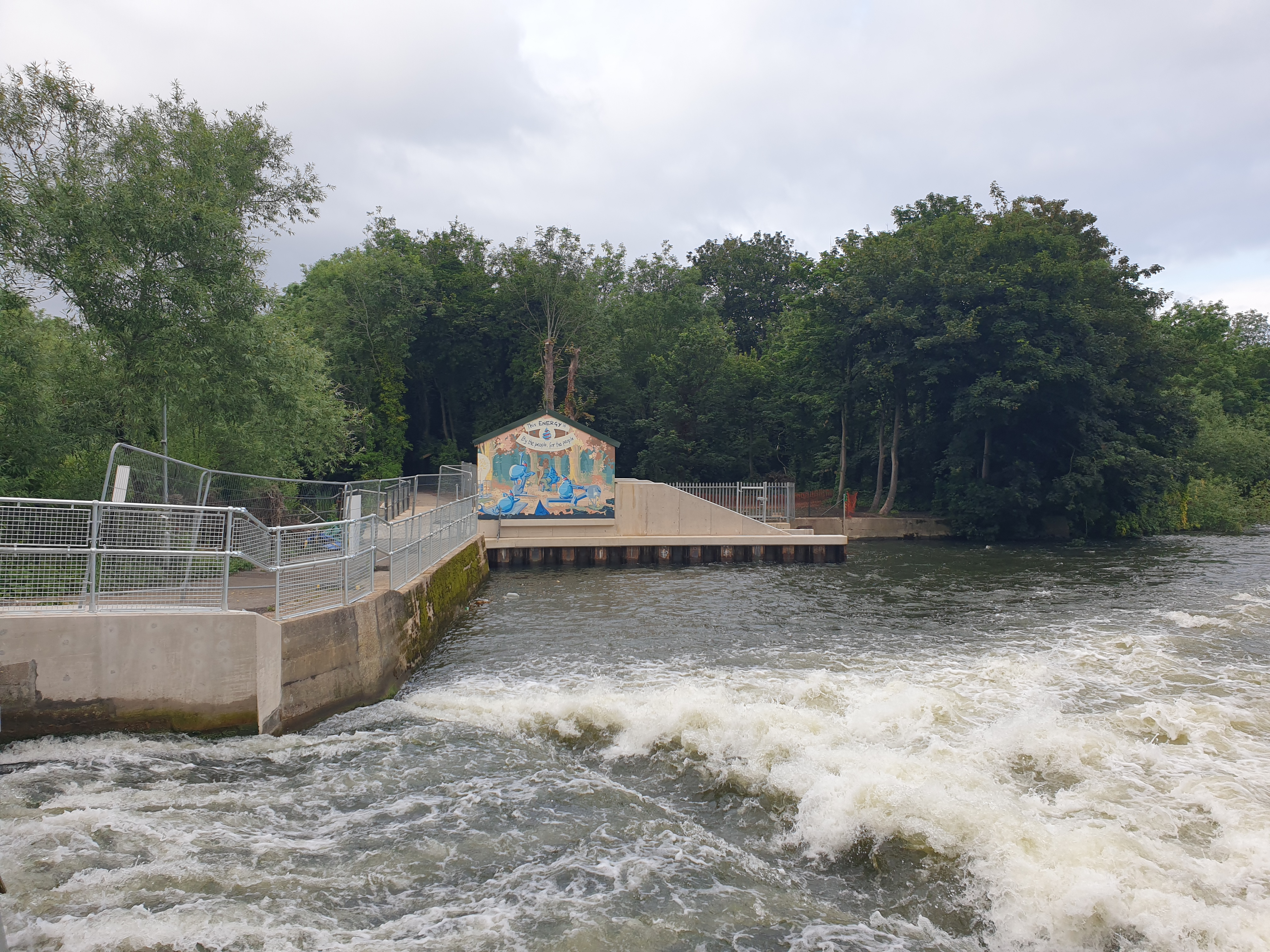
Seen from the weir

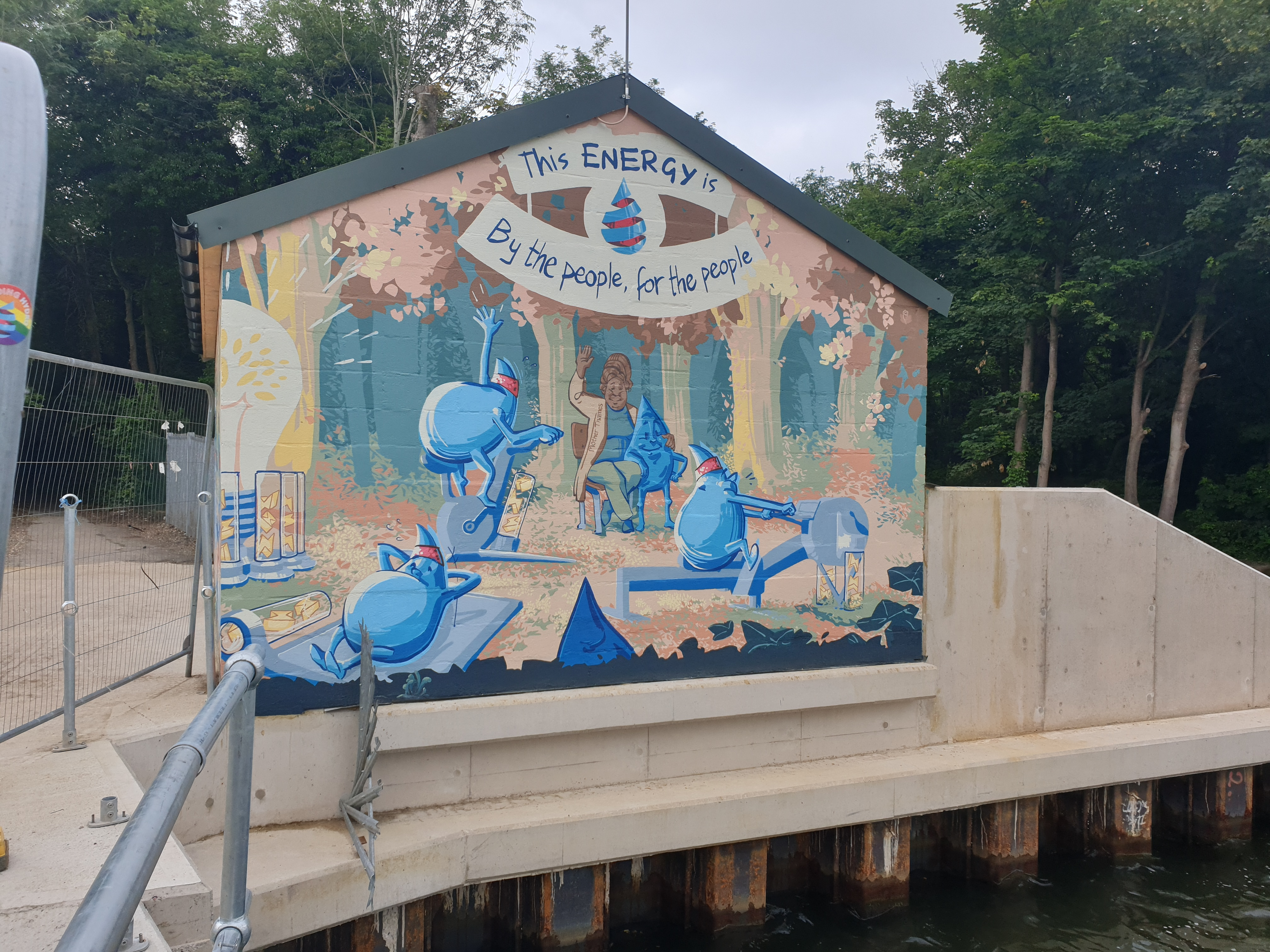
Close up on the mural

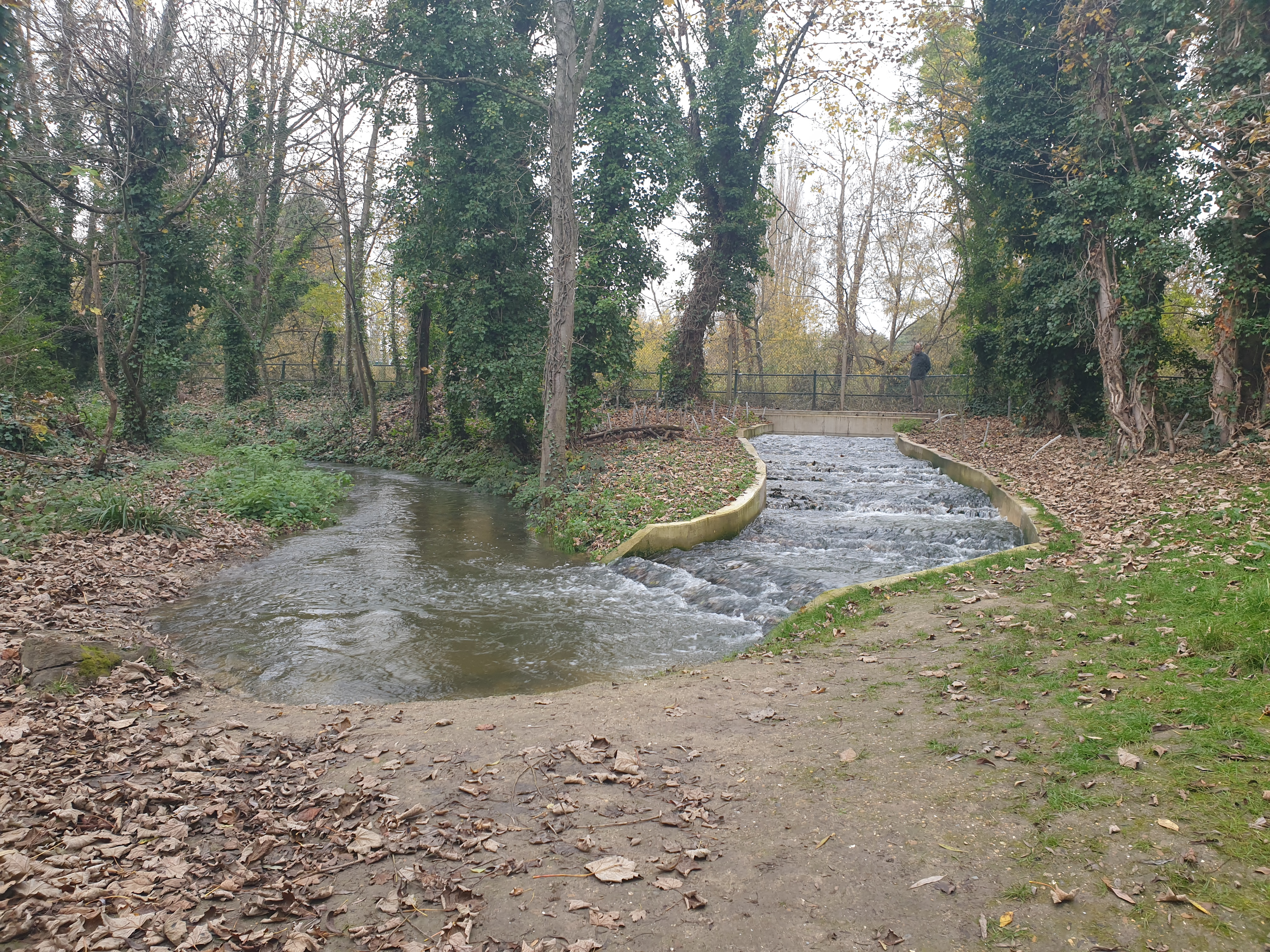
The new fish pass stream
