= Lower Caversham =

Area of Caversham, Berkshire, England

Coordinates: 51.464916°N 0.959587°W

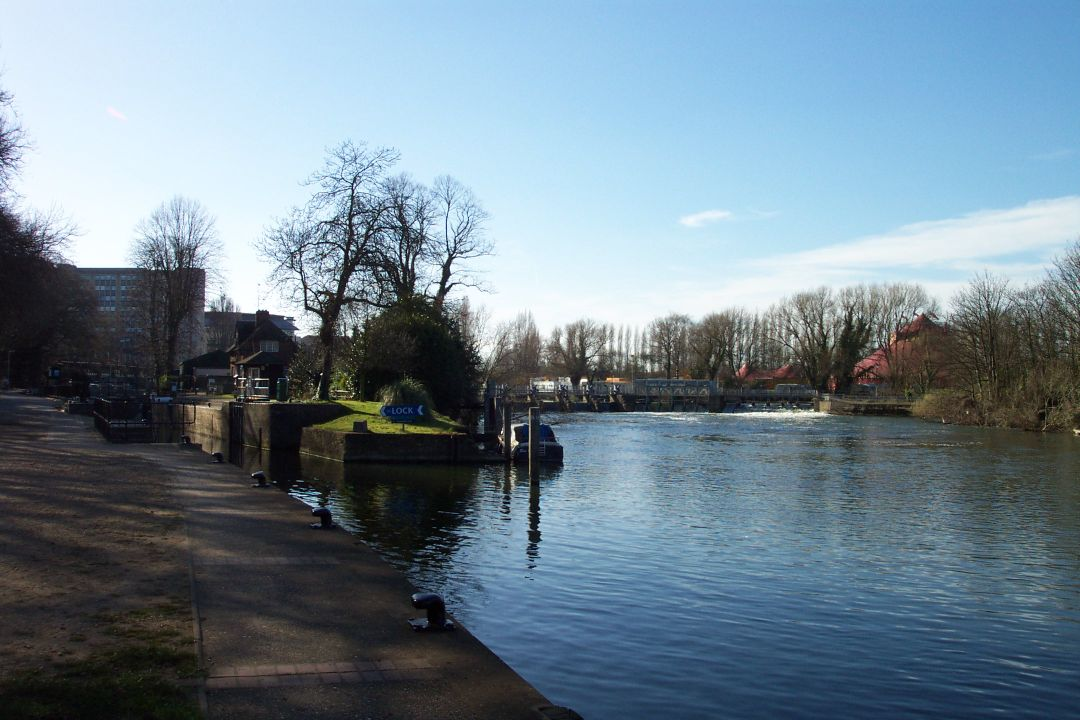
- Caversham Lock

- Location within Berkshire
- OS grid reference: SU722745
- Unitary authority: Reading
- Ceremonial county: Berkshire
- Region: South East
- Country: England
- Sovereign state: United Kingdom
- Post town: READING
- Postcode district: RG4
- Dialling code: 0118
- Police: Thames Valley
- Fire: Royal Berkshire
- Ambulance: South Central
- UK Parliament: Reading East

Lower Caversham is an area of Caversham in Berkshire, England. It forms part of Reading. Lower Caversham has no formal boundaries, but the name usually refers to that part of Caversham situated on lower ground to the east of central Caversham, close to the River Thames.

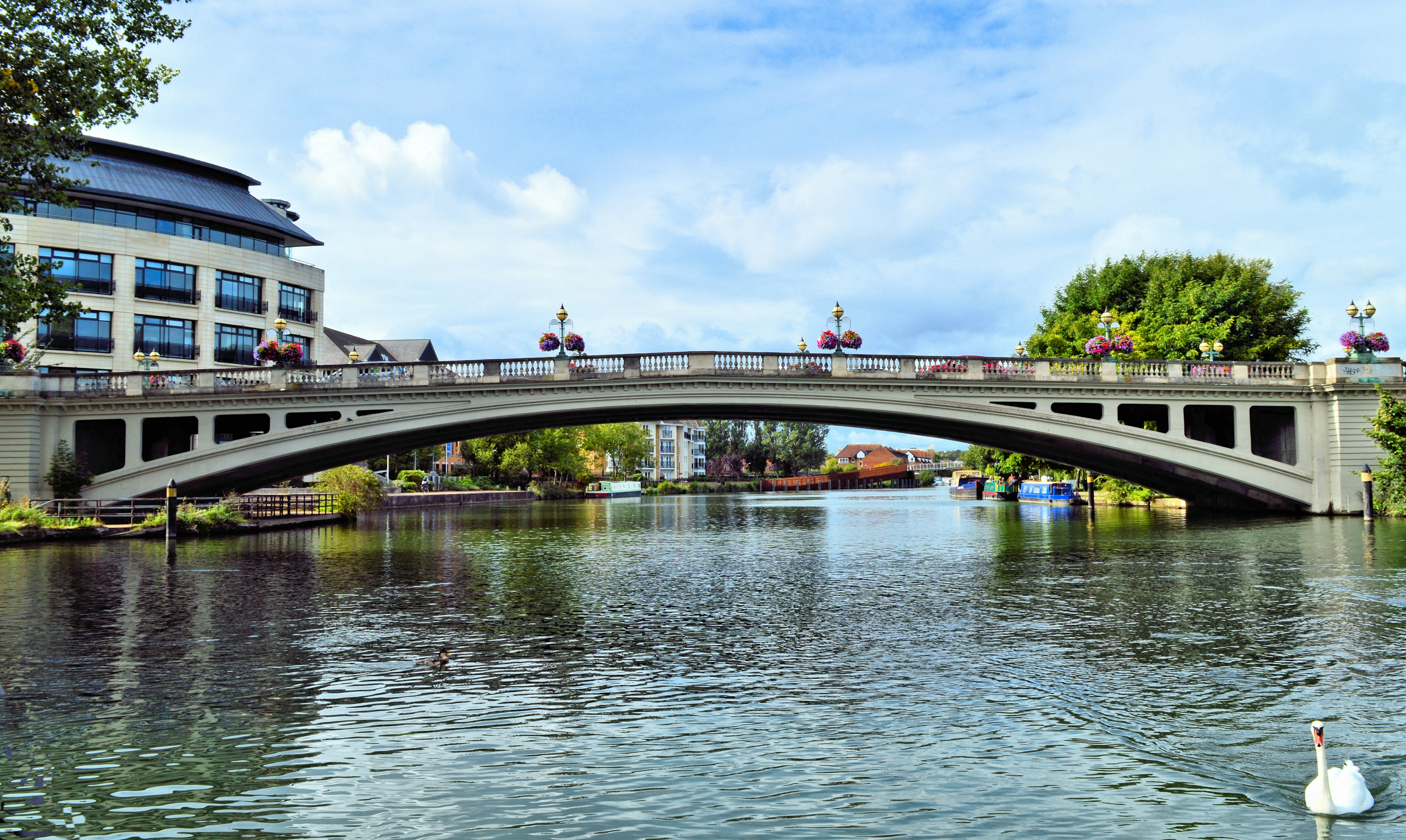
Reading Bridge across the River Thames

Lower Caversham encompasses George Street on which Reading Bridge is situated. This road crosses over the River Thames and is the main link between Caversham and the rest of Reading, leading directly to Reading station. To the east of George Street is also Hills Meadow where the annual Reading Winter Wonderland fair is held.

Caversham Lock is situated on the south bank of the Thames, and is connected to Lower Caversham by a weir—popularly known as The Clappers— which carries a public footpath across the river. This path also provides access to View Island, now a public park. Upstream of the lock, Reading Bridge provides a direct road link between Reading town centre and Lower Caversham.

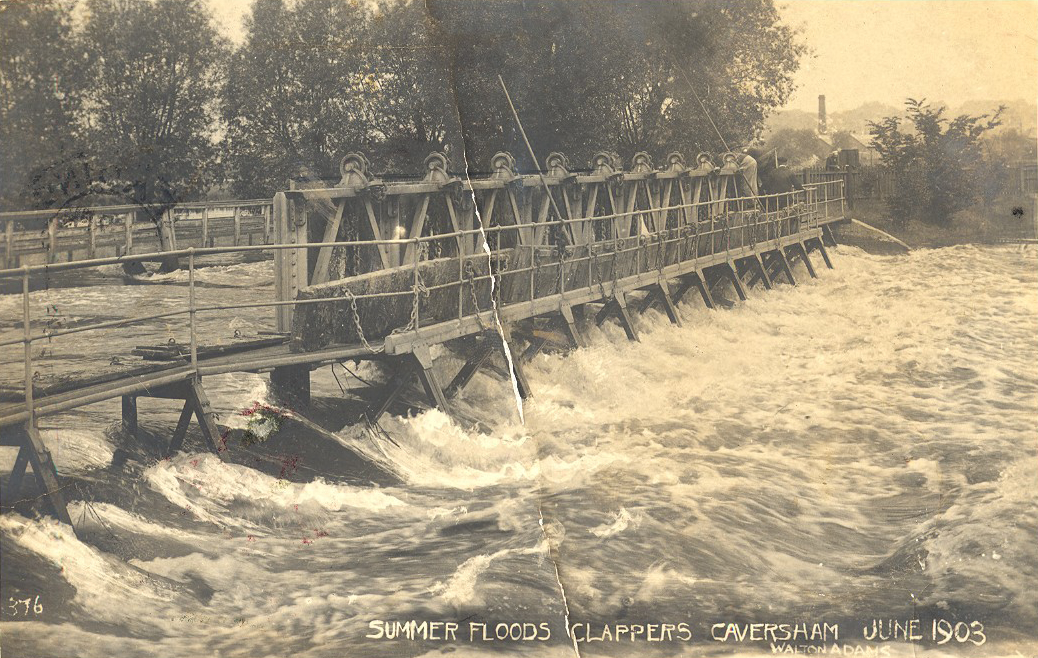
"The Clappers" 1903

== Government ==
The neighbourhood of Lower Caversham forms part of the Borough of Reading, administered by Reading Borough Council. It is split between Thames ward, which includes everything to the river side of Gosbrook Road, and Caversham ward, which includes the rest of the neighbourhood. The whole of the neighbourhood lies within the Reading Central parliamentary constituency.
