= Coley Recreation Ground =

Public park in Reading, England

- Coley Rec
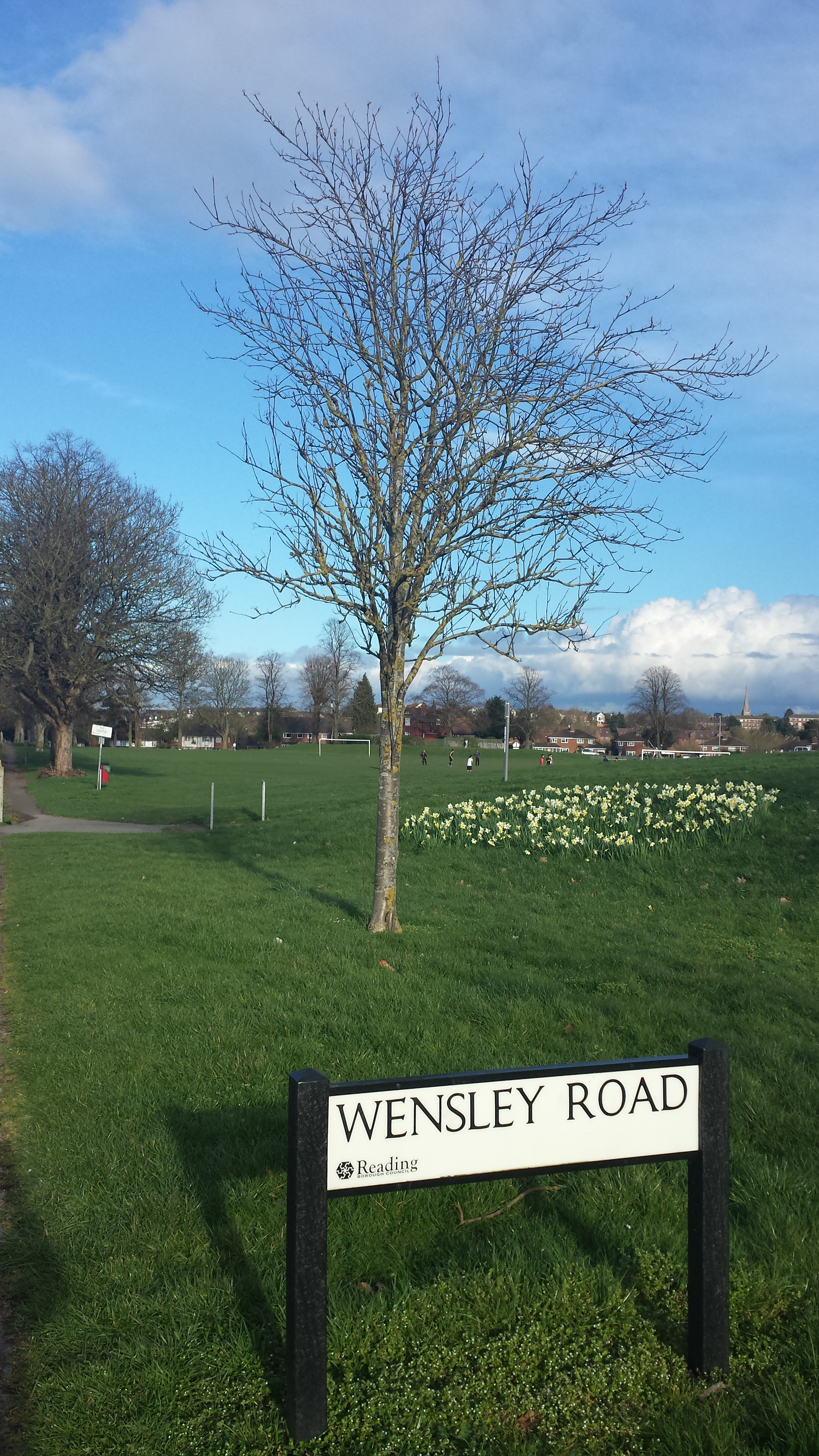

- Location within Reading, Berkshire
- Interactive map of Coley Recreation Ground
- Type: Public park
- Location: Coley Park, Reading, UK
- Coordinates: 51°26′45″N 0°58′48″W

Coley Recreation Ground, often simply known as Coley Rec, is a medium-sized public park in the Coley Park suburb of the town of Reading in the English county of Berkshire. The park comprises formal open parkland, with a children's play area and football, basketball, tennis and cricket pitches. There are perimeter trees, and a undulating banked section on the western end.

The site now occupied by the recreation ground was originally used by Coley Kilns, a brick, tile and pottery works. The area was dug out for clay, leaving the higher ground at the west. The kilns closed in the 1880s and the area was levelled to make way for the new recreation ground. The ground was home to Reading F.C. for part of the period between 1878, when they moved from Reading Recreation Ground, and 1896, when they moved to the purpose-built Elm Park stadium.

== See also ==
- List of parks and open spaces in Reading, Berkshire
