= Christchurch Bridge =

Bridge in Reading, Berkshire, England

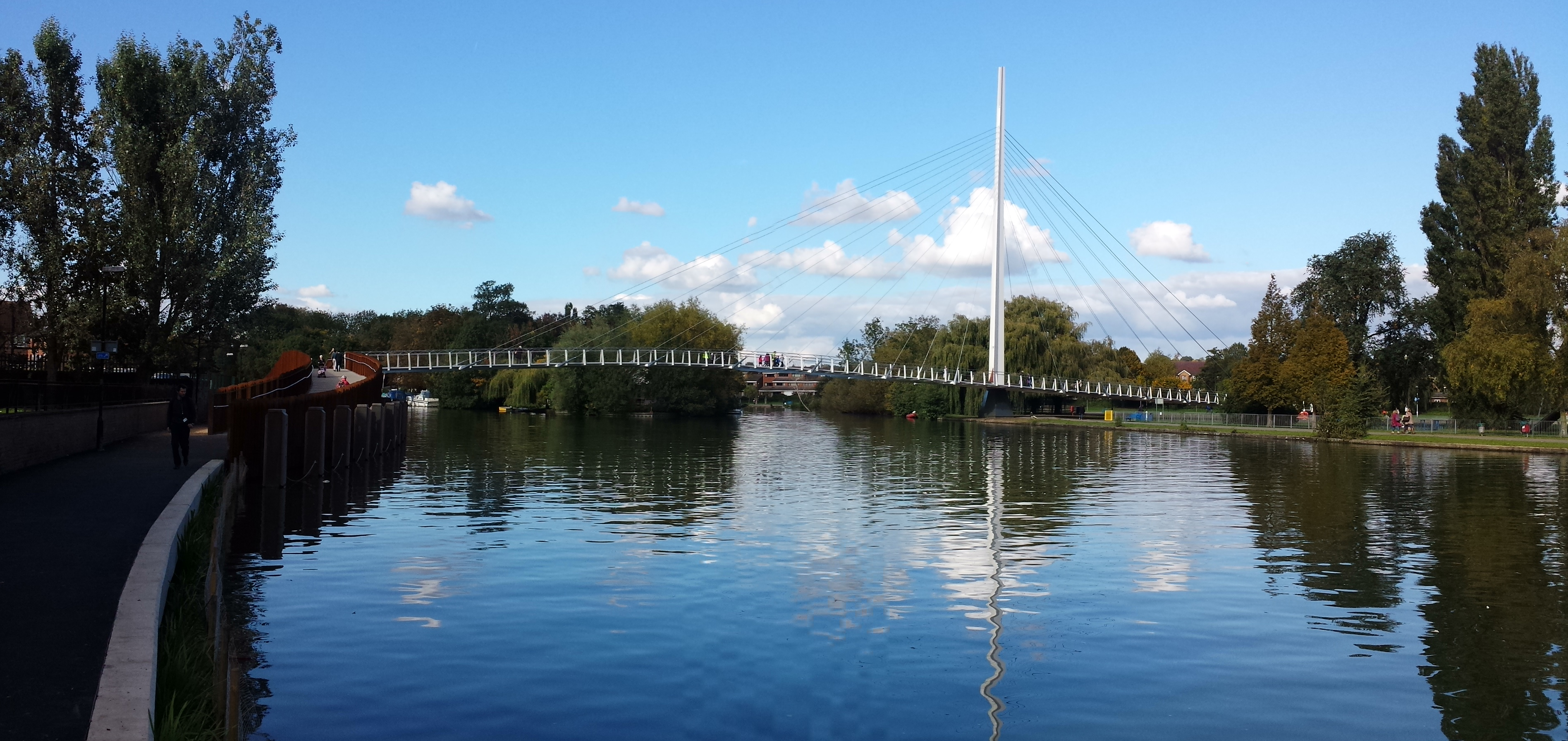
- Christchurch Bridge seen from close to Reading Bridge
- Coordinates: 51.462115°N 0.970251°W
- Crosses: River Thames
- Locale: Reading

Characteristics
- Design: Cable-stayed
- Total length: 68 m (223 ft)
- Width: 3.5 m (11 ft) - 6.75 m (22.1 ft)
- No. of spans: 1

History
- Designer: James Skilton
- Opened: 30 September 2015

Christchurch Bridge, originally known as the Reading Pedestrian and Cycle Bridge, is a pedestrian and cycle bridge over the River Thames at Reading in the English county of Berkshire. The bridge links the centre of Reading on the south bank with the cross-river suburb, and former village, of Caversham on the north bank. It crosses the river some 200 metres (660 ft) above Reading Bridge, and immediately downstream of Fry's Island.

== Design ==
The bridge was designed by Design Engine Architects in collaboration with engineers Peter Brett Associates, and opened on 30 September 2015. The bridge won a commendation in the 2016 Civic Trust Awards.

The cable-stayed bridge has a 68-metre-long (223 ft) river span, which is supported by 14 pairs of cables from a 39-metre-high (128 ft) mast that is asymmetrically placed on the north bank of the river. The walkway ranges in width from 3.5 metres (11 ft) to 6.75 metres (22.1 ft) and divides to pass either side of the mast. The walkway and mast are illuminated by 234 LED lights, of which 39 can be programmed to change colour.

== Name ==
The original bridge name was a working name, and Reading Borough Council held a competition for a permanent name. The new name was confirmed as Christchurch Bridge at a council meeting on 22 March 2015. The name relates to Christchurch Meadows, the bridge's landing point in Caversham, which in turn is named after Christ Church in Oxford, whose dean owned 25 acres (10 ha) of farmland in Reading. The name also reflects more recent links between Reading and Christ Church, which was involved in the foundation of the University of Reading.

== Gallery ==
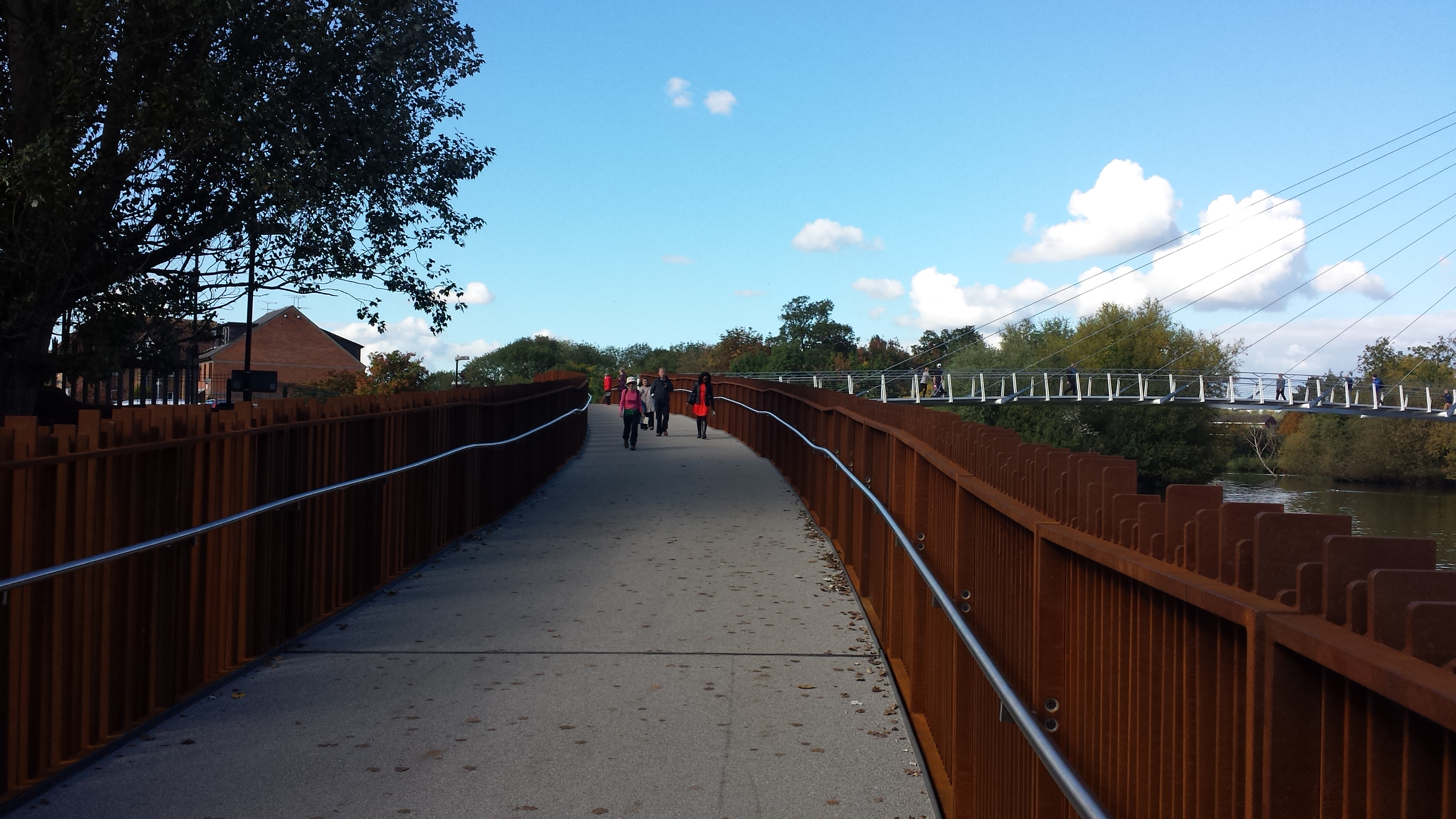
The southern ramp

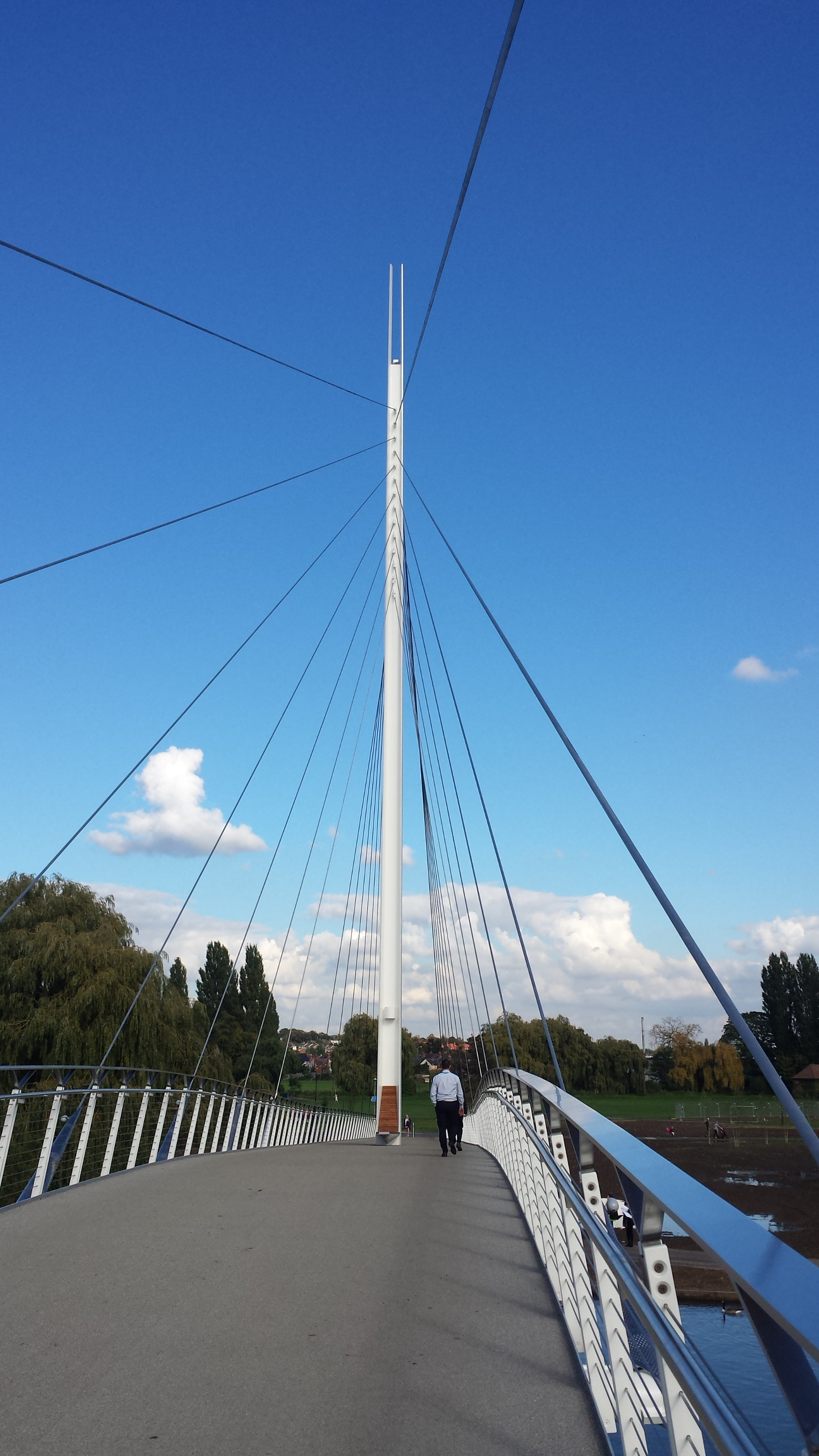
Walkway and mast

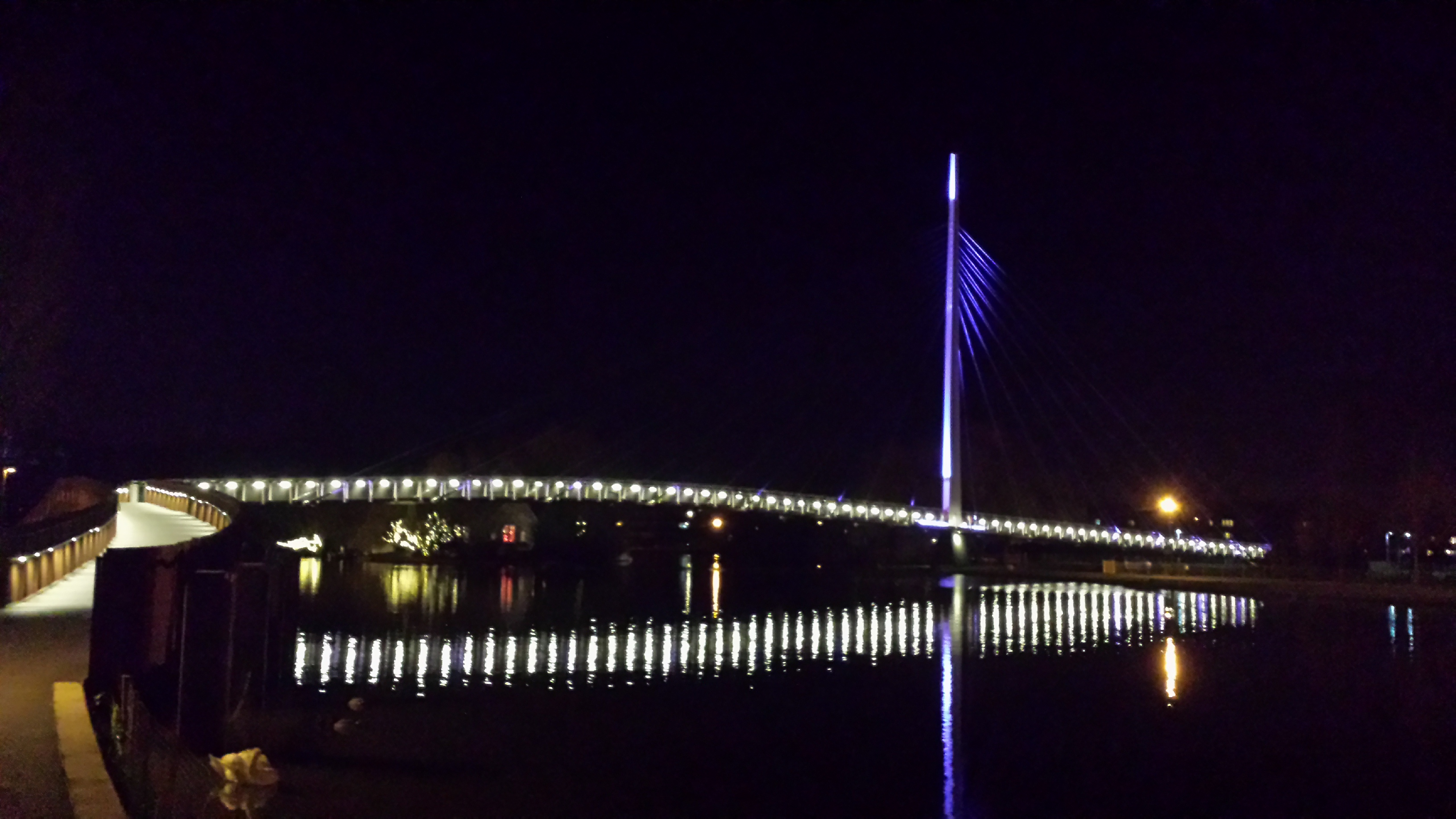
The bridge by night

== See also ==
- List of crossings of the River Thames

Next bridge upstream	River Thames	Next bridge downstream
Caversham Bridge	Christchurch Bridge; Grid reference SU715742	Reading Bridge
