= Thameside Promenade =

Riverside park in Reading, England

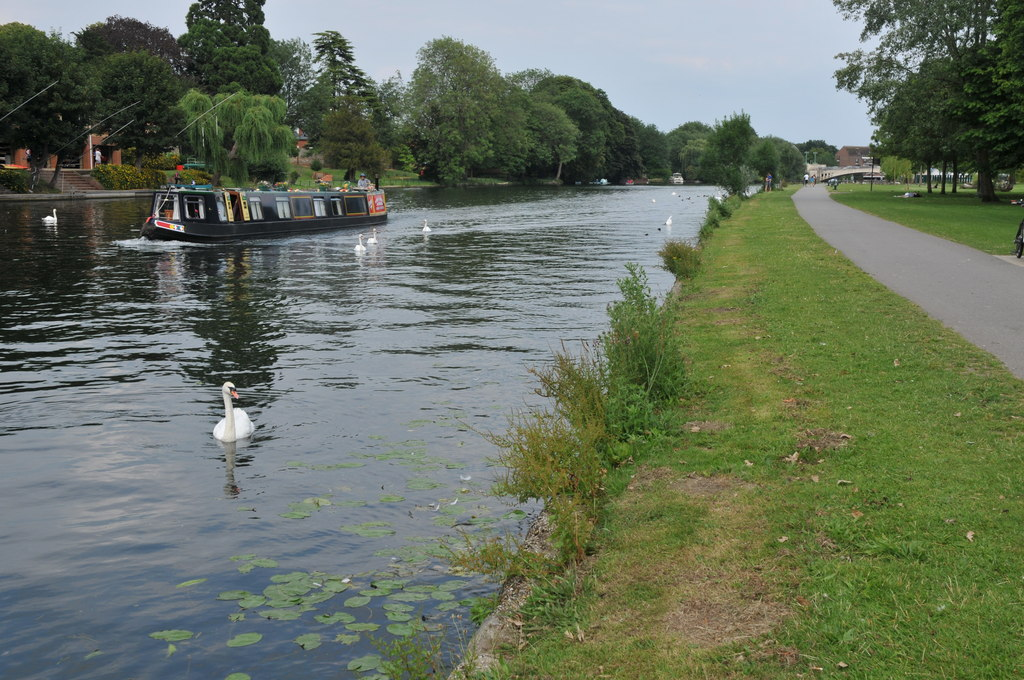
- Thames Side Promenade looking downstream

- Location within Reading, Berkshire
- Type: Public
- Location: Reading, Berkshire, UK
- Coordinates: 51°28′04″N 0°59′14″W

Thameside Promenade, or Thames Side Promenade, is a public park and promenade in Reading, Berkshire, England, located next to the River Thames. It stretches for some 1.4 kilometres (0.87 mi) along the south (Reading) side of the river, to the west of Caversham Bridge, and forms part of the Thames Path long distance footpath. The park includes grassland behind the promenade.

== History ==
Prior to the construction of the promenade, there was simply a towpath through fields alongside the river, much as still exists between the end of the promenade and Scours Lane. In 1905, Reading Borough Council resolved to acquire land for a Thames Side Improvement Scheme and by 1907 this had been achieved. By 1908 the land had been fenced off and the promenade path laid out. In 1909 the scheme was renamed the Thames Side Promenade.

A miniature railway operated in the area from 1944 to 1945, and again from 1949 to 1954. The two lines were both created by Harold Judd, a local timber merchant and haulier, on different alignments. The first operated on the fields immediately to the south of the promenade itself, whilst the second operated along the promenade itself.

== Location ==
The principal access to Thameside Promenade is from the eastern (Caversham Bridge) end, where there is a car park and Reading Rowing Club have their boathouse. A little further along, access is possible from Rivermead Leisure Centre, which occupies a site on the grassland behind the promenade. About half-way along the promenade it is intersected by Cow Lane, and beyond that point the farmland behind the promenade is used as part of the Reading Festival site.

In contrast to the relatively flat land on the promenade side of the river, the land on the opposite bank rises steeply into Caversham Heights, and the path provides good views of Caversham Court, St Peter's Church, the up-market riverside housing along the Warren, and the hills beyond.

Thameside Promenade forms part of a series of riverside open spaces, managed by Reading Borough Council, that stretch along one or other side of the River Thames throughout its passage through Reading. From west to east these are Thameside Promenade, Caversham Court, Christchurch Meadows, Hills Meadow, View Island and King's Meadow.

== See also ==
- List of parks and open spaces in Reading, Berkshire
