= Reading Pride =

Annual LGBT event in Reading, England

- Frequency: Annually
- Locations: Reading, Berkshire, England
- Founded: 2003; 23 years ago
- Website: readingpride.co.uk

Reading Pride is an annual LGBTQ event held in Reading, Berkshire, England that serves Reading and the Thames Valley. Founded in 2003 and hosting its first event in 2004, it became a registered charity in 2007, introducing a parade that year. It is usually based in King's Meadow.

== History ==
=== 2003–2009: Founding and first events ===
Reading Pride was formed in 2003. Lorna McArdle was one of its founders; she later stated that "we didn't know who would turn up, we just knew that Reading Pride would be a really good thing for Reading to have." For the first event in 2004, its organisers were invited to outline their plans to Mayor of Reading Richard Stainthorp, who was praised by the Reading Pride planning committee for showing acceptance of the community. Drag queen Sue Panover – an Anne Robinson lookalike – was scheduled to launch the debut event, at which four gay couples were expected to take part in commitment ceremonies. This first event took place on 4 September 2004, and attracted 6,000 people.

Organisers estimated a record of 10,000 to 15,000 people to have attended that year. In 2007, Reading Pride became a registered charity, and the event that year on 8 September included a parade for the first time, through the town centre.

For the 2009 parade scheduled for 5 September, 15,000 people were expected to attend during the day and evening. Police warned organisers of Reading Pride that the National Front had sought permission to protest the event. A statement from Reading Pride confirmed that the parade would go ahead and said that it "value[d] all opinions both culturally and politically", that it was "more than happy to open dialogue with any group and hope that we could learn from each other," and that it "hope[d] that the National Front's protests [would] allow the parade to pass through the town without incident." The National Front backtracked on the protest a day before the parade. 12,000 people attended the event.

=== 2010s ===
The 2010 event on 4 September included performances from Agnes and former Eurovision Song Contest contenders Scooch. Labour Party MP Diane Abbott appeared and was appointed as Reading Pride's first patron. Attendance was thought to be the event's largest thus far by organisers. Thousands again attended the 2011 event on 3 September. As chairwoman of the charity, McArdle was chosen to carry the Olympic flame for the 2012 Summer Olympics in London. That year, the Reading Pride event on 8 September drew an attendance of over 12,000. The event celebrated its 10th anniversary in 2013, with the festival featuring performances from Hazell Dean as well as drag queens Gina Tonic and Wilma Fingadoo. Drag kings performed; organisers believed that Reading Pride 2013 was the first Pride event in the country to showcase drag kings.

A rainbow-themed Intercity Express Train was launched in 2018 to celebrate pride events across the Great Western Rail network. This was celebrated by a representative for Reading Pride as well as for Pride Cymru and Bristol Pride. In 2019, Reading Pride organised protests outside a new Chick-fil-A establishment in Reading, the first in the country, due to its opposition to same-sex relationships and marriage. Reading Pride said that the chain's "ethos and moral stance goes completely against our values, and that of the UK as we are a progressive country that has legalised same-sex marriage for some years and continues to strive towards equality." Eight days after the Chick-fil-A opened in Reading, the Oracle shopping mall where it was located announced it would not extend the chain’s initial six-month lease. Reading Pride spoke with the Oracle, which announced that it would review its selection process.

=== 2020s ===
The 2020 event was cancelled due to the COVID-19 pandemic, and it returned in 2021 on 4 September, expecting an attendance of 10,000 people. Reading Pride 2022, on 4 September, featured performers Nadine Coyle, Lolly, and RuPaul's Drag Race UK's Sum Ting Wong, as well as local alt-rock band Elucidate. A record of over 13,000 attended, including the Reading F.C. LGBT+ supporters group.

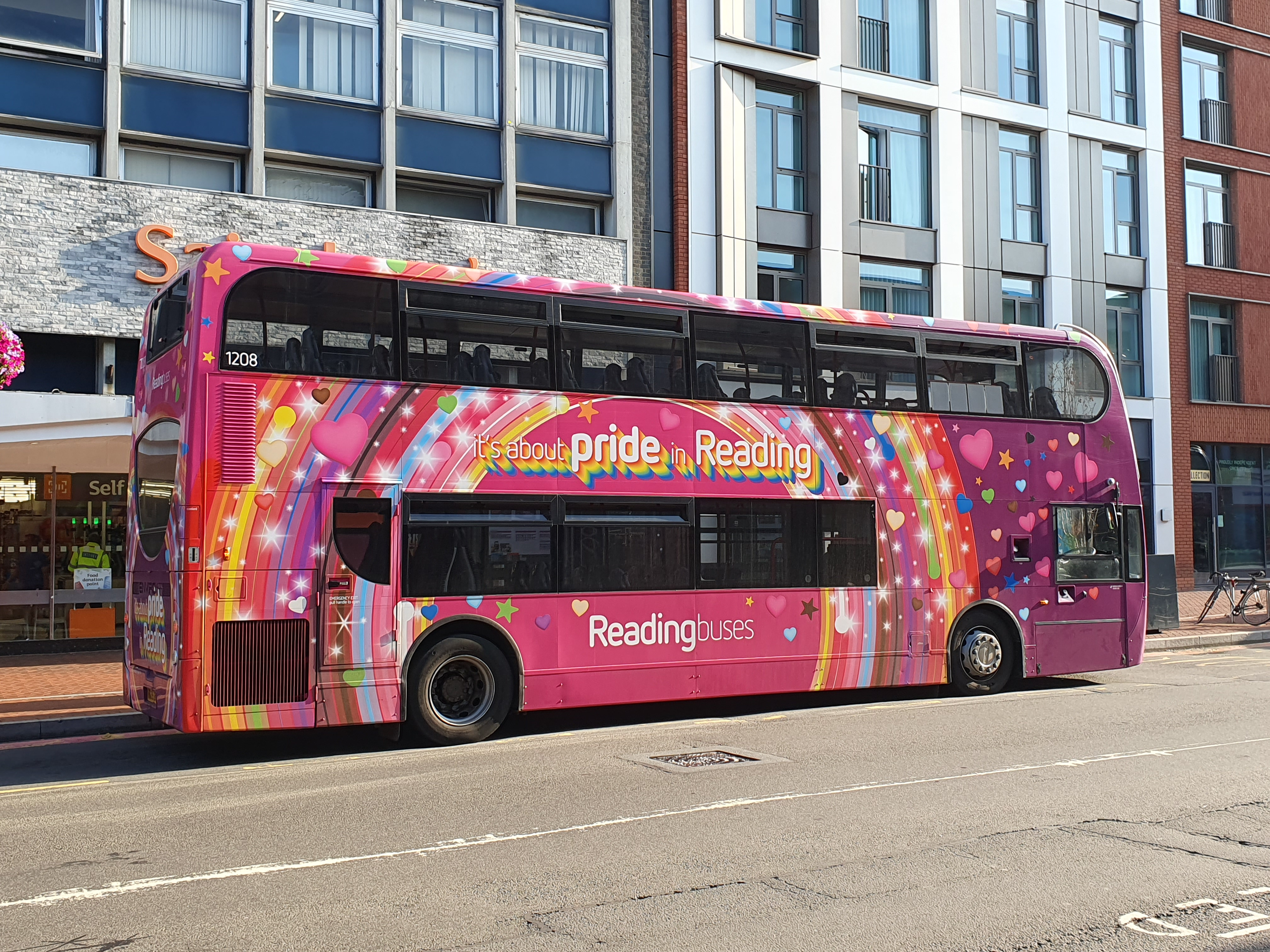
A Reading Pride bus decal in August 2025

In July 2025, organisers of Reading Pride stated that financial support for the charity from local companies had halved, and it had lost two major sponsors, causing the event to experience a £30,000 deficit. The event costs £110,000 to host per year. Organisers asked for donations from the public, as well as volunteers. The parade went ahead on 30 August, and the festival featured singer Jordan Gray, Amrick Channa and the Thames Valley Gay Chorus.
