= Polarite =

Palladium bismuthide mineral

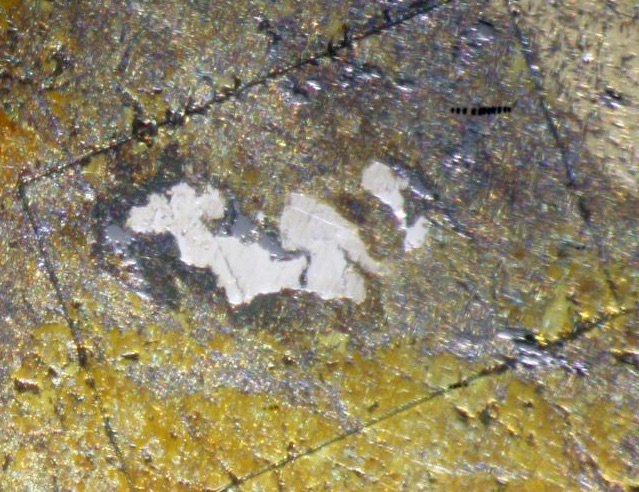

General
- Category: Alloys with PGE
- Formula: Pd,(Bi,Pb)
- IMA symbol: Plr
- Strunz classification: 02.AC.40
- Crystal system: Orthorhombic
- Crystal class: Pyramidal (mm2) (same H-M symbol)
- Space group: Ccm2_{1}
- Unit cell: a = 7.19 Å, b = 8.69 Å, c = 10.68 Å; Z = 16

Identification
- Color: White with yellowish tint
- Crystal habit: Disseminated grains (microscopic)
- Mohs scale hardness: 3.5 - 4
- Luster: Metallic
- Streak: White
- Diaphaneity: Opaque
- Specific gravity: 12.51

Polarite, is an opaque, yellow-white mineral with the chemical formula Pd,(Bi,Pb). Its crystals are orthorhombic pyramidal, but can only be seen through a microscope. It has a metallic luster and leaves a white streak. Polarite is rated 3.5 to 4 on the Mohs Scale.

It was first described in 1969 for an occurrence in Talnakh, Norilsk in the Polar Ural Mountains in Russia. It has also been recorded from the Bushveld igneous complex of South Africa and from Fox Gulch, Goodnews Bay, Alaska.
