= Hay meadow =

Species rich farmland

A hay meadow is an area of land set aside for the production of hay. In Britain hay meadows are typically meadows with high botanical diversity supporting a diverse assemblage of organisms ranging from soil microbes, fungi, arthropods including many insects through to small mammals such as voles and their predators, and up to insectivorous birds and bats.

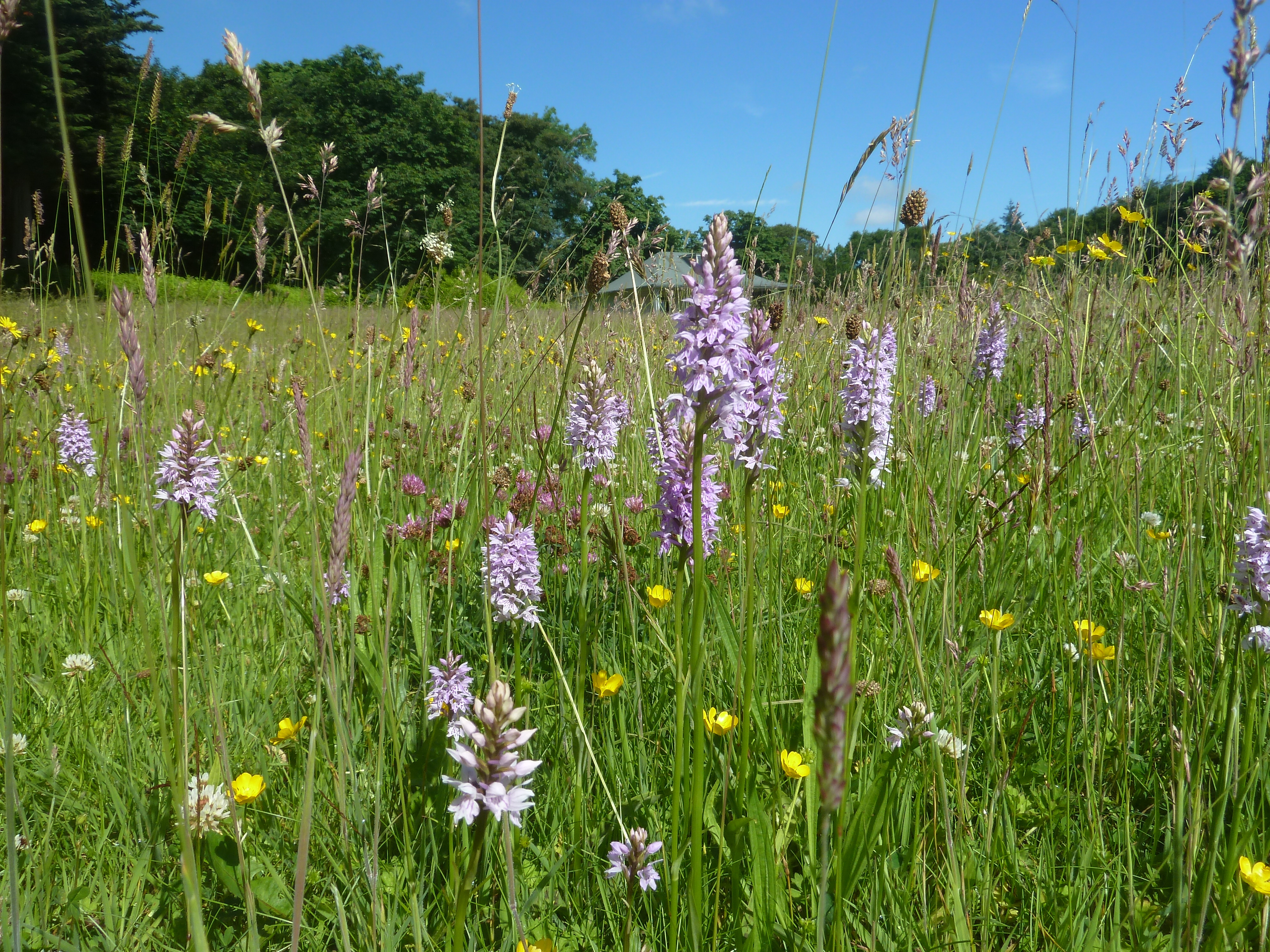
Hay meadow at Plas Newydd Anglesey

== History ==
Up until the turn of the 20th century, most farms in Britain were relatively small and each farm relied on the power of horses for transport and traction including ploughing. Even in the towns and cities, many horses were still in use pulling carriages and carts and delivering milk and bread to the door and Pit ponies were in widespread use in all the coal mining regions.

The onset of war in 1914 required many horses and young men to be deployed in the European battlefields, many of whom never returned. This pattern was repeated in 1939. The two world wars made enormous technological strides in devising mechanised forms of transport which were built on to provide oil powered farm equipment including the ubiquitous tractors.

During the same decades, British governments were strongly encouraging the population to grow more food especially at times when Atlantic convoys of food from the Americas were being lost to enemy torpedo activities.

As a consequence of all these pressures, British farms became steadily larger and abandoned the use of horses in favour of oil fuelled farm machinery. Without the need to feed horses, there was no apparent need to maintain hay-meadows and most were ploughed up and re-sown to provide fodder crops such as mono-culture grass species for silage, brassica or turned over to direct food production such as cereal crops, potatoes or oil-seed rape.

== Types ==
=== Northern hay meadows ===
Northern hay meadows are largely restricted to the northern counties of England including Northumberland, County Durham and Yorkshire with a few in the Scottish border counties.

=== Water meadows ===
Some pastures close to rivers have traditionally been managed as Water meadows. These occur on land that either floods naturally in the wintertime such as those on the River Thames around Oxford or is deliberately flooded using sluices such as those on the Somerset levels. Flooding deposits new nutrient rich sediment on the land but also changes the plant distribution towards those plants that are tolerant of periodic inundation.

=== Lowland meadows and pastures ===
Probably the most frequently encountered, lowland meadows are often relics that have been retained since horses were last used on farms. Their species richness and diversity depend on their ongoing management. This involves the winter grazing, often with sheep and then the land being left until mid-summer when the hay crop is taken. Once growth has re-established the such meadows are often grazed by cattle. The lack of any artificial fertilisers or pesticides allow a very diverse flora to establish in which no one species dominates. The presence of hemi-parasitic plants such as Yellow Rattle and Eye-bright assist in controlling over-growth of grasses. Orchids are common components of these meadow communities and these rely on fungal mycelium in the earth both for germination of orchid seeds but also as part of a commensal relationship with the orchids.
