= Reading Bridge =

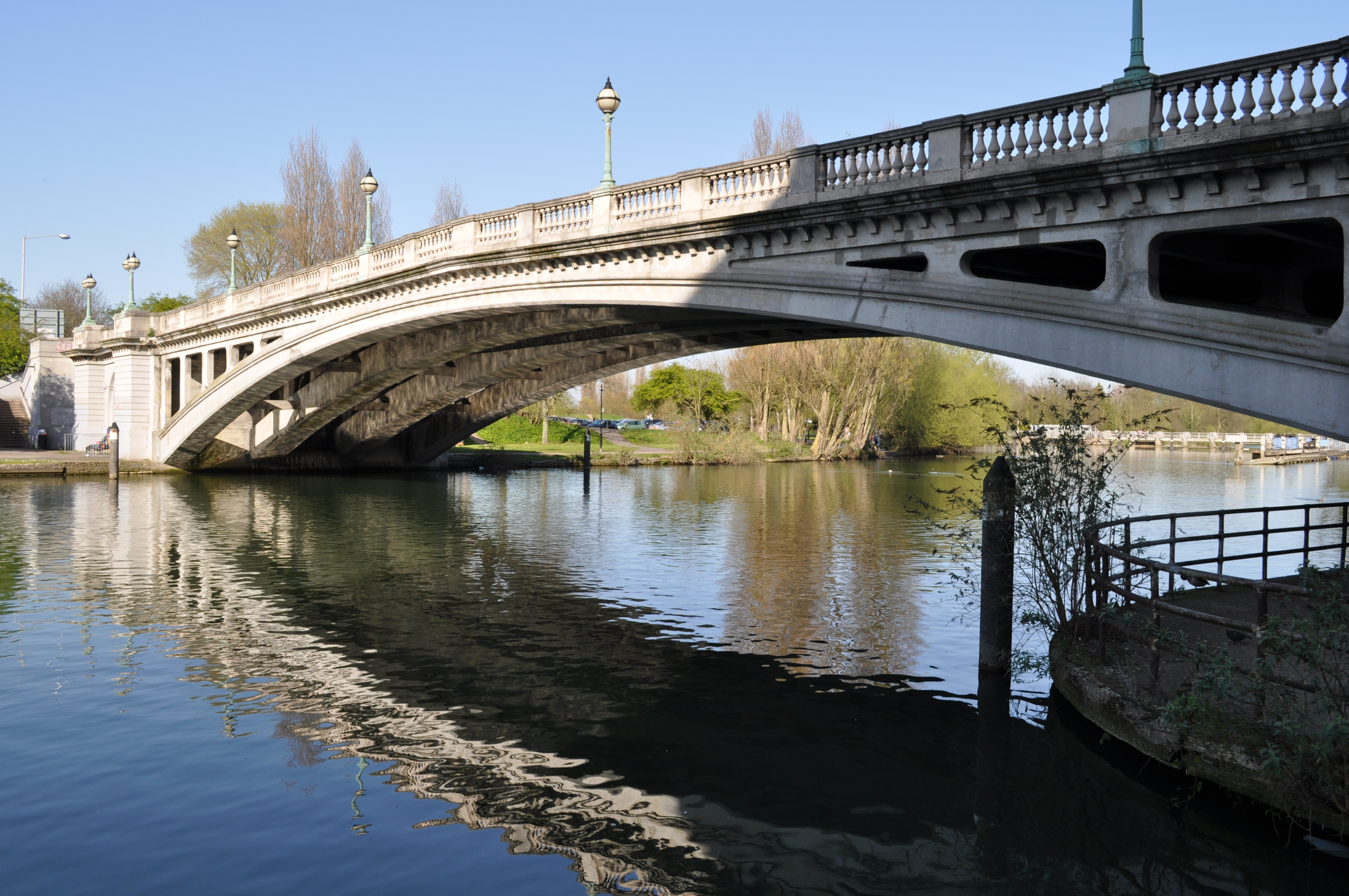
- Reading Bridge viewed from the south bank
- Coordinates: 51°27′39.5″N 0°58′04.5″W
- Carries: B3345
- Crosses: River Thames
- Locale: Reading
- Owner: Reading Borough Council
- Maintained by: Reading Borough Council

Characteristics
- Design: Arch
- Total length: 180 feet (55 m)
- Width: 40 feet (12 m)
- Height: 18 feet (5.5 m)
- No. of spans: 1
- Clearance below: 17 feet 8 inches (5.38 m)

History
- Construction start: March 1922
- Opened: 3 October 1923

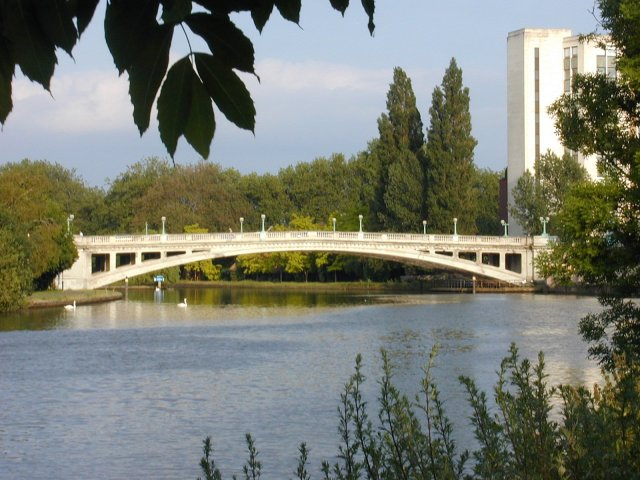
The bridge viewed from upstream

Reading Bridge is a road bridge over the River Thames at Reading in the English county of Berkshire. The bridge links the centre of Reading on the south bank with the Lower Caversham area of the cross-river suburb, and former village, of Caversham on the north bank. It crosses the river a short way above Caversham Lock.

The current bridge is the first on the site, and was opened on 3 October 1923. It has a single reinforced concrete main span of 180 feet (55 m), which was, at the time of construction, the longest such span in the United Kingdom. There are also two side arches for footpaths. The span rises to a height of 18 feet (5.5 m) at the centre, giving a navigation clearance of 17 feet 8 inches (5.38 m). The bridge deck is 40 ft (12 m) wide and carries a 27 ft (8.2 m) wide carriageway and two flanking footways.

== History ==
Before the opening of Reading Bridge, the only road crossing between Reading and Caversham was at the Caversham Bridge site some 0.5 miles (0.80 km) upstream, which has accommodated a series of bridges since around the end of the 12th century. In later years, a narrow footbridge across the top of the weir at Caversham Lock, known locally as The Clappers, provided a supplementary pedestrian route, especially between the terraced housing of Lower Caversham and the factory of Huntley & Palmers, but was becoming increasingly congested.

In 1871, the Corporation of Reading had obtained permission to build a swing bridge across the river just above Caversham Lock, but this was never done. However in 1911, Caversham was absorbed into the borough of Reading, and as part of the 1911 Extension Order (the parliamentary permission for this absorption), the Corporation was required to construct a footbridge between Caversham and De Bohun Road in Reading. The following year the Corporation successfully obtained permission to replace this proposed footbridge with a wider road bridge.

The original plan for the new bridge was for it to be a steel suspension structure, but in 1913 this was revised to an arched bridge built of the, then new, material of reinforced concrete to a design by L. G. Mouchel & Partners. Whilst more expensive than the steel structure, it had the advantage of reduced maintenance costs and resilience to corrosion. It would also confer on Reading a modern landmark in the form of an elegant structure in a new material.

The actual building of the bridge was delayed by the outbreak of the First World War, but the construction contracts were finally let in 1922. The building work, by Holloway Brothers, started in March of that year, and the bridge opened on 3 October 1923. It remained the longest reinforced concrete span in the United Kingdom until 1928.

By 2013 the bridge was carrying 24,000 vehicles each day and was still only one of two road crossing over the Thames in Reading. Reading Borough Council commissioned VolkerLaser to develop a strategy for strengthening the bridge. Voids in the bridge deck and the southern approach ramp were filled with foam concrete, and carbon fibre plates were used to strengthen the structure.

In 2015 the bridge was complemented by the opening of the Christchurch Bridge, a pedestrian and cycle bridge situated some 200 metres (660 ft) upstream.

== See also ==
- Crossings of the River Thames

Next bridge upstream	River Thames	Next bridge downstream
Christchurch Bridge (pedestrian/cycle)	Reading Bridge; Grid reference SU717740	Caversham Lock (pedestrian)
