= Caversham =

Caversham may refer to:

- Caversham, New Zealand, a suburb of Dunedin
- Caversham (New Zealand electorate), an electoral constituency in New Zealand
- Caversham, Reading, in Berkshire, England
- Caversham (Reading ward), an electoral ward
- Caversham, Western Australia, a suburb of Perth

Also

- Caversham AFC, an association football club in New Zealand
- Caversham Airfield, a former Air Force base and motor racing circuit at Caversham in Western Australia
- Caversham Bridge, a bridge across the River Thames in England
- Caversham Court, a public garden and now-demolished mansion located on the north bank of the River Thames in Caversham, on the outskirts of Reading, England
- Caversham International Tennis Tournament, a professional tennis tournament held in Jersey, Channel Islands
- Caversham Lakes, a set of lakes created through gravel extraction between the suburb of Caversham in Reading, Berkshire and the hamlet of Sonning Eye in Oxfordshire, just north of the River Thames
- Caversham Lock, a lock and weir situated on the River Thames in England at Reading, Berkshire
- Caversham Park, a Victorian stately home with parkland in the suburb of Caversham, on the outskirts of Reading, England
- Caversham Park Village, a community in the suburb of Caversham, on the outskirts of Reading, England
- Viscount Caversham, a subsidiary title of the Earl Cadogan
