= Killing of Emily Salvini =

Unsolved Arson Murder

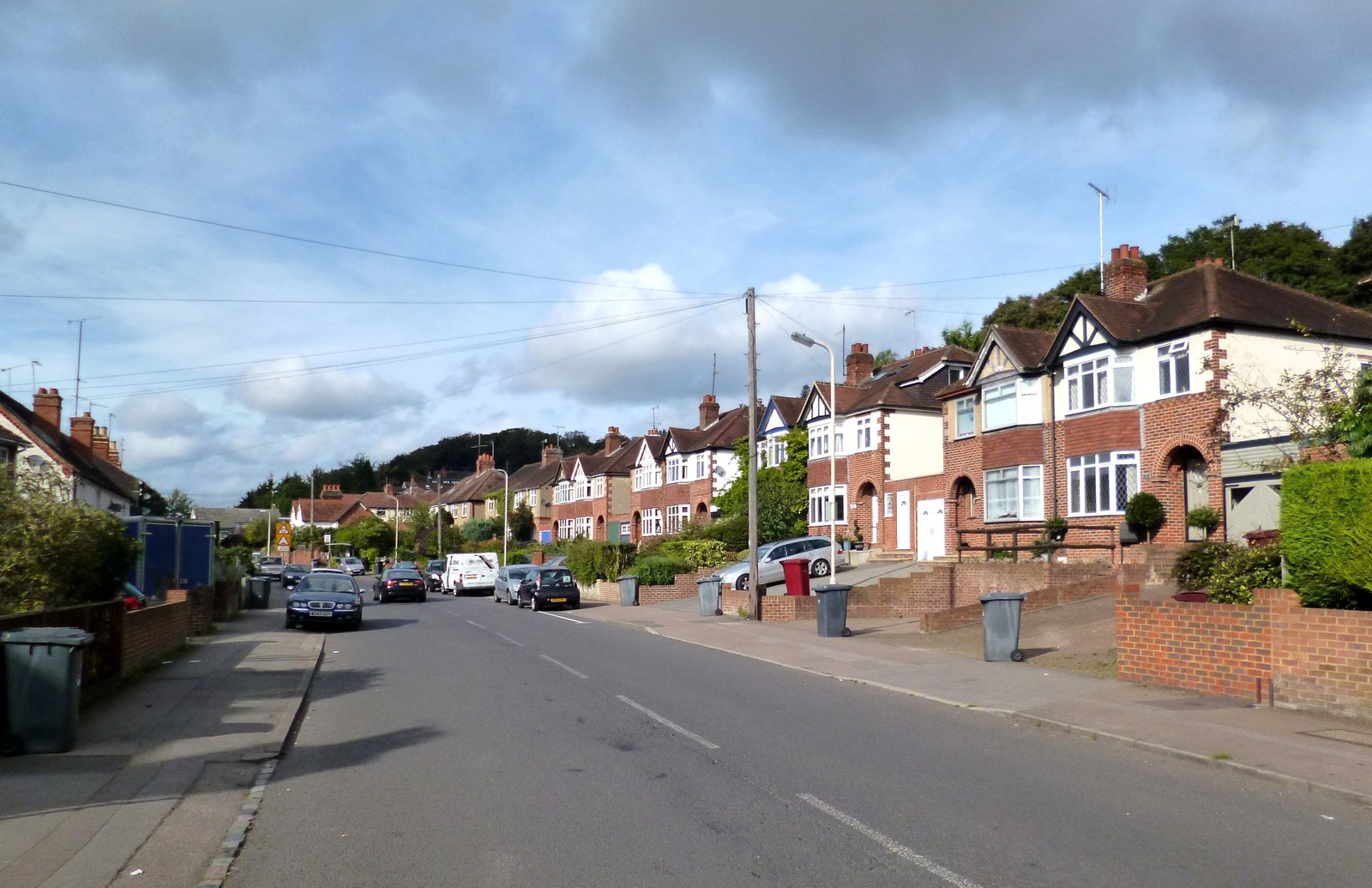
- Hemdean Road in Caversham, where the arson attack took place. The Salvinis' home is just out of shot to the left of this image.
- Date: 3 May 1997
- Time: c.4:00 am
- Location: 270 Hemdean Road, Caversham, Reading; 51.47508°N 0.97460°W
- Cause: Arson

Emily Salvini (31 October 1989 – 3 May 1997) was a seven-year-old girl who was killed in an arson attack in her family home in Reading, Berkshire, in May 1997. The inquest into Salvini's death gave a verdict of unlawful killing, though the perpetrator has never been identified.

== Background ==
Emily Salvini was born in Italy on 31 October 1989 to Katie and Marco Salvini. They were married for about a year before Emily was born and lived near Lake Garda for three years before moving to Caversham in Reading, close to Katie's parents. Emily had a brother, Zach, who was four years younger than her. At the time of the attack on the Salvinis' home, Katie and Marco had separated, and Katie and her two children were the only occupants of the semi-detached rented house on Hemdean Road in Caversham. Katie worked part-time in a local pub, and Marco had regular contact with their children and visited every Saturday at 10:00 am to take the children out. Emily was a pupil at Caversham Primary School.

== Incident ==
At approximately 1:30 am on 3 May 1997, telephone wires on Hemdean Road were severed, causing loss of telephone connection to thirty houses. At around the same time, petrol was poured through the letterbox of the Salvinis' home and set alight.

Katie Salvini was woken by three-year-old Zach, who was co-sleeping with her. She noticed heat and a glow around the bedroom door, and flames entered the bedroom when she opened the door. After putting Zach out of the bedroom window onto the ground floor bay window roof, Katie was unable to reach Emily's bedroom through the fire. Zach was handed down to a neighbour, while Katie fell from the bay window ledge. Members of the public unsuccessfully attempted to enter Emily's room using a ladder. After emergency services arrived, Emily was rescued from the house, and the three were taken to the Royal Berkshire Hospital. Emily died of smoke inhalation, and the severity of Katie and Zach's injuries required a transfer to the specialist unit at Stoke Mandeville Hospital in Buckinghamshire.

Katie and Zach both underwent surgery for their burns. Zach was discharged from hospital after a few weeks, and Katie was discharged a month after the attack.

Emily's funeral was held in Caversham on Thursday 19 June.

== Investigation ==
Police closed off part of Hemdean Road and a mobile incident room was set up in the street. Police interviewed neighbours and searched gardens. Among the items they were looking for was a can of flammable fluid. Two men were arrested and held for questioning over the weekend. They were later released without charge. Katie Salvini had reported to police that her telephone cable had been cut two weeks previously; two men had been questioned then but released without charge.

Four hundred people were interviewed in the first few months of the investigation. Thames Valley Police stated that the "calculated and pre-planned" arson attack was a deliberate attempt to murder Katie Salvini and her children. A few weeks after the attack, police appealed for two men to come forward. A neighbour saw them walking down Hemdean Road and then run back to a blue car at the time of the attack. Both men were described as Asian, with one being in his 20s and the other in his 40s. A man was arrested on 17 June and held overnight before being released without charge.

In July, police issued an unusual artist's impression of a "man without a face", which was based on a description given to them by two witnesses who were not close enough to see his facial features. They saw the man at the junction of Hemdean Road and Victoria Road, yards from the Salvinis' home at 4:40 am, shortly before the fire. He was described as being between 5 feet 8 inches (1.73 m) and 5 feet 11 inches (1.80 m) with short dark hair. He was wearing a padded light lumberjack-style shirt or jacket with a predominantly white chequered pattern.

In August, police cleared an overgrown area at the junction of Hemdean Road and Victoria Road where the "man without a face" had been seen standing. It was the second time the area had been searched and nothing of interest was found. Police searched drains and the Thames for discarded items.

== Legal proceedings ==
On 6 August 1997, police arrested a 33-year-old male and his common-law wife at their home on Cavendish Road, Emmer Green. Forensic tests were carried out on the man's vehicle, and the couple's home was searched. The man had been previously interviewed by detectives and was arrested on suspicion of murder. His partner was arrested on suspicion of aiding and abetting. Both were released without charge. In October 1998, Thames Valley Police stated that the male remained a suspect and would remain so for the foreseeable future.

The inquest into Emily's death on 4 November 1997 gave a verdict of unlawful killing.

In April 1999, almost two years after the attack, Katie Salvini made a plea for help to find her daughter's killer and police stated that they believed someone was shielding him or her.

In 2001, Salvini's killing was featured on the BBC's Crimewatch TV programme. In 2017, on the twentieth anniversary of the attack, Katie and her son Zach, 23, made a new appeal for information to find Emily's killer. She said that she believed there were two 'very strong suspects' who lived locally and who she had come face-to-face with in the years since the attack. She believed that one of them could have held a grudge against her for standing up for a friend. Thames Valley Police said they would be carrying out new forensic tests on fire debris retrieved from the scene of the crime.
