= Russell Norman =

British restaurateur, chef, and author (1965–2023)

- Born: 9 December 1965; London, England
- Died: 23 November 2023 (aged 57); Ashford, Kent, England
- Education: Heathland School
- Alma mater: University of Sunderland
- Occupations: Chef; teacher; author
- Children: 3

Russell Norman (9 December 1965 – 23 November 2023) was a British restaurateur, chef, teacher and author. In the early 2010s, he gained a unique reputation and identity as "the coolest man in food". He co-founded Polpo, a renowned Venetian-style tapas restaurant in London and the Italian restaurant Brutto.

== Early life ==
Russell Norman was born on 9 December 1965 in Perivale, Ealing, West London, one of six sons.

He grew up in the Twickenham suburbs and attended the Heathland School in Hounslow, West London. There, he excelled at drama, and later studied English at the University of Sunderland.

Norman's fondness for Shakespeare came to supersede his interest in sport, to his family's bemusement. Russell portrayed himself as the "black sheep of the family".

== Culinary career ==
After his graduation, he began his career as an arts administrator at Easington District Council. Then he returned to London and commenced work as a barman at Joe Allen and then worked there for several years in various capacities. He subsequently worked as GM at Circus in Soho, and at Zuma in Knightsbridge prior to taking on the role of Operations Director at Caprice Holdings.

Norman's adaptation of the informal American or Italian eatery and hotel atmospheres would shift the British hotel industry paradigm. At the time, British restaurants were highly formal, unlike their foreign competitors. In 2009, Norman and Richard Beatty opened Polpo in Soho, London; the new restaurant introduced novel small plates, loud music, and waiters with tattoos and bed hair. He also refused to accept customer reservations. His unconventional formula soon became the talk of the town, and other London restaurants emulated his ideology. Polpo restaurants operated a discretionary 12.5% service charge, most of it being retained by the restaurant, employees being paid a fixed hourly rate of service charge, regardless of how much service charge was actually received every month.

Norman and Richard Beatty became long-term business partners, opening 17 more restaurants (4 of which in London) and catering to a wide customer range. In 2020, he withdrew from Polpo Group when financial constraints from the UK COVID-19 pandemic response inhibited promised employee pay-outs.. Norman opened Trattoria Brutto, a restaurant inspired by Florentine trattorie with a touch of New York, independently in October 2021.

He often emphasized work-life balance and workplace–micro-management avoidance. He also demonstrated great admiration and appreciation of Italian culture.

== Writings ==
In 2014, he mentored novice and emerging restaurateurs on the BBC Two series The Restaurant Man. He also appeared as a guest cook for a few episodes of the British television series Saturday Kitchen.

His first cookbook, Polpo: A Venetian Cookbook (of Sorts), eventually won the inaugural Waterstones Book of the Year Award in 2012. His second book, Spuntino: Comfort Food, won the Guild of Food Writers Award in 2016. His third book, Venice: Four Seasons of Home Cooking, was published by Fig Tree, and his fourth book, Brutto: A (Simple) Florentine Cookbook, was published in November 2023. He was also briefly a contributing editor to Esquire and to Noble Rot magazine.

== Personal life and death ==
In 2004, Norman married Jules McNally; they had two children, and he had a third from a prior relationship. At the time of his death, he was in a relationship with Genevieve Verdigel, an art historian.

On 18 November 2023, Norman was discovered in cardiac arrest at his home in Pluckley, Kent, after apparently hanging himself. A pulse was recovered when CPR was administered, and he was taken to William Harvey Hospital in Ashford, Kent; however, it was found that he had experienced significant brain damage, and he died on 23 November, aged 57. In February 2024, an inquest found that his death was a suicide by hanging.
