= Emmer Green =

Suburb of Reading, England

Coordinates: 51°28′59″N 0°57′43″W

- Suburb
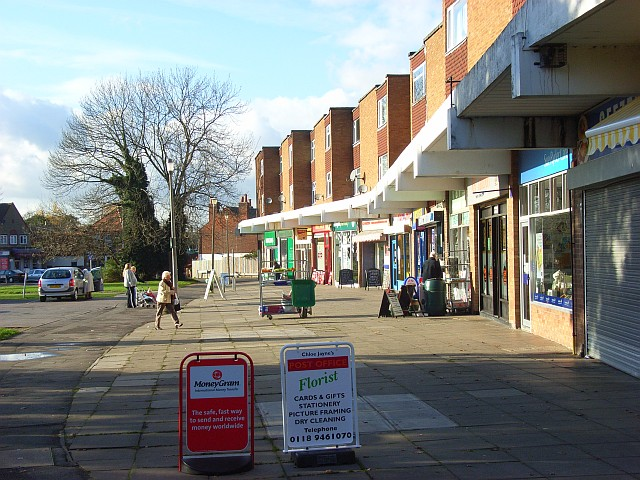
- The Milestone Way shopping parade with public greens in the background.

- Location within Berkshire
- Area: 2.86 km^{2} (1.10 sq mi)
- Population: 7,849 (2011 census)
  - Density: 2,744/km^{2} (7,110/sq mi)
- OS grid reference: SU722769
- Unitary authority: Reading
- Ceremonial county: Berkshire
- Region: South East
- Country: England
- Sovereign state: United Kingdom
- Post town: READING
- Postcode district: RG4
- Dialling code: 0118
- Police: Thames Valley
- Fire: Royal Berkshire
- Ambulance: South Central
- UK Parliament: Reading Central

Emmer Green is the northernmost suburban neighbourhood of Reading in Berkshire, England, and is centred around 2 miles (3.2 km) north of the town centre. It is predominantly a residential area and forms part of Caversham, a village and suburb that was once an independent town on the north bank of the River Thames opposite Reading.

== History ==
Emmer Green was historically a distinct settlement within the ancient parish, and then civil parish, of Caversham, in the county of Oxfordshire. This settlement was clustered around the junctions of the roads now known as Peppard Road, Kidmore End Road and Grove Road. It received its first church in the 1860s. This was replaced by a tin tabernacle in 1897, and by the current St Barnabas Church in 1924. The 1897 building is still used as the church hall.

By the latter part of the 19th century, the south-western part of Caversham parish, nearest to Reading, had become densely built up. In 1894, the rural section of the parish to the north of Emmer Green was split off to form the new parish of Kidmore End, and the remainder of the parish became the urban district of Caversham. In 1911, this was again split, with the built-up section, including Emmer Green, transferred into the borough of Reading and county of Berkshire, whilst the still rural eastern section was transferred to the Oxfordshire parish of Eye and Dunsden.

Emmer Green has five former mansions. Two are now converted for residential use: Rosehill House and Notley Place. Rosehill House, standing in 14 acres of ground, was once part of Caversham Manor, the first building being erected in 1791. Martin John Sutton, of Sutton's Seeds, lived there, the house then being called Kidmore Grange. In 1923 it was bought for the Oratory Preparatory School; then from the outbreak of the last war until 1958 it accommodated part of The Salvation Army's headquarters as staff were evacuated from central London. The house has since been converted into flats and a housing estate built on the grounds. The third, Caversham Park, is owned by the BBC, while Grove House has become Highdown School. Caversham Place was designed by the architect Clough Williams-Ellis for Major-General Sir Cecil Pereira, whose brother The Rev Edward Thomas Pereira was headmaster and benefactor of The Oratory School.

== Geography ==
Caversham forms a suburban conglomeration (continuous area of development) with Emmer Green. Emmer Green is bordered by the extensive nature reserve at Clayfield Copse and Blackhouse Woods and also by the tip of the Chiltern Hills at Bugs Bottom (also known as Hemdean Bottom). There is a cycle path to Wallingford and access to Balmore Walk which overlooks Caversham, with views as far as the Madejski Stadium wind turbine.

Together with Caversham the area is green-buffered by sports fields, agricultural fields or woodland to the north with Rotherfield Peppard and the west with Mapledurham. Altogether the conglomeration forms three wards, i.e. approximately a fifth of the borough of Reading in terms of population however a higher proportion of the land.

== Government ==
The neighbourhood of Emmer Green forms part of the Borough of Reading, administered by Reading Borough Council. It is split between Emmer Green ward, which contains most of the neighbourhood, and Caversham Heights ward, which contains the western-most section, around Highdown School. Emmer Green ward also includes Caversham Park Village and housing on both sides of the Henley Road that are not normally considered part of the Emmer Green neighbourhood. The whole of the neighbourhood lies within the Reading Central parliamentary constituency.

== Education ==
There are two primary schools, Emmer Green Primary School and The Hill Primary which is situated between Emmer Green and Caversham, and the comprehensive Highdown School and Sixth Form Centre which was rated as outstanding by Ofsted in 2010.

== Chalk mining ==
There is at least one disused chalk mine in Emmer Green, sometimes known as the Hanover Chalk Mine, with its principal access located at the junction of Peppard Road and Kiln Road.

== Transport ==
It is served by two principal bus routes and two school service routes. The 24 route runs from Central Reading and serves a circular route round Caversham Park and the eastern part of Emmer Green. The 25 and 25a route runs from Central Reading to Peppard Common (25) and Sonning Common (25a) in South Oxfordshire. Routes 80 and 84 operate links to Reading School and Chiltern Edge School respectively.

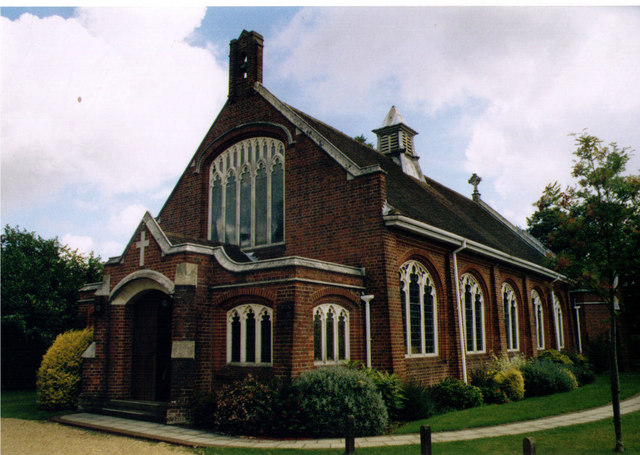
St Barnabas Church.

== Religion ==
St Barnabas Church is the local Church of England parish church. The present building was consecrated on 29 June 1929 and the previous nineteenth century church is still in use as a village hall.

== Sport ==
- Football: Caversham AFC – Football recreation ground, Emmer Green FC
- Rugby: Abbey RFC – Rugby Union playing ground, Peppard Road
- Tennis: Caversham Park Tennis Club – Clayfield Copse.

== Demography ==
2011 Census Key Statistics
Output area	Population	Homes	% Owned outright	% Owned with a loan	% Socially rented	% Privately rented	km^{2}	km^{2} Greenspace (Note: Comprises cultivated fields, woodland, pasture and public parks/common.)	km^{2} gardens	km^{2} road and rail
Emmer Green (Note: Approximates to Peppard Ward less Reading 001C as there are no official boundaries.)	7849	3288	39.9%	40.1%	5.8%	9.1%	2.86	1.1	1.0	0.29

== Notes and references ==
Notes
