= St Peter's Church, Caversham =

St Peter's Church
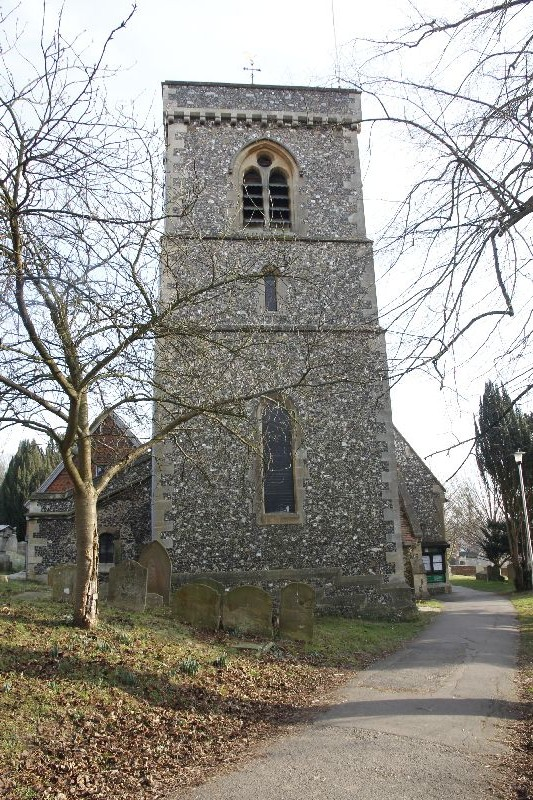
- St Peter's Church tower

- Location within Reading
- 51°28′7″N 0°58′51″W
- OS grid reference: SU 70889 74892
- Location: Caversham, Reading
- Country: England
- Denomination: Church of England
- Website: stpetercaversham.org.uk

History
- Founded: 1162
- Dedication: Saint Peter

Architecture
- Functional status: Active
- Heritage designation: Grade II*
- Style: Norman

Administration
- Diocese: Oxford
- Archdeaconry: Berkshire

St Peter's Church is a Church of England parish church in Caversham, a suburb of Reading in the English county of Berkshire. It is situated close to the River Thames in Caversham Heights.

== History ==
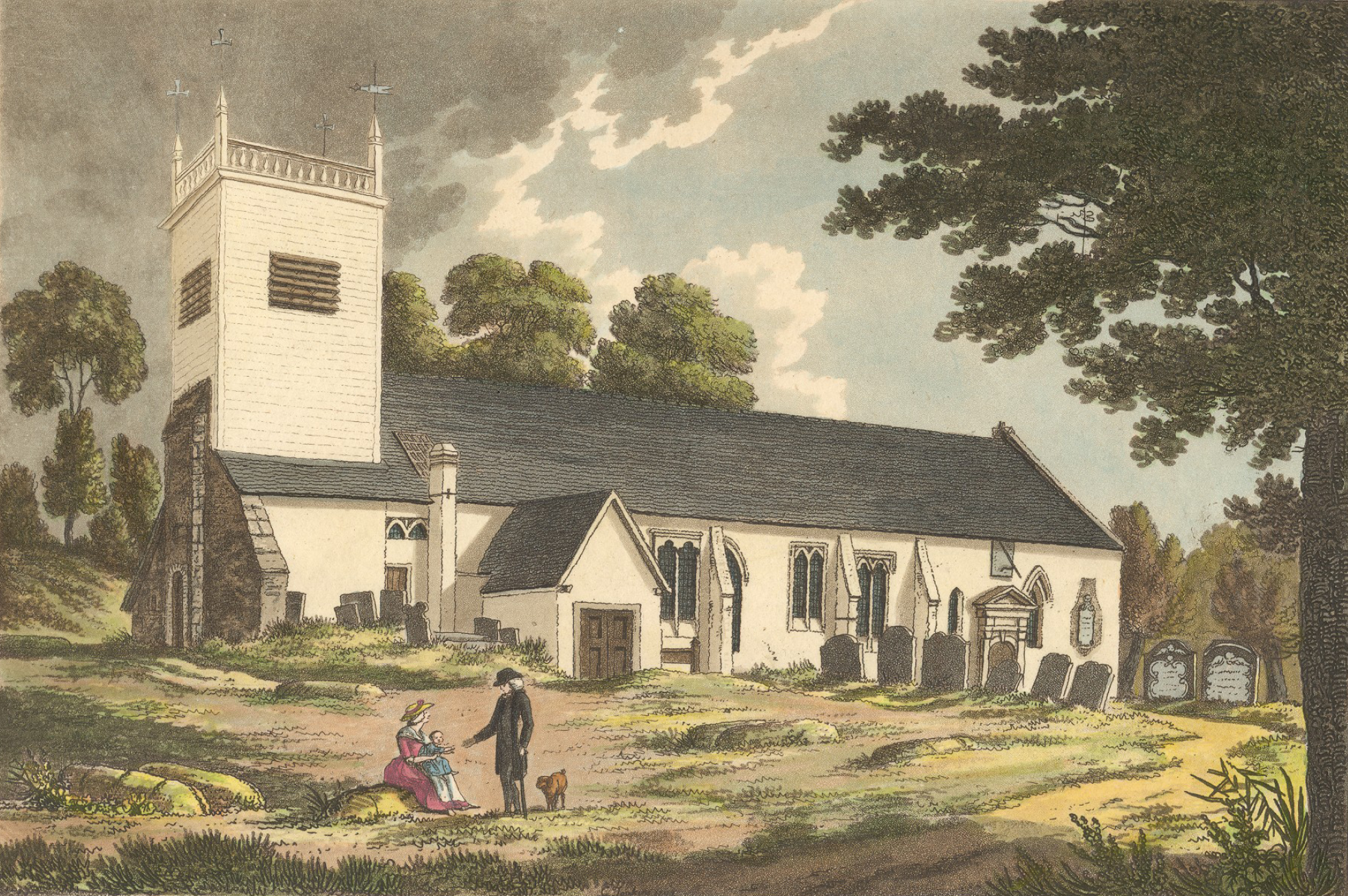
View from the south, 1800–1809

The church dates to 1162.

Royalists stationed troops in St Peter's Church during the Siege of Reading in 1643, and situated a cannon on top of the church tower. The Parliamentarians used artillery to destroy the tower. The church itself was also damaged in the process. The tower was initially replaced with a wooden tower. A south aisle was added in 1878, along with the present tower. It has eight bells, the oldest of which dates to 1637. Rectorial rights were restored in 1916.

In 2026, the church is trying to raise £180,000 to repair the roof.
