= Highdown School and Sixth Form Centre =

Location
- Surley Row; Reading, Berkshire, RG4 8LR; England; 51.481551°N 0.975113°W

Information
- Type: Academy
- Motto: Aspire and Achieve
- Established: 1971
- Local authority: Reading Borough Council
- Specialist: Maths and Computing
- Department for Education URN: 136307 Tables
- Ofsted: Reports
- Chair Of Governors: A Rajantie
- Head teacher: Laura Mathews
- Gender: Mixed
- Age: 11 to 18
- Enrolment: 1550
- Colours: Black, red, and white
- Website: http://www.highdown.reading.sch.uk/

Highdown School and Sixth Form Centre, usually referred to as simply Highdown School, is an academy in Emmer Green on the outskirts of Reading, Berkshire, England. It is part of GLF Schools, a multi-academy trust operating throughout South-East England.

The school has a capacity for approximately 1600 students aged 11–18. There are currently 1459 students on roll at the school with 262 students attending the Sixth Form. Highdown School is a non-selective school with provision for Special Education Needs and is a specialist school for maths and computing. Laura Mathews has been the head teacher since January 2025. The school's most recent Ofsted inspection, in 2024, rated the school "good".

== History ==
Grove house, a grade II listed building on the school grounds was built in the 1780s as a small farmhouse for thirty acres of arable farmland.

Highdown School was established as a comprehensive school in September 1971. Highdown School has three Grade II listed buildings within its grounds. The main building was altered and extended by Richard Norman Shaw from 1878–80.

On 1 November 2010, Highdown School became an independently run academy after being judged outstanding by Ofsted. It was the first school in Berkshire to be awarded academy status. During April 2015 Highdown School was judged as "Good" by Ofsted.

On 6 December 2012, the school’s governing body announced that Rachel Cave, formerly a Deputy Headteacher at The Heathland School in Hounslow, would take over the school from Easter 2013, replacing Tim Royle, Headteacher of 13 years.

== Controversy ==
Former headteacher Timothy Royle was accused of three counts of fraud and one count of theft in a case at Reading Magistrates Court.

Royle was accused of falsely reporting how bursary funds were being spent, keeping £7,000 and stealing computers and computer equipment from the school. The ex-headteacher was one of the first appointed National Leaders in Education to advise the Government on education policy who left the school in December 2012. He was cleared of these charges in March 2015.
