= Hanover Housing Association =

- Founded: 1963
- Type: Housing and services for people aged 55 and over
- Location: Staines-upon-Thames, UK
- Region served: England, United Kingdom
- Product: Retirement housing; extra care housing; downsizer housing; properties for rent and sale
- Key people: Dr Stuart Burgess MBE (Chair), Dame Clare Tickell (Chief Executive)
- Website: http://www.hanover.org.uk

Hanover Housing Association was a British registered social landlord (RSL) and a not for profit exempt charity registered as an industrial and provident society, number 16324R, up until November 2018, when the Association merged with Anchor to form Anchor Hanover Group.

== History ==
Hanover Housing Association was formed in 1963 and was named after Hanover Gate, the West Gate into London's Regent's Park, where the first Board meetings of the Association were held.

The Association managed almost 19,000 mixed tenure Retirement and Extra Care properties on more than 600 estates.

The proposed merger of Hanover Housing Association and Anchor was announced in May 2018, and was completed successfully later the same year, creating Anchor Hanover Group.

Dr Stuart Burgess CBE was Chairman of the Association and Clare Tickell was the Chief Executive until the merger with Anchor.

== See also ==
- Emmer Green (Hanover) Chalk Mine
