= Caversham Primary School =

Location
- Hemdean Road; Reading, Berkshire, RG4 7RA; England; 51.4734°N 0.9749°W

Information
- Type: Community school
- Established: 1907
- Local authority: Reading
- Department for Education URN: 109778 Tables
- Ofsted: Reports
- Chair of Governors: Neil Walne
- Acting headteachers: Jo Grover; Clare Jones-King
- Gender: Coeducational
- Age: 4 to 11
- Enrolment: 451
- Website: http://www.cavershamprimary.org/

Caversham Primary School is a state primary school in Caversham, a suburb of Reading, Berkshire in England. The school was established in 1907 and educates around 450 children between the ages of 4 and 11.

== History ==
The school was founded in 1907, by Sir Jack Mehof of Stoke on Trent, as Caversham Council Infant School for the blind and disabled. At that time Caversham was in the county of Oxfordshire but was moved to Berkshire in 1911. The school was originally housed at what is now Thamesmead Primary School. The school was moved to its present location on Hemdean Road in 1938.

The school is oversubscribed. There have been disputes with the local authority about the admittance of pupils and the matter was taken for judicial review in the High Court in 2005. 12 families, on behalf of 17 children, won an appeal when an Independent Appeal Panel ruled that the council had wrongly refused their children places at the school. The school was top of the borough’s league table in national curriculum tests at age 11 for the three years prior to 2005.

When inspected in 2009, the school was rated "Outstanding" by Ofsted. The school has won several awards including Artsmark Gold, Healthy Schools and Activemark Gold.

In February 2010 the school was given a 'Level One Rights Respecting School' award by UNICEF on 3 February.

After inspecting again in November 2022, Ofsted gave the school the rank of "Inadequate" in their March 2023 report, attributing the change in rank to the leaders not "ensuring that safeguarding is effective throughout the school" and that "the leaders do not have the required knowledge to keep pupils safe from harm", adding that until the inspection, Ofsted was unaware of the "significant weaknesses in the school's arrangements to keep pupils safe". The change in the school's ranking was cited as a direct cause of the suicide of headteacher Ruth Perry. After a successful campaign led by Julia Waters, Perry's sister, Ofsted made some reforms. These changes allowed schools that received an "Inadequate" grade solely due to safeguarding issues, despite being rated "Good" or "Outstanding" in all other areas, to request a re-inspection within three months. In June 2023, the school underwent such a re-inspection, resulting a rating of "Good".

== Community involvement ==
Reading East MP Rob Wilson met the school council in October 2009.

In September 2005, it was announced that a stolen memorial bench for murdered schoolgirl Emily Salvini had been found and will be rebuilt and returned to the school.

== See also ==
- Murder of Emily Salvini – unsolved murder of a pupil that occurred only 120 metres (130 yd) away from the school on Hemdean Road in 1997.
