= Reading Crematorium and Henley Road Cemetery =

Cemetery and crematorium in Reading, Berkshire, England

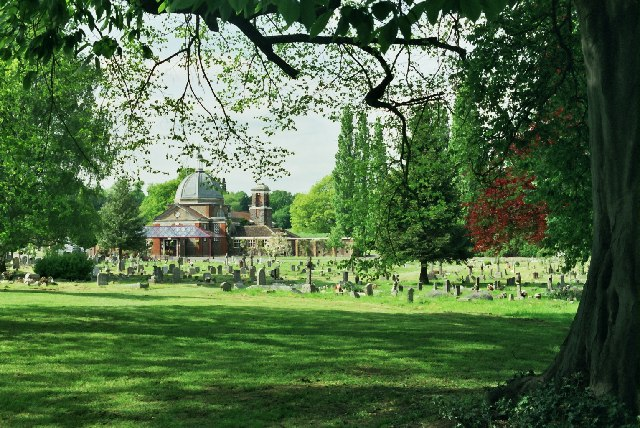
- Cemetery and crematorium
- Interactive map of Reading Crematorium and Henley Road Cemetery

Details
- Established: 1927 (cemetery); 1932 (crematorium)
- Location: Reading, Berkshire, UK
- Coordinates: 51.4756°N 0.9550°W

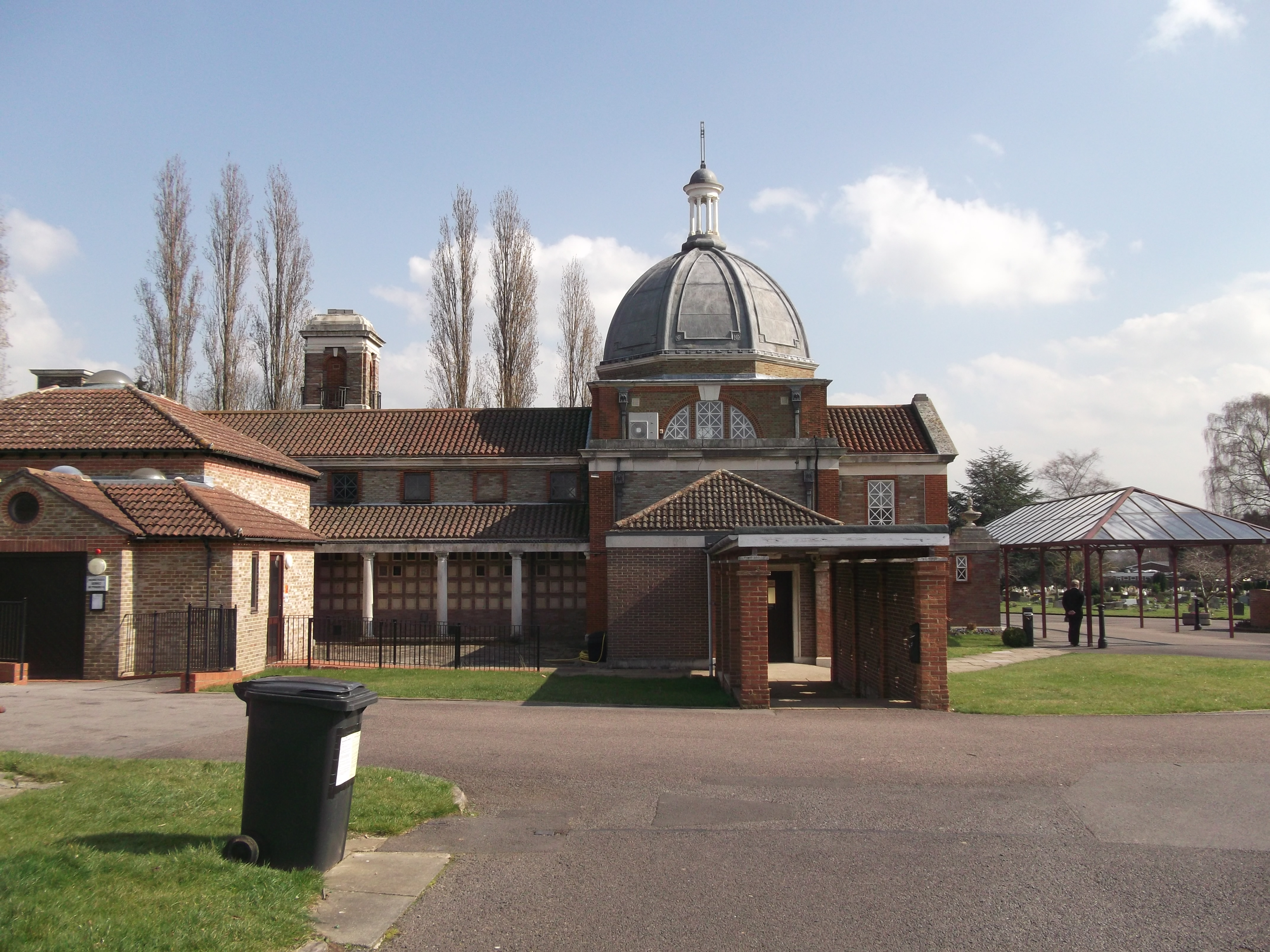
The Crematorium

Reading Crematorium and Henley Road Cemetery are situated on All Hallows Road in Caversham, a village and suburb that was once an independent town on the north bank of the River Thames opposite Reading. The crematorium and cemetery share a site, which includes two crematorium chapels (South and West chapels) as well as the borough's Cemetery and Crematorium Office.

Henley Road Cemetery is one of three cemeteries maintained by Reading Borough Council, alongside Reading Old Cemetery and Caversham Cemetery, although the other two are largely closed to new burials.

== History ==
The Cemetery and Crematorium are situated on what was originally an area of the grounds of Caversham Park House. This area was used as a major part of the site of the 1926 Royal Show, one of only two visits of the show to Reading.

Henley Road Cemetery opened the following year in 1927, and was followed by the Crematorium in 1932. Both were created by the County Borough of Reading, the predecessor of today's Reading Borough Council. Territorially they were located in Oxfordshire - hence their recording as such by the Commonwealth War Graves Commission through the Second World War - until the Caversham Park area was transferred to the Reading Borough and Royal County of Berkshire in 1977.

== War graves ==
The cemetery contains 118 Commonwealth service burials from the Second World War, about half of which are in a war graves plot immediately inside the main gates. Two Polish servicemen are also buried in the plot. Additionally 30 servicemen and women of the same war were cremated at the crematorium, and a screen wall within the war graves plot commemorates their names.

== Notable interments and cremations ==
Cremations:

- Wing Commander Jeffrey MacDougall (1911-1942), also Olympian modern pentathlete.
- Fred Potts (1892-1943), World War I Victoria Cross recipient.
- Michael Ryan (1960-1987), perpetrator of the Hungerford massacre.
- George Cole (1925-2015), actor.

== See also ==
- List of parks and open spaces in Reading, Berkshire
