= Fred Potts =

Recipient of the Victoria Cross

Frederick William Owen Potts
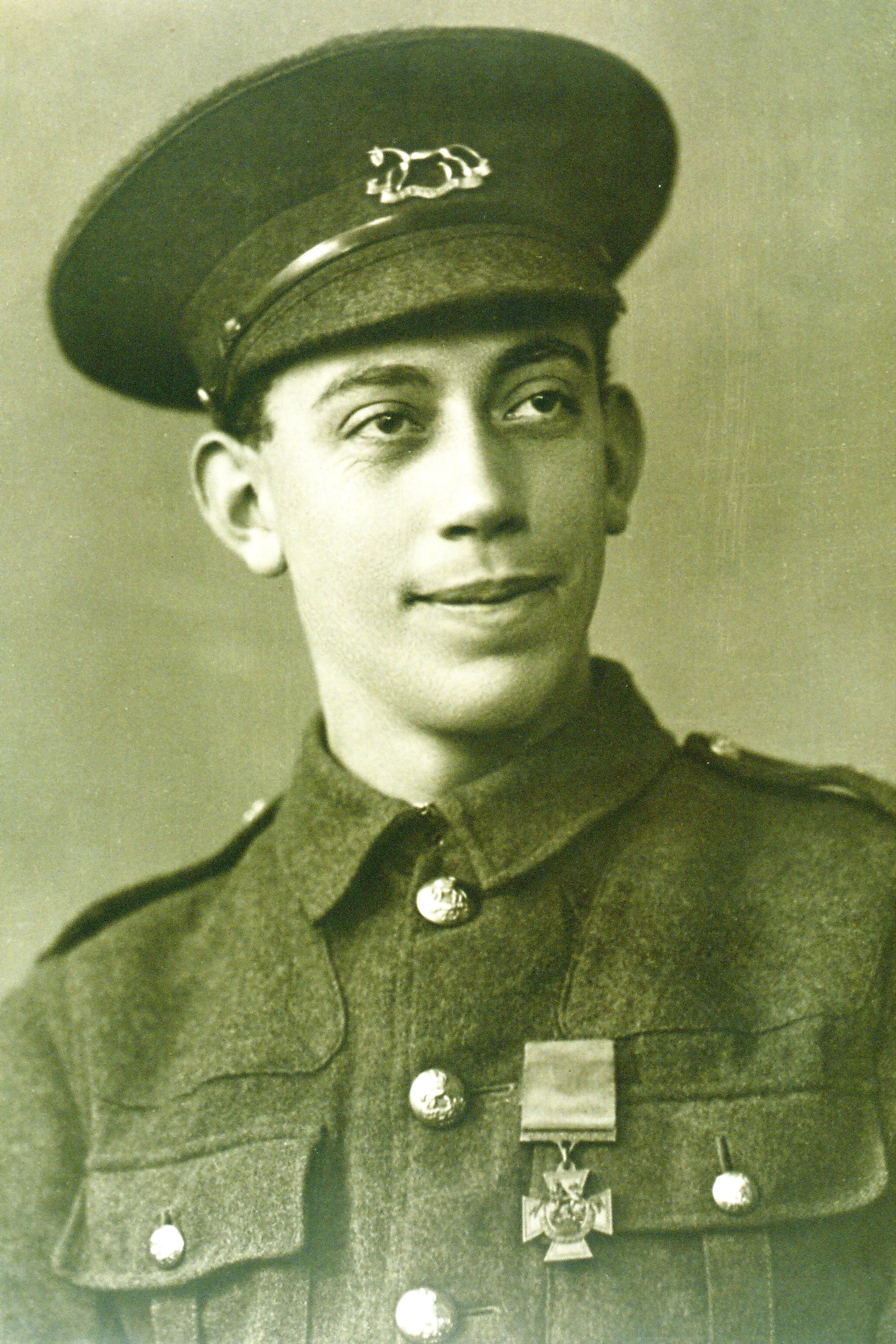
- Born: 18 December 1892; Reading, Berkshire, England
- Died: 2 November 1943 (aged 50); Reading, Berkshire, England
- Burial place: Reading Crematorium
- Military career
- Allegiance: United Kingdom
- Branch: British Army
- Rank: Lance-Corporal
- Units: 1/1st Berkshire Yeomanry
- Conflicts: World War I - Battle of Gallipoli
- Awards: Victoria Cross

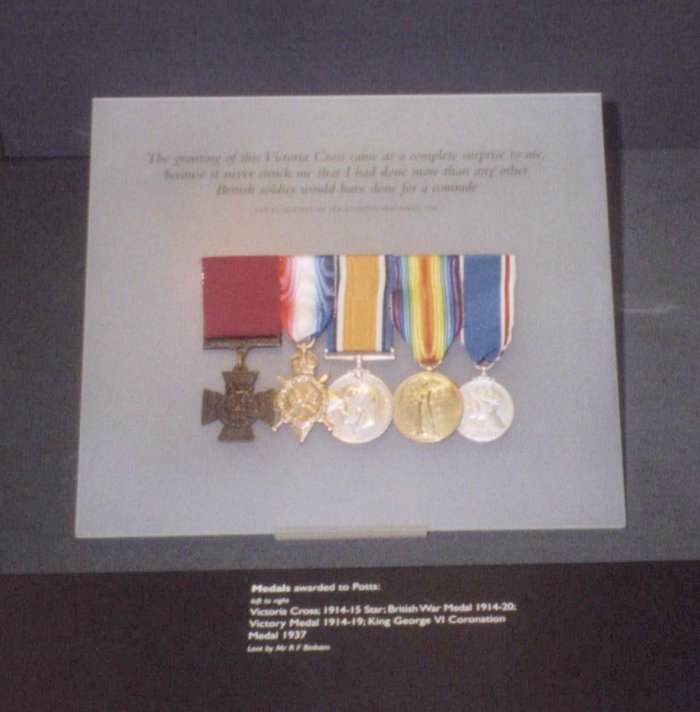
Potts' medal collection at Imperial War Museum.

Frederick William Owen Potts, VC, (18 December 1892 – 2 November 1943), more commonly known as Trooper Fred Potts, was an English recipient of the Victoria Cross, the highest and most prestigious award for gallantry in the face of the enemy that can be awarded to British and Commonwealth forces.

== Life ==
Potts was born and raised on Edgehill Street in the Katesgrove area of Reading. On leaving school in 1907, he became a Fitter at Pulsometer Engineering Co Ltd, then on Oxford Road, where he worked for 7 years. At University College Reading, a predecessor of Reading University, he studied machine construction, maths and mechanics. He enlisted in the Berkshire Yeomanry in June 1908. Potts first came to public notice in 1913, when he saved five-year-old boy, Charles Rex, from drowning in the River Thames.

When WWI was declared he was mobilised and sailed with his unit in April 1915 to Egypt.

In 1915, Potts was 22 years old, and a private in the 1/1st Berkshire Yeomanry of the British Army. During the Gallipoli Campaign of the First World War, he performed the following deed, for which he was awarded the Victoria Cross.

On 21 August 1915 in the attack on Hill 70, Potts (although wounded in the thigh) remained for over 48 hours under the Turkish trenches with Arthur Andrews, another private from his regiment who was severely wounded and unable to move. (Andrews also came from Reading.) Potts finally fixed a shovel to the equipment of his wounded comrade and, using this as a sledge, dragged the man back over 600 yards (550 m) to safety, being under fire all the way. He became known as "the hero with the shovel".

The award of the VC was announced in the London Gazette on 1 October 1915. His employers sent him a telegram of congratulations to him in the Orchard Convalescent Hospital in Dartford where he was recovering from his injuries. His VC was presented to him by King George V in December 1915. His heroism became a moment of celebration for the whole town.

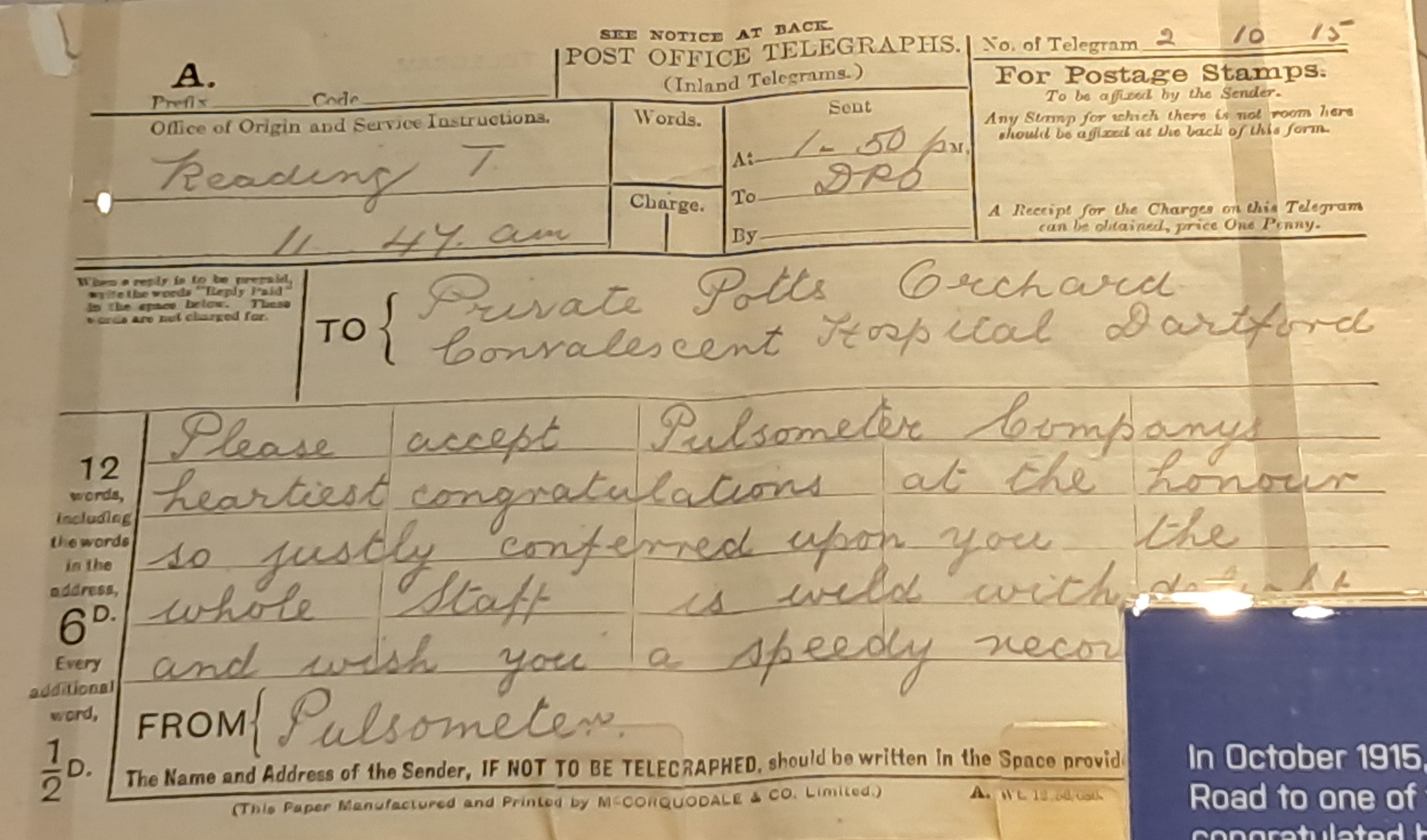

On return to Reading he was presented with an illuminated address in a silver casket by the then Mayor of Reading. During this event he said "There was many another Trooper who did the same thing, but his name unfortunately will never be known to the world" The company presented him with a gold watch and chain and his fellow workers at tea service and clock.

On 11 November 1920 he was one of the 100 recipients of the Victoria Cross who formed the Guard of Honour to the coffin of the Unknown Warrior as it processed into Westminster Abbey.

After the war he set up as a Master Tailor in Alpine Street, Reading. He was a Mason and in 1934 was Master of the Aldermaston Lodge. During WWII he was served in the Home Guard in the rank of lance-corporal.

Potts died on 2 November 1943 at the age of 50. His grave is at Reading Crematorium, whilst his medals are held by the Imperial War Museum.

Andrews lived until 1980, when he died at the age of 89. In 2009, as the result of the production of a BBC Radio Berkshire documentary on Potts, a reunion occurred between the relatives of the two men at the Imperial War Museum.

In 1967 The Victor children's magazine told the story very graphically on the front and back covers; it used to feature a story of bravery every week. This article has been used by the Memorial Trust to explain the story at local schools as a graphical presentation; being very much "of its time" appealed to children.

== Memorial in Reading ==
During Prime Minister's Questions on 20 January 2010, Martin Salter, Member of Parliament for Reading West, indicated that there were plans to provide a permanent memorial to Trooper Potts. It was announced in May 2014 that the memorial would be sited just outside Forbury Gardens, on the open paved area opposite the Crown Court / The Forbury Hotel.

The Trooper Potts VC Memorial Trust was established to raise the necessary funds to build the memorial in 2010, gaining charitable status in 2012. The trust raised the £150,000 required.

Liverpool sculptor Tom Murphy designed the memorial. The life-sized, cast-bronze sculpture was installed on 2 October 2015.

A roll of honour lists the names of 426 men of The Berkshire Yeomanry who gave their lives in the wars of the twentieth century. They are listed by war, by rank and then alphabetically and at the centre is a quote from John F Kennedy. Since the Roll off Honour was unveiled a further 20+ men have been identified, it is not however practical to make these additions.

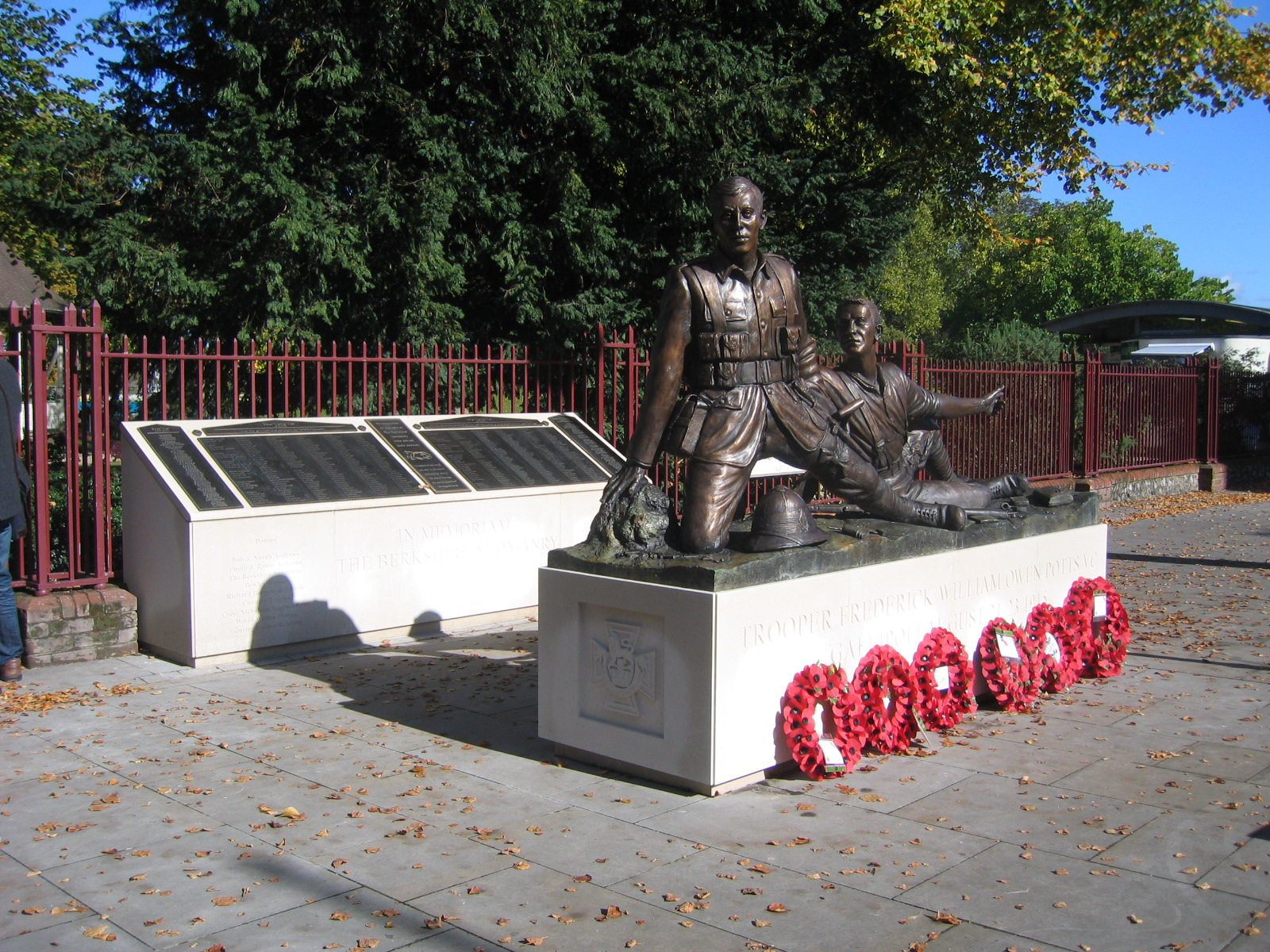
Sculpture of Trooper Potts VC (to the left) and Trooper Andrews. Against the railings is the roll of honour

== Other honours ==
In 1992 a long commemorative stone was installed on the wall behind the Brock Barracks Keep on Oxford Road, Reading, within the Barracks boundary. It includes the Berkshire Yeomanry Badge, the VC and Potts dates and an extract of the citation.

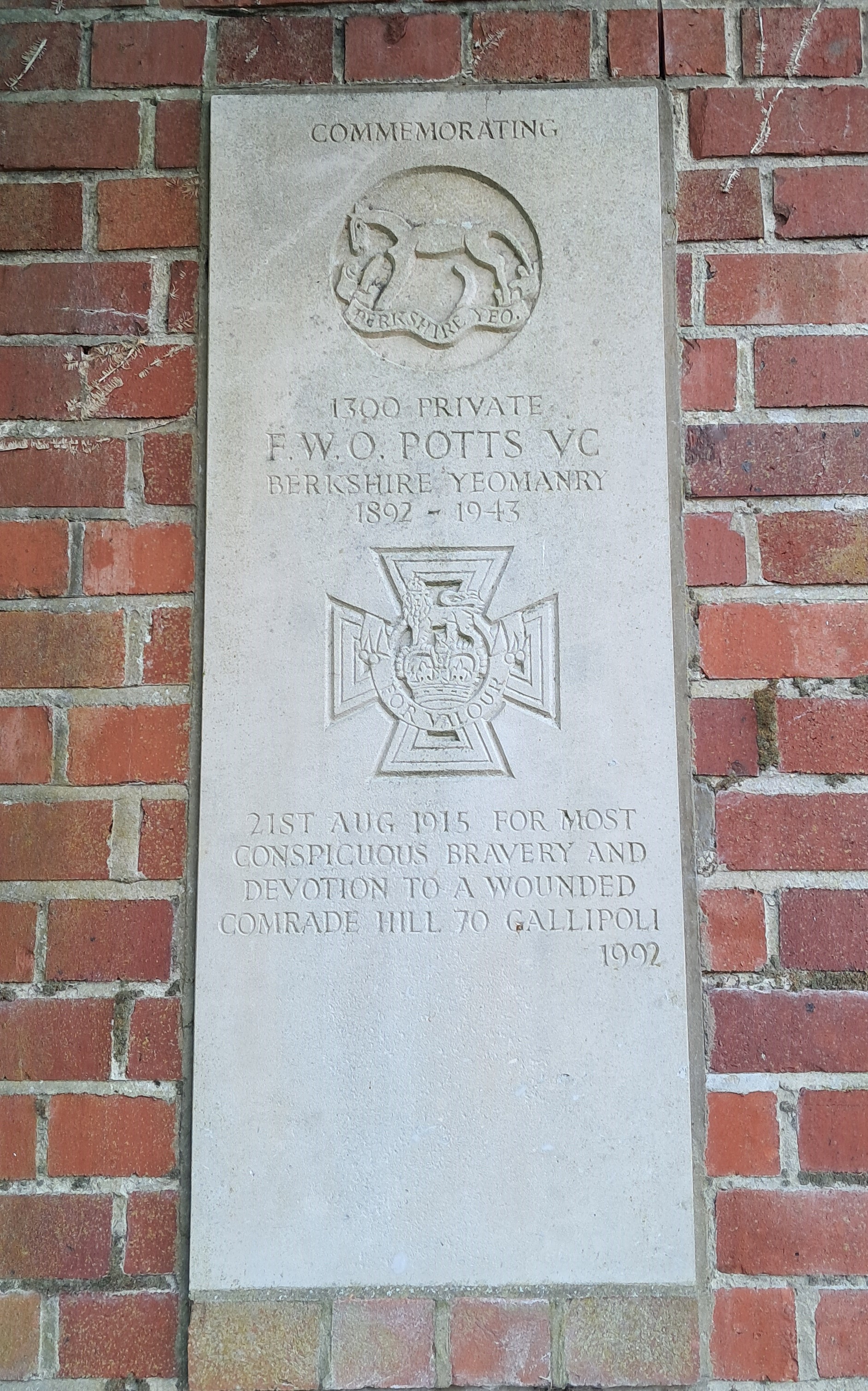
Potts VC Stone in Brock Barracks, erected 1992

Potts was commemorated in September 2013 in the name of a new road, Trooper Potts Way, created during construction of the Reading Station north entrance. It was unveiled on 5 April 2014.

The Government's Commemorative VC Paving Stone was set in the eastern corner of the 1920s War Memorial. It was unveiled in a small ceremony by Trooper Potts' granddaughter, Anne Ames, at 17:00 on 21 August 2015, the exact centenary of the Berkshire Yeomanry's attack on Scimitar Hill.

On 21 March 2016, Greene King opened a new pub/restaurant along Basingstoke Road, to the south of Reading called The Trooper Potts. It featured two very large displays which tell the story of the rescue and Fred and Arthur's lives. In 2019 the company changed the name to The Victoria Cross in a "rebrand" in an attempt to distance it with some unfortunate behaviour by users, the décor now features information about the VC winners from across Berkshire.

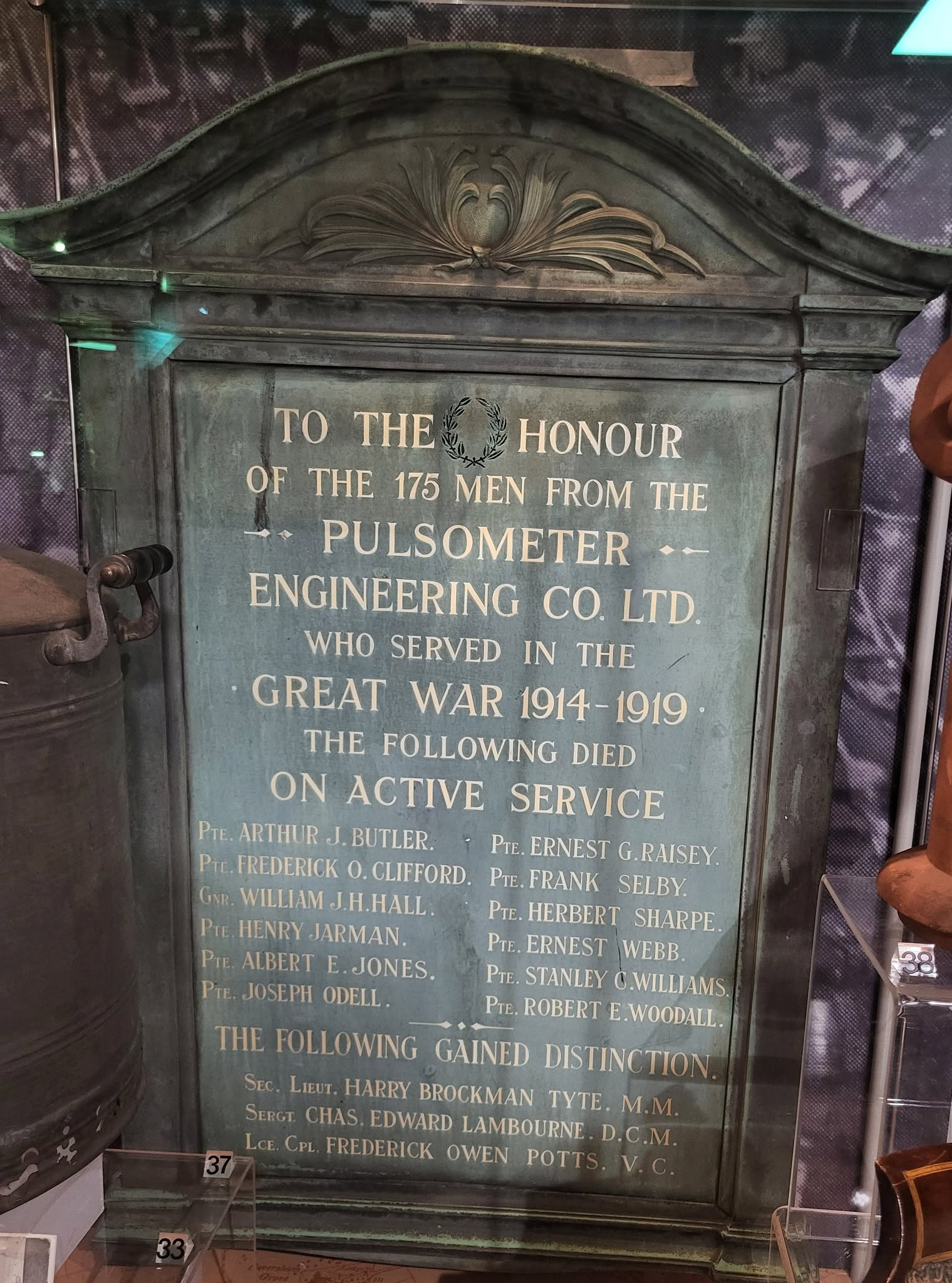

On display in Reading Museum is a memorial to the 175 men of the Pulsometer Pumps company who served in WWI, of which 12 gave their lives and 3, including Potts, gained distinctions

== Educational outreach ==
In 2011 the trust started to work with the history department of Reading College. Their students have helped the trust by fundraising, joining the committee and teaching to local primary schools about the First World War, Gallipoli and this local story. In 2013 the Trooper Potts prize for History was introduced at the college, it was awarded for 3 years.

Starting in 2013 the Trust has delivered presentations about this Reading story to local groups.

The trust delivered Trooper Potts mornings at Katesgrove Primary School, Fred Potts' old school, Southcote Primary School and St Edwards School. The curators of the Berkshire Yeomanry Museum brought along kit of the period for the children to see / try on. Shorter events were run at other schools. In 2018 it delivered sessions to Cub and Brownie groups in Ascot and Staines. The outreach work to schools started in 2012 in Katesgrove and Southcote Primary Schools with the occasional new school being added.

== The Victoria Cross ==
The trust commissioned a film of David Callaghan, a former director of Hancocks & Co, the London jewellers which has supplied the VC since it was instituted on 29 January 1856, explaining the history of the Victoria Cross. This is being used in its educational work.

== Bibliography ==
- Harvey, David (1999). Monuments to Courage : Victoria Cross Headstones and Memorials. Vol.1, 1854-1916. Kevin & Kay Patience. ISBN 978-1847348098.
- Buzzell, Nora (1997). The Register of the Victoria Cross (third ed.). This England. ISBN 0-906324-27-0.
- Snelling, Stephen (1995). VCs of the First World War - Gallipoli. Gloucestershire: Sutton Publishing Limited. ISBN 0-7509-0566-2.
