= Charles Marsack =

British army officer and landowner (1747/8–1820)

Charles Marsack (1747/8 – 22 December 1820) was an East India Company army officer and landowner who, from seemingly humble origins had made a fortune in India, and according to stories first published in Burke's Landed Gentry in 1894, was reputedly the son of Frederick, Prince of Wales or of King George II by a so-called Comtesse de Marsac. He was said to have been born about 1735–36 (from his age at burial) but was probably born (from his age at marriage) in 1747–48 and was said to have married in 1767 (whereas he married in 1783). He was actually the son of Jean Charles Marsac (1708–1751), a servant to one of George II's pages, Joachim Lorentz Sollifoffer (died 1754), who in his will made generous provision for the widowed Margaret Marsac née Saunders and her child Jean Charles who was his godson. Jean Charles Marsac's father was the son of a migrant from Poitou, also called Charles Marsac, a carpenter, who had come to England before 1704/5. Jean Charles Marsac was usually called Charles Marsac and was apprenticed as a weaver. He died in Kensington in 1751, having married at St Martin in the Fields in 1745/6 one Margaret Saunders who was probably related to Thomas Saunders (died 1753), standing wardrobe keeper to George I and George II. She married secondly at St George's Chapel, Mayfair, John Holcroft (died 1768), and died in 1785, her administration being granted to Charles Marsack her 'natural and lawful son'. By her second husband she had a daughter Margaretta Holcroft (1755–1785) who lived with William Roome and had several illegitimate children by him who (aided by editions of Burke's Landed Gentry down to 1937) spread the story that she was the daughter of Margaret, Comtesse de Marsac.

Marsack went to India around 1760 as an ensign in the service of the East India Company. After being appointed lieutenant and surveyor of the province of Oudh, he rose by 1777 to be captain of a cavalry unit of the Nabob of Oudh. Resigning his commission in 1779, he in 1780 undertook an arduous journey from Lucknow to Delhi and back to meet the powerful Najaf Khan, a journey that was documented by his native travelling companion. He was expelled from Oudh by Warren Hastings in 1782 and gave evidence against the latter at his trial.

In 1783 he returned to England as Major Marsack and following marriage, with £20,000 contributed by his wife's trustees, bought Caversham Park in Oxfordshire from Lord Cadogan, restoring and enlarging the house in the Greek style, including the installation of a large Corinthian colonnade at the front. Thomas Jefferson had previously described the estate as having 25 acres of garden, 400 acres of park and 6 acres of kitchen garden. Now in Berkshire and from 1943 to 2018 used by the BBC, Caversham Park house has been rated a Grade II listed building.

Marsack served as High Sheriff of Oxfordshire for 1787 and died at Caversham Park, 8 November 1820. He was survived by his widow Charlotte Becher (1767–1837), whom he had married at Epsom, Surrey in 1783, and by seven of his eleven children: Richard Henry (1786–1852), George Hartwell (*1791), Edward Claude (*1794) and four daughters Charlotte (*1785), Caroline (1800–1836) who married Thomas Frederick Sowdon (1793–1873), son of Thomas Sowdon and Eleanor at St Mary's Church, Reading in 1821, Louisa (*1802), Mary Eleanor (*1807). His eldest son Charles, born in 1784, had died in 1786, and the Caversham estate passed to his eldest surviving son, Richard Henry, a lieutenant-colonel in the Grenadier Guards, who sold it in 1844 to William Crawshay.
