= Emmer Green (Hanover) Chalk Mine =

Mine in England, United Kingdom

Coordinates: 51.4867°N 0.9605°W

The Emmer Green (Hanover) Chalk Mine is an extensive abandoned subterranean chalk mine at Emmer Green, north of Reading in Berkshire, located just north of the junction of Peppard Road and Kiln Road (OS Grid Ref: SU722769). The mine is so named because the land is now owned by the Hanover Housing Association who have a development adjacent at Wordsworth Court. The mine is one of a number of known mines in the Emmer Green and Reading area where chalk mining was often done in conjunction with brick making as chalk and clay are found together in the area and chalk was use in the making of bricks. It is likely other abandoned mines remain undiscovered. The area was once known as Rose Hill and contained brickfield and chalk mining works.

The mine was discovered in 1977 during building works. Access is through a 50-foot (15 m) fixed steel ladder in a narrow vertical shaft below a locked iron cover.
