= Clare Tickell =

British businesswoman

Dame Oriana Clare Tickell DBE
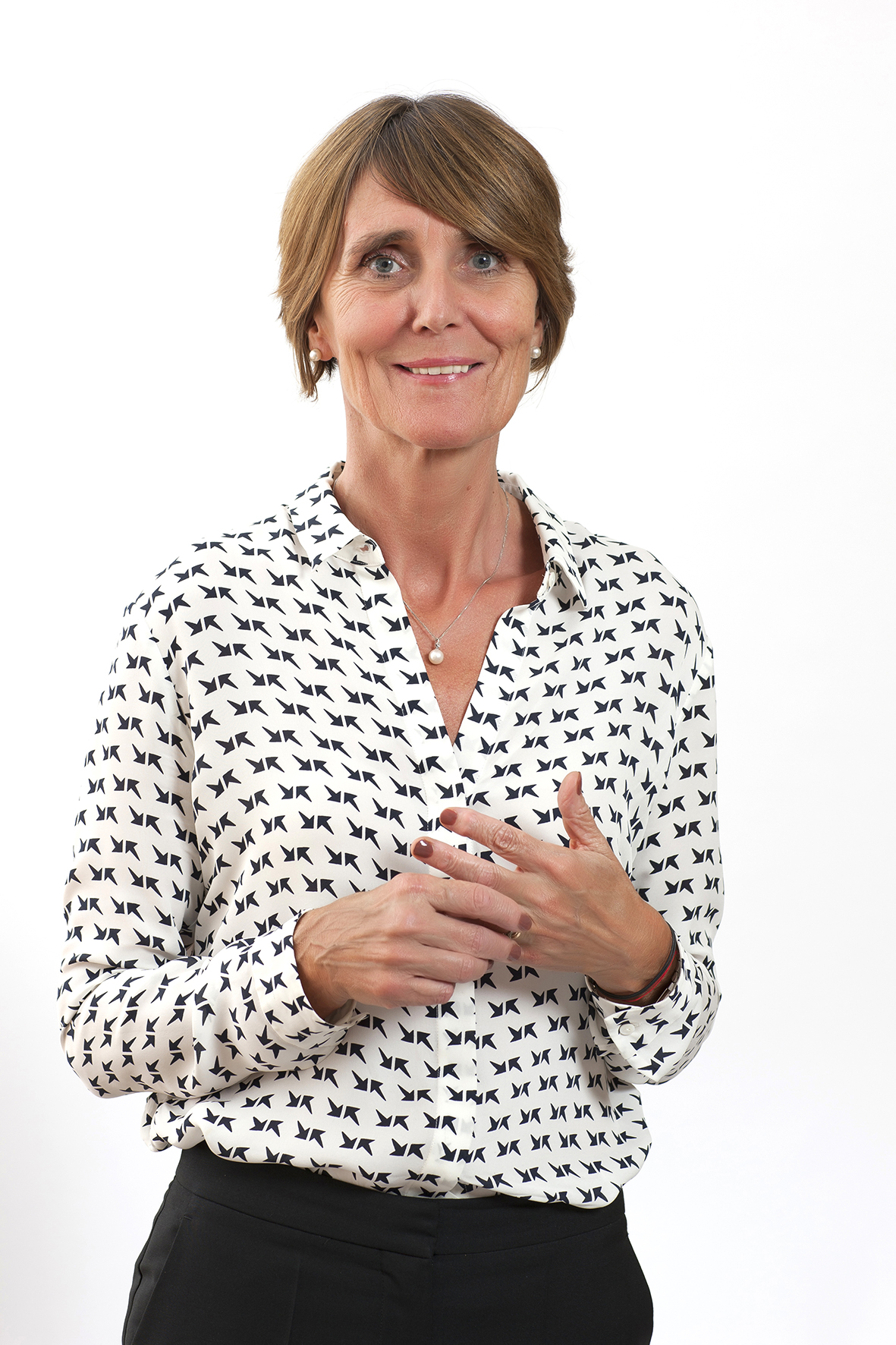
- Tickell in 2014
- Born: 25 May 1958 (age 68)
- Education: Bristol University
- Occupations: Independent Director, John Lewis Partnership
- Known for: Action for Children; Early Years Foundation Review; Hanover Housing Association; Early Intervention Foundation; John Lewis Partnership
- Spouse: Eddy Andres (deceased)
- Children: Two sons

Dame Oriana Clare Tickell, DBE (born 25 May 1958) is a Trustee of the Nuffield Foundation, Senior Advisor at Newton Europe and Chair of the John Lewis Partnership Charitable Foundation John Lewis Partnership.

== Career ==
Clare Tickell joined the John Lewis Partnership as an Independent Director in October 2019 and is now the Chair of the John Lewis Partnership Foundation, an independent Charity. The John Lewis Partnership, which includes retailers John Lewis & Partners and Waitrose & Partners, its financial services and other retail-related activities, is the UK's largest employee owned business. The company is owned by a trust on behalf of all its employees – known as Partners – who have a say in the running of the business and receive a share of profits.

Prior to this, Clare was Chief Executive of Hanover Housing Association from January 2014 to November 2018. Founded in 1963, Hanover was one of England's leading providers of affordable housing and services for the over 55s. Hanover merged with Anchor Trust in 2019 to form Anchor Hanover Group.

Tickell was previously Chief Executive of Action for Children (2005–2013), one of the UK's largest and most important charities. Here she was able to influence the development of policies that affect the lives of the most vulnerable and neglected children, young people and their families and communities across the UK. In July 2010, it was announced that she would be conducting a review for the UK government in the Early Years Foundation Stage Framework which sets learning and welfare standards for the under fives. The Review was published in 2011 and its recommendations implemented in 2012.

Before this position Tickell was Chief Executive, Stonham Housing Association, 1997–2004; Chief Executive, Phoenix House Housing Association (now known as Phoenix Futures) 1992–1997; Director, Riverpoint Single Homeless 1989–1992; Deputy Director, Centrepoint (charity) Soho 1986–1989; and as Assistant Warden, Avon Probation Service 1982–1984. In 2019 she was an Associate Director of The Centre for Ageing Better, a What Works Centre.

== Current affiliations ==
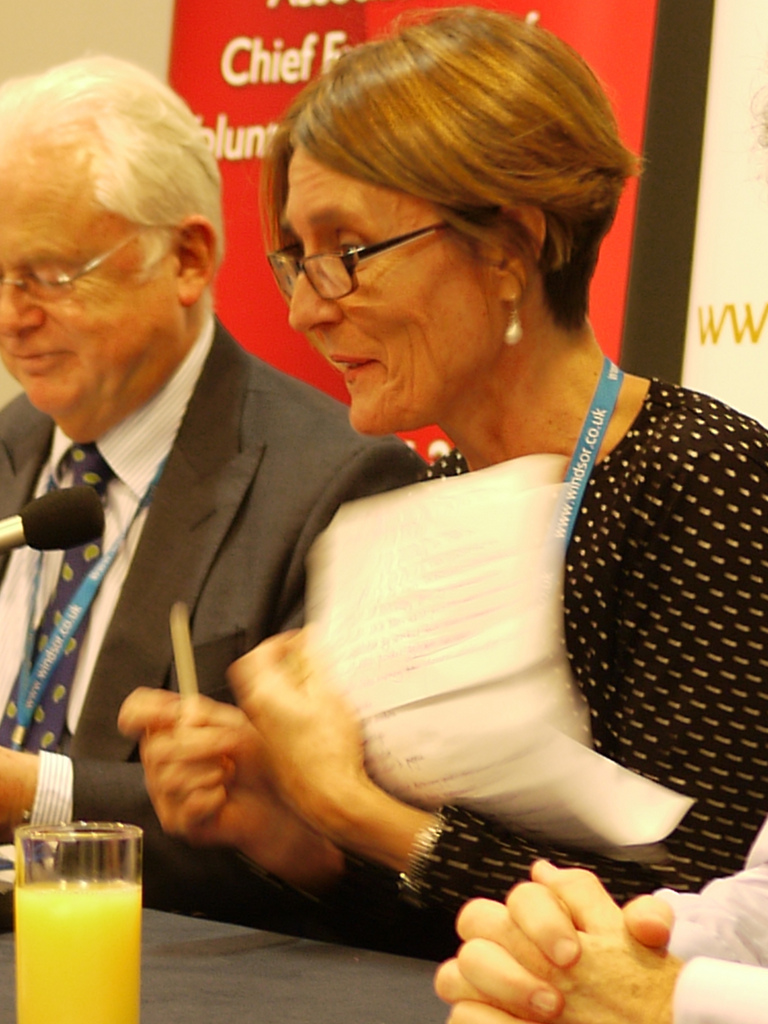
Tickell in 2011

- Trustee Nuffield Foundation
- Chair John Lewis Partnership Charitable Foundation
- Senior Advisor Newton Europe

== Former affiliations ==
- Independent Director, John Lewis Partnership
- Board member & RemCo Chair National Audit Office 2018-2024
- Chair, Big Society Trust
- Chair of the Board, Early Intervention Foundation, a charity and one of the Government's What Works centres
- Chair, CVLS Honours Committee
- Chair, Honours Diversity and Inclusion Committee
- 2011 – March 2014 The Guinness Partnership Board
- October 2011 – October 2013 Chair, Help the Hospices (now Hospice UK) Independent Commission into the Future of Hospice Care
- February 2009 – July 2010 Member of the Commission on 2020 Public Services sponsored by the RSA
- 2004 – 2009 Member of the Howard League Commission on English Prisons
- 2004 – April 2010 Member of the Management Board – Information Commission, the Commission with responsibility for the Data Protection Act and Freedom of Information Act.

== Honours/awards ==
- Dame Commander of the Order of the British Empire (DBE) in the 2010 New Year Honours for services to young people.
- Fellow of the City and Guilds Institute
- Honorary Doctorate of Laws, University of Bristol
- Honorary Doctorate of Grossteste University (awarded 2013)
