= Anchor (housing association) =

English non-profit housing association

- Founded: Oxford, England, 1968
- Founder: Cecil Jackson-Cole
- Type: Housing, care and support for older people
- Location: London
- Region served: England
- Product: Retirement housing; properties for rent and sale, retirement villages, care homes, specialist dementia care, respite care
- Key people: Chief Executive; Princess Alexandra, Patron
- Revenue: £389.1m
- Employees: More than 8,500
- Volunteers: Over 400 in 2013
- Website: https://www.anchor.org.uk

Anchor was England’s largest not-for-profit provider of housing, care and support to people over 55 years old up until November 2018 when Anchor merged with Hanover Housing Association to form Anchor Hanover Group, the largest provider of specialist housing and care for older people in England.

Anchor had been a charitable housing association registered as a society under the Co-operative and Community Benefit Societies Act 2014, and one of the largest in the UK, with a turnover of £389.1 million in 2017/18.

Anchor's headquarters were in central London, with main offices located in Bradford. It employed more than 8,500 people nationally.

Its patron was Princess Alexandra.

== History ==
Anchor was established in 1968 by Cecil Jackson-Cole, as Help the Aged (Oxford) Housing Association, to provide sheltered housing to older people. By 1972, the organisation had completed its first new-build properties and begun diversifying into both leasehold and rented accommodation.

The organisation became Anchor Housing Association in 1975, and launched its first care homes in 1982.

Anchor's multi award-winning Denham Garden Village – their largest development of retirement properties to date – opened in 2004.

Anchor continued to grow its existing services and diversify into new services such as retirement villages and extra care housing, becoming a thought-leader in caring for individuals with dementia and promoting equality for minority groups, such as LGBT groups.

The organisation rebranded from Anchor Trust to Anchor in 2010, adopting a new logo and refreshed brand image to reflect the range of services on offer.

In 2012 a ground-breaking new care home called West Hall was opened in West Byfleet, Surrey. In the same year it won the Best Interior Dementia Design category at the National Dementia Care Awards 2012.

In 2015 a new 'Support Hub' was created in Bradford.

Since April 2015 Anchor opened a series of new developments:

- April 2015 - Buckingham Lodge care home
- August 2015 - Bishopstoke Park retirement village and Maple Tree Court care home
- September 2015 - Mayflower Court care home and Clayburn Court care home
- December 2015 - Moore Place care home
- January 2016 - Hampshire Lakes retirement village and Austin Place retirement apartments
- October 2016 - Hurst Place retirement houses
- Spring 2017 - Nelson Lodge care home
- Summer 2017 - Hurst Place retirement apartments and Phase 2 of Bishopstoke Park retirement village
- January 2018 - Phase 2 of Hampshire Lakes retirement village
- May 2018 - Eaves Court care led apartments

The proposed merger of Anchor and Hanover Housing Association was announced in May 2018, and was completed successfully later the same year, creating Anchor Hanover Group

== Services ==
Anchor offered three main services:

- Retirement properties to rent - Anchor let a range of properties, typically flats, although the housing portfolio did include some bungalows, at more than 700 sites across England. Each site was overseen by a manager, and had access to a 24-hour emergency call system. Anchor also provided a number of extra-care properties.
- Retirement properties to buy - Anchor managed a portfolio of 200 leasehold estates, where the individual owned the property and Anchor provided the necessary property management service. Since 2015 Anchor responded to the growing demand for higher-quality retirement properties, opening an array of new developments including The Laureates, in Guiseley, near Leeds, Austin Place in Weybridge and Hurst Place in Haywards Heath. They also invested in new retirement villages; Bishopstoke Park and Hampshire Lakes, both in Hampshire. These new sites included a number of innovative features for retirement housing, such as spas, swimming pools, salons and cafés.
- Care homes - Anchor operated a number of care homes across England, each providing trained 24-hour personal and practical support. Anchor advocated the personalisation of care provision and was politically active in promoting person-centred dementia care. Anchor's specialised dementia homes used the latest techniques and understanding to assist individuals living with dementia, such as sensory gardens and contrasting colour schemes. In 2015 Anchor acquired 24 care homes from LNT Group as well as the Cavendish Healthcare Group's five care homes.

== Governance ==
Anchor was governed by a trustee board of non-executive directors, and an executive management board of executive directors. Anchor’s Chief Executive, Jane Ashcroft, was awarded the Outstanding Contribution to Social Care award at the Great British Care Home Awards 2010 in recognition of her "...[leading] the agenda on developing quality care services across the continuum of care." She also topped a high-profile list of the most influential people in social care at the Care Talk Awards 2012, and is a trustee of The Silver Line, a helpline for older people. Ashcroft is a graduate of the University of Stirling. She was appointed a CBE in the 2014 New Year Honours.

In 2010 the high salaries of housing association executives drew criticism from the incoming government, in particular that the highest paid executive at a housing association was the chief executive of Anchor, earning £391,000 per year. The Housing Minister, Grant Shapps, said that the pay packages were unacceptable.

Anchor was regulated by the Care Quality Commission, the Regulator of Social Housing and the Financial Conduct Authority.

== Agenda and influence ==
Anchor frequently sought to use its profile to draw attention to issues within the care environment. The organisation published white paper documents investigating ageism on television, lobbied parliament on the importance of older people's issues, and sought to underline the importance of person-centred care.

The organisation also campaigned to highlight the importance of retaining residential scheme managers at retirement properties.

In 2011 Anchor launched The Grey Pride campaign, calling on government to appoint a Minister for Older People to prioritise the needs of older people and make sure their views and interests receive dedicated attention. The petition gathered 137,000 signatures and was handed in to Downing Street on Monday 28 November 2011. As a result of the campaign the shadow cabinet appointed Liz Kendall as Shadow Minister for Older People. Portsmouth North MP Penny Mordaunt secured a debate on the topic in the House of Commons on Thursday 28 June 2012.

In June 2013 a charity single was released by The Anchor Community Band to celebrate the positive aspects of ageing and challenge stereotypes and misconceptions in a fun and inclusive way. More than 350 people from Anchor’s retirement housing and care homes were involved in recording the song. It reached number one in the Amazon singles chart and raised over £15,000 for national charity Contact the Elderly.

As well as recognition for its dementia training, Anchor also received praise for its work in palliative care, and nutrition and catering.

Anchor were one of the first organisations to pioneer Your Care Rating, a groundbreaking customer satisfaction survey first conducted by Ipsos MORI in 2012.
