= Jeffrey MacDougall =

British modern pentathlete

Personal information
- Born: 16 September 1911 Buenos Aires, Argentina
- Died: 11 December 1942 (aged 31)

Sport
- Sport: Modern pentathlon

Jeffrey MacDougall DFC (16 September 1911 – 11 December 1942) was a British modern pentathlete. He competed at the 1932 and 1936 Summer Olympics. He was killed in action during World War II.

== Personal life ==
MacDougall, who came to England from Argentina at age eight, was commissioned as an officer in the Duke of Cornwall's Light Infantry in 1932, and was seconded to the Royal Air Force as a flying officer on probation four years later. With the outbreak of the Second World War, MacDougall was promoted to flight lieutenant. He was awarded the Distinguished Flying Cross in 1940, for attacking a German airfield with "courage and determination". He flew 22 missions before dying on active service in December 1942, leaving a widow. He was cremated at Reading Crematorium.
