= Caversham, Reading =

Village and suburb in Berkshire, England

Coordinates: 51°28′01″N 0°58′23″W

Caversham
- Village
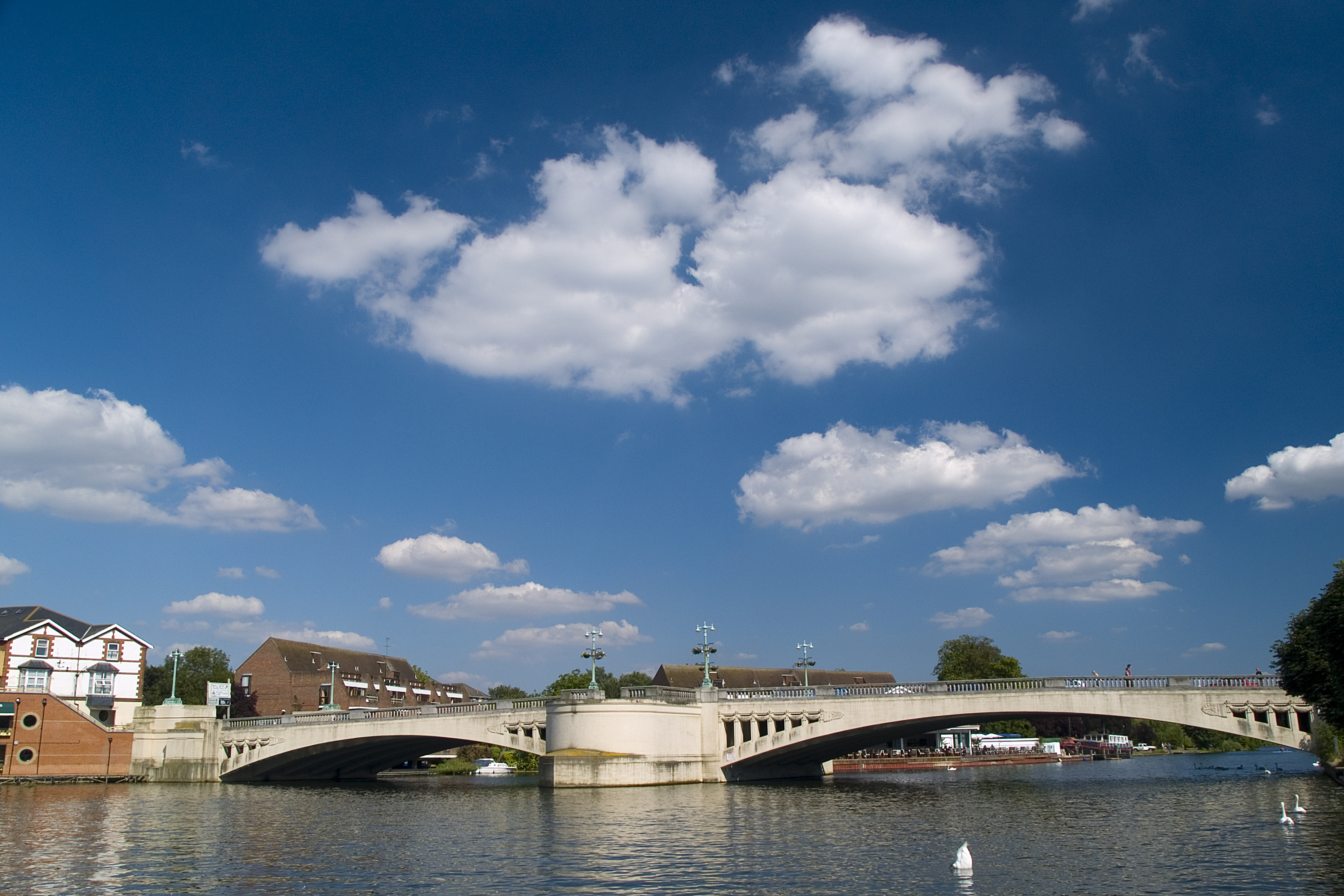
- Caversham Bridge

- Location within Berkshire
- Area: 6.64 km^{2} (2.56 sq mi)
- Population: 23,885 (2011 census) (Note: Excludes Reading 001A, B and D which are Emmer Green)
  - Density: 3,597/km^{2} (9,320/sq mi)
- OS grid reference: SU7174
- Unitary authority: Reading
- Ceremonial county: Berkshire
- Region: South East
- Country: England
- Sovereign state: United Kingdom
- Post town: Reading
- Postcode district: RG4
- Dialling code: 0118
- Police: Thames Valley
- Fire: Royal Berkshire
- Ambulance: South Central
- UK Parliament: Reading Central

Caversham is a village and a suburb of Reading in Berkshire, England, located directly north of Reading town centre across the River Thames. Caversham rises from the River Thames, lying on flood plain and the lowest reaches of the Chiltern Hills is one of the few places in Berkshire to be considered part of the Chilterns. Two road bridges, Caversham Bridge and Reading Bridge, and two footbridges join Caversham to the rest of Reading.

Named areas within the suburb include Emmer Green, Lower Caversham, Caversham Heights and Caversham Park Village. Notable landmarks include Caversham Court, a public park and former country house; Balmore Walk, another public park with wide views; Caversham Lakes; and part of the Thames Path national trail.

Recorded as early as 1086, Caversham was part of the Henley district of Oxfordshire (it is located around 6 miles (9.7 km) south west of Henley). With the exception of the centre of Caversham and Emmer Green, which were traditional villages, much of the development occurred during the 20th century. In 1911, it was transferred to Berkshire and became part of the county borough of Reading.

== History ==
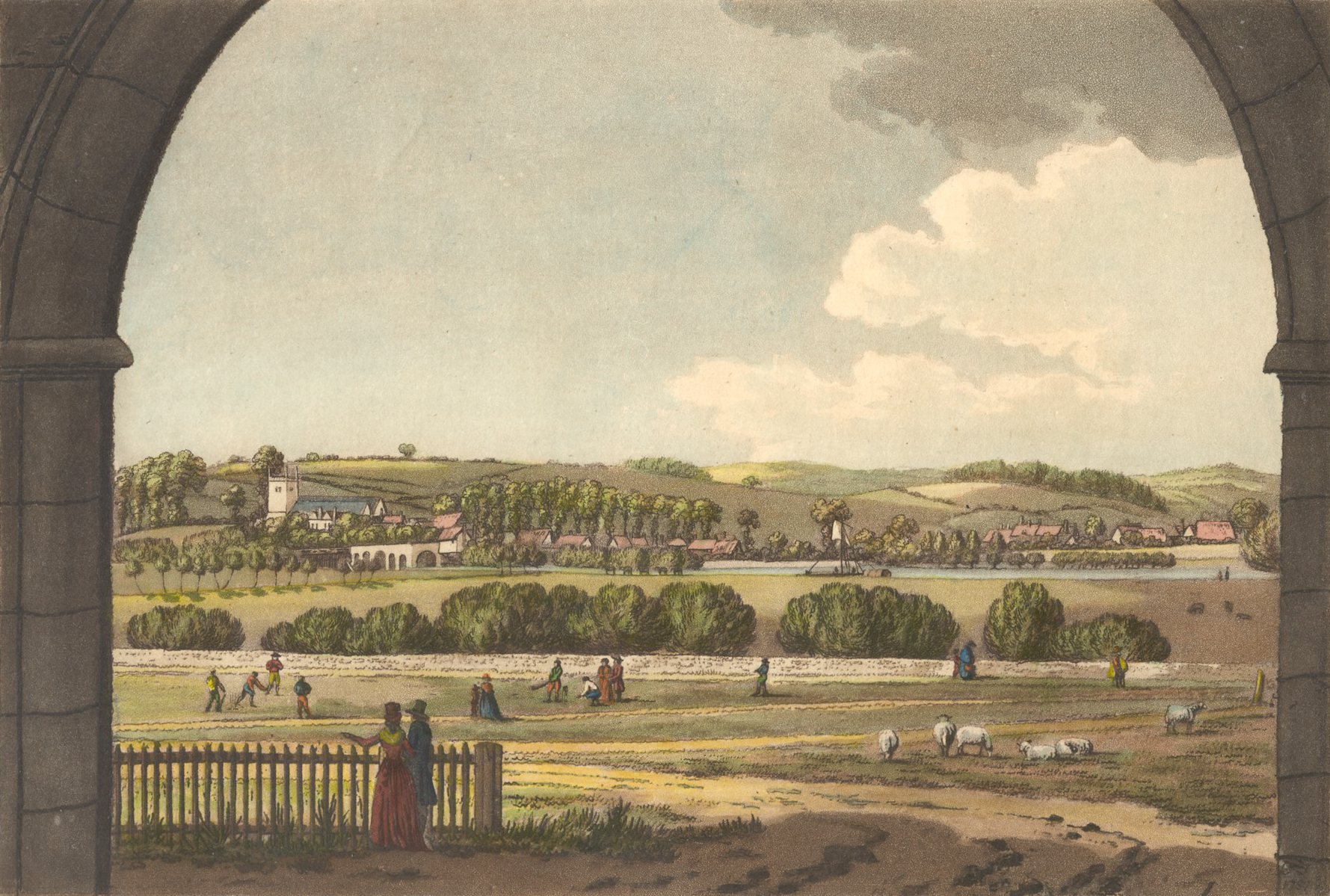
View of Caversham through the inner gateway of Reading Abbey in 1791

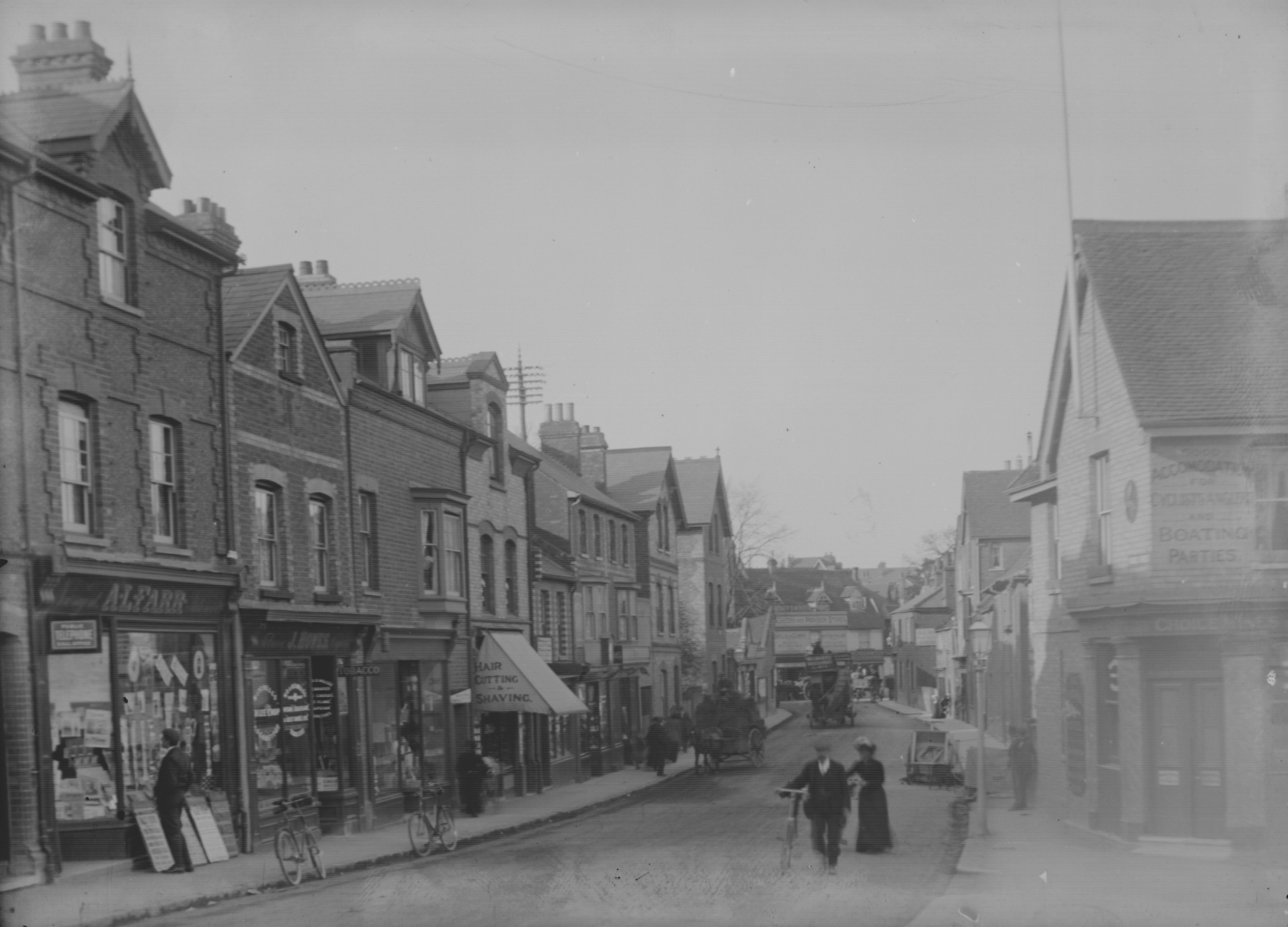
Bridge Street, looking north from Caversham Bridge c. 1905 by Henry Taunt

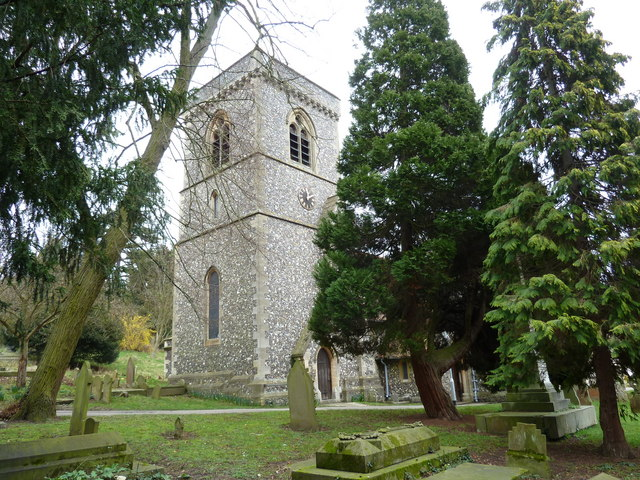
St Peter's Church

The first written description of Caversham as Cavesham appeared in the Domesday Book (1086) within the hundred of Binfield. This entry indicates that a sizeable community had developed with a considerable amount of land under cultivation. Robert de Montfort and Henry of Essex fought in front of Henry II under a bridge by the village. William Marshal, 1st Earl of Pembroke, who was the protector of Henry III, died in Caversham in the 13th century.

Some time before 1106 a shrine to the Virgin Mary was established in Caversham. Its precise location is unknown, but it may have been near the present St Peter's Church. It became a popular place of pilgrimage, along with the chapel of St. Anne on the bridge and her well, whose waters were believed to have healing properties. By the 15th century the statue was plated in silver and dressed in lifelike clothes with "cap and hair"; Catherine of Aragon is recorded as visiting here on 17 July 1532. The shrine was destroyed on 14 September 1538 under the command of Henry VIII. Only the well survives, now dry and surrounded by a protective wall, topped with a domed iron grill. A modern shrine to Our Lady has been re-established at the Roman Catholic Church of Our Lady and St. Anne.

In the Middle Ages Caversham Manor was one of the demesnes of William Marshal, Earl of Pembroke and regent during King Henry III's minority. It was the place of his death. The medieval community was clustered on the north side of Caversham Bridge east of St Peter's Church, which was built in the 12th century. The third Earl of Buckingham donated the land for the church and neighbouring rectory, together with a considerable amount of land around it, to the Augustinian Notley Abbey near Long Crendon in Buckinghamshire. After the Dissolution of the Monasteries, these lands were given to Christ Church. The rectory stood in what is now Caversham Court park and herb garden where there are remains with information panels and flat foundation stones as well as a ha ha wall below giving a view over the River Thames and much of Reading and Tilehurst.

In the Civil War there was fierce fighting around Caversham Bridge for a short time in April 1643. Reading had been held by Royalists and was besieged by a Parliamentary force under the Earl of Essex. Royalists marched south from Oxford to try to relieve the town's defenders but were heavily defeated, and the town fell to the Parliamentarians a few days later. The fortified manor house was replaced by Caversham House and Park in the 16th century. Several houses have stood on the site, notably the home of William Cadogan. The present Caversham Park House, built in 1850, was occupied by BBC Monitoring from 1943 until 2018, analysing news, information and comment gathered from mass media around the world. The BBC Written Archives Centre is still based on part of the site.

The southern part of the grounds of Caversham House was used as the site of the 1926 Royal Show, one of only two visits of the show to Reading. The following year, Henley Road Cemetery opened on part of the show site, and was joined by Reading Crematorium in 1932.

A Caversham pub, the Fox and Hounds, was the site in April 1960 of the only public performances of John Lennon and Paul McCartney as a duo, who were billed as "the Nerk Twins". A blue plaque marks the site today.

== Governance ==
Caversham is entirely within the borough of Reading and forms all or part of four of the borough's sixteen electoral wards: Caversham, Caversham Heights, Emmer Green and Thames wards. Caversham is in the Reading Central parliamentary constituency, currently represented by Matt Rodda of the Labour Party. The 2016 Boundary Commission review recommended moving one of Caversham's wards, Mapledurham, into the Reading West parliamentary constituency, but after consultation, this proposal was reverted in the 2018 recommendations.

=== Administrative history ===
Caversham was an ancient parish in the Binfield hundred of Oxfordshire. The parish historically extended from the banks of the Thames northwards into the Chiltern Hills, and included the area around Kidmore End. Kidmore End was made a separate ecclesiastical parish in 1853.

The reduced ecclesiastical parish of Caversham (excluding the Kidmore End ecclesiastical parish) was made a local government district in 1891. Such districts were reconstituted as urban districts in 1894. Also in 1894, the civil parish of Caversham was reduced to match the urban district, and Kidmore End became a separate civil parish.

Caversham Urban District was abolished in 1911, with the area becoming part of the county borough of Reading on 9 November 1911, except for the Caversham Park area, which was transferred instead to the neighbouring parish of Eye and Dunsden. This also had the effect of transferring Caversham from Oxfordshire to the geographical county of Berkshire. In 1911 the civil parish had a population of 9,858. Caversham had no council of its own after 1911, but was classed as an urban parish within the borough of Reading. The parish of Caversham was finally abolished on 1 April 1916, when the parish of Reading was enlarged to cover the whole borough. The Caversham Park area east of Caversham and part of the parish of Mapledurham west of Caversham were subsequently transferred into the borough of Reading in 1977.

== Geography ==
The shopping area and immediate residential surrounds that form Central Caversham are surrounded by more recent developments that form bolt-on additions to the suburb: Caversham Heights on the higher ground to the west, Lower Caversham to the south east, and Caversham Park Village to the north east on what was the parkland of Caversham Park. Emmer Green, to the north, is an older village but is generally considered part of Caversham. Elevations of homes vary from 37m above mean sea level to 92m at the top of Caversham Park, three metres short of the highest point in the east of the area. The bank of the river has the Thames Path National Trail except to the west of Caversham, where it reverses banks at Reading Bridge.

Between Mapledurham on the Thames and Caversham Heights, adjoining their respective golf courses is a western narrow outcrop of the northern foothills that reaches 95m AOD. The low Chiltern Hills on the north bank of the River Thames are therefore higher than the land on the opposite bank, providing wide views to the south. On the northern edge of Caversham is the Local nature reserve of Clayfield Copse. The Caversham village sign, carved by a local craftsman, is mounted on a tall Oak post in the village centre.

== Demography ==
Caversham including Emmer Green (the north bank) had: 22.1% of its homes being socially or privately rented in 2011, whereas the borough had 42.4%. This broad area had 20.4% of Reading's population and 23.5% of the borough, with the north bank's homes occupying 29.1% of the footprint of the whole borough's homes. It had 5.7% of the borough's non-domestic buildings footprint. The same figures (where Emmer Green is excluded from analysis) are that Caversham more narrowly defined, as is becoming more common, saw 24.8% of its homes rented against the borough's 42.4%, the same area had 15.3% of Reading's population and 16.4% of the borough's area with its homes occupying 20.6% of the footprint of the whole borough's homes. It had 4.3% of the borough's non-domestic buildings footprint.

At the 2011 census the proportion of homes that were rented as opposed to owned was close to 50% of the average for the borough. The area had 15.3% of Reading's population and 16.4% of the borough's area. In keeping with a suburb, in 2005 the Office for National Statistics land use statistics published with the census, Caversham had 4.3% of the non-domestic buildings. Almost wholly low rise where developed, its homes occupied 20.6% of the footprint of all homes in the borough.

2011 Census key statistics
Output area	Population	Homes	% Owned outright	% Owned with a loan	% Socially rented	% Privately rented	km^{2}	km^{2} Greenspace (Note: Comprises cultivated fields, woodland, pasture and public parks/common.)	km^{2} gardens	km^{2} road	domestic buildings	non-domestic buildings
Caversham	23,885	8,996	36.9%	43.9%	9.1%	15.7%	6.64	1.44	3.17	0.78	0.68	0.09
Caversham including Emmer Green	31,734	12,284	37.7%	42.9%	8.2%	13.9%	9.5	2.54	4.17	1.07	0.96	0.12
Borough of Reading	155,698	62,869	22.6%	32.2%	16.3%	26.1%	40.4	13.2	11.9	4.9	3.3	2.1

== Transport ==
Caversham Bridge, Reading Bridge, Christchurch Bridge, and Caversham Lock provide crossing points (the last two for pedestrians only), with Sonning Bridge also available a few miles east of Caversham. While Caversham does not have a railway station of its own, Reading railway station is a short walk from both Reading Bridge and Caversham Bridge.

== Education ==
There is one local authority secondary school in Caversham, Highdown School. Many children from the area also attend Maiden Erlegh Chiltern Edge in South Oxfordshire. In the independent sector, Queen Anne's School educates girls between the ages of 11 and 18. There is also Caversham Preparatory School, which takes children from ages 3 to 11. There are several primary schools in Caversham including Caversham Primary School, Caversham Park Primary School, Emmer Green Primary School, The Hill Primary School, St. Anne's RC Primary School, St. Martin's RC Primary School, Micklands Primary School and Thameside Primary School.

There was a shortage of primary school places in the west of Caversham, but a 2006 proposal to use part of Mapledurham playing fields to build a replacement for Caversham Primary School did not receive public support. A new Heights Primary School took its first pupils in September 2014 in temporary accommodation, and moved to its permanent site in a corner of Mapledurham Playing fields in 2021, overcoming local objections.

Caversham has several nursery schools, one of which, New Bridge Nursery School was assessed by Ofsted in 2011 as 'outstanding'.

Chiltern College, once a training school for childminders, now provides training in all aspects of child care, and claims to be the only childcare training college in the United Kingdom with its own nurseries, school, training college and residential accommodation on campus.

== Sport ==
Caversham AFC is one of the largest youth football clubs in the area with many of its girls' and boys' youth teams competing in the top divisions of local leagues. Caversham AFC's main ground is Clayfield Copse, commonly referred to as "Swan's Lair" because the mascot for the team is a swan. In previous seasons, Highdown School has been used as Caversham AFC's training ground. The club colours are red and black. Their main rivals are Caversham Trents FC who also have boys teams competing in many of the same divisions as their AFC counterparts who are also known to use Highdown School as their training ground. The club colours are blue and white and their main ground is Mapledurham Playing Fields. The Albert Road recreation ground offers facilities for tennis, croquet, and bowls.

The Redgrave Pinsent Rowing Lake, part of the Caversham Lakes, has served as the main training facility of the GB rowing team since its opening in 2006. The lake is also used by crews of Oxford University Boat Club in preparation for the Boat Race.

== Religious sites ==
There are many Anglican churches in the Caversham area. St Peter's is the parish church of the Caversham, Thameside, and Mapledurham parish, which also includes St John's and St Margaret's, in the neighbouring Mapledurham village. There are also two Methodist Churches, the Catholic church of Our Lady and St. Anne, Caversham Baptist Church, Grace Church Caversham (which is part of Newfrontiers, and the Pentecostal New Testament Church of God. Caversham Park Village Church meets in Caversham Park Primary School each Sunday and is an ecumenical project made up of Anglicans, Baptists and Methodists. Finally, Caversham Evangelical Church meets at the Youth and Community Centre in Emmer Green.

== Notable people ==
- William Cadogan, 1st Earl Cadogan
- William Marshal
- Fran Kirby
- Liz Mitchell
- Valerie Eliot
- Patrick Malahide
- John Wicks (singer)
- Yasmina Siadatan
- Babita Sharma
- Dean Webb
- Jill Pitkeathley, Baroness Pitkeathley

== See also ==
- Caversham, New Zealand a suburb of Dunedin named after Caversham
