= William F. Paul =

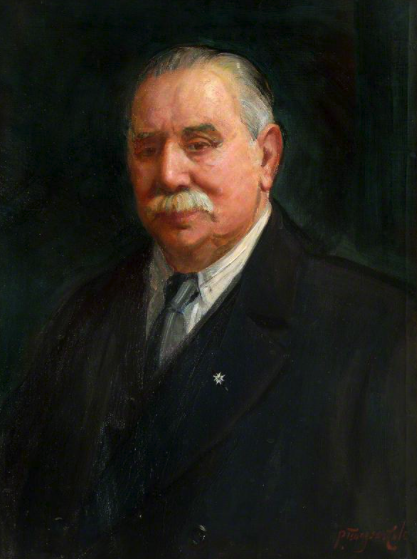
William F. Paul by Tennyson Cole

William Francis Paul (1850 – 4 April 1928) was a business man in Ipswich, Suffolk who was active in politics and became a benefactor to the town.

William was born in Ipswich in 1850, son of Robert Paul, a corn merchant, and his wife Elizabeth (Woods). When his father died in 1864, William and his brother Robert S. Paul inherited their father's business following a period when it was administered by their maternal uncles. This firm later became known as R. & W. Paul Ltd.

Paul established the William Paul Housing Trust, an Almshouse with 80 properties in Ipswich. The Anchor Hanover Group was the sole trustee in 2022.
