= Tennyson Cole =

English painter

- Born: 30 May 1862; London, England
- Died: 2 September 1939 (aged 77)
- Occupations: Society portrait painter in both oils and watercolours
- Notable work: Portraits of the Governor and Lady Hamilton, Duke of Norfolk, Edward VII, George V, Lord Kitchener of Khartoum
- Spouse: Alice Mary Saintsbury (m. 1885; div. 1894)

Philip Tennyson Cole (30 May 1862 – 2 September 1939), generally known as Tennyson Cole, was an English society portrait painter in both oils and watercolours, who first achieved fame in Australasia and South Africa.

== Biography ==
Cole was born into a family of artists in London in 1862. As a young boy, Cole received training in art from his father, who was himself a successful painter. He may have been related to George Vicat Cole. He was educated at Chiswick College in Middlesex and had his first exhibition in London by age 20.

Around the age of 19, he fell in love with Alice Mary Saintsbury, an actress, whom he married in 1885, supporting him financially.

He sailed to Tasmania, arriving in the Doric in 1889. During the voyage he painted his female companion, a fine contralto who called herself Madame Cole, and several fellow passengers. After a year's stay in Hobart, having completed a good many commissions to general acclaim, including a fine pair of portraits of the Governor and Lady Hamilton, which were presented to the Art Gallery of Tasmania, he moved to Melbourne. In October 1892, while visiting New Zealand, he was charged in Auckland with deserting his wife in England some three years before. He was ordered to pay his wife support of £1 per week.

He left Australia from Adelaide aboard the Ormus in September 1893. His erstwhile wife died in Sydney on 7 April 1894. In August 1895 the (yet to be inaugurated) Perth Art Gallery was donated his portrait of Sir George Grey. In May 1896 he was working in South Africa. In 1900 he was touring the African interior. The following year he was back in England and the Royal Academy had an exhibition which included his portrait of the Duke of Norfolk. In 1902 commissions included Lord Milner and Cecil Rhodes. In 1908 he was granted a series of sittings by the King. He spent part of the World War I years as a guest of an Indian Maharajah; he died in Tooting Bec Hospital.

== Selected works ==
=== In Great Britain ===
Held in various public collections; listed at Art UK – Your Paintings

- Alderman Lieutenant Colonel Clifford Probyn, Mayor of Westminster (1901–1902) painted 1902
- Alderman William F. Paul, Mayor of Ipswich
- Cecil John Rhodes et nos fas extera quaerere regna
- Cecil Rhodes (1853–1902) painted 1902
- Charles Alexander Buckmaster painted 1936
- Charles Richard John Spencer-Churchill (1871–1934), 9th Duke of Marlborough
- Duke of Norfolk, 1st Mayor of Westminster (1900–1901)
- Edward VII (1841–1910) painted ca.1908
- General Sir Edmund Allenby (1861–1936), KCB painted ca.1918
- George V (1865–1936) painted ca.1915
- King Edward VII painted 1907
- King Edward VII (1841–1910) painted 1907
- Lord Kitchener of Khartoum (1850–1916) painted ca.1913
- Major General the Right Honourable Lord Cheylesmore, Mayor of Westminster (1904–1906) painted 1906
- Mayor Councillor Viscount Doneraile, Mayor of Westminster (1919–1920) painted 1920
- Owen Cosby Philipps, 1st Baron Kylsant, MP painted 1920
- Portrait of a Governor painted 1898
- Sir Alfred F. Robbins (1856–1931), journalist, Freemason and Freeman
- Sir John Hunt, Town Clerk of the City of Westminster painted 1931
- Sir William Treloar (1843–1923), Lord Mayor of London (1906) painted 1907
- William Mansfield (1855–1921), 1st Viscount Sandhurst
- Violet, Marchioness of Donegall and her son Edward painted 1907 Peerage website

=== South Africa ===
- Sir Thomas Upington South African History Online

=== Australia ===
- Portraits of Sir Robert and Lady Hamilton, painted in 1890, were donated to the Tasmanian Art Gallery.
- Hon. Peter Lalor as Speaker held by Ballarat Art Gallery

== Bibliography ==
- Cole, P. Tennyson Vanity Varnished; Reminiscences in Many Colours 1931 London: Hutchinson & Co.
