= Anchor Hanover Group =

Elderly care provider in England

- Predecessor: Anchor (housing association) and Hanover Housing Association
- Founded: England, 2018
- Headquarters: Bradford, England, UK
- Region served: England
- Key people: Rachael Shimmin, Chief Executive; Princess Alexandra, Patron
- Website: https://www.anchor.org.uk/

Anchor Hanover Group, trading as Anchor, is the largest provider of specialist housing and care for older people in England. It was formed in November 2018 when Anchor Trust and Hanover Housing Association merged. Its main office is in Bradford.

== Merger ==
The proposed merger was first announced in May 2018. Anchor Trust then employed 9,269 people and Hanover Housing Association 753. The combined operation provides 54,000 homes for older people across almost 1,700 sites, employs more than 10,000 people, and operates in more than 90% of local councils in England.

== Services ==
- Retirement properties for rent with a range of properties across England, mostly affordable flats with some bungalows. Each site has access to a 24-hour emergency call system.
- Retirement properties to buy – a portfolio of leasehold estates with the individual owning the property where Anchor Hanover provides a property management service. The newly built properties include luxury retirement villages and leasehold apartments with high end communal facilities such as hair and beauty salons, coffee shops, lounges and landscaped gardens.
- Extra care housing with self-contained accommodation alongside an on-site care team.
- More than 100 residential care homes across England offering everything from respite stays to specialist dementia care.

In November 2018, after gaining its eighth CQC ‘outstanding rating’, it became the UK care home provider with the most CQC ‘outstanding’ ratings

In October 2020 it announced a partnership with McCarthy & Stone which is to produce 482 units across five sites, owned by McCarthy & Stone, which have a gross development value of £125 million Anchor will pay £67 million for the development of 316 extra care apartments, aimed at those in greatest need. 124 will be affordable rent and 192 will be shared ownership.166 retirement living units will be sold and managed by McCarthy & Stone on adjacent land. The sites are in Hook, Hart, Hinckley, Bingley, Standish, Greater Manchester and Macclesfield.

In October 2021, Anchor Hanover Group began using the trade name Anchor for all its services.

== Governance ==
The organisation is a charitable housing association registered as a society under the Co-operative and Community Benefit Societies Act 2014, and its patron is Princess Alexandra, governed by a non-executive board and an executive board. It is regulated by the Care Quality Commission and the Regulator of Social Housing.

The former chief executive, Jane Ashcroft, was awarded the Outstanding Contribution to Social Care award at the Great British Care Home Awards 2010 in recognition of her "...[leading] the agenda on developing quality care services across the continuum of care." She also topped a high-profile list of the most influential people in social care at the Care Talk Awards 2012, and in 2018, for the second year running, won the prestigious Grand Prix award at the HealthInvestor ‘Power 50’ ceremony which celebrates and recognises the industry's most influential leaders. Ashcroft is a trustee of The Silver Line, a helpline for older people, vice chair of Associated Retirement Community Operators, and also vice chair of the National Housing Federation. She was appointed a CBE in the Queens 2014 New Year Honours List. In June 2022 Anchor announced that Sarah Jones, then the Finance Director, would replace Jane Ashcroft on 1 August and Chief Executive. Rachel McVeigh has been appointed Finance Director

== Sustainability ==
Along with four other housing associations – Abri, Home Group, Hyde and Sanctuary – Anchor Hanover is part of the Greener Futures Partnership (GFP). The GFP collectively owns 300,000 homes and members collaborate to improve energy efficiency and develop decarbonisation solutions.

== Trusteeships ==
The Anchor Hanover Group acts as trustee for a number of charities:

- William Paul Housing Trust (80 properties in Ipswich)
- The Flood Charity
- The Margaret Jane Ashley Almshouse Charity
- Collins Memorial Trust
- Almshouse Charity of Elizabeth Smith
- Alfred Stubbs Trust
