= Clayfield Copse and Blackhouse Woods =

Local nature reserve in Caversham, Reading, UK

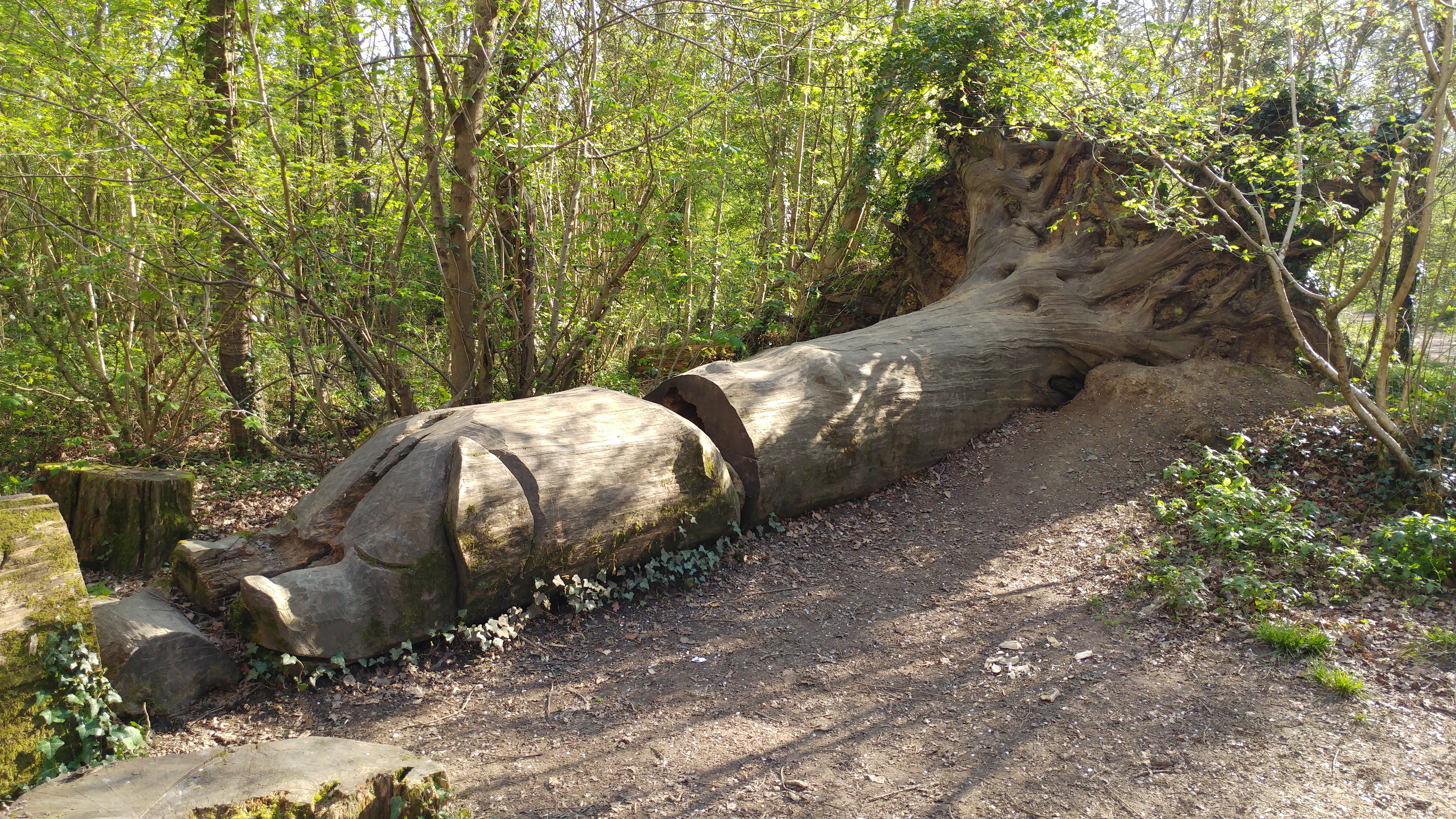
- Pig Sculpture from fallen tree in Clayfield Copse in April 2017

- Location within Reading, Berkshire
- Interactive map of Clayfield Copse and Blackhouse Woods
- Type: Local nature reserve
- Location: Caversham, Reading, UK
- Coordinates: 51°29′19″N 0°57′25″W
- Area: 8.65 hectares (21.4 acres)
- Created: 1991

Clayfield Copse and Blackhouse Woods is a local nature reserve on the northern edge of the suburb of Caversham in Reading, England. The nature reserve is under the management of the Reading Borough Council.

The site is 8.65 hectares (21.4 acres) in size and is a natural open space consisting of fields, wild flower meadow and native woodlands adjoining the Oxfordshire countryside. Some of the woodland is being actively managed as hazel coppice, and traditional dead hedging defines some of the ancient woodland areas.

The site is the only outcrop of London Clay north of the River Thames in Reading and makes up the southern tip of the Chiltern Hills.

The site also features a sculpture trail.

== History ==
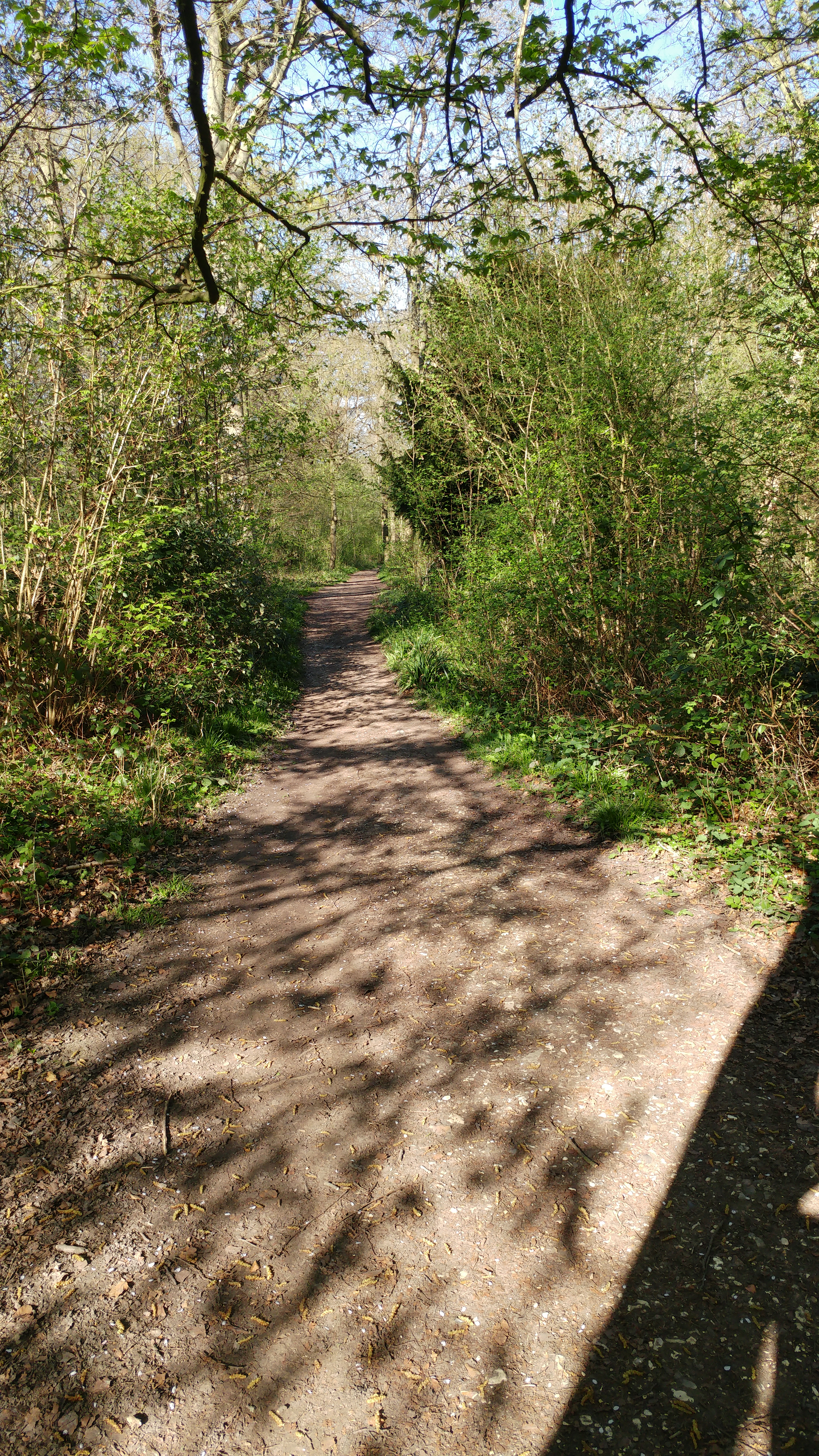
Clayfield Copse in April 2017

Clayfield Copse used to be part of the country house estate of Caversham Park. In 1991, the site was designated a local nature reserve, making it Reading's first such reserve.

== Fauna ==
The site has the following fauna:

=== Birds ===
- Picus viridis
- Eurasian golden oriole

== Flora ==
The site has the following flora:

=== Trees ===
- Taxus baccata
- Cedrus libani
- Malus sylvestris
- Prunus avium
- Pyrus pyraster
- Prunus spinosa
- Sorbus aucuparia
- Sorbus torminalis
- Corylus avellana
- Betula pendula
- Carpinus betulus

=== Plants ===
- Anemone nemorosa
- Ranunculus auricomus
- Ranunculus ficaria
- Viola reichenbachiana
- Viola riviniana
- Alliaria petiolata
- Cardamine pratensis
- Lunaria annua
- Primula veris
- Primula vulgaris
- Ribes rubrum
- Euphorbia amygdaloides
- Mercurialis perennis
- Geranium robertianum
- Sanicula europaea
- Symphytum orientale
- Stachys sylvatica
- Glechoma hederacea
- Veronica hederifolia
- Veronica montana
- Scrophularia nodosa
- Lonicera periclymenum
- Hyacinthoides non-scripta
- Ruscus aculeatus
- Cornus sanguinea
- Daphne laureola
- Melica nutans
- Carex pendula
- Carex sylvatica

=== Fungi ===
- Daldinia concentrica

== See also ==
- List of parks and open spaces in Reading, Berkshire
