= Boundary commission =

A boundary commission is a legal entity that determines borders of nations, states, constituencies.

Notable boundary commissions have included:

- Afghan Boundary Commission, an Anglo-Russian Boundary Commission, of 1885 and 1893, delineated the northern frontier of Afghanistan.
- Anglo-Turkish Boundary Commission of 1902–1905, delineated the border between Yemen and the Aden Protectorate.
- Boundary commissions (United Kingdom) of the United Kingdom
- Boundary Commission (Ireland) between the United Kingdom and Ireland
- Boundary Commission of India, electoral boundary commission of India
- Boundary Commission (Pacific Northwest) of the Pacific Northwest
- Boundary Commission (Maine) of Maine
- Boundary Commission (Alaska Panhandle) of the Alaska Panhandle
- Boundary Commissions (Netherlands) of Indonesia
- Comisión de Límites, the Mexican Boundary Commission after the Adams–Onís Treaty
- International Boundary and Water Commission, for the US–Mexico border
- Canada–United States International Boundary Commission, for the Canada–US border
- Local Government Boundary Commission for England
