= Caversham Park Village =

Coordinates: 51.482933°N 0.951262°W

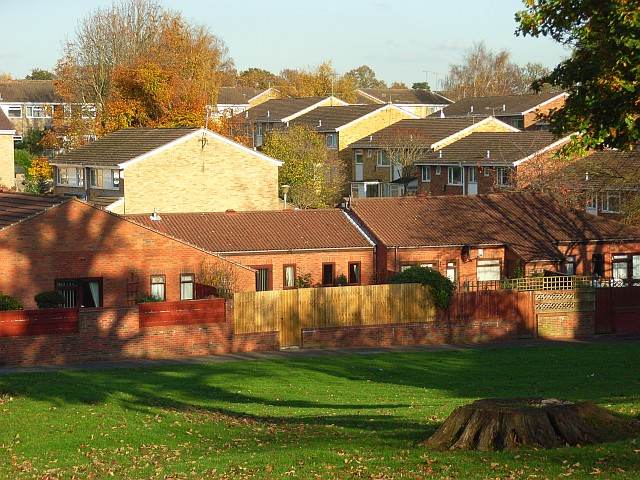
- Houses in Caversham Park Village

- Location within Berkshire
- OS grid reference: SU728765
- Unitary authority: Reading
- Ceremonial county: Berkshire
- Region: South East
- Country: England
- Sovereign state: United Kingdom
- Post town: READING
- Postcode district: RG4
- Dialling code: 0118
- Police: Thames Valley
- Fire: Royal Berkshire
- Ambulance: South Central
- UK Parliament: Reading Central

Caversham Park Village is a suburban neighbourhood of Reading in Berkshire, England. It is predominantly a residential area and is sometimes associated with the nearby neighbourhood of Emmer Green. Both form part of Caversham, a village and suburb that was once an independent town on the north bank of the River Thames opposite Reading.

Whilst Caversham Park Village has no formal boundaries, it generally refers to the residential area constructed on part of the former grounds of Caversham Park House, to the eastern side of Caversham and adjoining the border with Oxfordshire. Caversham Park House was previously occupied by BBC Monitoring and BBC Radio Berkshire. It is a grade II listed building. Plans to use the building as a care home were approved in 2024.

== History ==
The village was largely developed between the mid 1960s and early 1970s, with the construction of 1,500 new houses and the supporting road infrastructure, such as Galsworthy Drive and Milestone Way. The development was managed by Davis Estates in an area that was 180 acres. The original brochure emphasises making the area a complete community.

== Government ==
Unlike most of the rest of Caversham, which became part of Reading in 1911, Caversham Park Village remained in Oxfordshire until 1977, when the boundaries were redrawn to include it in Reading and it was transferred to Berkshire.Today it forms part of the Borough of Reading, administered by Reading Borough Council. It is within the borough's Emmer Green ward and the Reading Central parliamentary constituency.

== Community ==
Caversham is home to community drama group Caversham Park Theatre, which is based in The Milestone Centre. Caversham Park Village Association, a charity, run a social club at the centre, with activities such as yoga, dance, darts, bridge, badminton, table tennis, squash and archery. The centre also has a cafe.
