= The Heathland School =

Location
- Wellington Road South; Hounslow, London, TW4 5JD; England; 51.457831°N 0.376193°W

Information
- Type: Community
- Motto: Commitment to Excellence
- Local authority: Hounslow
- Department for Education URN: 102539 Tables
- Ofsted: Reports
- Headmaster: J Mike Rose
- Gender: Mixed
- Age: 11 to 18
- Enrolment: 1,865(2024)
- Website: http://www.heathland.hounslow.sch.uk

The Heathland School is an 11–18 co-educational community school located in the London Borough of Hounslow. As a comprehensive school, the Heathland School provides a broad general education for girls and boys.

== Curriculum ==
It has a traditional curriculum based on academic subjects, taught by well qualified staff. Pupils are placed in teaching sets from Year 7 for core subjects according to their ability in each subject with the exception of art, drama, information and communications technology (taught in sets according to tutor group), music, physical education and religious education. Pupils are taught in their tutor groups in these subjects.

Homework is an integral part of pupils' learning and pupils in all years receive regular, set homework. All pupils study religious education to GCSE standard as either short or full courses and the great majority of pupils study ten subjects at GCSE.

The sixth form is the largest in Hounslow, enabling it to offer a wide range of A-level courses in addition to vocational, BTEC Courses. Approximately 90% of the upper sixth students take up places at university.

The 2024 inspection report by Ofsted graded the school an overall "outstanding", with a "good" in "behaviour and attitudes".
