= Caversham Park =

Country house in Southern England

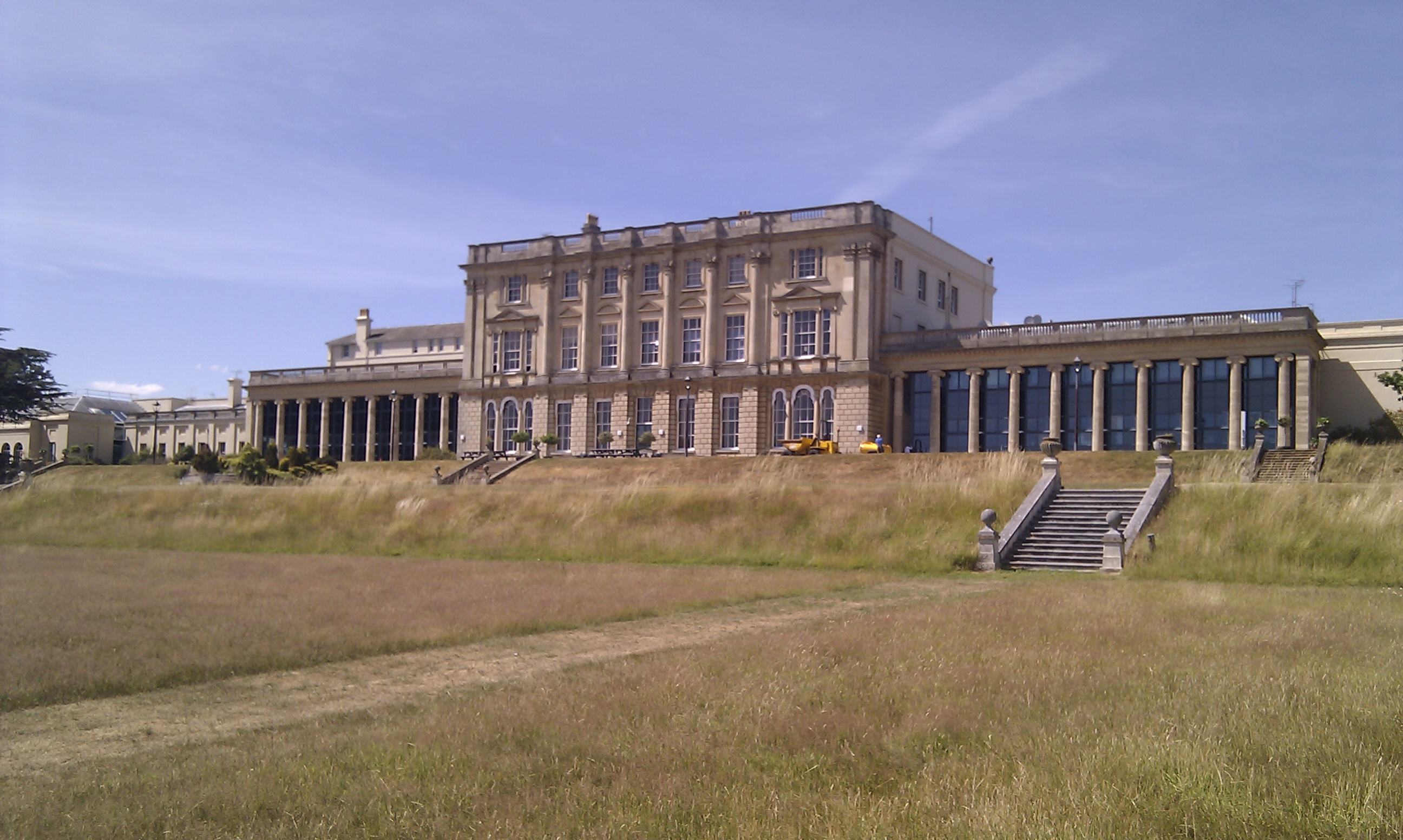
- View from the south east, 2011

- Location within Reading, Berkshire
- Former names: Caversham Manor; BBC Monitoring

General information
- Status: Grade II listed
- Type: Stately home
- Architectural style: Neoclassical
- Location: Caversham, Berkshire, England
- Coordinates: 51.4805°N 0.9574°W
- Construction started: 1850
- Client: William Crawshay II
- Owner: Beechcroft Developments Ltd

Design and construction
- Architect: Horace Jones

Website
- caversham-park.co.uk

Caversham Park is a Victorian-era stately home with parkland in the suburb of Caversham on the outskirts of Reading, England. Historically located in Oxfordshire, it became part of Berkshire with boundary changes in 1977. Caversham Park was home to BBC Monitoring and BBC Radio Berkshire. The park is listed as Grade II in the English Heritage Register of Historic Parks and Gardens.

== Early history ==
The history of Caversham Park goes back to at least Norman times, when Walter Giffard, a distant relative of William the Conqueror, was given the estate after the 1066 conquest. The estate, then Caversham Manor, was a fortified manor house or castle, probably nearer the Thames than the present house. The estate was registered in the Domesday Book, in an entry describing a property of 9.7 square kilometres (2,400 acres) worth £20. The estate passed to William Marshal, Earl of Pembroke and Protector of the Realm, in the late 12th century. Marshal, who in his final years acted as de facto regent under the reign of a young Henry III, died in Caversham Park in 1219.

Later it was occupied by the Earls of Warwick. In 1542, it was bought by Sir Francis Knollys, the treasurer of Queen Elizabeth I. However, he did not move there until over forty years later, when he completely rebuilt the house slightly to the north. Sir Francis' son, William Knollys, the Earl of Banbury, entertained Queen Elizabeth I and Queen Anne of Denmark here.

A description of an entertainment at Caversham for Anne of Denmark in April 1613, written by Thomas Campion, was printed in 1613. She was met by a "Cynic" dressed as a wildman who debated with a "Traveller" in elaborate costume. Those two rode the short distance to the park gate and were met by two park keepers and two of Robin Hood's men, who sang for the queen in her coach. The entertainment continued in the hall of the house after dinner and concluded with masque dancing.

Later Caversham became home to the Royalist Earl of Craven. During the Civil War, the house was confiscated and used to imprison Charles I. Following the Civil War, the Elizabethan manor house was demolished because of its poor state of repair, and rebuilt by Lord Craven after 1660, probably employing William Winde as the architect. The estate was sold in 1697, passing by the 1720s into the hands of William, first Baron, and later Earl, Cadogan (d 1726).

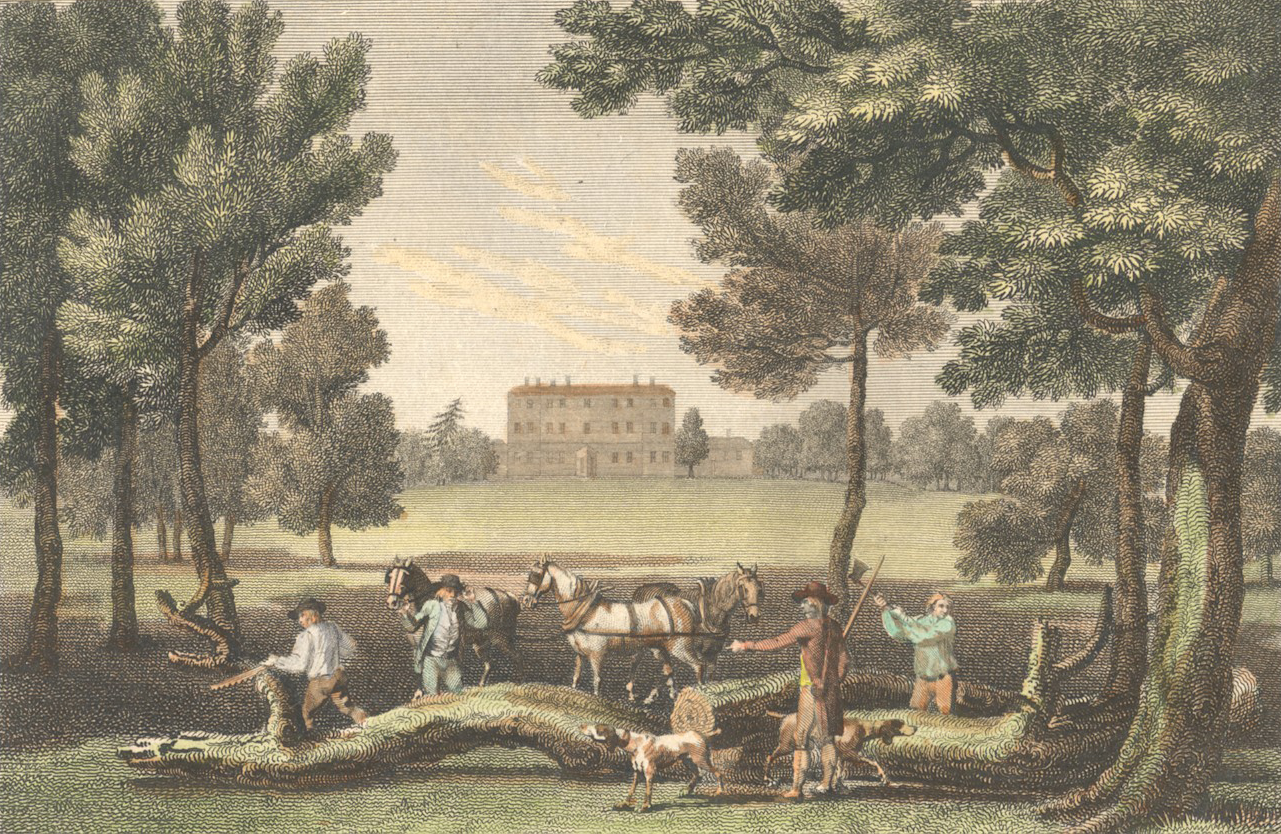
Print of Caversham Park in 1790–1799 by W. and J. Walker

William Cadogan, 1st Earl Cadogan started to have the house rebuilt in 1718. A friend of the Duke of Marlborough, he tried to rival the gardens at Blenheim Palace. A plan of the 1723 design was published by Colen Campbell in Vitruvius Britannicus III (1725).

The house burned down in the late 18th century and was replaced with a smaller house. That was enlarged by Major Charles Marsack in the 1780s, in the Greek temple style, with an impressive Corinthian colonnade. Marsack was High Sheriff of Oxfordshire for 1787. In 1850, that house also burnt down.

== Garden ==
In his Observations on Modern Gardening of 1770, Thomas Whately described the approach to Lord Cadogan's Caversham as exemplary, an artful solution to its restrictive setting "confined within a narrow valley, without views, buildings or water", He praises the unequivocal statement of being a road to a grand house: "The approach to Caversham, though a mile in length, and not once in sight of the house, till close upon it, yet can never be mistaken for any other way than it is". "Crossing the whole breadth of a lovely valley; the road is conducted along the bottom, continually winding in natural easy sweeps, and presenting at every bend some new scene to the view ... insensibly ascending, all the way". It finally "rises under a thick wood in the garden up to the house, where it suddenly bursts out upon a rich, and extensive prospect, with the town and the churches of Reading full in sight, and the hills of Windsor forest in the horizon."

In April 1786, Thomas Jefferson, the future third President of the United States, visited Caversham Park and other places described in Whately's treatise in search of inspirations for his own gardens at Monticello and other architectural projects. An astute observer, Jefferson's account in his Notes of a Tour of English Gardens reads like this:

"Caversham. Sold by Ld. Cadogan to Majr. Marsac. 25. as. of garden, 400. as. of park, 6 as. of kitchen garden. A large lawn, separated by a sunk fence from the garden, appears to be part of it. A straight broad gravel walk passes before the front and parallel to it, terminated on the right by a Doric temple, and opening at the other end on a fine prospect. This straight walk has an ill effect. The lawn in front, which is pasture, well disposed with clumps of trees."

Jefferson undertook the tour in the company of John Adams, his close friend and predecessor as US president. Adams' observations are far more general. However, he gives a fuller account of the route they were taking: "Mr. Jefferson and myself went in a post-chaise to Woburn farm, Caversham, Wotton, Stowe, Edgehill, Stratford upon Avon, Birmingham, the Leasowes, Hagley, Stourbridge, Worcester, Woodstock, Blenheim, Oxford, High Wycombe, and back to Grosvenor Square... The gentlemen's seats were the highest entertainment we met with. Stowe, Hagley, and Blenheim, are superb; Woburn, Caversham, and the Leasowes are beautiful. Wotton is both great and elegant, though neglected". He was damning about the means used to finance the large estates, and he did not think that the embellishments to the landscape, made by the owners of the great English country houses, would suit the more rugged American countryside.

== Current building ==
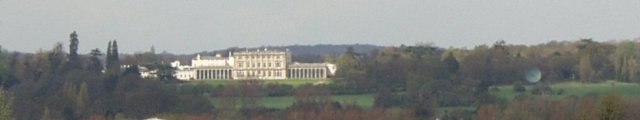
Caversham Park from the distance (also note the BBC satellite dish on the right)

The present building, inspired by Italian baroque palaces, was erected after a fire in 1850 by architect Horace Jones, who much later also designed London's Tower Bridge. Its then owner William Crawshay II, an ironmaster nicknamed the 'Iron King', had the house rebuilt over an iron frame, an early example for this technique. Jones inserted his seven-bay block between two colonnades of 1840 by John Thistlewood Crew (called J. T. Crews by Pevsner and English Heritage) which apparently survived the fire.

During the First World War, part of the building was used as a convalescent home for wounded soldiers. In 1923, The Oratory School bought the house and about 120 hectares (300 acres) of the estate's remaining 730 hectares (1,800 acres). The principal of the school was Edward Pereira. The legacy of the estate's days as a school remains with a chapel building and graves for three boys, one of whom died during World War II in 1940, the other two having died from accident and sickness in the 1920s.

Caversham Park had been part of the ancient parish of Caversham, but was transferred to the neighbouring parish of Eye and Dunsden in 1911 when the more built up part of Caversham was transferred into the borough of Reading. The southern part of the grounds of Caversham House was used as the site of the 1926 Royal Show, one of only two visits of the show to Reading. The following year, Henley Road Cemetery opened on part of the show site, and was joined by Reading Crematorium in 1932.

The residential area of Caversham Park Village was developed in the 1960s on some of the parkland. The Local nature reserve Clayfield Copse was part of the land belonging to Caversham Park. Caversham Park and the surrounding development were subsequently transferred from the parish of Eye and Dunsden in Oxfordshire to the borough of Reading in Berkshire in 1977.

When approaching Reading via the A3290 (formerly part of the A329(M) motorway) northbound near the A4 junction, Caversham Park is a clearly visible landmark dominating the wooded hill on the opposite side of the Thames.

=== BBC Monitoring ===
BBC Monitoring Listening Room, 2000

With the onset of the Second World War, the British Ministry of Health requisitioned Caversham Park, and initially intended to convert it into a hospital. However, the BBC purchased the property with government grant-in-aid funds and, in the spring of 1943, moved its Monitoring Service into the premises from Wood Norton Hall, near Evesham in Worcestershire. The nearby estate of Crowsley Park was acquired by the BBC at the same time, to act as the service's receiving station and continues to function in that role. In 1945, 1,000 people were working at the site.

In major building works in the 1980s, Norman Lucey, Architect for the BBC Architectural & Civil Engineering Department, restored the interior of the mansion, removed utilitarian brick buildings put up on the east side of the mansion during the war, converted the orangery (then being used as a canteen) into editorial offices, and built a large new west wing to house the listening room. That included a new glazed atrium facing the original stable block. A new east wing was built in the 1990s. A further major building project in 2007–08 saw the west wing converted to house all of Monitoring's operational staff.

A large 10-metre (33 ft) diameter satellite dish was erected in the grounds in the early 1980s. It was later painted green (rather than white) to reduce its obtrusiveness. Shortwave aerials in front of the house were removed.

In the 1980s, the formal name of the service was shortened to "BBC Monitoring".

In 2016, it was announced that BBC Monitoring would move to London, with the loss of a number of jobs. In late 2017, the BBC announced it was selling the Grade II-listed Caversham Park estate in an effort to save money on property costs. In November 2018, the BBC finally left Caversham Park, after 75 years.

=== Development ===
Approval was granted in 2024 to re-develop the stately home, to become assisted living homes and other types of residential properties.

== See also ==
- List of parks and open spaces in Reading, Berkshire

== Sources ==
- Adams, John; Adams, Charles Francis (1851), The Works of John Adams, Second President of the United States: Autobiography, continued. Diary. Essays and controversial papers of the Revolution, The Works of John Adams, Second President of the United States, vol. 3, Little, Brown, p. 394
- Jefferson, Thomas (2008), Oberg, Barbara B.; Looney, J. Jefferson (eds.), The Papers of Thomas Jefferson (Digital ed.), Charlottesville: University of Virginia Press, Rotunda, p. 370
- Whately, Thomas (1770), "Chapters XLV & XLVI", Observations on Modern Gardening (Second ed.), London: T. Payne, pp. 138–144
