= Great House at Sonning =

Hotel and restaurant in Berkshire, England

Coordinates: 51.47554°N 0.91312°W

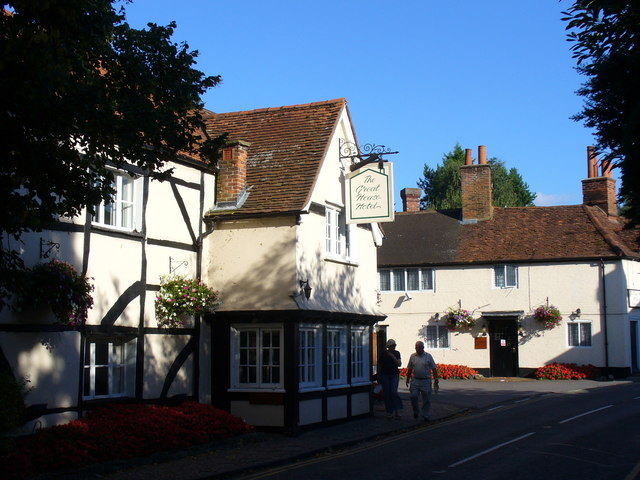
The Great House at Sonning from the road.

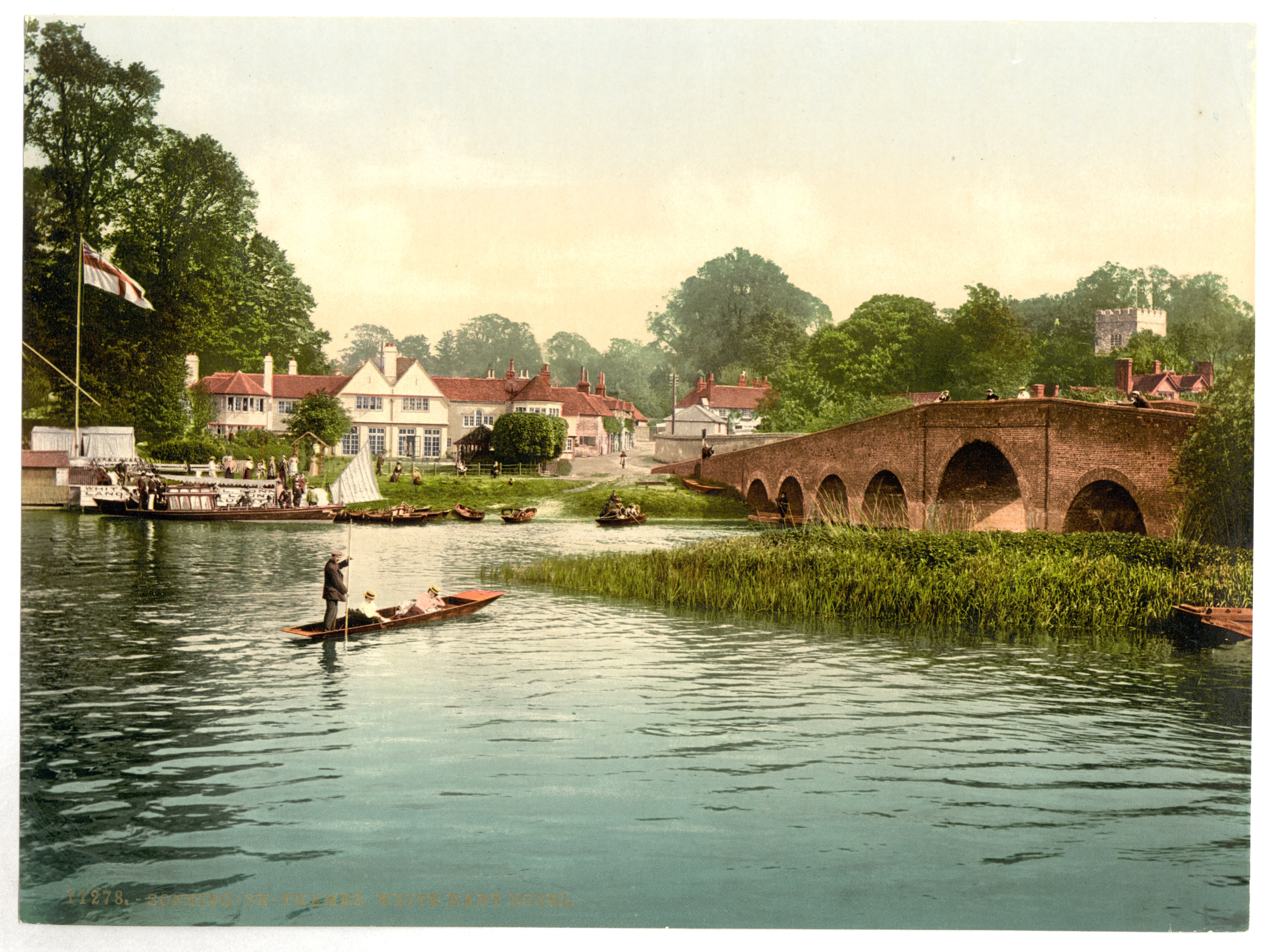
Historic view from the other side of the River Thames of the White Hart with Sonning Bridge to the right.

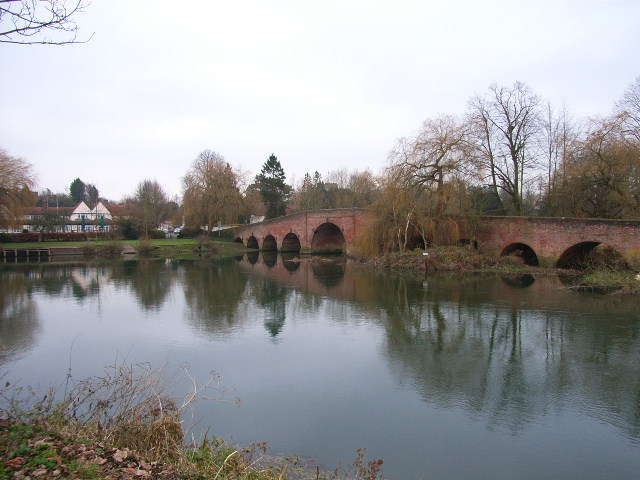
Modern view of the Great House on the left and Sonning Bridge on the right from the opposite bank of the River Thames.

The Great House at Sonning (formerly the White Hart public house) is a hotel and restaurant with a riverside garden on the River Thames near Sonning Bridge at Sonning, Berkshire, England. It is possible for patrons to moor along the towpath running past the hotel on the river.

It was formerly a public house, known as the White Hart because King Richard II's wife, Isabella of Valois was kept prisoner at the Bishop's Palace in the village after his death and his badge was a White Hart. In 1989, the original White Hart was combined with The Red House, previously a private home on Lee's Hill where the dramatist Sir Terence Rattigan resided during 1945–47, to become The Great House.

About 150 metres East on the opposite side of the B478 road are Deanery Garden and St Andrew's Church. Close by, just over Sonning Bridge, is The Mill at Sonning, now a dinner theatre. On the opposite Oxfordshire bank of the Thames is another riverside hotel and restaurant, the French Horn.

== See also ==
- The Bull at Sonning
