= Sunna (Saxon chief) =

Saxon chief

Sunna was a Saxon chief whose people were widespread in eastern Berkshire, southern England. A number of English place names are derived from this name, including Sonning (historically spelled "Sunning"), Sonning Eye, Sunbury, Sunningdale, Sunninghill and Sunningwell, many close to the River Thames.

One historian notes that "Sunbury may be named after Sunna, the eponymous founder of the provincia quae appellatur Sunninges, whose territory lay in Berkshire west of the lands granted to Chertsey in the mid-670s". A historian of Wessex has commented "The Sunna of Sonning and related names... was clearly a local potentate of no small importance". Searle's Onomasticon Anglo-Saxonicum finds that Sunna was a rare personal name.

However, a 1937 theory held that "The meaning of sunna is likely to be wet or marshy land...[as] in Sonning, h[undre]d. and par[ish] ... near Reading, and in Sunninghill in south-east Berkshire".
