= Bull Inn, Sonning =

Historic public house in Berkshire, England

The Bull Inn
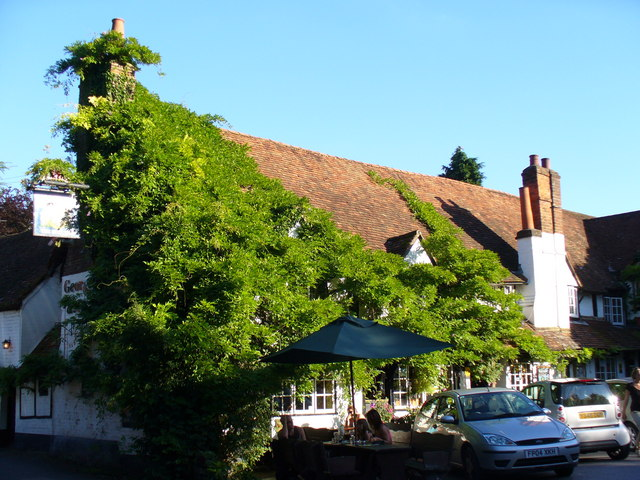
- The Bull Inn in 2007

- Location within Berkshire

General information
- Location: High Street, Sonning, Berkshire, England
- Coordinates: 51°28′25″N 0°54′42″W
- Current tenants: Fuller's Brewery
- Owner: St Andrew's Church

Website
- www.bullinnsonning.co.uk

Listed Building – Grade II*
- Official name: The Bull Hotel
- Designated: 26 January 1967
- Reference no.: 1117462

The Bull Inn, also known as The Bull at Sonning or just The Bull, is a historic public house — now also a restaurant and hotel — in the centre of the village of Sonning in Berkshire, England.

== Overview ==
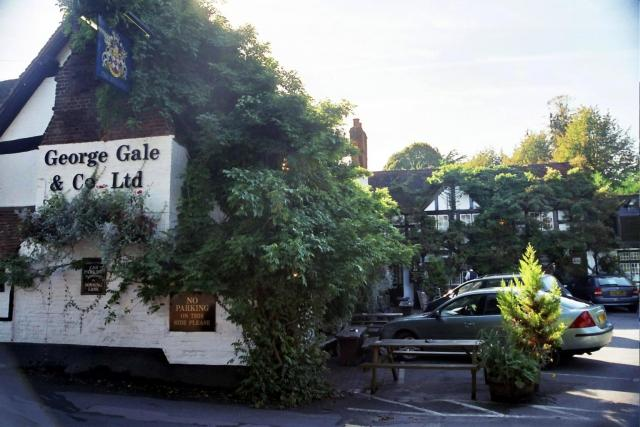
The Bull Inn when owned by George Gale & Co Ltd.

Traditionally, the Bull was owned by the Bishop of Salisbury, whose palace once stood nearby. Today it is owned by St Andrew's Church, who currently rent it to Fuller's Brewery. The present 16th-century timber-framed building, it is suggested, was a hospitium for pilgrims visiting the relics of the mysterious St Sarik at the adjoining St Andrew's Church. The name stems from bulls which supported the coat of arms of Sir Henry Neville. He was steward at the palace after it was sold to Queen Elizabeth I. The inn was featured in Jerome K. Jerome's 1889 book Three Men in a Boat:

If you stop at Sonning, put up at the "Bull," behind the church. It is a veritable picture of an old country inn, with green, square courtyard in front, where, on seats beneath the trees, the old men group of an evening to drink their ale and gossip over village politics; with low, quaint rooms and latticed windows, and awkward stairs and winding passages.

The two-storey timber-framed building dates from the late 16th century with 19th/20th century additions. It was Grade II* listed in 1967. Opposite is a well-hidden Lutyens-designed house, Deanery Garden.

Customers have included the American film star George Clooney and his British wife, the human rights lawyer Amal Clooney, who purchased the Mill House in Sonning Eye, just over the River Thames from Sonning, in 2014.

== See also ==
- Grade II* listed buildings in Berkshire
- Great House at Sonning
- Sonning Bishop's Palace
- The Barley Mow, Clifton Hampden, also mentioned in Three Men in a Boat
