= Sonning Backwater Bridges =

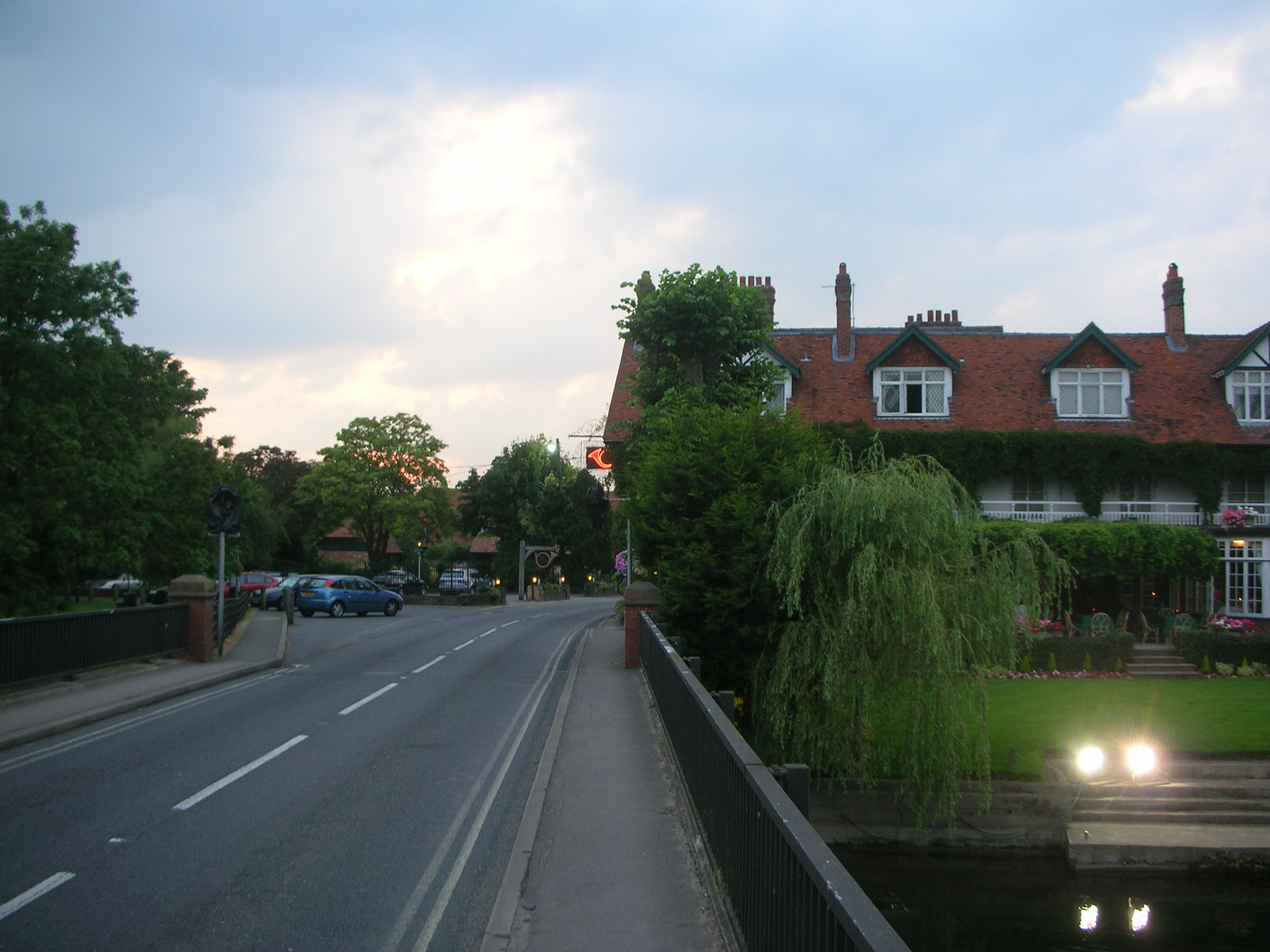
- View along the main Sonning Backwater Bridge towards the French Horn hotel.
- Coordinates: 51°28′36″N 0°54′57″W
- Carries: Minor road (B478)
- Crosses: River Thames
- Locale: Sonning Eye

Characteristics
- Material: Concrete

History
- Opened: 1986

Sonning Backwater Bridges are the road bridges across the first two of three branches of the Thames at Sonning Eye, Oxfordshire, England.

Built in 1986 to replace older wooden structures, one bridge spans a main weir stream – traditionally named the backwater – and the other spans the splayed under-mill outlets from the millrace of the island known as Sonning Eye.

These two bridges are paired with the follow-on, much older, brick arches of Sonning Bridge over the navigation channel which thereby enters Berkshire – specifically Sonning. Together, all these bridges form a near perfectly straight line. All three including their two very short causeways or viaducts between them form the longest structure to cross the river below Wallingford, Oxfordshire and above Windsor Railway Bridge.

== Main channel crossed ==
A few hundred metres upstream along the backwater – a traditional term, as it is today a main weir stream – are the feeding

- side weir and
- leading small sluice

This channel runs along the north-west bank.

This bridge acts as the lead-up or viaduct to the old stone arches of Sonning Bridge which pass over the navigation channel below Sonning Lock. The lock makes use of a much smaller island above, against the Sonning bank and has small side sluices downstream of it through a path isthmus linked to the main mill island.

== Theatre (mill island) ==
On the upstream of the break in the middle of the bridge is the listed building: the Mill at Sonning, since the 1980s a 215-seat, air-conditioned dinner theatre. Its sits on the river's once single island. The island's divide is the underlying mill race which unusually splits into two at its very end so more wheels could be powered by the river. Its rear/side building is the residential mill house, approximately built in 1800, which was at a similar time, discounting the theatre's many alterations. Aside from these two buildings the island is mostly wooded, particularly with willows but also some other mature trees.

== Bankside hotel ==
Built partly in the late 19th century is the French Horn, a large hotel-restaurant north of the bridge, overlooking it.

== History ==
The overall structure replaced a wooden and somewhat rickety one. At the beginning of the 20th century, there were complaints about the traction engines causing it structural problems and disturbing the peace, much as there is with traffic today. The road (the B478) is the busiest B road in Oxfordshire, being the only way for road vehicles to cross the Thames between Henley-on-Thames and Reading.

The bridges are occasionally inundated or closed to traffic when the Thames is in extreme flood; the waters regularly rise to the steps of the French Horn and submerge the car park of The Flowing Spring pub.

== See also ==
- Sonning Bridge
- Crossings of the River Thames
