= Charvil =

Village and civil parish in Berkshire, England

Coordinates: 51.4759°N 0.8855°W

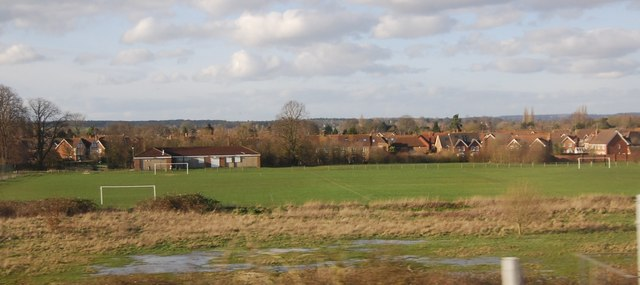
- Recreational area

- Location within Berkshire
- Population: 3,158 (2021 Census)
- OS grid reference: SU775758
- Civil parish: Charvil
- Unitary authority: Wokingham
- Ceremonial county: Berkshire
- Region: South East
- Country: England
- Sovereign state: United Kingdom
- Post town: Reading
- Postcode district: RG10
- Dialling code: 0118
- Police: Thames Valley
- Fire: Royal Berkshire
- Ambulance: South Central
- UK Parliament: Maidenhead
- Website: Charvil Parish Council

Charvil is a village and civil parish in Berkshire, England. The village is 5 miles from Reading on the A4 road to Maidenhead, between Sonning and Twyford. The 2021 Census recorded the parish's population as 3,158. The area was mostly farmland until the 1950s.

== Amenities ==
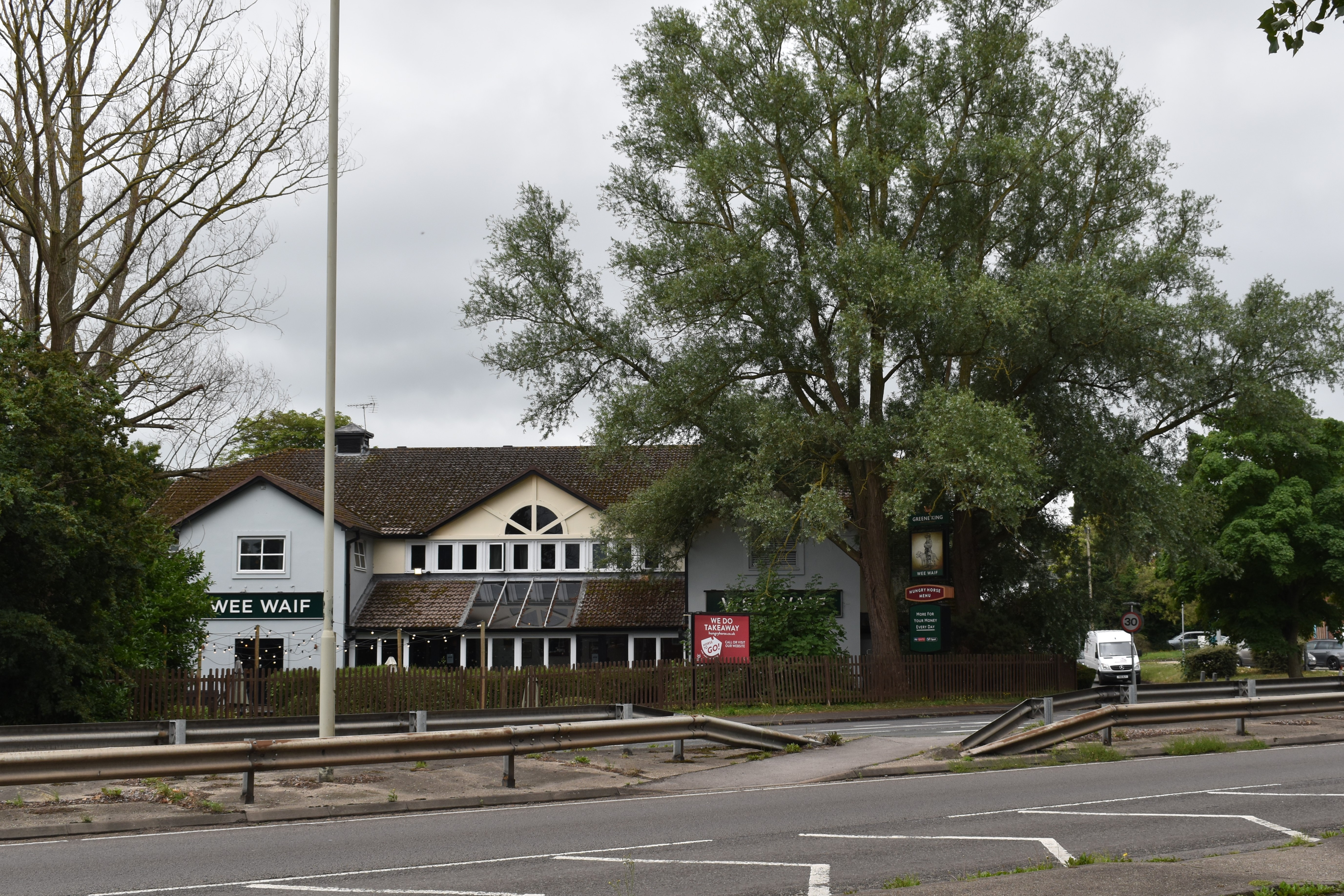
The Wee Waif

Charvil has two pubs: The Wee Waif and The Heron on the Ford (formerly The Lands End). Charvil's original community centre was built in 1952 as the Church of England church of Saint Patrick but was deconsecrated in 2011. It became known as Jubilee Hall. It was later demolished to make room for a housing project in 2019. Charvil is part of the ecclesiastical parish of St Andrew, Sonning.

On 14th May 1988 a new Village Hall was officially opened on The Hawthorns housing development. The hall is owned and managed by Charvil Parish Council, and hosts a number of community and youth groups each week.

In 2016, Charvil Parish Council also took over the management of the Margaret Gimblett Pavilion on the edge of the East Park Farm housing development, along with the neighbouring football and cricket pitches, tennis courts, and a multi-use games area (MUGA).

The land between Charvil and Twyford is a nature reserve with footpaths beside the River Loddon. Charvil also has a country park, woodlands and lakes.

In 2013, Charvil Piggott Primary School opened, providing primary education to children in the village. This school is operated by The Piggott School, the local secondary school in Wargrave. In November 2023 a sinkhole appeared in the East Park Farm Car Park near the Primary School, making national headlines.

== Notable people ==
Notable current and former residents include:

- David Hamilton, radio and television broadcaster
- Alan Titchmarsh, television gardener

== Nearby towns and cities ==
- Henley-on-Thames
- Maidenhead
- Reading
- Woodley

== Nearby villages ==
- Sonning
- Twyford
- Wargrave
- Hurst
