= Laurence Fitton =

Member of the Parliament of England

Laurence Fitton (died 29 March 1434) was the member of the Parliament of England for Marlborough for the parliament of May 1421.

In 1426, he was made bailiff of the episcopal manors of Sonning and Eye for life, for which he received a payment of 10 marks per annum, a robe at Christmas and the means to stable two horses.

He was buried at St Andrew's Church, Sonning.
