= Sun Hill =

Sun Hill or Sunhill may refer to:

- Sunhill, hamlet in the English county of Gloucestershire
- Sun Hill, Georgia, an unincorporated community
- Sun Hill, West Virginia, unincorporated community in Wyoming County, West Virginia, United States
- Sun Hill (The Bill), a fictional location in The Bill, a British TV series

== See also ==
- Sunninghill (disambiguation)
- Sunny Hill (disambiguation)
