= Llewelyn Price-Davies =

British Army general and recipient of the Victoria Cross

Major-General Llewelyn Price-Davies VC CB CMG DSO
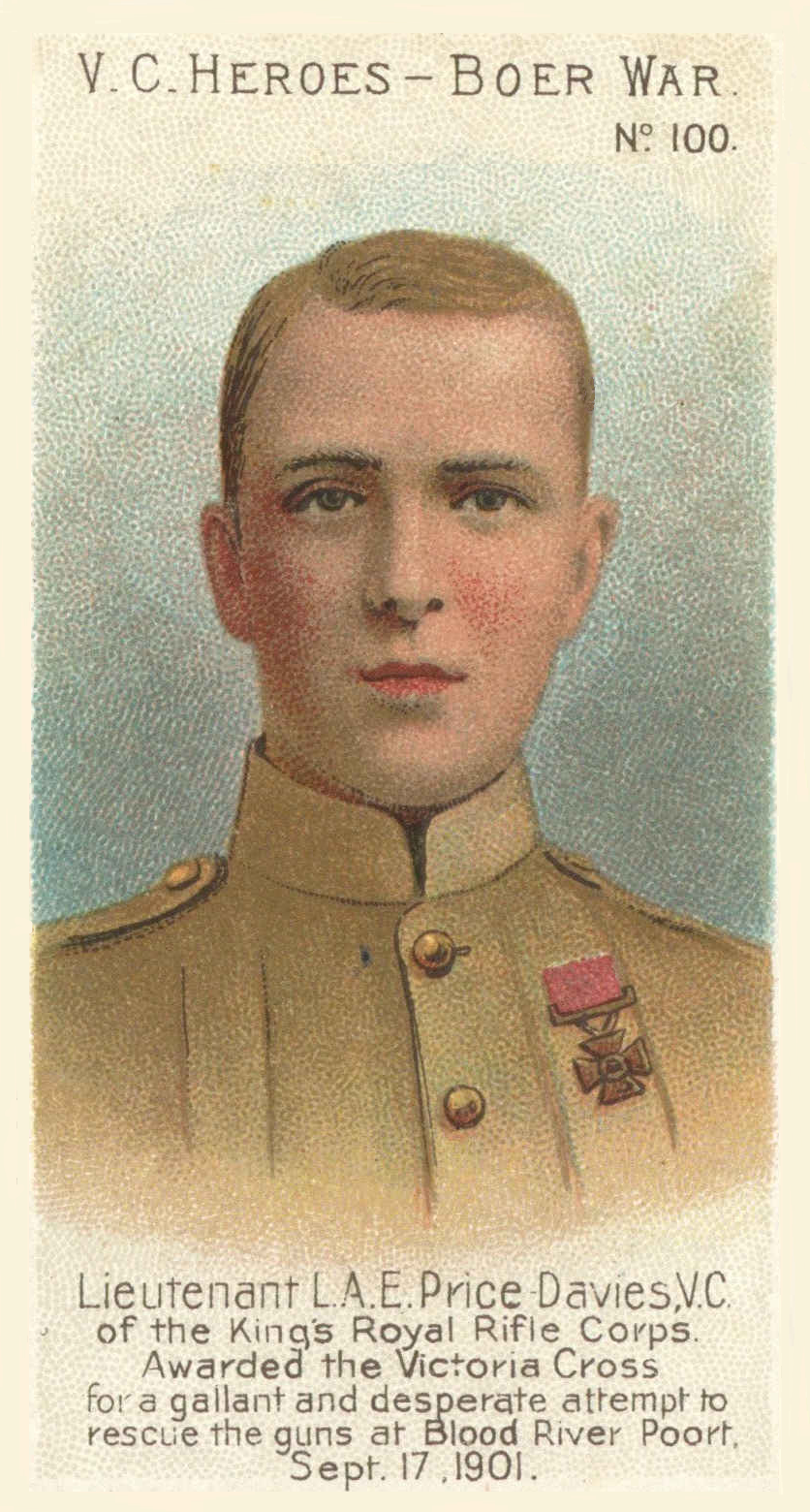
- Price-Davies depicted on a cigarette card
- Born: 30 June 1878; Pimlico, London
- Died: 26 December 1965 (aged 87); Sonning, Berkshire
- Burial place: St Andrew's Churchyard, Sonning
- Military career
- Allegiance: United Kingdom
- Branch: British Army
- Service years: 1898–1930; 1940–1944
- Rank: Major-General
- Units: King's Royal Rifle Corps; Home Guard
- Commands: 113th Brigade; 145th (South Midland) Brigade
- Conflicts: Second Boer War; First World War; Second World War
- Awards: Victoria Cross; Companion of the Order of the Bath; Companion of the Order of St Michael and St George; Distinguished Service Order; Mentioned in Despatches; Officer of the Legion of Honour (France); Commander of the Order of Saints Maurice and Lazarus (Italy)

Major-General Llewelyn Alberic Emilius Price-Davies, VC, CB, CMG, DSO (30 June 1878 – 26 December 1965) was a senior British Army officer and a recipient of the Victoria Cross, the highest award for gallantry in the face of the enemy that can be awarded to British and Commonwealth forces.

== Early life ==
Price-Davies was born at St George's Square, Pimlico, London, on 30 June 1878, third son of landowner Lewis Richard Price of Marrington Hall, Chirbury, Shropshire, and his wife Elizabeth, daughter of J.J. Turner of Pentrehylin, Montgomeryshire. In 1882, the Price family assumed by Royal Licence the added surname Davies, after a Davies family of Welsh descent with an unbroken male line to the 13th-century noble Cynric Efell, Lord of Eglwys Egle. He was educated at Marlborough College and the Royal Military Academy Sandhurst.

== Military career ==
Price-Davies was commissioned a second lieutenant in The King's Royal Rifle Corps on 23 February 1898. He was promoted to lieutenant on 21 October 1899, and seconded for service in South Africa during the Second Boer War, where he was awarded the Distinguished Service Order in April 1901.

Price-Davies was 23 years old, and a lieutenant in The King's Royal Rifle Corps during the Second Boer War when the following deed took place at Blood River Poort for which he was awarded the Victoria Cross:

At Blood River Poort, on the 17th September, 1901, when the Boers had overwhelmed the right of the British Column, and some 400 of them were galloping round the flank and rear of the guns, riding up to the drivers (who were trying to get the guns away) and calling upon them to surrender, Lieutenant Price Davies, hearing an order to fire upon the charging Boers, at once drew his revolver and dashed in among them, firing at them in a most gallant and desperate attempt to rescue the guns. He was immediately shot and knocked off his horse, but was not mortally wounded, although he had ridden to what seemed to be almost certain death without a moment's hesitation.

Price-Davies was promoted to captain in his regiment on 7 January 1902, while still seconded with Mounted Infantry in South Africa. He stayed there until after the end of the war, leaving Cape Town on the SS Orient in October 1902.

In September 1906 he became adjutant to a unit of mounted infantry in South Africa.

In November 1910 he succeeded Brevet Major Herbert Shoubridge as brigade major of the 13th Infantry Brigade. In June 1912 Price-Davies was posted to the War Office as a GSO3.

During the First World War Price-Davies served on the Western Front and Italy, and after serving as a GSO2 in October 1914, becoming a brevet lieutenant colonel in January 1916 and a temporary brigadier general, to which he had been promoted in November 1915 when he was assigned to command the 113th Infantry Brigade. He was appointed a Companion of the Order of St Michael and St George in January 1918 was made a brevet colonel in June 1918, and a Companion of the Order of the Bath in January 1921. He was also made an Officer of the French Legion of Honour and Commander of the Italian Order of Saints Maurice and Lazarus.

Price-Davies was president of the army's Standing Committee of Enquiry regarding Prisoners of War 1918-1919, aide-de-campe to King George V 1920-1930, assistant-adjutant-general, Aldershot Command 1920-1924, commander 145th Infantry Brigade 1924-1927, and finally assistant-adjutant and quartermaster-general of the army in Gibraltar.

He retired with the honorary rank of major general in 1930. In retirement he joined the Honourable Corps of Gentlemen at Arms, serving until 1948, and served in World War II as Battalion Commander in the Home Guard from 1940 to 1945. He was also a member of the National Council of the Y.M.C.A. from 1930.

== Personal life and death ==
Price-Davies married, on 18 August 1906, Eileen Geraldine Edith, daughter of James Wilson, of Currygrane, Edgeworthstown, Ireland.

Price-Davies died in retirement at his home, Corndon, in Sonning, Berkshire in December 1965 aged 87. His grave and memorial are at St Andrew's churchyard in Sonning. His Victoria Cross is displayed at the Royal Green Jackets (Rifles) Museum in Winchester, England.

== Bibliography ==
- Robinson, Peter (2013). The Letters of Major General Price-Davies VC, CB, CMG, DSO: From Captain to Major General, 1914-18. Spellmount. ISBN 978-0752487366.
