= Basser Library =

Coordinates: 35.2837°S 149.1227°E

The Basser Library is the library of the Australian Academy of Science, established in 1960 following the donation of £25,000 ($50,000), by philanthropist Sir Adolph Basser (1887–1965). The Library collects published and unpublished material documenting the history of science in Australia, with a particular emphasis on collecting biographical material about prominent scientists, and promotes related historical research.

The library is open to the public by appointment.

== Collections ==
=== Manuscript collection ===
The manuscript collection contains 219 sets of papers, ranging from singular letters through to extensive papers covering many shelf meters. Prominent individual scientists represented in the collection include Sir David Rivett, Sir Ian Wark and Dr Lloyd Rees, academics such as Professor Frank Fenner, Sir Neil Hamilton Fairley and Sir Ernest Titterton and more than 60 other Fellows of the Academy. A number of scientific societies records are also held, including the Australian Institute of Physics and the Geological Society of Australia.

=== Books and journals ===
The collection holds some notable holdings including back sets of Australian scientific periodicals produced by the early colonial Royal Societies and the other voluntary scientific associations that flourished in Australia in the 19th century, such as the Linnean Society of New South Wales.

== Moran Award for History of Science Research ==
Each year the Library offers an award of $2,500 to encourage use of the collections by postgraduate students and other independent researchers.
