= Neil Hamilton Fairley =

Australian physician and soldier (1891-1966)

Sir Neil Hamilton Fairley KBE, CStJ, FRACP, FRCP, FRCPE, FRS
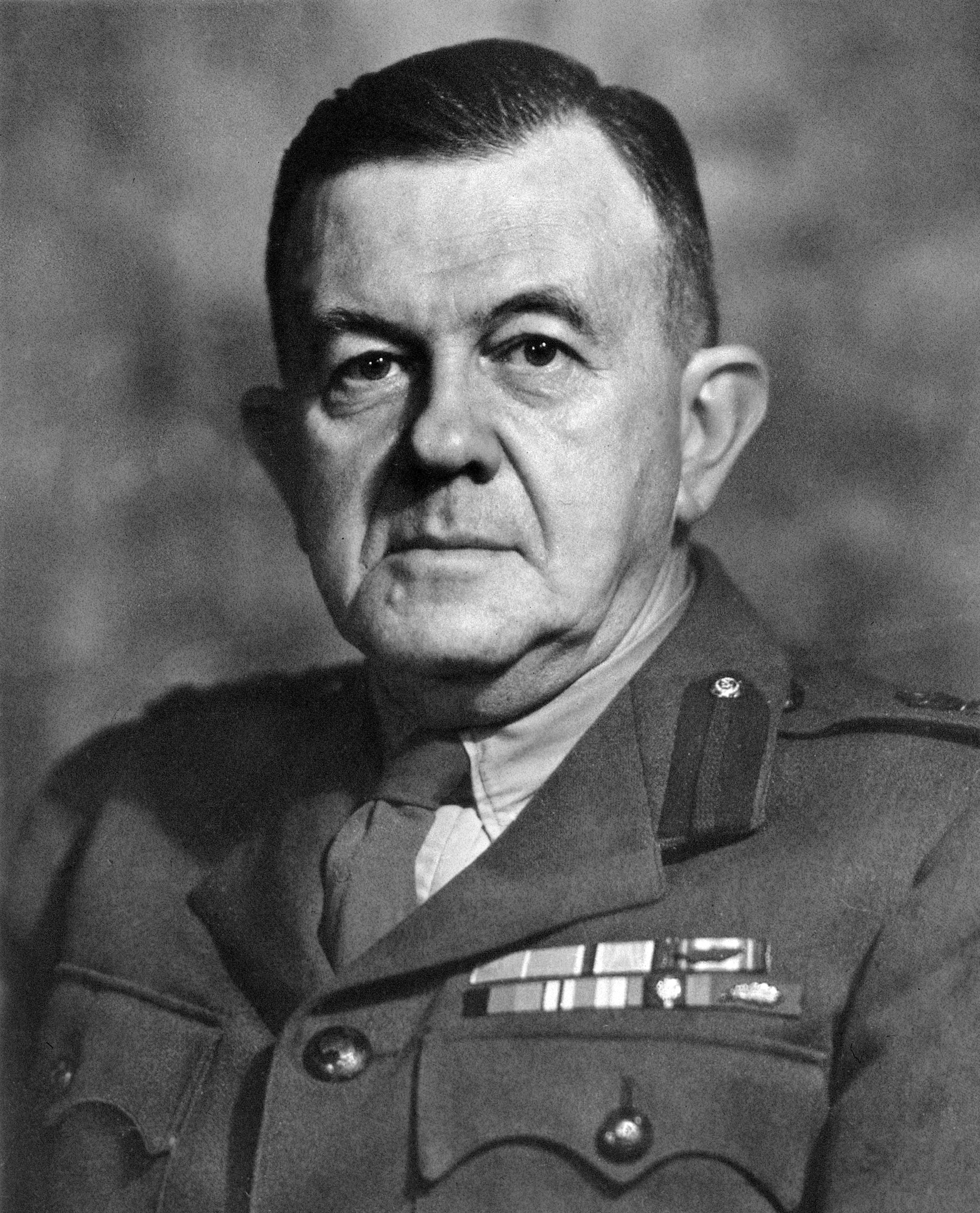
- Born: 15 July 1891; Inglewood, Victoria, Australia
- Died: 19 April 1966 (aged 74); Sonning, Berkshire, England
- Relatives: Gordon Hamilton-Fairley (son)
- Military career
- Allegiance: Australia
- Branch: Australian Army
- Service years: 1915–1946
- Rank: Brigadier
- Service number: VX38970
- Commands: Director of Medicine at Allied Land Forces Headquarters; 14th General Hospital
- Conflicts: First World War; Sinai and Palestine Campaign; Second World War; Battle of Greece; Syria-Lebanon campaign; Netherlands East Indies campaign; Kokoda Track campaign; Salamaua-Lae campaign; Finisterre Range campaign; Aitape-Wewak campaign
- Awards: Knight Commander of the Order of the British Empire; Commander of the Order of St John; Mentioned in Despatches (2); Fellow of the Royal Society; Cameron Prize for Therapeutics of the University of Edinburgh (1947); Manson Medal (1950)

Sir Neil Hamilton Fairley (15 July 1891 – 19 April 1966) was an Australian physician, medical scientist, and army officer who was instrumental in saving thousands of Allied lives from malaria and other diseases.

A graduate of the University of Melbourne, where he was resident of Ormond College, Fairley joined the Australian Army Medical Corps in 1915. He investigated an epidemic of meningitis that was occurring in Army camps in Australia. While with the 14th General Hospital in Cairo, he investigated schistosomiasis (then known as bilharzia) and developed tests and treatments for the disease. In the inter-war period he became renowned as an expert on tropical medicine.

Fairley returned to the Australian Army during the Second World War as Director of Medicine. He played an important role in the planning for the Battle of Greece, convincing the British Commander-in-Chief, General Sir Archibald Wavell to alter his campaign plan to reduce the danger from malaria. In the South West Pacific Area, Fairley became responsible for co-ordinating the activities of all allied forces in the fight against malaria and other tropical diseases. Fairley again sounded the alarm on the dangers of malaria, persuading authorities in the United States and United Kingdom to greatly step up production of anti-malarial drugs. Through the activities of the LHQ Medical Research Unit, he fast-tracked research into new drugs. Fairley convinced the Army of the efficacy of the new drug atebrin, and persuaded commanders to adopt a tough approach to administering the drug to the troops.

After the war Fairley returned to London where he became a consulting physician to the Hospital for Tropical Diseases and Wellcome Professor of Tropical Medicine at the London School of Hygiene and Tropical Medicine. A serious illness in 1948 forced him to resign his professorship, but he retained his practice and membership of numerous committees, becoming an "elder statesman" of tropical medicine.

== Early life ==
Neil Hamilton Fairley was born in Inglewood, Victoria, on 15 July 1891, as the third of six sons of James Fairley, a bank manager, and his wife Margaret Louisa, née Jones. All four of their sons who survived to adulthood took up medicine as a career. One qualified as a Doctor of Medicine at the University of Melbourne and a Fellow of the Royal College of Surgeons in England and became a surgeon; he was killed in action in the First World War. A second also qualified as a Doctor of Medicine at the University of Melbourne, and later as a Fellow of the Royal Australasian College of Physicians and Fellow of the Royal College of Physicians; he became senior physician at Royal Melbourne Hospital. A third son became a general practitioner.

Neil was educated at Scotch College, Melbourne, where he was dux of his class. He attended the University of Melbourne, graduating with his Bachelor of Medicine and Surgery with first class honours in 1915, and his Doctor of Medicine in 1917. While there, he won the Australian inter-varsity high jumping championship and represented Victoria in tennis.

== First World War ==
Fairley joined the Australian Army Medical Corps with the rank of captain on 1 August 1915 and was posted to Royal Melbourne Hospital as a resident medical officer. He investigated an epidemic of meningitis that was occurring in local Army camps, and his first published paper was an analysis of this disease, documenting fifty cases. In 1916, he co-authored a monograph published by the federal government detailing 644 cases, of which 338 (52%) were fatal (before the invention of antibiotic drugs).

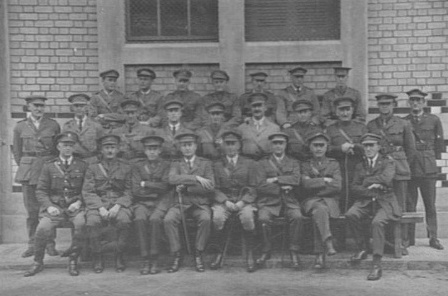
Cairo, 1917. Group portrait of officers of 14 General Hospital. Major N. H. Fairley is second from the right.

Fairley enlisted in the First Australian Imperial Force (AIF) on 24 August 1916. On 5 September 1916, he embarked for Egypt on RMS Kashgar, joining the 14th General Hospital in Cairo. There he encountered Major Charles Martin, formerly Professor of Physiology at the University of Melbourne and Director of the Lister Institute from 1903 to 1930. At this time, Martin was working as a Consulting Physician to the AIF in Egypt and commanded the Anzac Field Laboratory.

While in Egypt, Fairley investigated schistosomiasis (then known as bilharzia). The disease was known to be caused by contact with fresh water inhabited by certain species of snails, and orders had been issued that prohibited bathing in fresh water, but the troops were slow to appreciate the danger involved. In its toxic phase, the disease was easily confused with typhus, so Fairley developed a complement fixation test for the disease along the lines of the Wassermann test. He studied its pathology, confirming that the worms in the circulatory system could be cured by intravenous tartaric acid. Fairley also studied, and later published papers on typhus, malaria, and bacillary dysentery.

Fairley married Staff Nurse Violet May Phillips at the Garrison Church, Abbassia, Cairo on 12 February 1919. They divorced on 21 November 1924. He was promoted to lieutenant colonel on 15 March 1919 and commanded the 14th General Hospital for a time before embarking for the United Kingdom in June 1919. For his services in the First World War, Fairley was mentioned in despatches and made an Officer of the Military Division of the Order of the British Empire. His citation read:

Brilliant work in Pathology—the result of eighteen months of patient and skilful work in the laboratory of the 14th Australian General Hospital. His work on Bilharzia will be of untold value to the civilian population of Egypt.

== Between the wars ==
Fairley was one of a number of AIF officers granted leave "to visit various hospitals in the United Kingdom so that they become conversant with the latest developments in the medical sciences". For a time, he worked for Martin at the Lister Institute in London where he qualified for membership of the Royal College of Physicians of London. He also received a Diploma of Public Health from the University of Cambridge. He returned to Australia on the transport Orontes in February 1920, to become a research assistant to Sydney Patterson, director of the Walter and Eliza Hall Institute of Medical Research, where Fairley worked on developing a test for echinococcosis along the lines of the test that he had already developed for bilharzia.

Fairley remained for less than a year before resigning to take up a five-year appointment in Bombay as Chair of Clinical Tropical Medicine at a newly created School of Tropical Medicine, a post for which he had been nominated by the Royal Society. On arrival in India, he found that the scheme had been abandoned and that as his appointment could be terminated at six-months' notice, he would no longer be required after October 1922. Fairley demanded and received an audience with the Governor of Bombay, Sir George Lloyd, the result of which was that the Secretary of State agreed to create a special five-year post of Medical Officer of the Bombay Bacteriological Laboratory and Honorary Consulting Physician to the Sir Jamshedjee Jeejebhoy Hospital and St George Hospital.

In India, Fairley continued his research into schistosomiasis. The disease was unknown in India but snails were abundant and there was danger that troops returning from Egypt might introduce it. In the absence of human schistosoma, Fairley investigated bovine schistosoma, which infected water buffalo and other domesticated animals in the Bombay area. Experiments with monkeys proved that daily intravenous doses of tartaric acid were an effective treatment. Fairley also carried out pioneering work on Guinea worm disease (dracunculiasis). His main interest was tropical sprue, but he was unable to determine its cause or discover a cure. He contracted the disease himself and made some advances in its treatment. He was invalided out of India, and travelled to the United Kingdom to recuperate in 1925. While in India he had met Mary Evelyn Greaves, and they were married at the Presbyterian Church, Marylebone, on 28 October 1925.

Fairley returned to Australia in 1927 and rejoined the Walter and Eliza Hall Institute. He worked there for two years, collaborating with the new director, Charles Kellaway in studies of snake venoms and with Harold Dew on the development of diagnostic tests for echinococcosis. Fairley dedicated most of 1928 to the snake venom programme, co-ordinating an enormous body of epidemiological data—including a questionnaire to Australian clinicians—on the frequency and outcome of bites by Australian elapid snakes. This work involved numerous milkings to establish typical and maximal venom yields, innovative studies of snake dentition using wax moulds, and detailed dissections to describe each species' biting apparatus. Fairley furthermore undertook in vivo studies of envenomation in a range of large animal species, to determine the efficacy of prevailing first-aid measures. He concluded that at best, ligature and local venesection might slow time to death after a significant envenomation. This reinforced the need for effective antivenenes (antivenoms) for the more dangerous local species of snakes, notably the tiger snake (Notechis scutatus), death adder (Acanthophis antarcticus) and copperhead (Austrelaps superbus), although only the former was suitable for manufacture by the Commonwealth Serum Laboratories (now CSL Limited).

In 1928, Fairley received an appointment in London as Assistant Physician to the Hospital for Tropical Diseases and Lecturer at the London School of Hygiene and Tropical Medicine. Although he and Kellaway convinced the governors to delay Fairley's commencement until their major venom work was completed, he departed for London by the end of that year. He also opened a consulting practice in Harley Street. In London he encountered patients with filariasis and devised a test to diagnose the disease at an early stage; but when he went to write up his results he discovered that details of a similar test had already been published. In 1934, a sewer worker was referred to his ward with acute jaundice which Fairley diagnosed as caused by filariasis. The disease was revealed to be an occupational hazard of sewer workers, and steps were taken to protect the workers. Perhaps his most important work in this period was research into blackwater fever. Since malaria cases were uncommon in the United Kingdom, he made annual visits to the Malaria Research Laboratory of the League of Nations at the Refugee Hospital in Salonika. In the process, he described methaemalbumin, a previously unknown blood pigment. For his scientific accomplishments in London, Fairley was elected a Fellow of the Royal Society in 1942.

== Second World War ==
=== Middle East ===
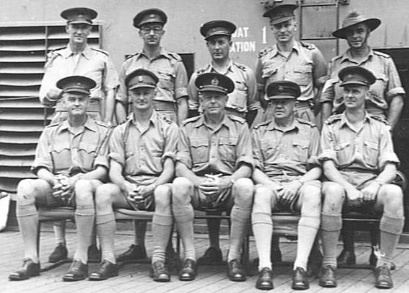
Group portrait of officers of Headquarters I Corps gathered on the deck of the troop transport Orcades. Colonel N. H. Fairley is in the front row, second from the right.

With the outbreak of the Second World War, the Australian Army's director general of medical services, Major General Rupert Downes tapped Fairley as consulting physician. Fairley was seconded to the Second Australian Imperial Force (AIF) with the rank of colonel on 15 July 1940 and given the serial number VX38970. He joined the AIF Headquarters in Cairo in September, taking advantage of the initial quiet period to familiarise himself with the AIF's medical units and their commanders. As the British Army in the Middle East had no consulting physician in tropical diseases, Fairley accepted an offer to act in this capacity as well.

In January 1941 the British Army began planning for operations in Greece. Fairley and his British colleague, Colonel John Boyd, a consulting pathologist, drafted a medical appreciation. Drawing on the experience of the Salonika front in the First World War, where very heavy casualties suffered from malaria, plus Fairley's more recent experience in that part of the world, they painted a gloomy picture, emphasising the grave risks, and going so far as to suggest that the Germans might attempt to entice the allies into a summer campaign in which they could be destroyed by malaria. The British Commander-in-Chief, General Sir Archibald Wavell decried their report as "typical of a very non-medical and non-military spirit", but a face-to-face meeting with Boyd and Fairley convinced Wavell that they were serious and not merely uncooperative, and Wavell promised his assistance in mitigating the danger. The campaign plan was altered to position allied forces further south, away from the plains of Macedonia and the Vardar and Struma River basins, where malaria was hyper-endemic and heavy casualties had been suffered from malaria by British troops during the First World War.

Fairley tackled an outbreak of bacilliary dysentery among the troops in Egypt. In most cases the patients recovered of their own accord but some cases of shigellosis became seriously ill and died. Fairley had some Shiga anti-toxin with him, but it proved ineffective in serious cases, even when administered in large doses. However, he also had an experimental supply of sulphaguanidine that had been given to him by Dr E. K. Marshall of Johns Hopkins Hospital. The drug was administered to a patient with severe shigellosis who was not expected to live, and the patient soon recovered. Of the 21,015 Australian soldiers who contracted bacilliary dysentery during the Second World War, only 21 died.

Malaria again became a concern in the Syria-Lebanon Campaign. The Australian Army raised malaria control units for the first time and as soon as the operational situation permitted swamps and areas of open water were drained and mosquito breeding areas were sprayed. There were 2,435 cases of malaria in the AIF in 1941, a rate of 31.8 per thousand per year. Quinine was used as a prophylaxis. On Fairley's advice, patients with relapses were treated with intravenous quinine for three days followed by a course of atebrin and plasmoquine. For his services in the Middle East, Fairley was mentioned in despatches a second time, and made a Commander of the Military Division Order of the British Empire for his "immense and specialised knowledge of tropical diseases in the Middle East".

=== South West Pacific ===
With the entry of Japan into the war, Fairley flew to Java in January 1942. Fairley was well aware that Java produced 90% of the world's supply of quinine and that the implications would be serious if Java was lost. He arranged for the purchase of all available stocks of quinine, some 120 long tons (120 t). Fairley was informed that the quinine had been loaded on board two ships. One was never seen again. The other, the SS Klang, reached Fremantle in March. Although 20 long tons (20 t) of quinine was loaded on board, it was apparently unloaded when the ship stopped at Tjilatjap, possibly due to fifth columnists. Thus, none of the shipment reached Australia. Fairley himself departed Java with the I Corps staff on the transport Orcades on 21 February 1942 shortly before Java fell.

In General Sir Thomas Blamey's reorganisation of the Australian Army in April 1942, Fairley was appointed director of medicine at Allied Land Forces Headquarters (LHQ) in Melbourne. Fairley was soon facing a series of medical emergencies caused by the Kokoda Track campaign. An epidemic of bacillary dysentery was headed off by Fairley's decision to rush all available supplies of sulphaguanadine to New Guinea. On Fairley's advice every man who complained of diarrhoea was given the drug and the epidemic was brought under control in ten days.

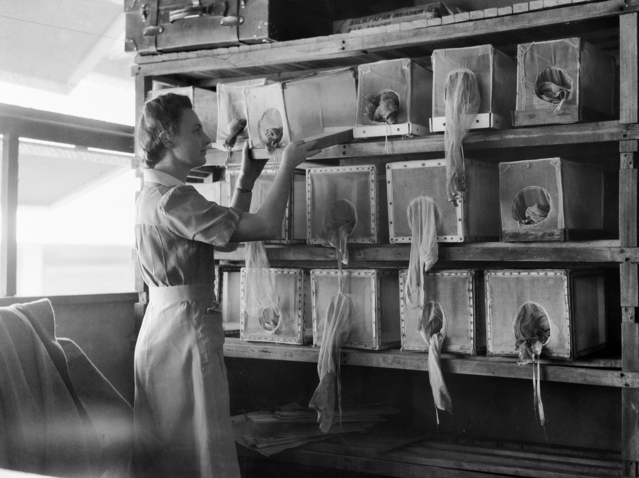
Malaria research at the Medical Research Unit in Cairns

But Fairley's main concern was malaria. Despite the experience with malaria in the Middle East, most of the troops had a poor understanding of anti-malaria precautions and few medical officers had encountered the disease. In combination with critical shortages of drugs and anti-malarial supplies such as netting, insecticides and repellents, the result was a medical disaster. In the 13-week period from 31 October 1942 to 1 January 1943, the Army reported 4,137 battle casualties, but 14,011 casualties from tropical diseases, of which 12,240 were from malaria. The government grimly contemplated disbanding divisions to replace malaria casualties. "Our worst enemy in New Guinea," General Blamey declared, "is not the Nip—it’s the bite."

This caused Blamey to despatch a medical mission headed by Fairley to the United States and the United Kingdom in September 1942 to present the Army's case for a more adequate and equitable share of anti-malarial supplies. The mission was successful. Fairley was able to secure supplies and expedite the delivery of those that were already on order but held up for lack of shipping or priority. In bringing the problem to the attention of the highest allied military and civil authorities overseas, he lifted the global profile and priority of malaria control measures.

It was calculated that Allied requirements for atebrin would be 200 long tons (200 t) per annum, of which 50 long tons (51 t) would be manufactured in the United Kingdom and 150 long tons (150 t) in the United States. American production in 1942 was estimated at 60 tons but efforts were soon under way to increase production. The possibility of producing atebrin in Australia was considered, but the drug was complicated to synthesise and required little shipping space, although steps were taken to produce mosquito repellent. As in the Middle East, the Army relied on a combination of quinine, atebrin and plasmoquine (QAP) to cure malaria. The United States and United Kingdom agreed to each produce two tons of plasmoquine each per annum. The requested drugs and supplies began arriving in December 1942.

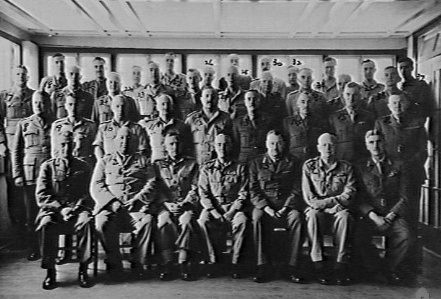
Atherton Conference. Brigadier N. H. Fairley is at the right of the second row.

As "one of the reasons for the lamentable record in malaria control in 1942 and early 1943 was the absence of medical authority at the level of the theatre commander's headquarters", Fairley suggested that there be a body responsible for co-ordinating the activities of all allied forces in the South West Pacific Area. General Blamey took the matter up with the General Douglas MacArthur, the Supreme Commander. MacArthur, who had himself suffered an attack of malaria back in 1904 (and a serious relapse the next year), created the Combined Advisory Committee on Tropical Medicine, Hygiene and Sanitation with Colonel Fairley as its chairman in March 1943. After its first meeting, Fairley met with MacArthur, who emphasised that he did not wish the committee to concern itself with matters of academic interest but to make concrete recommendations on essential medical matters. The committee proceeded to make a series of recommendations regarding training, discipline, equipment, procedures and priorities, which then went out as GHQ orders to all commands.

Fairley's proposed use of atebrin as a prophylactic agent was accepted and Fairley switched the Australian Army over to using atebrin as a prophylaxis instead of quinine in March 1943. The most acute problem at this time was a shortage of atebrin. The Australian Army had only seven weeks' stock was on hand in March 1943 and US forces in both the South West Pacific and South Pacific Area were drawing on Australian Army stocks as they had not yet received adequate stocks of their own. The drug is also a dye, and had the known side effect of making the skin and eyeballs of the user go yellow in colour after repeated use but this was an acceptable drawback in wartime. Prolonged use could cause lichen planus and psychosis in rare cases, but atebrin still turned out to be much safer than quinine. Blackwater fever—which had a mortality rate of 25%—disappeared entirely.

Fairley was acutely aware that much remained unknown about malaria. In particular, he was interested in the possibility that sulphaguanidine (or a related sulphonamide) might be a causal prophylactic against malaria, as they could be manufactured in Australia, unlike atebrin and plasmoquine. Fairley decided to establish a unit in Cairns to investigate malaria. The LHQ Medical Research Unit commenced work in June 1943.

Fairley travelled to New Guinea at the end of June 1943 and arranged for Plasmodium falciparum cases to be evacuated to Cairns for treatment. As the flight time from Port Moresby to Cairns was only a few hours, this was considered safe, but since the disease can be fatal if not treated promptly, Fairley was concerned lest the cases be delayed for some reason. Movement Control suggested that a special priority be allocated to such cases, and Major General Frank Berryman suggested calling it priority Neil after Fairley himself. Because movement priorities had to have five letters, an extra L was added on the end. Priority Neill soon came to be applied to the entire Cairns project.

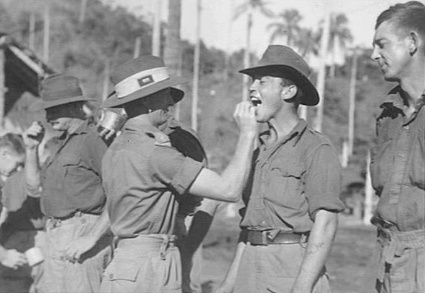
Atebrin parade in New Guinea

The LHQ Medical Research Unit used human test subjects, all volunteers drawn from the Australian Army, including a small but notable group of 'Dunera Boys' (Jewish refugees) from the 8th Employment Company. The volunteers were infected with strains of malaria from infected mosquitoes, or from the blood of other test subjects, which was then treated with various drugs. The volunteers were rewarded with three weeks' leave and a certificate of appreciation signed by General Blamey. The LHQ Medical Research Unit researched quinine, sulphonamides, atebrin, plasmoquine, and paludrine.

In June 1944, a conference was held at Atherton, Queensland on "Prevention of Disease in Warfare". Chaired by Lieutenant General Vernon Sturdee, the commander of the First Army, it was attended by key corps and division commanders. Fairley, who had been promoted to brigadier in February 1944, described the results of the work at Cairns on anti-malarial drugs; other officers described practical measures that could be taken to reduce the toll of disease on the men. The Director General of Medical Services, Major General S. R. (Ginger) Burston, told the senior commanders "the ball is in your court".

Using draconian drills that required officers to place atebrin tablets in their men's mouths, the army attempted to reduce the incidence of malaria to zero. For the most part they were successful but in the Aitape-Wewak campaign the 6th Division suffered an epidemic of malaria despite its best efforts. Fairley was urgently recalled from a tour of South East Asia Command and given orders by General Blamey to personally proceed to Wewak and investigate the situation. A special section was formed from the LHQ Medical Research Unit to assist the 6th Division and certain relapsing personnel were evacuated to Cairns. The epidemic was ultimately brought under control by doubling the dosage of atebrin. Fairley was forced to confront the fact—confirmed by research at Cairns—that an atebrin-resistant strain of malaria had arisen. The ability of malaria to develop resistant strains would have profound implications in the post-war world.

== Later life ==
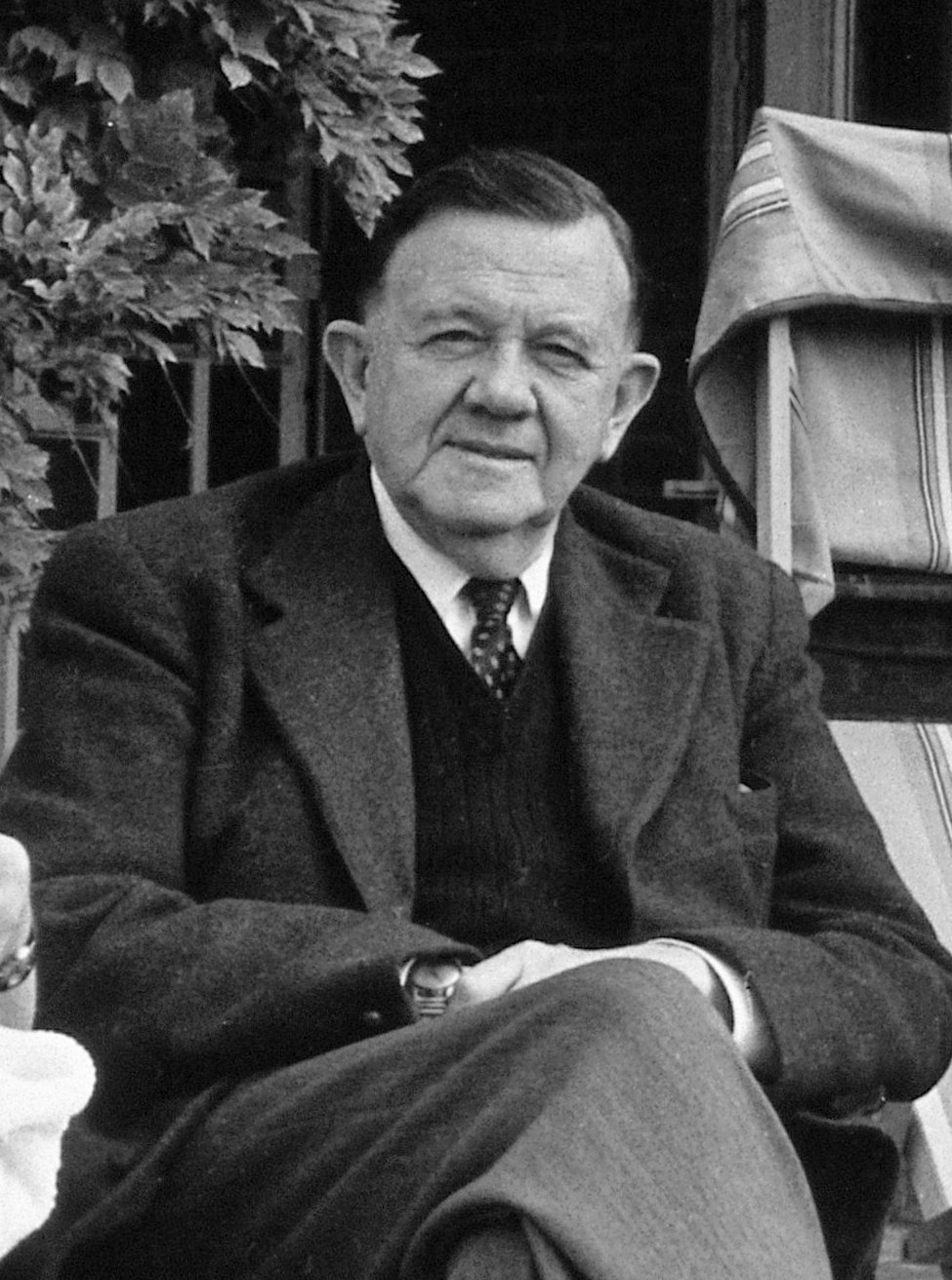
Neil Hamilton Fairley in 1956

After the war Australian medical research was substantially reorganised, but Fairley joined the ranks of senior Australian medical scientists who spent the remainder of their professional lives in Britain. In London he became consulting physician to the Hospital for Tropical Diseases and Wellcome Professor of Tropical Medicine at the London School of Hygiene and Tropical Medicine. His early post war research was a continuation of his wartime work on malaria. He became seriously ill in 1948 and his health steadily declined thereafter, forcing him to resign his professorship. He retained his practice and membership of numerous committees, becoming an "elder statesman" of tropical medicine. In recognition of his service to tropical medicine, he was created a Knight Commander of the Order of the British Empire on 8 June 1950.

Fairley's declining health prompted him to leave London and move to The Grove, Sonning, Berkshire, where he died on 19 April 1966, and was buried in the graveyard of St Andrew's Church, Sonning. He was survived by his wife and their two sons, who were both medical doctors, and also by the son of his first marriage, who had become an Australian Army officer. His son Gordon Hamilton-Fairley, a renowned oncologist, was killed by a Provisional Irish Republican Army bomb on 22 October 1975.

Sir William Dargie painted a portrait of Fairley in 1943, which is in the possession the Fairley family. A later 1960 portrait by Dargie, together with a 1945 one by Nora Heysen, is in the Australian War Memorial. Neither is on display, although the latter can be viewed online. A 1954 Dargie portrait of Queen Elizabeth II painted while Dargie was staying at Fairley's home at 81 Duke Street, Grosvenor Square, in London, and subsequently given to Fairley, was sold at auction to the National Museum of Australia in 2009 for $120,000. Fairley's papers were in the Basser Library at the Australian Academy of Science from 1975 until 2019. In November 2019 they were transferred to the Australian War Memorial. He is commemorated by the Neil Hamilton Fairley Overseas Clinical Fellowship, which provides full-time training in Australia and overseas in areas of clinical research including the social and behavioural sciences.

== Medical awards and prizes ==
- 1920 Dublin Research Prize
- 1921 David Syme Research Prize and Medal
- 1931 Chalmers Medal for Research in Tropical Medicine
- 1945 Bancroft Memorial Medal
- 1946 Richard Pierson Strong Medal, American Foundation of Tropical Medicine
- 1947 Cameron Prize for Therapeutics of the University of Edinburgh
- 1948 Moxon Medal, Royal College of Physicians
- 1949 Mary Kingsley Medal, Liverpool School of Tropical Medicine
- 1950 Manson Medal, Royal Society of Tropical Medicine and Hygiene
- 1951 James Cook Medal, Royal Society of NSW
- 1957 Buchanan Medal, Royal Society of London

Source: Boyd 1966, p. 141
