= Sonning Bridge =

Bridge in Sonning, Bergshire, England

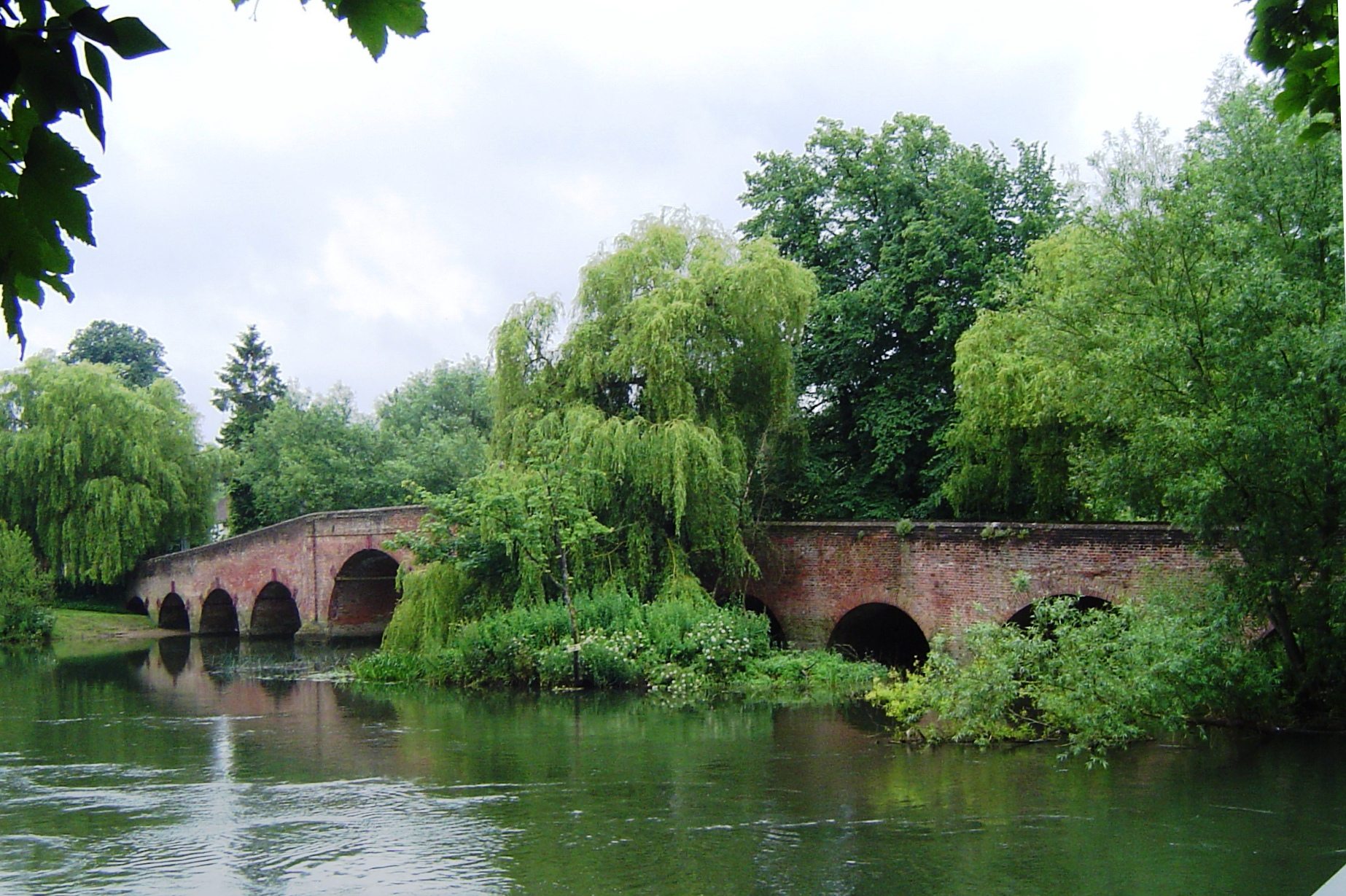
- Sonning Bridge on the downstream side, from the Thames Path footbridge
- Coordinates: 51°28′33″N 0°54′50″W
- Carries: Thames Path, Minor road
- Crosses: River Thames
- Locale: Sonning
- Heritage status: Grade II listed

Characteristics
- Design: Arch
- Material: Brick
- Height: 14 feet 2 inches (4.32 m)

History
- Opened: 1775

Location
- Interactive map of Sonning Bridge

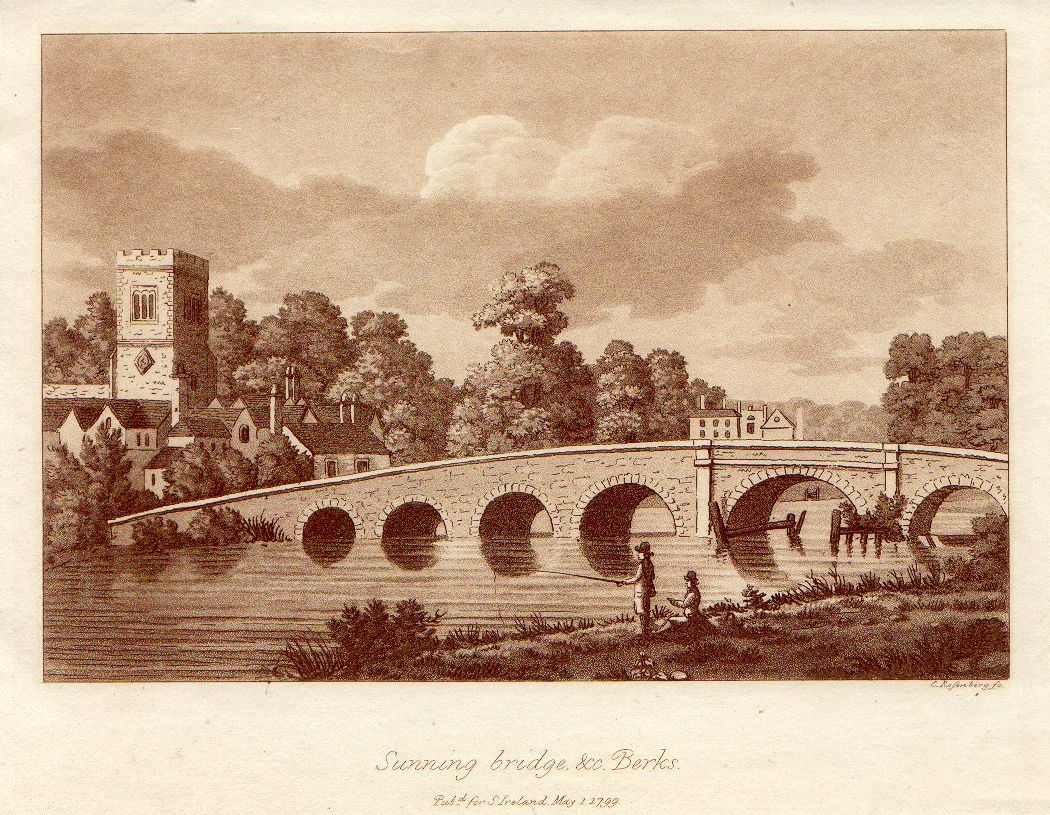
Print of Sonning Bridge, 1799

Sonning Bridge is a road bridge across the River Thames at Sonning, Berkshire. It links Sonning with Sonning Eye (Oxfordshire) and crosses the Thames on the reach above Shiplake Lock, just short of Sonning Lock. It is a brick arch bridge completed in 1775, to replace an earlier wooden bridge. The bridge has been the subject of many paintings and prints by artists and is a Grade II listed structure.

The road extends to the two Sonning Backwater Bridges. One is over the backwater downstream of the weir and the other is over the millrace which is between the two main branches.

The Thames Path crosses the river at this point.

== History ==
The earliest definite reference to a "timber" bridge is around 1530, although there are claims that there was a wooden old Saxon bridge here before 1125. It was spoken of as being rebuilt in 1604, although throughout the 17th century there are reports of decay and the need for repair.

A stone marker at the centre of the bridge is marked "B | O'" (for the counties of Berkshire and Oxfordshire on each side of the river) with the vertical line indicating the exact boundary down the middle of the river. This is an ancient border which used to be between Wessex and Mercia.

In the 18th century, the bridge possibly gave Dick Turpin a convenient escape route from Berkshire to Oxfordshire when he was staying at his aunt's inn in Sonning.

At the beginning of the 20th century, there were complaints about traction engines causing structural problems with the old wooden backwater bridges at Sonning and disturbing the peace. The wooden backwater bridges were not replaced until the 20th century.

The bridge became a Grade II listed building on 1 August 1952.

== Traffic ==
Sonning Bridge has traffic lights because it is too narrow for traffic in both directions simultaneously. It is the only road bridge across the Thames between Henley-on-Thames and Reading. Thus there are large queues during the morning and evening rush hours. An additional bridge to relieve the traffic problems has been a subject of debate for many years. In 2019, Transport for South East proposed a bridge at Playhatch, but while supported by local councils in Berkshire, the bid for funds from the Department for Transport was opposed by Oxfordshire.

== Art installations ==
Beginning in the second decade of the 21st century, the anonymous artist Impro has affixed a series of objects to a supporting buttress of the bridge: the frontage of a letterbox (2013), a front door with floating doormat (2016), a telephone labelled "Emergency Flood Line" (2021), another postbox (2022), a urinal (2023). and a cashpoint (2024).

== Adjacent buildings ==
Close to the bridge are the Great House, a hotel on the southern bank, the Mill at Sonning, now a theatre, on an island between two branches of the river, and the French Horn, another hotel on the northern bank.

== See also ==
- Crossings of the River Thames

Next bridge upstream	River Thames	Next bridge downstream
Caversham Lock (pedestrian)	Sonning Bridge; Grid reference SU755757	Shiplake Railway Bridge (rail)
Next bridge upstream	Thames Path	Next bridge downstream
southern bank Whitchurch Bridge	Sonning Bridge & Sonning Backwater Bridges	northern bank Henley Bridge
