= Hugh Pearson (canon of Windsor) =

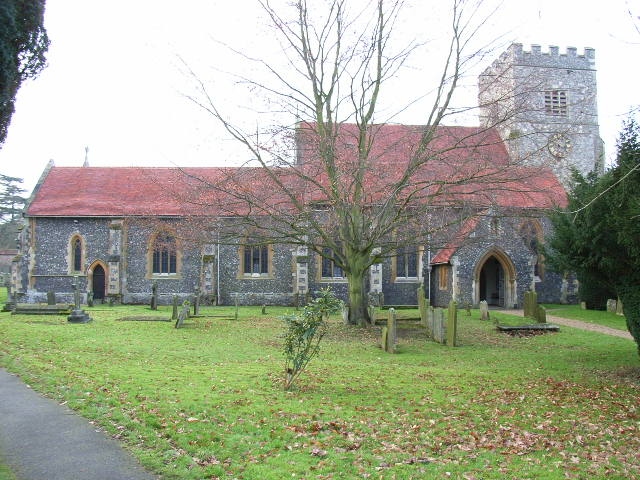
St Andrew's Church, Sonning, where Hugh Pearson was vicar (1842–82).

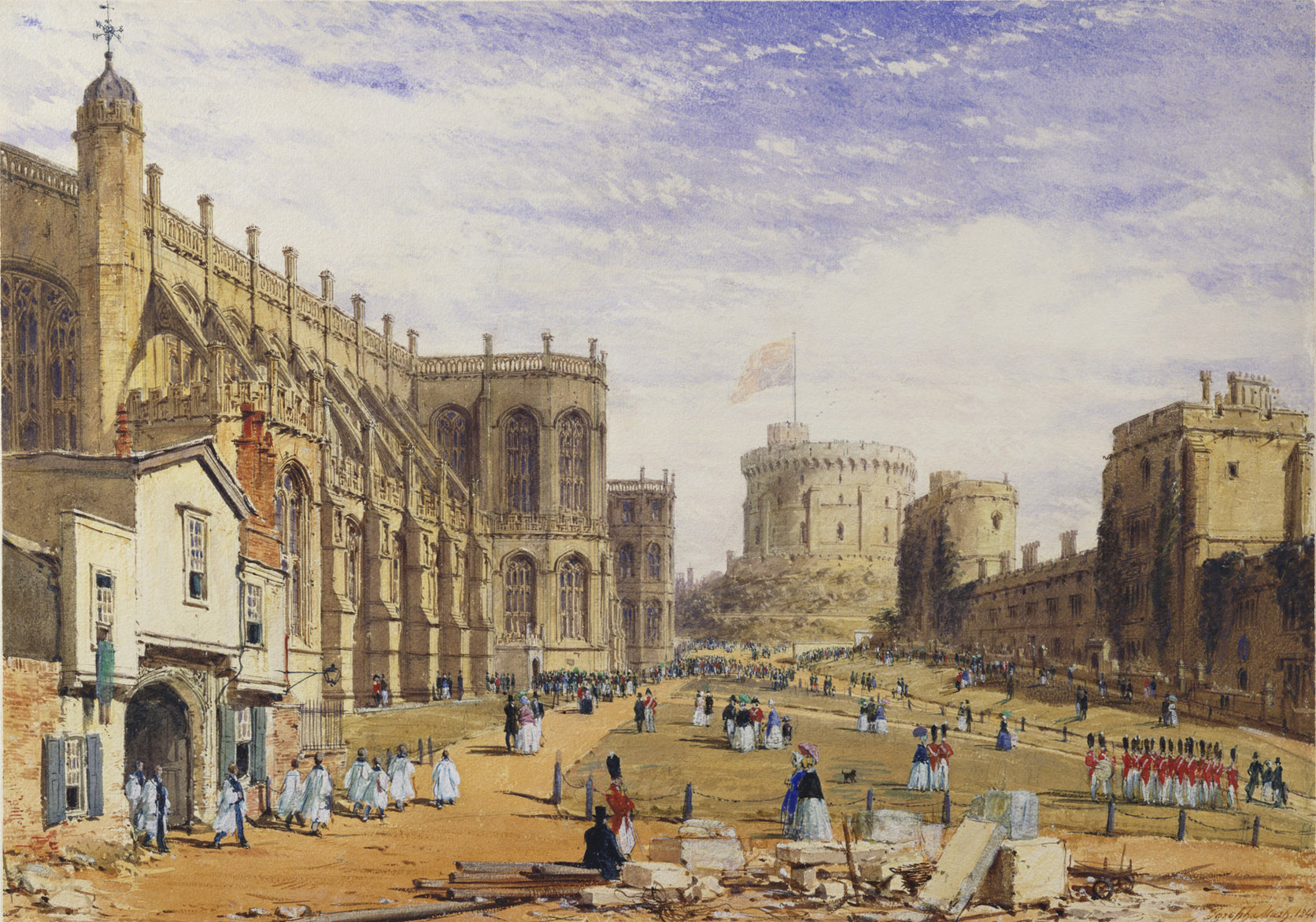
St George's Chapel (left) at Windsor Castle, where Hugh Pearson was a Canon (1876–82).

Hugh Pearson (1817–1882) was vicar of Sonning and a Canon at Windsor, both in Berkshire, England.

== Life ==
Hugh Pearson was the son of Hugh Nicholas Pearson (1776–1856), who was Dean of Salisbury (1823–46). He was born in Oxford and studied briefly at Eton College, before moving on to Harrow School, where he was Head Boy. He then attended Balliol College, Oxford, where he obtained his MA degree in 1841.

Pearson was ordained a Deacon in 1841 and became a curate at Withyham, near Tunbridge Wells in the same year. He moved to the Thames-side village of Sonning (then in the Diocese of Salisbury) as vicar in the following year and became a notable Victorian vicar at St Andrew's Church there for forty years. Soon after he arrived, he suffered a riding accident on a bridge at the then newly created Sonning Cutting on the Great Western Railway, when his horse bolted due to a passing steam train. This was a possible reason why he did not move on to higher office and he remained vicar of Sonning for the rest of his life.

While Pearson was vicar, many changes to the church took place. He arrived at Sonning in 1842 to find the church in poor repair. The church as it can be seen today is largely Victorian, with major restoration started by Henry Woodyer in 1852.

Pearson was the brother of Henry Hugh Pierson (12 April 1815 – 28 January 1873) was an English composer resident from 1845 in Germany.

Pearson was a close friend of Arthur Penrhyn Stanley (1815–1881), Dean of Westminster, who also attended Balliol College. In addition, many of Pearson's curates at Sonning were from Balliol.

From 1876 until his death in 1882, Pearson was also a Canon of the Eleventh Stall at St George's Chapel within Windsor Castle, during the reign of Queen Victoria. He collapsed on Easter Sunday, during Holy Communion, on 9 April 1882.

== Pearson Hall ==
Pearson Hall (the Sonning village hall) and Pearson Road, in which the hall is located within the village of Sonning, are named in Hugh Pearson's memory. There is a bust of him in Pearson Hall. The village hall was built and opened in 1889 and Sonning Street was renamed to Pearson Road.

== See also ==
- Dean and Canons of Windsor

== Bibliography ==
- Angel Perkins,, Barracuda Books, 1977. ISBN 0-86023-051-1. 2nd edition, Baron Buckingham, 1999. ISBN 0-86023-051-1.
