= French Horn, Sonning Eye =

The French Horn
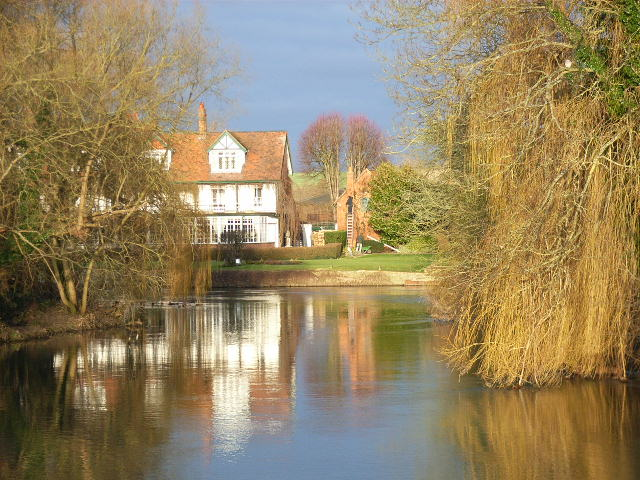
- View from the Sonning Backwater
- Interactive map of The French Horn

Restaurant information
- Owner: Michael Emmanuel
- Head chef: Josiane Diaga
- Food type: [Classic French & British]
- Location: [Play Hatch Road, Sonning on Thames], Reading, Oxfordshire, RG4 6TN, United Kingdom
- Coordinates: 51.47729°N 0.91667°W
- Seating capacity: 70
- Reservations: +44 (0)118 969 2204
- Website: www.thefrenchhorn.co.uk

The French Horn at Sonning is a hotel and restaurant on the banks of the River Thames next to the Sonning Backwater Bridges, at Sonning Eye, Oxfordshire, England. The hotel includes a number of riverside cottages that are now used as rooms for hotel clients. There is an old, rusty iron gate with the name of the hotel within the ironwork on the path by the river opposite Sonning Bridge.

Notable clientele included the film director and restaurant critic Michael Winner (died 2013), who has used the location as a film set. It has also featured in the books of Dick Francis.

Close by is The Mill at Sonning, now a dinner theatre. On the opposite Berkshire bank over the main Sonning Bridge is another riverside hotel and restaurant, the Great House at Sonning.

== See also ==
- Great House at Sonning
- Mill at Sonning
