= Battle of Blood River Poort =

1901 battle of the Second Boer War

- Part of Second Boer War
Date	17 September 1901
Location	South African Republic 27°46′S 30°32′E
Result	Boer victory

Belligerents
United Kingdom	South African Republic

Commanders and leaders
Hubert Gough	Louis Botha

Strength
c. 750	1,000

Casualties and losses
23 killed, 21 wounded, 241 men and 2 field guns captured	Light

In the Battle of Blood River Poort or Scheeper's Nek on 17 September 1901 a Boer commando led by Louis Botha crushed a British force commanded by Major Hubert Gough during the Second Boer War.

== Background ==
In August 1901, the Boer leaders determined to send forces south into Natal and the Cape Colony hoping to cause an uprising in the Dutch-majority Cape Colony or at least to gain recruits for their armies. Accordingly, a commando under Botha moved southeast toward Natal while another commando under Jan Smuts raided south into the Cape Colony.

British Intelligence detected the plan, but Botha evaded the British intercepting columns. The cold spring rains made the march especially difficult for the Boers' horses. On 14 September, Botha let his 1,000-man commando camp near Utrecht to permit the horses to recover. Meanwhile, Gough's 24th Mounted Infantry (MI) made a 500-mile (800 km) move by train from Kroonstad in the Orange Free State to Dundee in Natal. Gough received intelligence that Botha and 700 Boers were nearby.

== Battle ==
Gough led his MI from Dundee to De Jaeger's Drift, a ford on the Buffalo River. Dismissing the intelligence report as exaggerated, he led three companies on a reconnaissance across the river. Through his field glasses, he spotted 300 Boers who dismounted at a farm near Blood River Poort. Leaving his colleague Lieutenant-Colonel H. K. Stewart with 450 MI in the rear, Gough moved forward into a plain in the early afternoon, planning to surprise the Boers at the farm. Unknown to Gough, Botha was moving around his right flank with 700 men.

Botha's mounted attack completely swamped Gough's outnumbered force. Lieutenant Llewellyn Price-Davies of the King's Royal Rifle Corps won the Victoria Cross for valiantly defending the field guns. Gough was captured, escaped, captured again and finally escaped on foot in the darkness. On the British side, four officers and 19 other ranks were killed or mortally wounded, 2 officers and 19 men wounded, and 6 officers and 235 men captured. According to Boer policy, the captured were stripped of their weapons and any useful gear, and most of their clothing, and were allowed to walk to the nearest British post. The Boers seized two field guns, 180 rifles and a large quantity of small arms ammunition. The 200 captured horses turned out to be in poor condition and of little use to the raiders. Boer losses were light.

== Aftermath ==
Botha was unable to exploit his victory because he found all the crossings of the Buffalo River blocked by the British. The Boers moved to the southeast, hoping to find a place to cross into Natal. On the Zululand border, Botha attacked a British camp named Fort Itala, believing it to be weakly defended. Instead, the Boers received a bloody nose when 56 of their men were killed or wounded. When Botha realized that British forces were approaching in overwhelming strength, he turned back into the Transvaal, his raid a failure.

== Sources ==
- Stephen Badsey (2008). Doctrine and reform in the British cavalry 1880–1918. Ashgate Publishing, Ltd. ISBN 0-7546-6467-8.
- Pakenham, Thomas (1979). The Boer War. New York: Avon Books. ISBN 0-380-72001-9.
