= Sunninghill =

Sunninghill may refer to:

- Sunninghill, Berkshire, England
- Sunninghill, Gauteng, suburb of Johannesburg, South Africa

== See also ==
- Sunninghill Park, country house and estate in Berkshire, England
- Sunninghill and Ascot, a civil parish in the Royal Borough of Windsor and Maidenhead, England
- Sun Hill (disambiguation)
