= Sonning Eye =

Hamlet on the River Thames in Oxfordshire, England

Coordinates: 51°28′34″N 0°54′56″W

- Hamlet
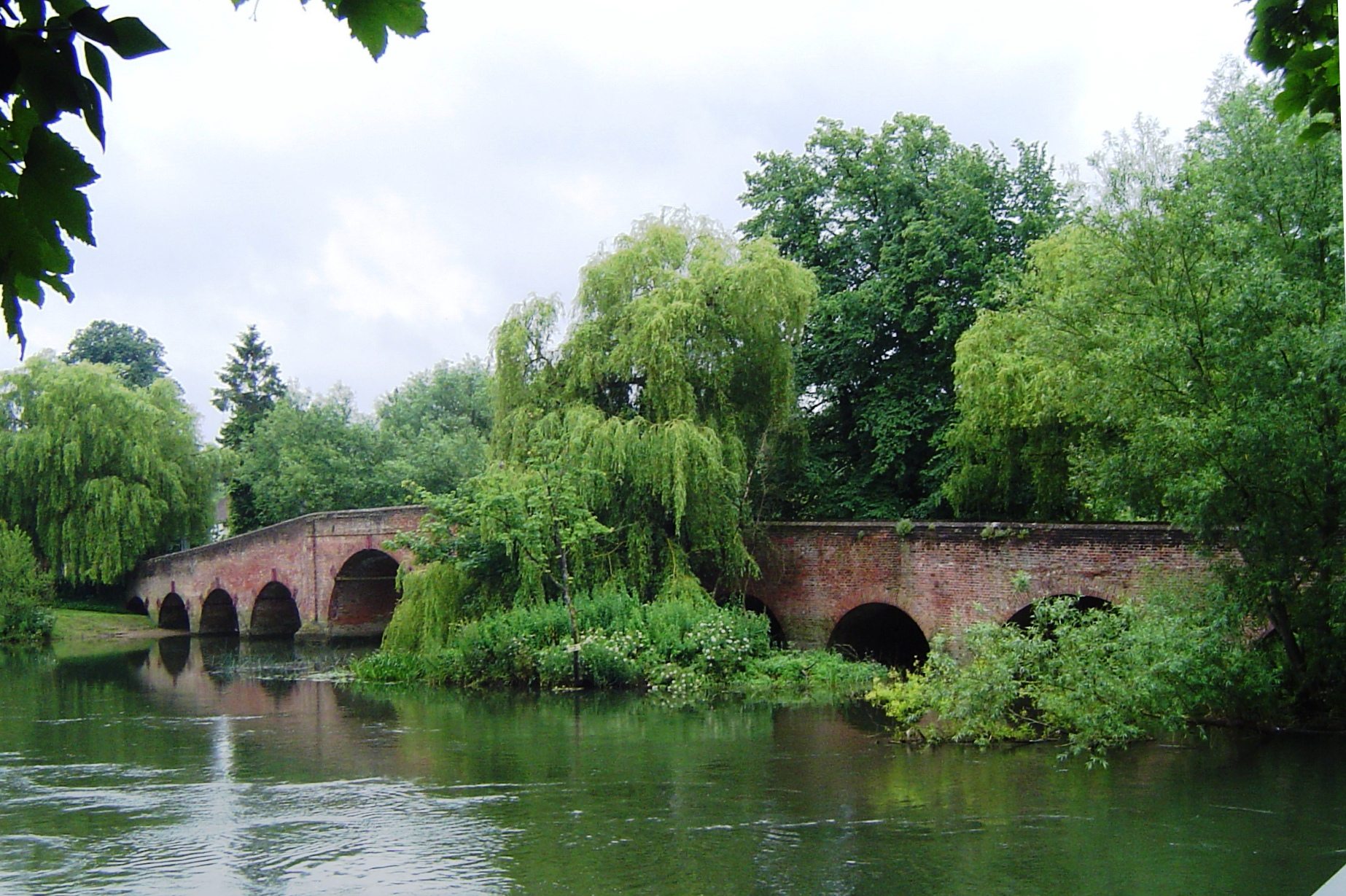
- Sonning Bridge from the Sonning Eye bank of the River Thames

- Location within Oxfordshire
- OS grid reference: SU7576
- Civil parish: Eye & Dunsden
- District: South Oxfordshire
- Shire county: Oxfordshire
- Region: South East
- Country: England
- Sovereign state: United Kingdom
- Post town: HENLEY-ON-THAMES
- Postcode district: RG4
- Dialling code: 0118
- Police: Thames Valley
- Fire: Oxfordshire
- Ambulance: South Central
- UK Parliament: Henley
- Website: Eye & Dunsden Parish Council

Sonning Eye is a hamlet on the River Thames in the Sonning Common ward of South Oxfordshire, England, in the civil parish of Eye & Dunsden (one of its four small settlements), at what is, since 1974, the southernmost tip of Oxfordshire.

== Geography ==
Sonning Eye is about 3 miles (4.8 km) northeast of Reading, Berkshire. Sonning Eye is opposite the village of Sonning, Berkshire, to which it is linked by crossing the 18th-century brick-arched Sonning Bridge combined with Sonning Backwater Bridges. Sonning Eye is surrounded by the alluvial floodplain of the River Thames, much of which has been extracted for gravel, forming a number of lakes, especially upstream on this bank.

In particular, a long rowing lake has been made, the Redgrave Pinsent Rowing Lake, named after Olympic oarsmen Steve Redgrave and Matthew Pinsent. Other local sports include sailing and water skiing. Berry Brook, a small tributary runs through the floodplain west and north of Sonning Eye, joining the Thames at Hallsmead Ait to the northeast. On the riverside near the Sonning Backwater Bridges is the French Horn, a luxury hotel and restaurant. There is a small public car park here, a place to launch small boats, and a grass area by the river bank that is popular with fishermen.

== History ==
Its toponym "Sonning" is derived from the Anglo-Saxon chieftain Sunna and "Eye" meaning island (cf. eyot) since it is a small gravel mound surrounded by the river's flood plain. Within this low land is a true island (permanent since management of the river levels) on the Thames. Until 1866, Sonning Eye formed part of the Oxfordshire section of Sonning civil parish. The heart of Sonning Eye is a conservation area, including 12 architecturally Grade II listed buildings, five of which are barns that have now been converted for modern use. One house has some excellent William De Morgan tiles.

== Buildings of the island ==
The island is roughly heart-shaped, cut through by a millrace. On the islet is The Mill at Sonning, a restored 18th-century watermill on a medieval site, now converted to a dinner theatre. The millrace runs through what is now the theatre bar, and powers a small turbine powering an 18.5 kW hydroelectric generator that supplies the National Grid. Set behind this on the island is Mill House, a Grade II listed building owning some of the 5 acres (2.0 ha) island.

It was originally built in the 17th century and once owned by the wealthy Rich family, Lords of the Manor of Sonning, hence owning its manor house towards the top of Sonning's Thames Street as well. Sir Thomas Rich founded Sir Thomas Rich's School just south of here in 1766 by endowing it with the income with his neighbouring farmland. In 2014, the Mill House was bought by the American film star George Clooney and his British wife, human rights lawyer Amal Alamuddin, at a cost of around £10 million.

== Paintings and sketches ==
The area has been a favourite location for artists, especially views of the old, disused brick bridge and viaduct from the river bank just downstream of the island with surrounding lush flora. George Price Boyce, the Victorian watercolour painter associated with the Pre-Raphaelite art movement, visited and painted in the area.

== Gallery ==
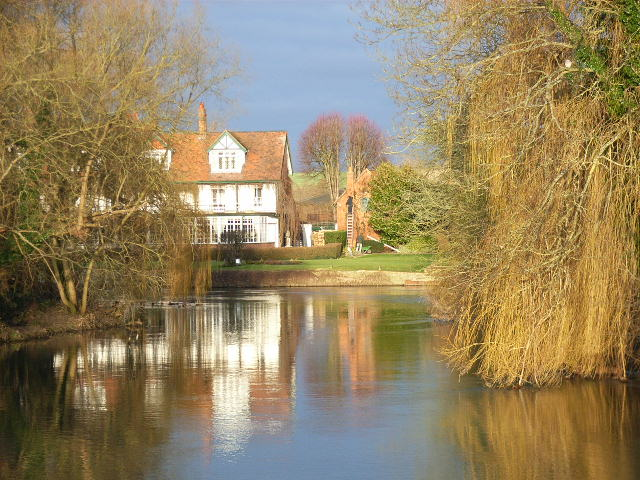
Backwater of the Thames at Sonning Eye, with a view of the French Horn at Sonning.

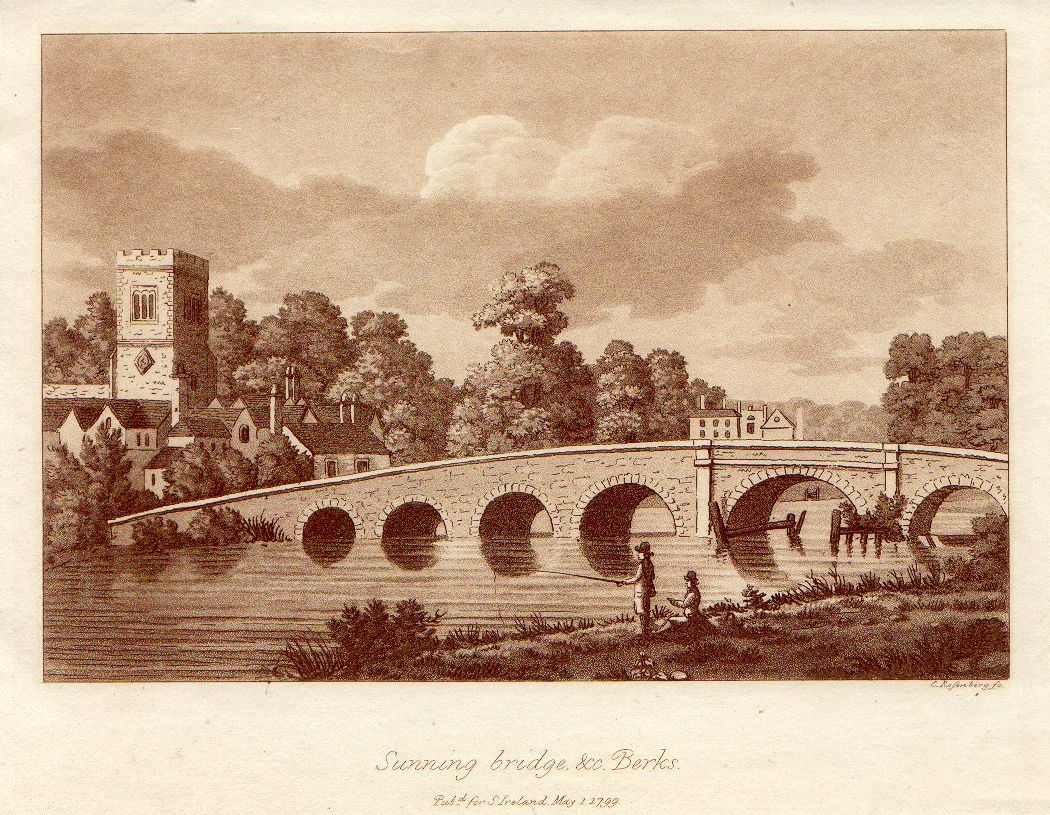
Print of Sonning Bridge (1799), linking Sonning Eye (right) with Sonning (left) and St Andrew's Church tower in the background

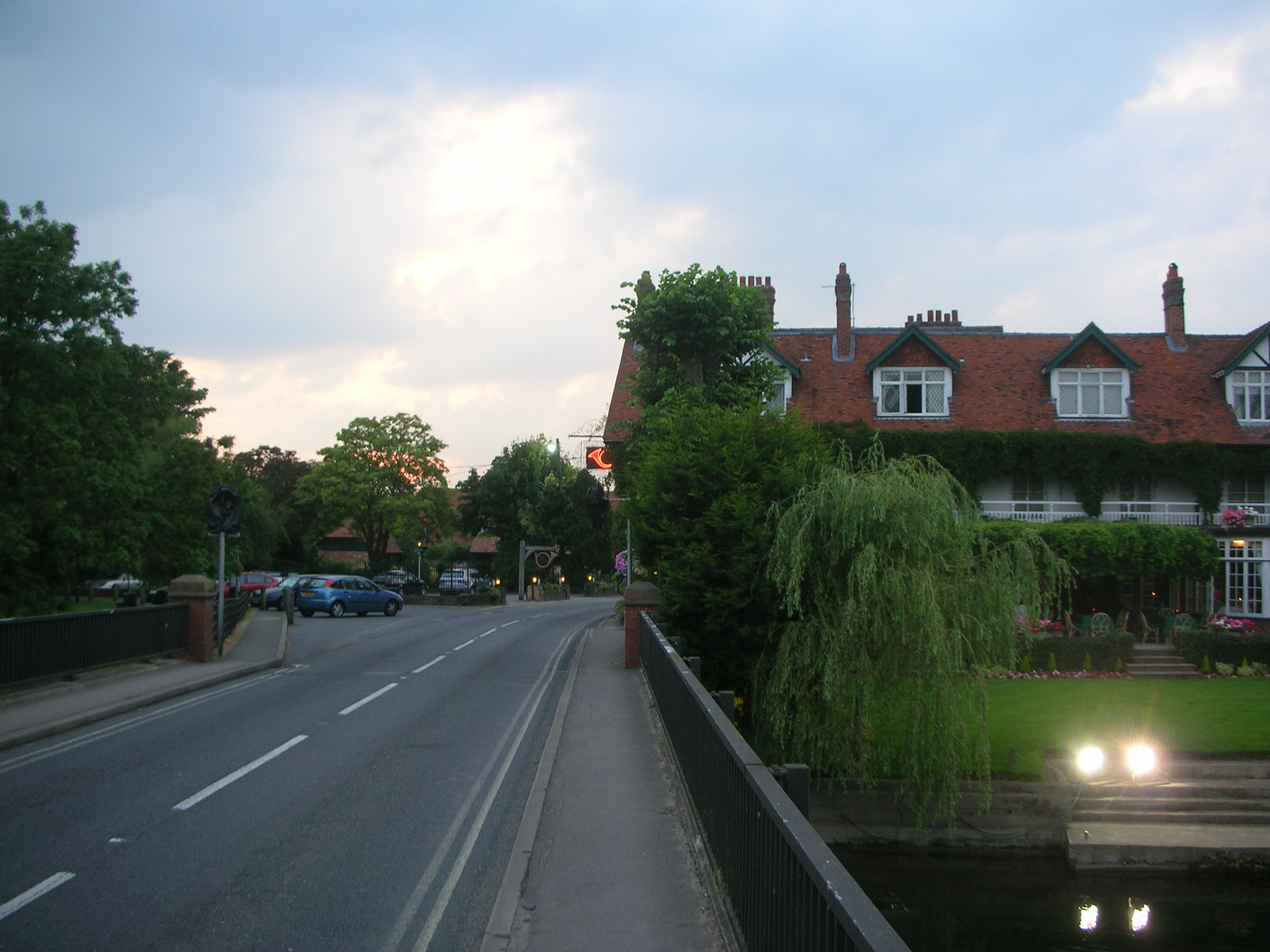
View from the main Sonning Backwater Bridge along the B478 road in Sonning Eye with the French Horn hotel on the right

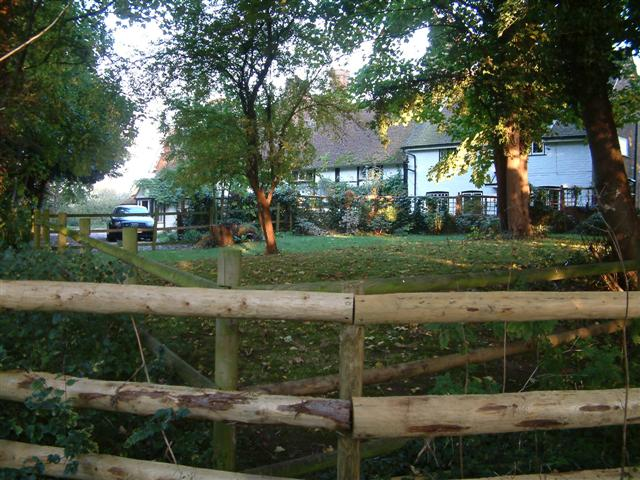
Waterside cottages at Sonning Eye

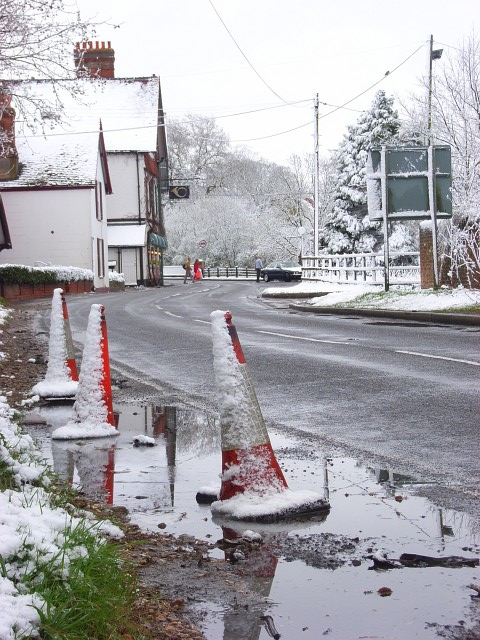
View of the B478 road in the snow with the French Horn in the background

== See also ==
- Caversham Lakes
- Islands in the River Thames
- List of civil parishes in England
- List of places in Oxfordshire
- Redgrave Pinsent Rowing Lake
- Sonning Bridge
- Sonning Regatta

Next island upstream	River Thames	Next island downstream
Sonning Hill island	Sonning Eye	Buck Ait
