= Sonning =

Coordinates: 51°28′23″N 0°54′40″W

- Village and civil parish
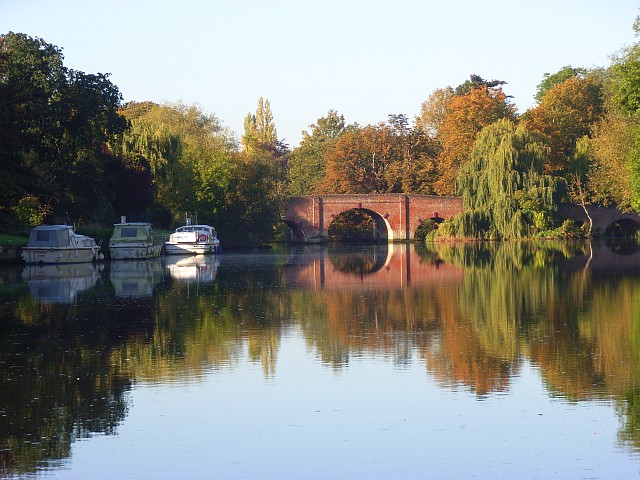
- The River Thames, Sonning

- Location within Berkshire
- Population: 1,612 (Parish, 2021)
- OS grid reference: SU757755
- Civil parish: Sonning
- Unitary authority: Wokingham
- Ceremonial county: Berkshire
- Region: South East
- Country: England
- Sovereign state: United Kingdom
- Post town: READING
- Postcode district: RG4
- Dialling code: 0118
- Police: Thames Valley
- Fire: Royal Berkshire
- Ambulance: South Central
- UK Parliament: Earley and Woodley

Sonning (traditional: /ˈsʌnɪŋ/; modern: /ˈsɒnɪŋ/) is a village and civil parish in Berkshire, England, on the River Thames, east of Reading. The village was described by Jerome K. Jerome in his book Three Men in a Boat as "the most fairy-like little nook on the whole river".

== Toponymy ==
The place-name Sonning seems to contain an Old English personal name, Sunna, + ingas (Old English), 'The village of the people of . . .' ; 'the village of the people called after . . .', so probably, 'homestead/village of Sunna's people', the Sunningas. Sonning appears in the Domesday Book of 1086 as Soninges.

== Geography ==
The north-western boundary is formed by the River Thames before passing through the middle of the Thames Valley Park. The southern border follows the railway line. The north-eastern boundary travels over Charvil Hill and follows the edge of the housing at Charvil itself until it reaches the confluence of St Patrick's Stream with the Thames, near St Patrick's Bridge. The northern corner of the parish consists of very low-lying land adjoining the river.

The Sonning Golf Course sits in the southeast corner, with Holme Park, Sonning Hill and the business park in the southwest, and the village roughly in the middle. Sonning village is at a crossing point of the River Thames, where the narrow arched Sonning Bridge on the B478 crosses the river to the hamlet of Sonning Eye on the Oxfordshire bank. Just upstream of the bridge is Sonning Lock. The old village is now joined to further housing along Pound Lane and the A4 Bath Road. It lies some 4 miles (6.4 km) east of the major town of Reading. In other directions, this would put it within the Reading suburban sprawl, but Sonning remains a clearly delineated small village. Most of the village together with the grounds of Reading Blue Coat School forms a Conservation Area.

== History ==
In Anglo-Saxon times, the village was of considerable importance as the lesser centre of the bishopric of Ramsbury, sometimes called the see of Ramsbury and Sonning. The church was a secondary cathedral and the present structure, St Andrew's Church, contains reused Anglo-Saxon carvings. By the 12th century Sonning church had eight dependent churches, four of which had become independent parishes by the 15th century. This is an example of the organisation of the Anglo-Saxon church into minsters with their own parochially known as the minster system.

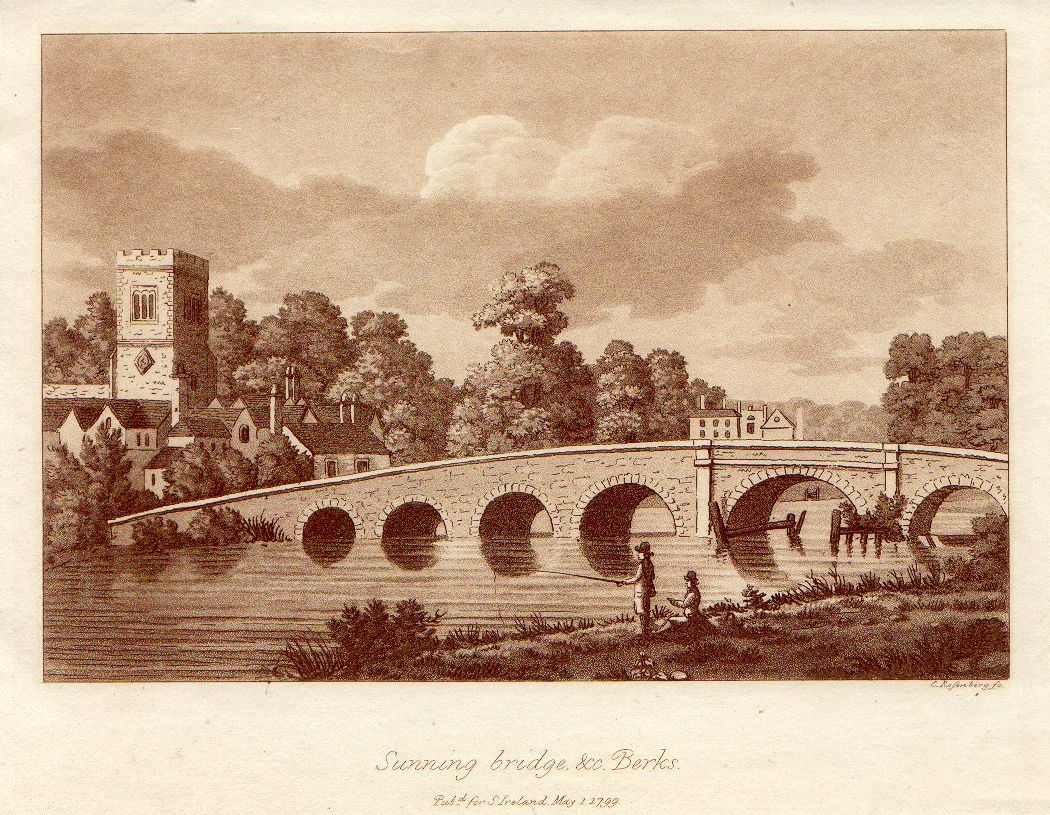
Print of Sonning Bridge (1799) with the tower of St Andrew's Church, Sonning, in the background.

Sonning prospered as an important stopping post for travellers, both by road and by boat. There were a number of ancient hostelries where they could have stayed, notably the Great House on the site of the original ferryman's cottage. The Bull Inn had the added bonus of being near the church where pilgrims could venerate a relic of Saint Cyriacus. The Bishops of Salisbury succeeded those of Ramsbury and Sonning and had a bishop's palace in the village until the 16th century. King Richard II's young bride, Queen Isabella of Valois, was kept captive here during his imprisonment and deposition. Aberlash House is a Grade II listed house situated on an island in the River Thames at Sonning. It was originally built in the 17th century and, like much of the village, was formerly owned by the Rich family, Lords of the Manor of Sonning, although they did not live there.

The Great Western Railway passes about 0.5 miles (1 km) south of the village, in a 2-mile (3.2 km) long cutting, Sonning Cutting. It was opened in 1840, and was the scene of one of the first railway disasters in 1841, when a mixed passenger and goods train ran into a landslip. Nine passengers died in the accident, being thrown from the open trucks just behind the engine. Many were stonemasons working on the Houses of Parliament, and the disaster led to changes in the Railways Act, which required that third-class passengers be carried in stoutly constructed carriages rather than open trucks. The Act also created Parliamentary trains for third-class passengers.

Just outside the village, above Sonning Lock, is the independent secondary school, Reading Blue Coat School, in the 19th century manor house, Holme Park. Built in the home park of the old palace, it replaced a Georgian mansion erected for the Lords of the Manor who eventually superseded the bishops. The first of these was Laurence Halstead, partner to the Reading cloth merchant, John Kendrick. In the early 20th century, a second country house was built in the village, the Deanery Garden. It provides a fine example of an Edwin Lutyens house with a Gertrude Jekyll garden, originally designed as a show house for the founder of Country Life magazine.

== Governance ==
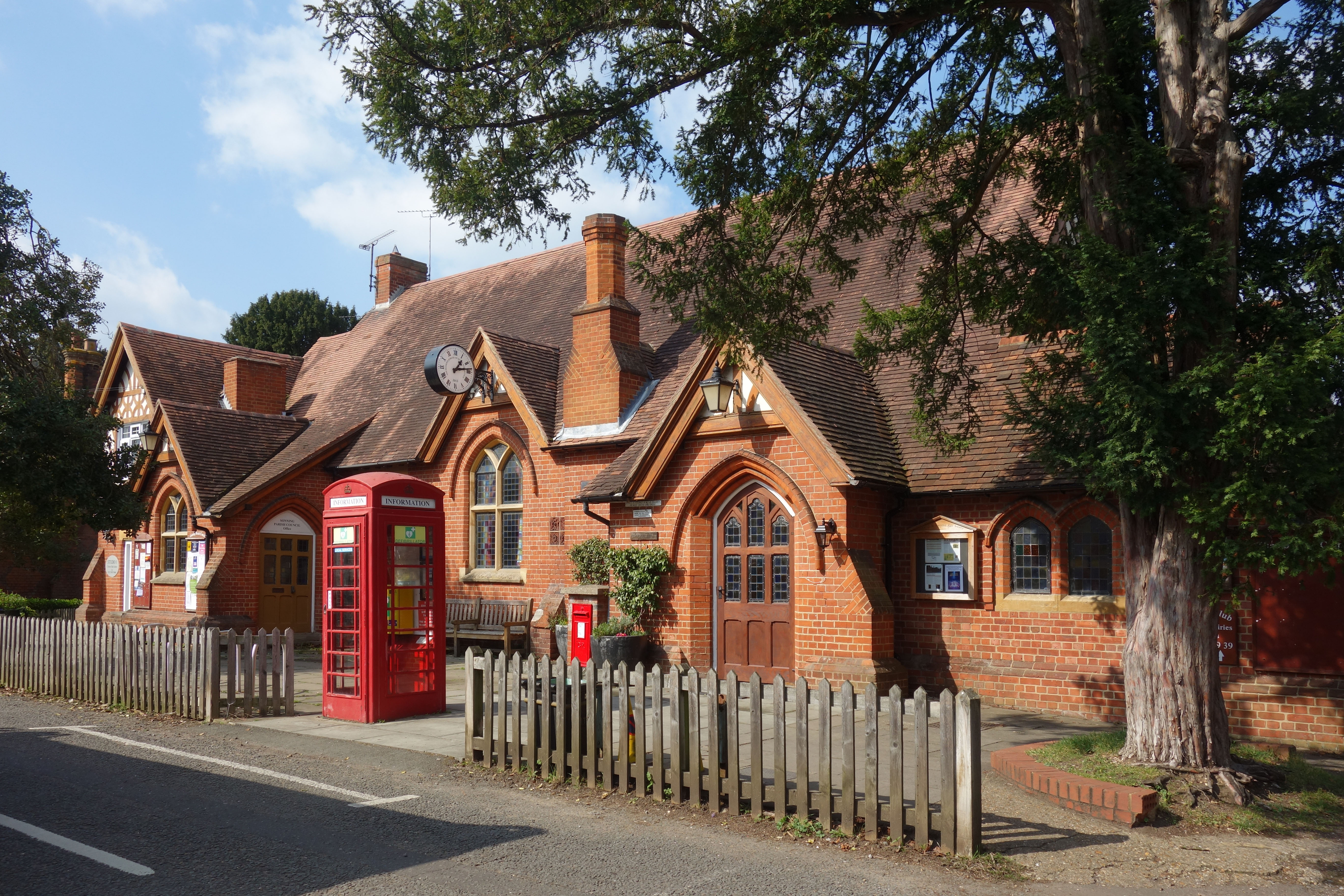
Pearson Hall

There are two tiers of local government covering Sonning, at parish and unitary authority level: Sonning Parish Council and Wokingham Borough Council. The parish council has an office in the village hall, called Pearson Hall, and holds its meetings at the pavilion at the King George V Playing Field on Pound Lane.

=== Administrative history ===
Sonning was an ancient parish, which historically straddled Berkshire and Oxfordshire, and also included some exclaves of Wiltshire at Hurst and Wokingham. The parish was large, and had numerous chapelries with their own chapels of ease, several of which subsequently became separate parishes, including Arborfield (became a separate parish in the 16th century), Sandhurst (separate 1756), Wokingham (separate 1812), Hurst (separate 1831), and Ruscombe (separate by 1835).

By the mid 19th century, the remaining area of Sonning parish was subdivided into four townships: Earley, Eye and Dunsden, Woodley and Sandford, and a Sonning or 'Sonning Town' township covering the central part of the parish around the village itself. The Eye and Dunsden township was in Oxfordshire, and the other three townships were in Berkshire. Each of those four townships had taken on civil functions under the poor laws from the 17th century onwards, and as such also became civil parishes in 1866 when the legal definition of 'parish' was changed to be the areas used for administering the poor laws. The ecclesiastical and civil definitions of the parish therefore diverged after 1866. Further civil parishes from the area of the ancient parish were subsequently created for Sonning Common (from Eye and Dunsden) in 1952, and Charvil (from Woodley and Sandford) in 1970.

== Demography ==
At the 2021 census, the population of the parish was 1,612. The population had been 1,445 in 2001, and 1,631 in 2011.

== Transport ==
The main road through Sonning is the B478, running from the bridge to the Charvil roundabout on the A4. The B4446 runs north from the A4 to the village. The A4 itself passes through the south of the parish. The Great Western Main Line passes through Sonning Cutting, though there is no station. On the Thames, there are moorings both above and below Sonning Lock, as well as in the weir stream.

=== Twinning ===
Sonning is twinned with Ligugé, France. The village has an active twinning association and the lane to the village primary school is called Ligugé Way.

== Media ==
Sonning Parish Magazine, established in 1869, serves Sonning and the neighbouring village of Charvil.

== Sport and leisure ==
Sonning has a King George's Field in memorial to George V, where Sonning Cricket Club plays. There are playing fields between Sonning and the main A4 road, including hockey and rugby fields. Sonning Hockey Club, Reading Hockey Club, Reading R.F.C., and Berkshire Shire Hall R.F.C. can all be found on Sonning Lane. Sonning Hockey Club was the first club in the county of Berkshire to be awarded Club 1st National Hockey Accreditation for junior coaching and development. The club also has squash courts and tennis courts.

Rams RFC is nearby, off the Old Bath Road. Sonning Golf Club is on the other side of the A4 road. Sonning Regatta restarted in 2000 and is held every two years just upstream from Sonning Lock. There is sailing and waterskiing on the Caversham Lakes across the Thames and the Redgrave Pinsent Rowing Lake has recently been created there as well.

The Sonning Village Show, started in the 1960s by the local Women's Institute, is held every September at the village primary school.

== Notable residents ==
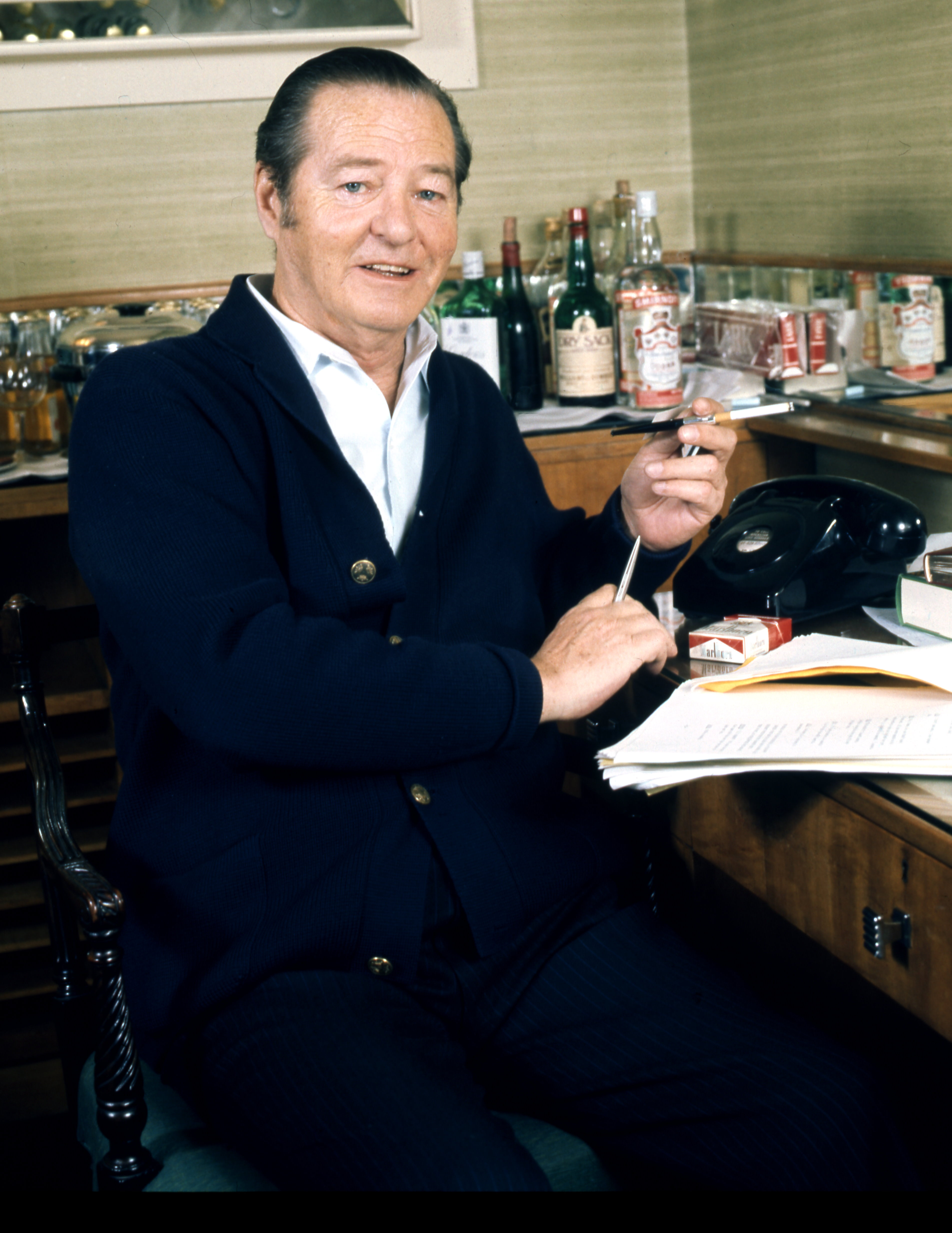
The playwright Sir Terence Rattigan, who lived at The Red House in Sonning, 1945–47.

Notable former and current village inhabitants include:

- Nigel Broackes, the managing director of Trafalgar House
- George Clooney, American film star and his wife, human rights lawyer Amal Clooney
- Anthony Farindon, 17th-century Royalist preacher
- Uri Geller, Israeli illusionist, magician, television personality, and self-proclaimed psychic
- Laurence Halstead, 17th-century cloth merchant and partner of philanthropist, John Kendrick
- Neil Hamilton Fairley, Australian physician and soldier
- Glenn Hoddle, football manager and former footballer
- William Holman Hunt, the Pre-Raphaelite artist, in his later life at The Acre
- Isabella of Valois, Queen consort of Richard II
- Ric Lee, drummer for the 1970s group Ten Years After
- Jon Lord, composer and founder member of the 1970s group Deep Purple
- Philip May, investment relationship manager and the husband of former Prime Minister Theresa May
- Theresa May, British Prime Minister 2016–2019, was the former local Member of parliament; she and her husband live in the village.
- Jimmy Page, lead guitarist of the rock group Led Zeppelin
- Hugh Pearson, Victorian vicar of Sonning, later a Canon at Windsor Castle
- Terence Rattigan, dramatist, briefly at The Red House during 1945-47 – there is a blue plaque
- Thomas Rich, 17th-century merchant, money-lender to the King and benefactor to both Sonning and Gloucester
- Dick Turpin, reputedly, at his aunt's house, now called Turpins
- Admiral Villeneuve, subsequent to his capture at the Battle of Trafalgar, at The Grove
- Robert Wright, 17th-century Bishop of Lichfield & Coventry and vicar of Sonning
- Laurence Fitton, 15th-century member of parliament for Marlborough
- Dwight D. Eisenhower, president of the United States of America
- Tony Gubba, journalist and sports commentator

The following recipients of the Victoria Cross are buried in the churchyard of St Andrew's Church:

- Edmund John Phipps-Hornby
- Llewellyn Alberic Emilius Price-Davies

== Bibliography ==
- Angel Perkins, The Book of Sonning, Barracuda Books, 1977. ISBN 0-86023-051-1. 2nd edition, Baron Buckingham, 1999. ISBN 0-86023-051-1.
