= Deanery Garden =

Historic country house in Berkshire, England

Coordinates: 51.47437°N 0.91134°W

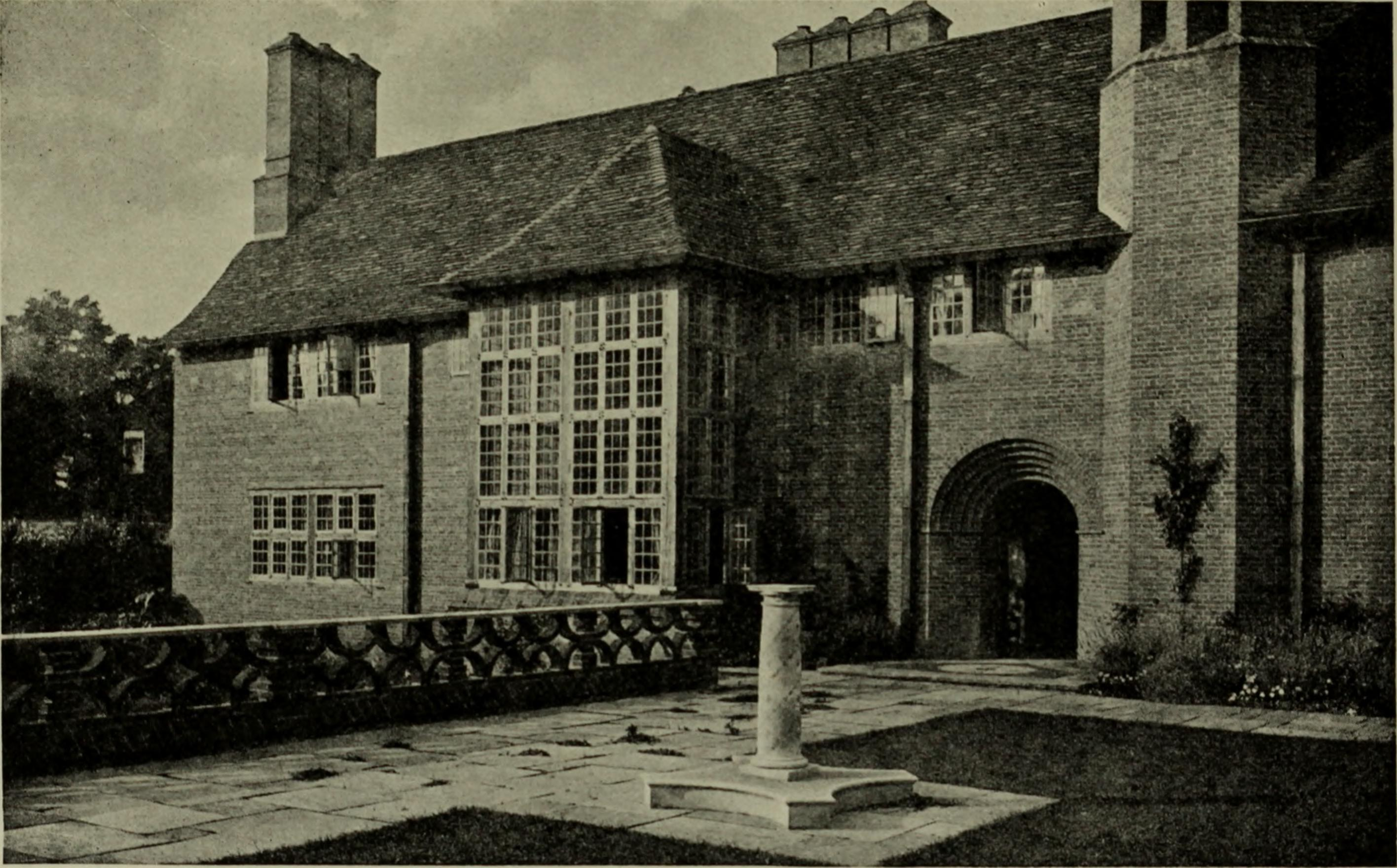
South, garden front of the house, 1921

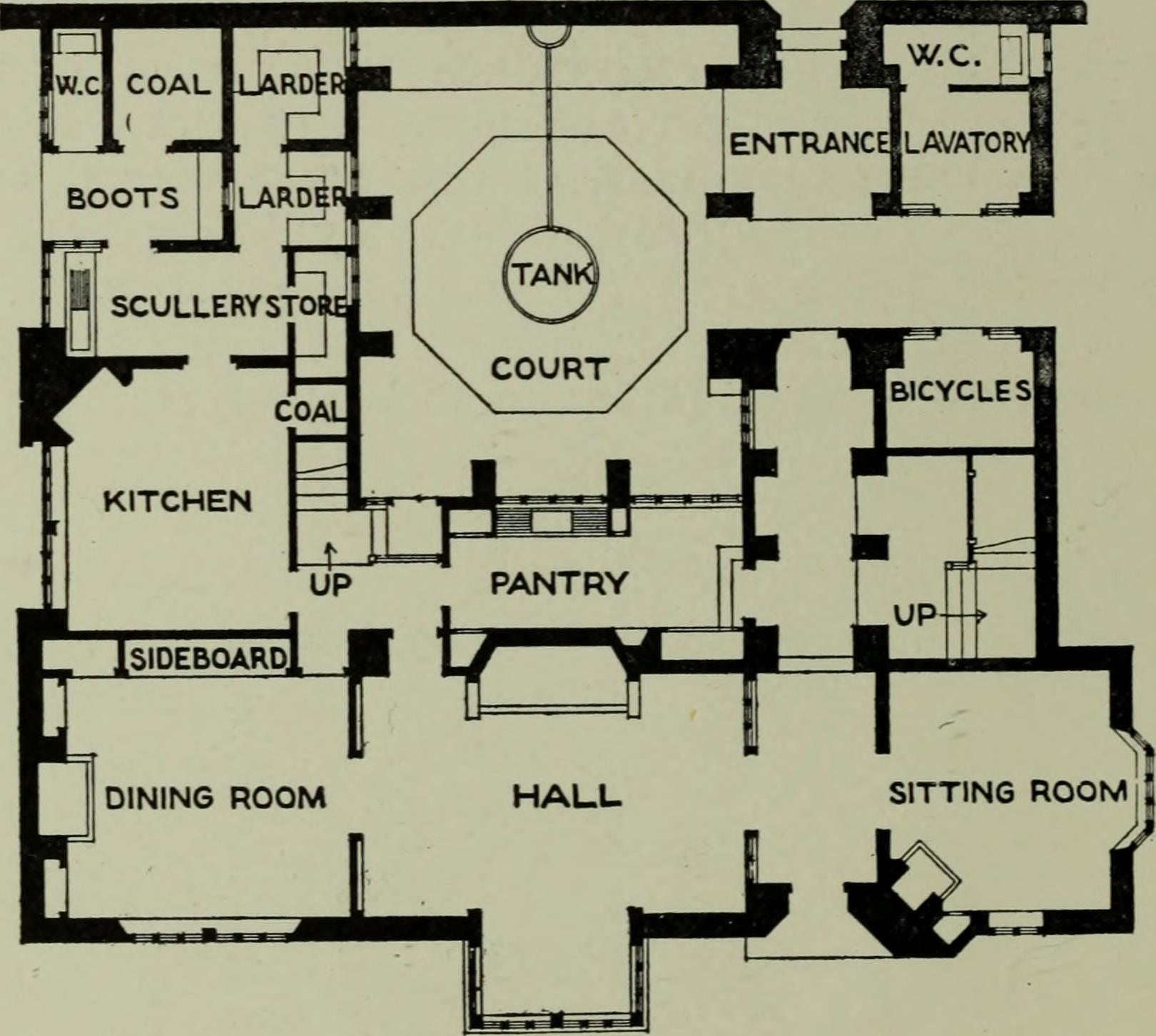
House ground floor plan, 1921

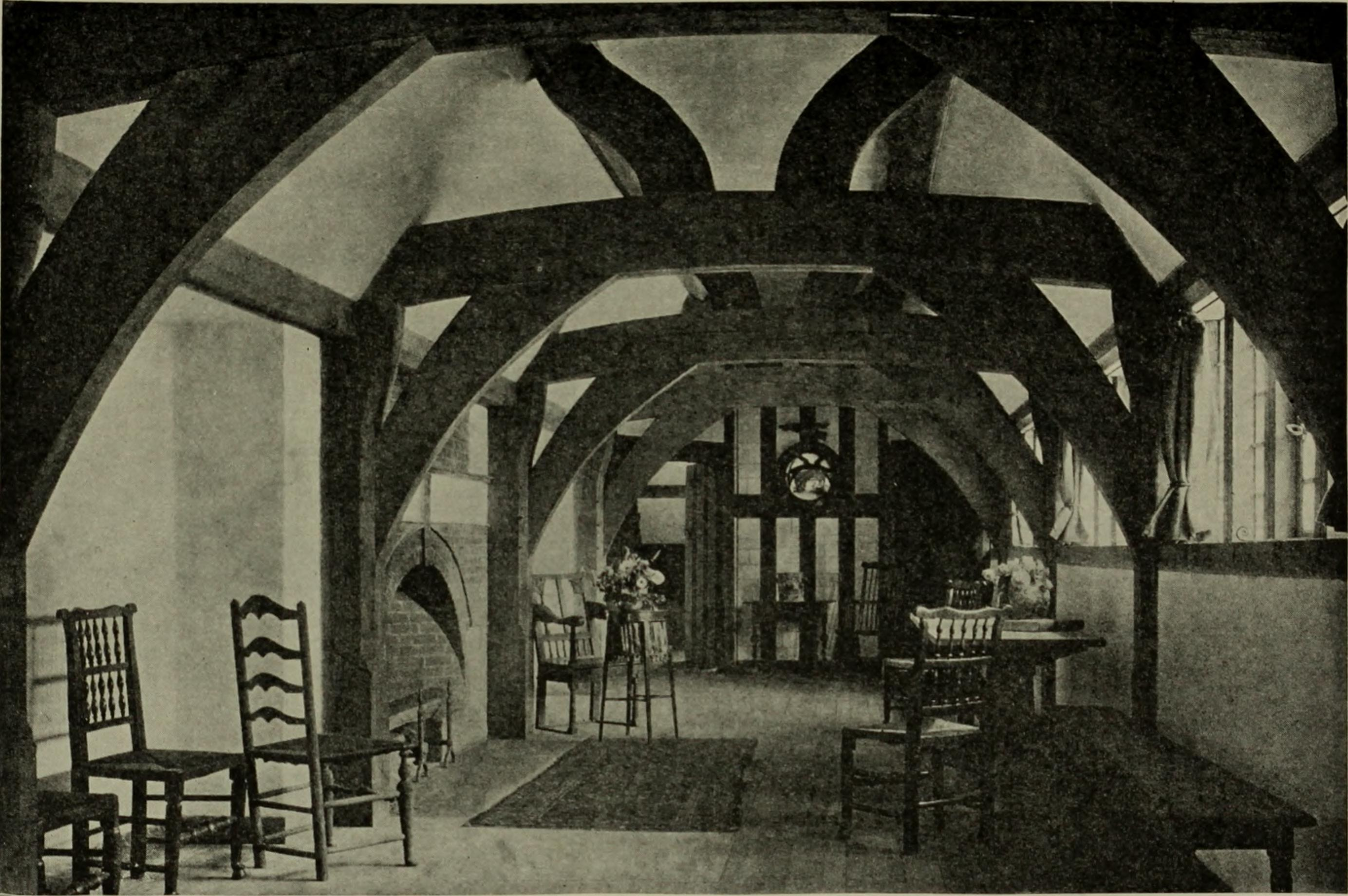
The upstairs gallery, 1921

Deanery Garden (or The Deanery) is an Arts and Crafts style house and garden in Sonning, Berkshire, England. The house was designed and built by architect Edwin Lutyens between 1899 and 1901. It is a Grade I listed building. The gardens—laid out by Lutyens and planted by garden designer Gertrude Jekyll—are Grade II* listed in the National Register of Historic Parks and Gardens.

== Design and construction ==
The house was built for the founder of the early lifestyle magazine Country Life, Edward Hudson, essentially as a show home. It was featured in the magazine. The house has subsequently been considerably extended on its north side. The garden (c. 1 hectare) was planted by Gertrude Jekyll. Although in the centre of the village next to St Andrew's Church and the Bull Inn, the house and garden are very secluded, being surrounded by high walls. However, the garden can be viewed from the church tower.

== Owners ==
Deanery Garden was owned by Nigel Broackes (from the early 1970s) and Stanley Seeger during the 1980s. Marian Thompson helped to restore the garden. The house and gardens, which are now owned by Jimmy Page, guitarist with the group Led Zeppelin, are not open to the public.
