= Sonning Bishop's Palace =

Former bishop's palace

Coordinates: 51.47328°N 0.91381°W

Sonning Bishop's Palace was a former episcopal palace at Sonning, east of Reading, in Berkshire, England.

The palace was in Holme Park near the River Thames. It was a residence of the Bishops of Salisbury.

In 1135, while staying at the palace, Bishop Roger of Salisbury attended the funeral of King Henry I at Reading Abbey. In September 1216, King John stayed for six days at the palace. In 1337, defences were added by Bishop Robert Wyville of Salisbury. After the abdication of King Richard II and his cousin King Henry IV's coronation in October 1399, Richard II's then 9-year-old wife, Isabella, was kept under house arrest at the palace.

The Bishops of Salisbury continued in residence, some more often than others, until they sold it to Queen Elizabeth I. She visited the palace twice, but later it fell into disrepair.

The site of the palace was excavated in 1912–14 and evidence of a hall, chapel and other rooms was found. The remains dated from the 13th century with alterations in the 14th and 15th centuries. The buildings were surrounded by a moat on three sides.

Today nothing can be seen of the palace from the surface apart from some unevenness in the ground. It is in a grass field used for cows between St Andrew's Church and Sonning Lock.
