= The Mill at Sonning =

Theatre and restaurant

Coordinates: 51.47594°N 0.91577°W

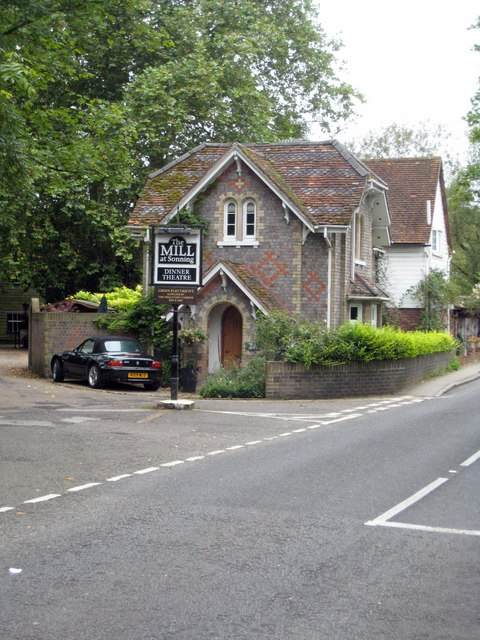
Entrance to the Mill theatre-restaurant in Sonning Eye.

The Mill at Sonning is a professional theatre and restaurant, converted from a circa-1800 flour mill on earlier foundations, on an island in the River Thames at Sonning Eye in the English county of Berkshire.

The river divides into three, with the mill race forming the middle branch, spanned by one of the Sonning Backwater Bridges just downstream of the mill. The original mill was established much earlier and was mentioned in the Domesday Book. During the 19th and early 20th centuries, the mill was owned by the well-known local families of May and Witherington, and it produced flour for Huntley and Palmer biscuits in the nearby town of Reading. More recently, the Mill complex has been converted into a 215-seat air-conditioned theatre, with a restaurant for pre-theatre meals and also a bar, where the original watermill is now exposed to view. Close by is the French Horn hotel, also on the river.

The famous actor, director, and animal welfare activist, Peter Egan, was artistic director of the Mill 1982-1984.

The theatre has a small hydroelectric generator of 18.5 kW capacity, commissioned in June 2005. This was the first such installation on the Thames, predating the one at Windsor Castle. In 1984, the Mill at Sonning was given a conservation award by The Times newspaper and the Royal Institution of Chartered Surveyors for the design, restoration and conversion of the derelict mill into a dinner theatre, playtosee.com.

The theatre's first artistic director was Peter Egan. Productions have included performances by Anthony Valentine, Judi Dench, June Whitfield, Adam Faith, Michael Denison, Dulcie Gray, John Junkin and Brian Cant.

The Mill adjoins the Mill House, a circa-1800 house based on earlier foundations, acquired by the American film actor George Clooney and his wife, British human rights lawyer Amal Clooney, in 2014.

== See also ==
- List of dinner theaters
