= St Andrew's Church, Sonning =

Coordinates: 51.47407°N 0.91314°W

St Andrew's Church
- The Parish Church of St Andrew
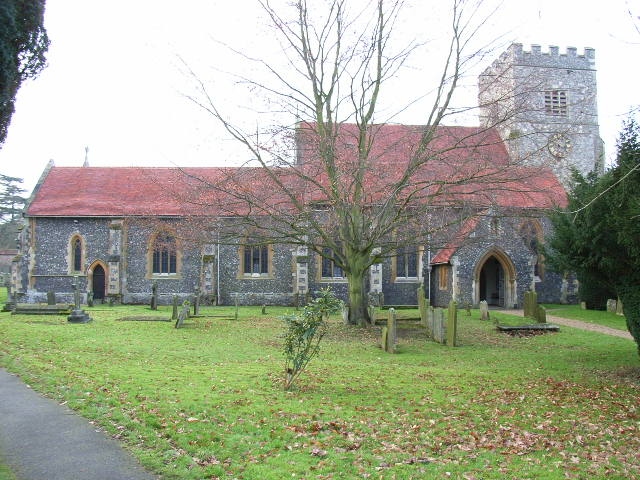
- St Andrew's Church from the north
- St Andrew's Church
- OS grid reference: SU 75588 75571
- Location: Sonning, Berkshire
- Country: England
- Denomination: Church of England
- Website: www.sonningparish.org.uk

History
- Status: Active

Architecture
- Functional status: Parish Church
- Heritage designation: Grade II*
- Designated: 26 January 1967
- Style: Victorian Gothic
- Years built: 1852–3, 1876, etc.

Administration
- Diocese: Diocese of Oxford
- Archdeaconry: Archdeaconry of Berkshire
- Deanery: Deanery of Sonning
- Parish: Parish of Sonning

Clergy
- Vicar: The Revd James Taylor

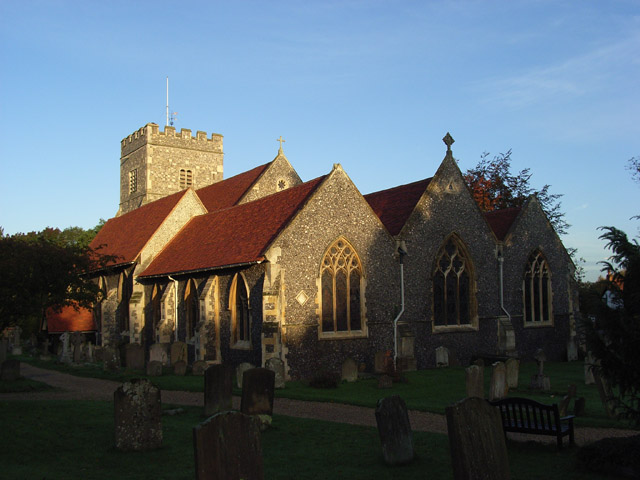
View of the church from the east.

St Andrew's Church is Church of England parish church in a central position in the village of Sonning, close to the River Thames, in the English county of Berkshire. It is notable for its fine array of church monuments and for being the successor of an Anglo-Saxon Cathedral.

== Location ==
The church is located close to the historic Bishop's Palace, which has long since disappeared apart from some grassy mounds. The historic Bull Inn is immediately next to the church away from the river and is owned by the church. Also adjoining the churchyard is Deanery Gardens, an early 20th-century Edwin Lutyens house with a Gertrude Jekyll garden, well hidden by high walls apart from a good view from the top of the church tower. Close by is the brick-built Sonning Bridge, leading over the Thames into Oxfordshire, with the Great House at Sonning, a historic public house, now a hotel and restaurant, next to it on the river.

== History ==
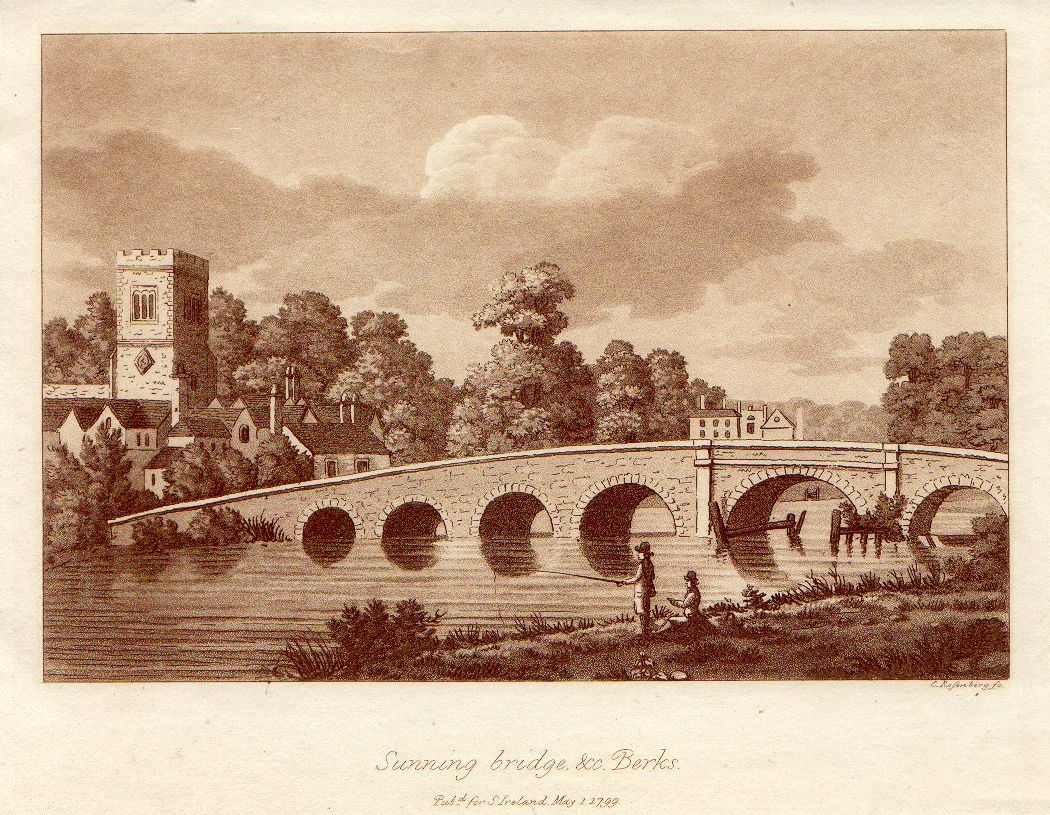
Print of Sonning Bridge (1799) with the tower of St Andrew's Church, Sonning, in the background.

Sonning was the location of an early Saxon minster. In 909 AD, this became one of the two cathedrals of the See of Ramsbury and Sonning. Some Saxon stonework can still be seen in the church today.

The north aisle dates from the 13th century and the south aisle dates from the early 14th century. However, the church as it can be seen today is largely Victorian, with major restoration by Henry Woodyer in 1852–3 and 1876. Of note is the ornate 17th-century monument to Sir Thomas Rich, now hidden in the base of the tower. In 1853, it was called "the vilest paganism imaginable". There is also a fine series of memorial brasses (largely hidden beneath the carpet). The church is a Grade II* listed building.

Hugh Pearson was a notable Victorian vicar at the church, under whom many of the changes took place. Pearson Hall (the village hall) and Pearson Road in the village are named after him.

== Graves ==
Some burials in the churchyard:

- Edmund John Phipps-Hornby VC, CB, CMG, DL (1857–1947), a recipient of the Victoria Cross
- Major General Llewelyn Alberic Emilius Price-Davies VC CB CMG DSO (1878–1965), another recipient of the Victoria Cross
- Brigadier Sir Neil Hamilton Fairley KBE CStJ FRACP FRCP FRCPE FRS (1891–1966), Australian physician and soldier

Some burials in the church:

- John Blagrave (major)
- Robert Wright (bishop)
- Sir Thomas Rich, 1st Baronet
- William Scott, 1st Baron Stowell
- Robert Palmer (MP)
- Hugh Pearson
