= Wargrave =

Village in Berkshire, England

Coordinates: 51.499°N 0.867°W

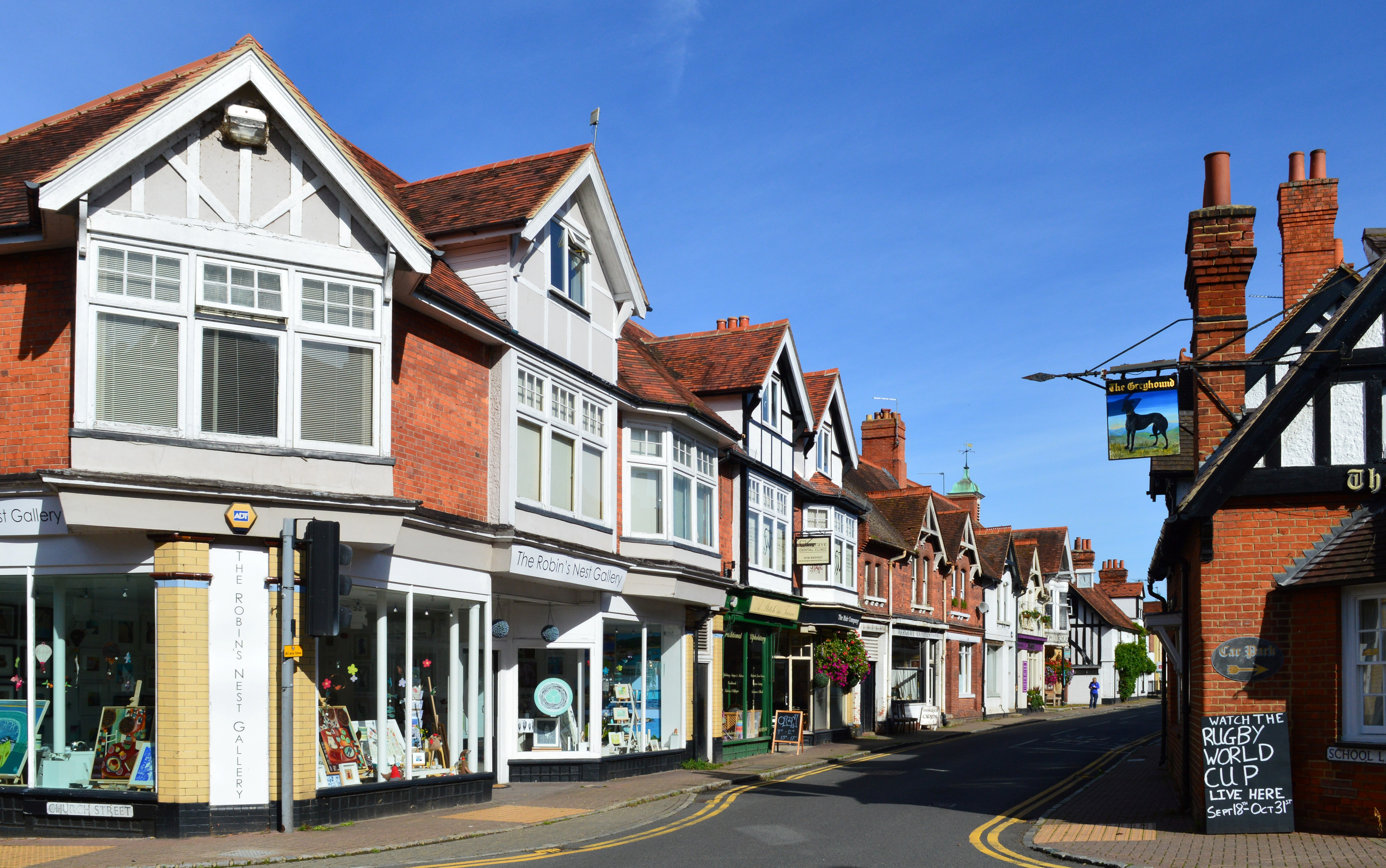

- Location within Berkshire
- Area: 16.28 km^{2} (6.29 sq mi)
- Population: 3,803 (2011 Census)
  - Density: 234/km^{2} (610/sq mi)
- OS grid reference: SU7878
- Civil parish: Wargrave
- Unitary authority: Wokingham
- Ceremonial county: Berkshire
- Region: South East
- Country: England
- Sovereign state: United Kingdom
- Post town: Reading
- Postcode district: RG10
- Dialling code: 0118
- Police: Thames Valley
- Fire: Royal Berkshire
- Ambulance: South Central
- UK Parliament: Maidenhead
- Website: Wargrave Parish Council

Wargrave (/ˈwɔːr.ɡreɪv/) is a historic village and civil parish in Berkshire, England. The village is primarily on the River Thames but also along the confluence of the River Loddon and lies on the border with southern Oxfordshire. The village has many old listed buildings, two marinas with chandlery services for boats, a boating club and rises steeply to the northeast in the direction of Bowsey Hill, with higher parts of the village generally known as Upper Wargrave. In Upper Wargrave is a Recreation Ground with a cricket club, bowls club, football pitches and tennis club.

Wargrave is situated in the A321 road 7 miles (11 km) from both Maidenhead and Reading and 3 miles (4.8 km) from Henley-on-Thames. The village is larger than the county average, having its own railway station on the Henley Branch Line, off the Great Western Main Line from London Paddington; the village is quickly accessible to nearby parts of the M4 corridor, particularly Berkshire and Heathrow Airport and local major centres of employment include Reading and Maidenhead, with smaller businesses and additional commercial facilities in nearby Henley-on-Thames and Wokingham.

== History ==
=== Original forms of name ===
The name Wargrave is derived from 'Weir-Grove', as it was in the Assize Rolls and Patent rolls of the medieval times recorded as 'Weregreave', settling on a slightly different pronunciation after the Great Vowel Shift rendering it Wargrave.

=== Early history ===
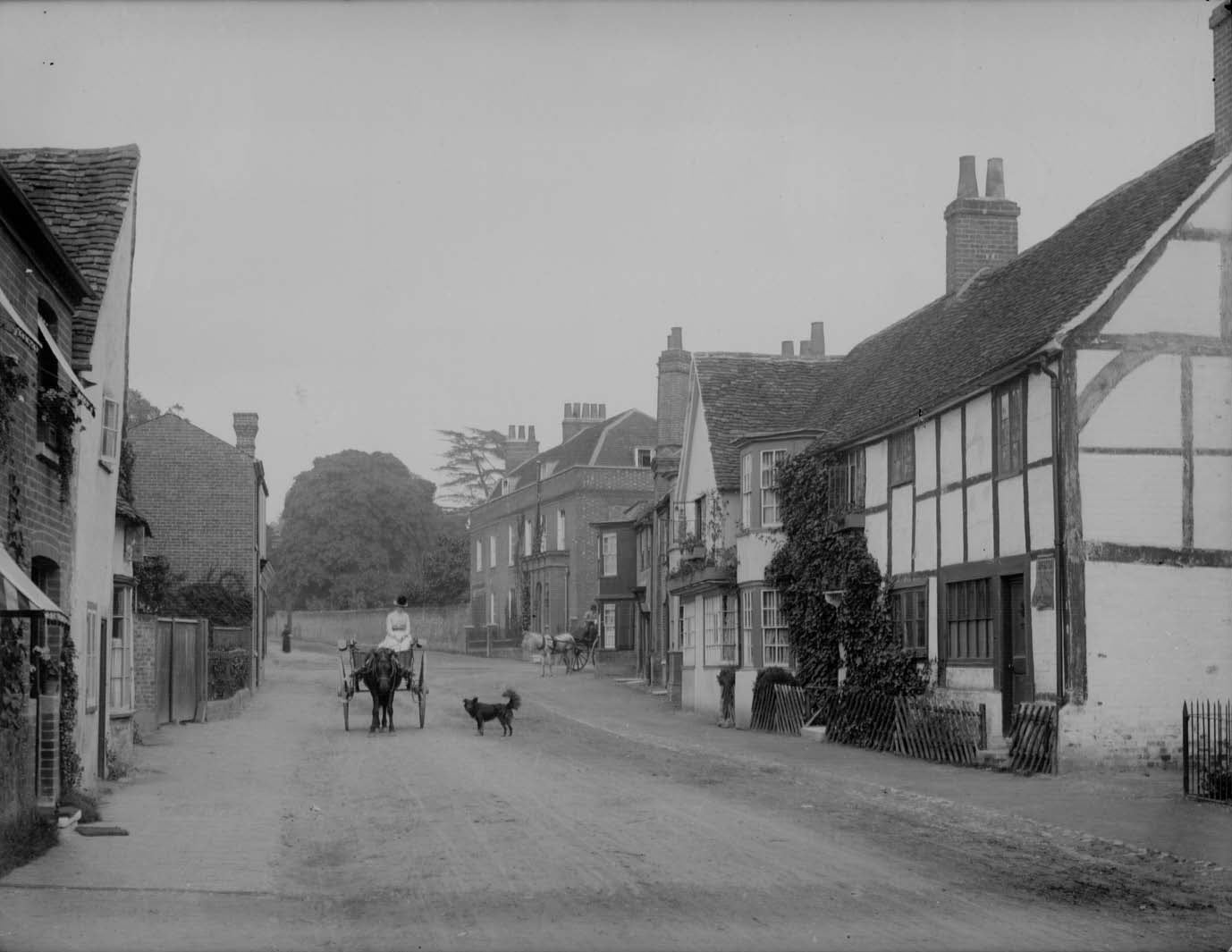
Church Street, c. 1888 by Henry Taunt

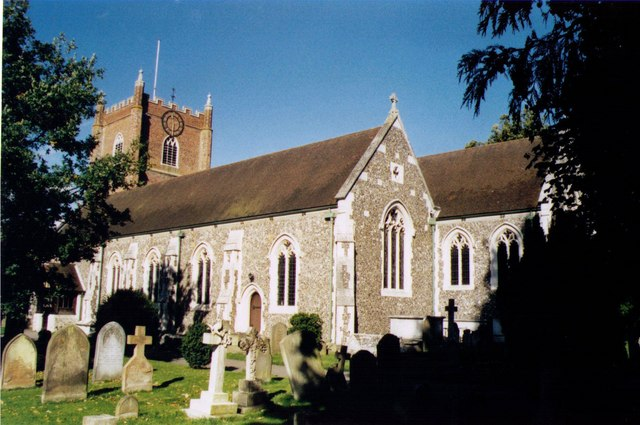
St Mary's parish church

The first documentary evidence of the settlement was recorded in 1061 which indicates that it was a village and had a manor in the feudal system. The Domesday Book of 1086 records the settlement as having a population of 250. In the 13th century the current High Street was lined with plots and backstreets developed.

Wargrave Court was erected in the early Tudor period and then altered and extended in the Georgian to post-Edwardian period. Wargrave Manor occupies its medieval site on the northern outskirts, bounded by its lower meadow that overlooks Wargrave Marsh below it, which is drained farmland downstream and the local primary floodplain. However this building, while also grade II listed, is larger, with a modest landscaped park. It is late Georgian and altered later in a painted stucco with moulded, chamfered quoins, moulding over second floor windows, hipped slate roof with several chimneys, spread over three storeys save for the wings. The east front has a conical roof over a protrusion of a similar shape with three sash windows flanked by a single bays with similar windows: all windows have architrave surrounds, with the ground floor windows having Victorian panes. This section has a Doric veranda with coupled columns supporting entablature across the whole front. Flanking wings have two upper sash windows and venetian windows on their ground floor. Its Victorian south front has 5 bays repeating the design and a central porch of angle pilasters supporting entablature and blocking course. Above the double door is a radiating fanlight. The west front has a large Victorian semi-circular terrace in front.

The village continued to develop into its current form in the 18th century growing up the hill from the High Street eastwards so that by the end of the 19th century this axis, now Victoria Road, was fully settled.

=== Post Industrial Revolution ===
In the 20th century the village's population grew significantly, especially in the 1970s and 1980s as new developments on farmland inside the parish boundaries responded to demand for housing for commuters working in and on the increasingly commercial western outskirts of London. Wargrave War Memorial was commissioned in the aftermath of the First World War. Taking the shape of a hexagonal cross on the village green, it was designed by Sir Edwin Lutyens and unveiled on 28 May 1922. It is a grade II listed building.

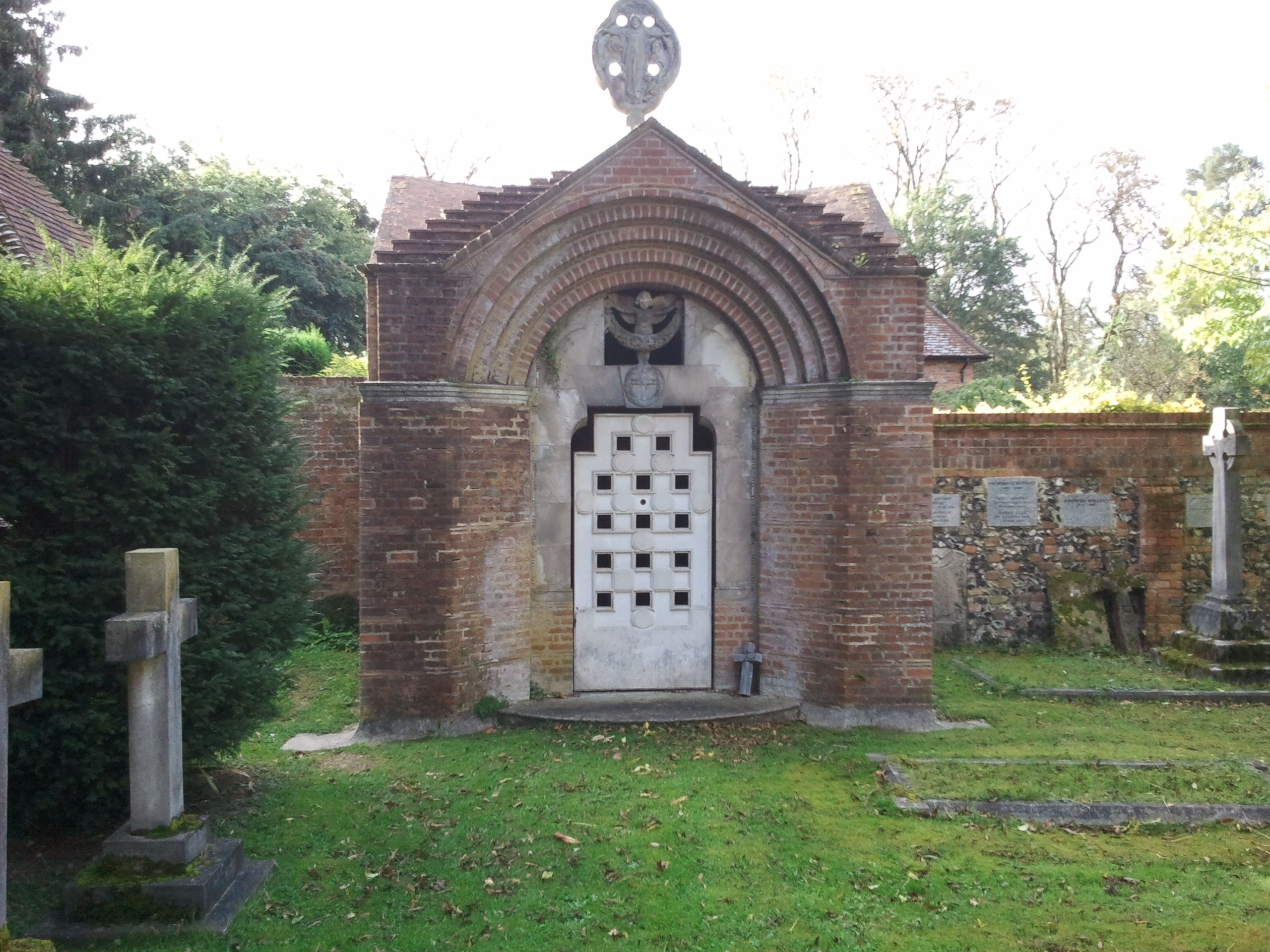
The Hannen Columbarium

== Geography ==
The village encloses in its west the confluence of the River Loddon and the River Thames. It is on the A321 north–south road between Twyford and Henley-on-Thames. On the opposite bank of the River Thames are the villages of Shiplake and Lower Shiplake. When taken as its civil parish, such as in all of its history and in civil parish council provision of footpath maintenance and annual village events, it includes Hare Hatch and Cockpole Green. These largest hamlets rely on Wargrave's businesses (such as post office, shops, hairdressing and other usual large village services) and for education.

Wargrave railway station is on the Henley Branch Line between Twyford (the next station south) and Henley-on-Thames. The railway operator provides trains at least every 30 minutes each way on Monday-Friday and allows connections to Reading and London Paddington. If a change of train is made at Twyford, the time to the capital is 53–70 minutes. A large proportion of the residents in employment commute to outlying areas, as the village itself supports a small range of shops and businesses, but the average commute is more than five miles to support the local economy as at the 2011 census.

== Governance ==
Wargrave has its own parish council, and is also in the Borough of Wokingham, and the ceremonial county of Berkshire. It was in the parliamentary constituency of Maidenhead, but constituency changes have moved it into Wokingham.

== Christian buildings and memorials ==
The Church of England parish church of Saint Mary dates from the 12th century and has the wide ecclesiastical parish of Wargrave with Knowl Hill. It is situated on Mill Green, off the High Street. In 1914 it was set on fire and gutted as a result of direct action by the Suffragette Movement. The north door remains from the 12th century, the tower from 1635 and the remaining structure was built following the fire. This is a Grade II* listed building.

In the gardens of the churchyard is the Hannen Columbarium, a columbarium built to house the remains of the Hannen family. It was designed by Edwin Lutyens and is considered an interesting example of his early work. The ashes of Sir Nicholas John Hannen, judge, his son, Nicholas "Beau" Hannen, actor, and Beau's wife Athene Seyler, also an actor, are all interred in the columbarium. Thomas Day (1748–1789), author and abolitionist, is also buried in the churchyard, after being fatally thrown from his horse. The Roman Catholic church of Our Lady of Peace was built in 1963 and is supported by the Parish of Saint Thomas More of the neighbouring village, Twyford.

== The river ==
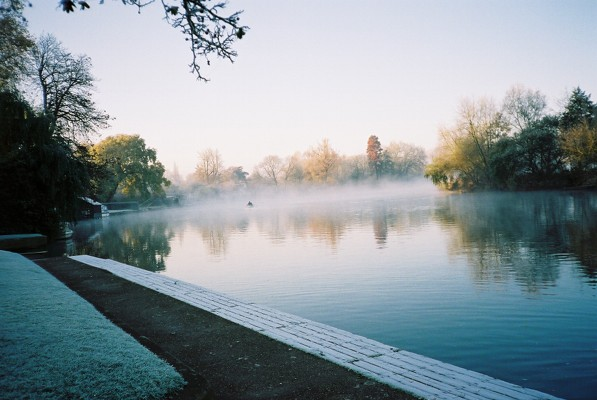
River Thames in Wargrave

There are marinas and Wargrave Boating Club for those who use the River Thames for leisure and sport. In August, the Wargrave & Shiplake Regatta is held over two days on the Shiplake riverbank opposite. The regatta combines serious and light-hearted racing in canoes, dinghies, dongolas and skiffs. It is the largest community event of the year having taken place since 1867. The event ends with a large firework display on the Saturday night.

Wargrave is mentioned in Jerome K. Jerome's, 1889 book Three Men in a Boat, a humorous account of a boating holiday on the River Thames:

We caught a breeze, after lunch, which took us gently up past Wargrave and Shiplake. Mellowed in the drowsy sunlight of a summer's afternoon, Wargrave, nestling where the river bends, makes a sweet old picture as you pass it, and one that lingers long upon the retina of memory. The “George and Dragon" at Wargrave boasts a sign, painted on the one side by Leslie, R.A., and on the other by Hodgson of that ilk. Leslie has depicted the fight; Hodgson has imagined the scene, "After the Fight"— George, the work done, enjoying his pint of beer. Day, the author of Sandford and Merton, lived and—more credit to the place still—was killed at Wargrave.

— Jerome K. Jerome, Three Men in a Boat, Chapter XIV

== Amenities ==
At one time there were seven public houses on High Street, serving the stage coaches travelling between Henley-on-Thames and Reading; there are now only two. The pubs remaining today are the Bull and the St George and Dragon. The Queen Victoria public house in Hare Hatch recently closed and is being redeveloped into housing. Wargrave has its own primary school, which is split into the infant school and junior school, and a secondary academy school – The Piggott School formerly a comprehensive school, now an academy. Each is a Church of England voluntary controlled school and are also feeder schools to each other. They are all named after Robert Piggott.

== Demography ==
Wargrave is recorded since at least the Norman Conquest as covering the land right up to the crest of the hills to the east, (but only in terms of the civil parish since the building of chapels of ease in the outlying parts after the 19th century secular/religious split). At the level of local government above this, the Wargrave ward is redrawn typically every 12 years to roughly even out the population between such wards. It covers a similar area. As is common across the United Kingdom, the RG10 postcode of the mid-county-covering Reading post town is for postal convenience and bears a slight relation to the largest administrative border as currently drawn. Key statistics from both administrative areas are shown in the table below together with the nucleus of Wargrave twin census Lower Level Super Output Areas which omits a few communities of Wargrave which are isolated by buffering fields and woodlands.

2011 Census key statistics
Output area	Population	Homes	% Owned outright	% Owned with a loan	km^{2}	km^{2} Greenspace (Note: Comprises cultivated fields, pasture, woodland, public parks and a little marshland at the confluence of the River Loddon.)	km^{2} gardens	km^{2} road and rail
Wargrave (civil parish)	3,803	1,570	41.2%	35.8%	16.28	13.76	1.45	0.41
Wargrave (Wokingham 001B and 1C)	3,025	1,234	41.2%	37.3%	6.41	4.84	0.82	0.23
Remenham, Wargrave and Ruscombe (ward)	5,421	2,272	41.6%	34.1%	30.12	26.42	2.02	0.73

== Notable residents ==
- Richard Aldworth (c.1614–1680), MP for Reading, was born in Wargrave
- Dave Allen, comedian
- Arthur Austen-Leigh, vicar and cricketer, was local Rector from 1890 to 1911
- Angela Baddeley, actress, lived in Wargrave prior to her death in 1976
- Richard Barry, 7th Earl of Barrymore
- Raymond Baxter, television presenter
- Bert Bushnell, athlete 1948 Olympic Gold medalist at double sculls
- Paul Daniels and Debbie McGee, magician and his wife/assistant
- Peter Davison, actor and Sandra Dickinson, actress, lived in Wargrave whilst married
- Nicholas "Beau" Hannen, actor (son of Sir Nicholas Hannen)
- Sir Nicholas John Hannen, Chief Justice of the British Supreme Court for China and Japan
- Mary Hopkin, singer
- Sir Morell Mackenzie, physician and surgeon
- Robert Morley, actor
- Bobby Whitlock, American singer, songwriter and musician
- Mazoon bint Ahmad, Consort of the Sultan of Muscat and Oman, frequently stayed at Wargrave Manor, owned by her son Qaboos bin Said

== Sources ==
- Gray, R. and Griffiths, S. (eds) (1986), The Book of Wargrave, Wargrave: Wargrave Local History Society, ISBN 0 9511878 05
