= Shiplake railway station =

Railway station in Oxfordshire, England

Shiplake
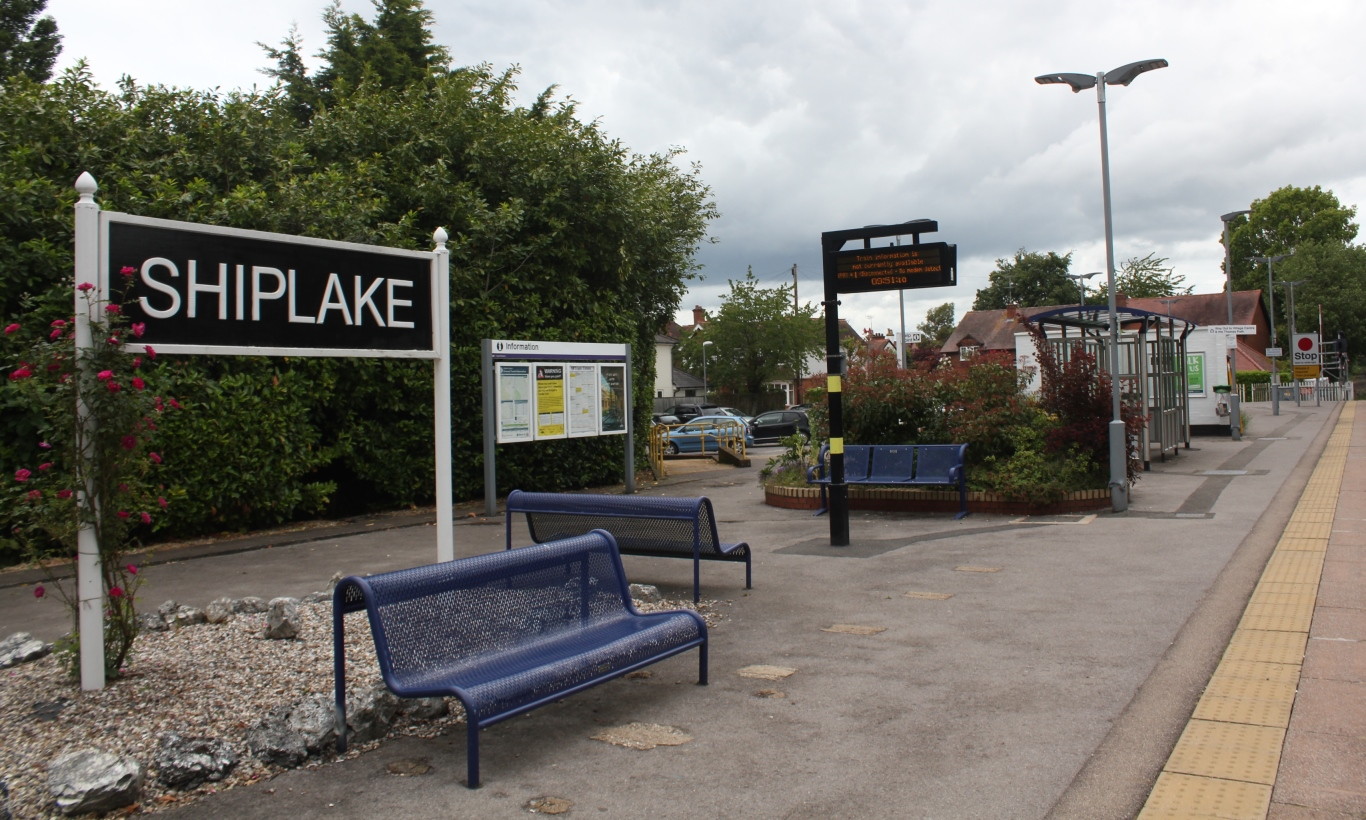

General information
- Location: Shiplake, South Oxfordshire; England
- Coordinates: 51.511°N 0.883°W
- Grid reference: SU776797
- Managed by: Great Western Railway
- Platforms: 1 (+1 disused)

Other information
- Station code: SHI
- Classification: DfT category F2

History
- Opened: 1 June 1857
- Original company: Great Western Railway
- Pre-grouping: Great Western Railway
- Post-grouping: Great Western Railway

Key dates
- 1 June 1857: Twyford to Henley-on-Thames branch opened
- 1 June 1857: Station opened

Passengers
- 2020/21: ▼15,028
- 2021/22: ▲47,360
- 2022/23: ▲78,466
- 2023/24: ▲104,900
- 2024/25: ▲128,782
Location
Notes
- Passenger statistics from the Office of Rail and Road

Shiplake railway station is in the village of Lower Shiplake (formerly Lashbrook) in Oxfordshire, England. The station is on the Henley-on-Thames branch line that links the towns of Henley-on-Thames and Twyford. It is 2 miles 60 chains (4.4 km) down the line from Twyford and 33 miles 61 chains (54.3 km) from London Paddington.

It is served by local trains operated by Great Western Railway.

The station has a single platform, which is used by trains in both directions. There is a 50-space car park, but no station building other than a simple shelter. The station is unstaffed and tickets must be purchased on the train or on-line.

== History ==
The station was built in the village of Lashbrook in 1857, but named for the main village of Shiplake. The village of Shiplake, with the parish church and grand manor houses of Shiplake Court and Shiplake House, is actually over a mile away to the south of Shiplake station. Victorian developers and their commuting commercial customers then chose to build new houses close to the station; the hamlet of Lashbrook grew rapidly and eventually changed its name to Lower Shiplake in the early twentieth century.

In June 1914, it is said suffragettes were intending to burn Shiplake Church but, on realising it was such a distance from the station of the same name, burned Wargrave Church down instead. A camping coach was positioned here by the Western Region from 1956 to 1963.

== Service ==
In normal service, there is a regular service between Henley-on-Thames station and Twyford station, with all trains calling at Shiplake station. Passengers for Paddington and Reading must change at Twyford. Trains operate twice an hour during the day, with less frequent services in the early morning and late evenings. Trains run to the same basic frequency seven days a week, but start and finish times for the service differ by day of the week.

During the Henley Royal Regatta, held every July, a special timetable is operated with additional trains. During the period of the regatta, not all trains stop at Shiplake station.

The platform can hold 7 coaches.

Preceding station	National Rail	Following station
Wargrave	Great Western Railway Henley Branch Line	Henley-on-Thames

== Level crossing ==
There is a level crossing north of the station that, despite being well signalled, has been the site of numerous accidents and near misses over the years. The crossing had no barriers until March 2013, when Network Rail had automatic half-barriers installed.

In October 2014, safety cameras described by locals as 'looking like robots' were controversially installed to monitor the crossing.
