= Bowsey Hill =

Hill in Berkshire, England

Coordinates: 51.51°N 00.84°W

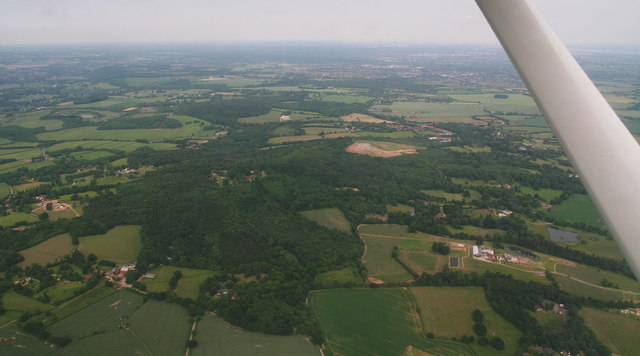
- Bowsey Hill bordering Knowl Hill and Star Works sand pit

- Location within Berkshire
- OS grid reference: SU8080
- Shire county: Berkshire
- Region: South East
- Country: England
- Sovereign state: United Kingdom
- Police: Thames Valley
- Fire: Royal Berkshire
- Ambulance: South Central

Bowsey Hill is a hill in Berkshire, England. It is situated in the civil parish of Wargrave in the unitary authority of Wokingham Borough. Rising to a height of 142 metres (466 ft), it has some five or six houses on its summit and has a topographic prominence of 55 metres (180 ft).

== Geography ==
=== Biodiversity ===
The area is known for its extensive woodlands, which include significant areas of ancient woodland. Ashley Hill Forest has been largely replanted with a mix of conifers and broadleaves. In contrast, the woodland on Bowsey Hill is more semi-natural in character and includes notable stands of beech woodland. An area of parkland is located at Cayton Park on the western side of the hills.

=== Geology ===
The hills rise from a base of chalk. The upper slopes are primarily composed of London Clay Formation, which consists of clay, silt, and sand. In some areas, this is topped by layers of Head and sand and gravel of uncertain origin. The lower slopes feature Reading Beds (Lambeth Group), while chalk outcrops are present at the northern edge.

==== Geodiversity ====
The hills are of significant geological interest. At Knowl Hill, there is an old quarry and brickworks site that provides important geological exposures. Similar geological features are also found at Knowl Hill Common. Additionally, several gravel pit sites on both hills offer further geodiversity interest.

== Conservation ==
Conservation efforts and future opportunities for Ashley and Bowsey Hills include the management of woodlands, with a focus on restoring replanted ancient woodland sites. The management of parkland areas and the protection of important geological exposures are also key conservation targets.
