= Shiplake Railway Bridge =

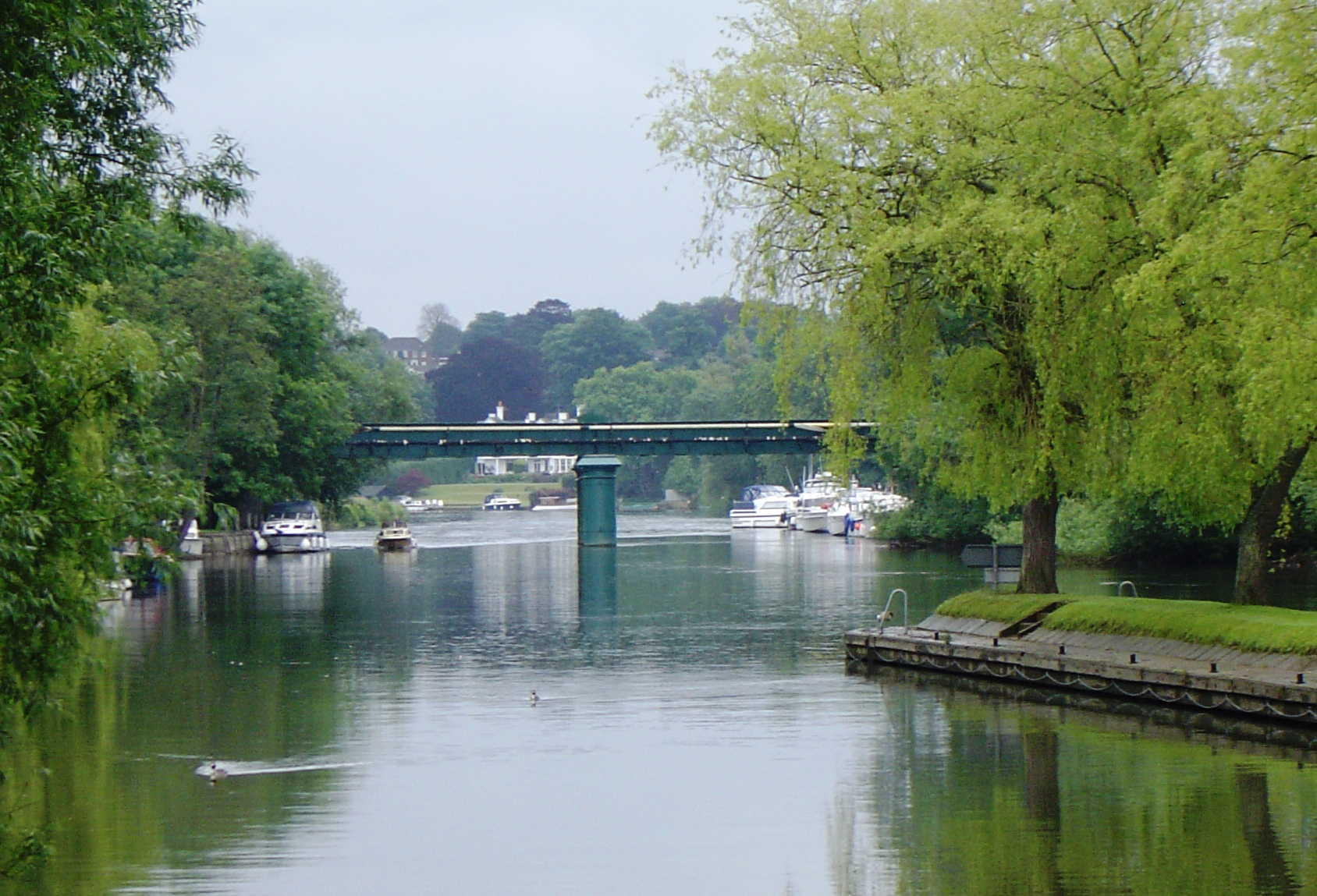
- Hen Viaduct
- Coordinates: 51°30′07″N 0°52′41″W
- Carries: Henley Regatta Branch Line
- Crosses: River Thames
- Locale: Shiplake, Oxfordshire
- Maintained by: Network Rail

Characteristics
- Design: Girder
- Material: Iron
- Height: 17 feet 10 inches (5.44 m)

History
- Opened: 1897

Shiplake Railway Bridge carries the Henley Branch Line to Henley-on-Thames, England across the River Thames, connecting Shiplake in Oxfordshire with Wargrave in Berkshire. It crosses the river just downstream of Shiplake Lock on the reach above Marsh Lock.

== History and construction ==
The current bridge was built in 1897. It consists of wrought-iron plate girders supported by cast-iron cylinders filled with concrete. It replaces an earlier timber bridge built in 1857. There were originally two tracks, but the whole line is now single track only; the cylinders which supported the second track still stand today.

== The 'Millennium Bridge' that never was ==
In the late 1990s the bridge was the focus of controversy spanning several years after local politicians sought funding from the Millennium Commission to transform it into the 'Millennium Bridge'. The intention was to create a major local tourist attraction by using the supports for the redundant track as the basis for a secondary bridge which would connect walkers' leisure routes and link to a new section of the National Cycle Network.

The proposals split the opinions of the residents of the two villages the bridge was to join. Many in Wargrave saw the advantages of an easy crossing to Shiplake, whilst there were many in Shiplake who were concerned the riverbank was going to be overrun with visitors' cars. Residents in Shiplake formed the Shiplake Bridge Concern Group which for several years ran a campaign to get the plans modified. When the plans, which had only been changed in minor ways, were finally put before the South Oxfordshire District Council an all-time record number of objections was received.

Although planning permission for the 'Millennium Bridge' was ultimately granted after several re-submissions, the delays created by those campaigning against it resulted in the project being abandoned on cost grounds: it had been costed in the mid-90s when the building industry was in recession, but by the time the go-ahead was given the economy was booming again and the projected costs had doubled.

== See also ==
- Crossings of the River Thames

Next crossing upstream	River Thames	Next crossing downstream
Sonning Bridge (road) & Sonning Backwater Bridges	Shiplake Railway Bridge	Henley Bridge (road)
