= Henley branch line =

Railway line between Twyford and Henley-on-Thames, England

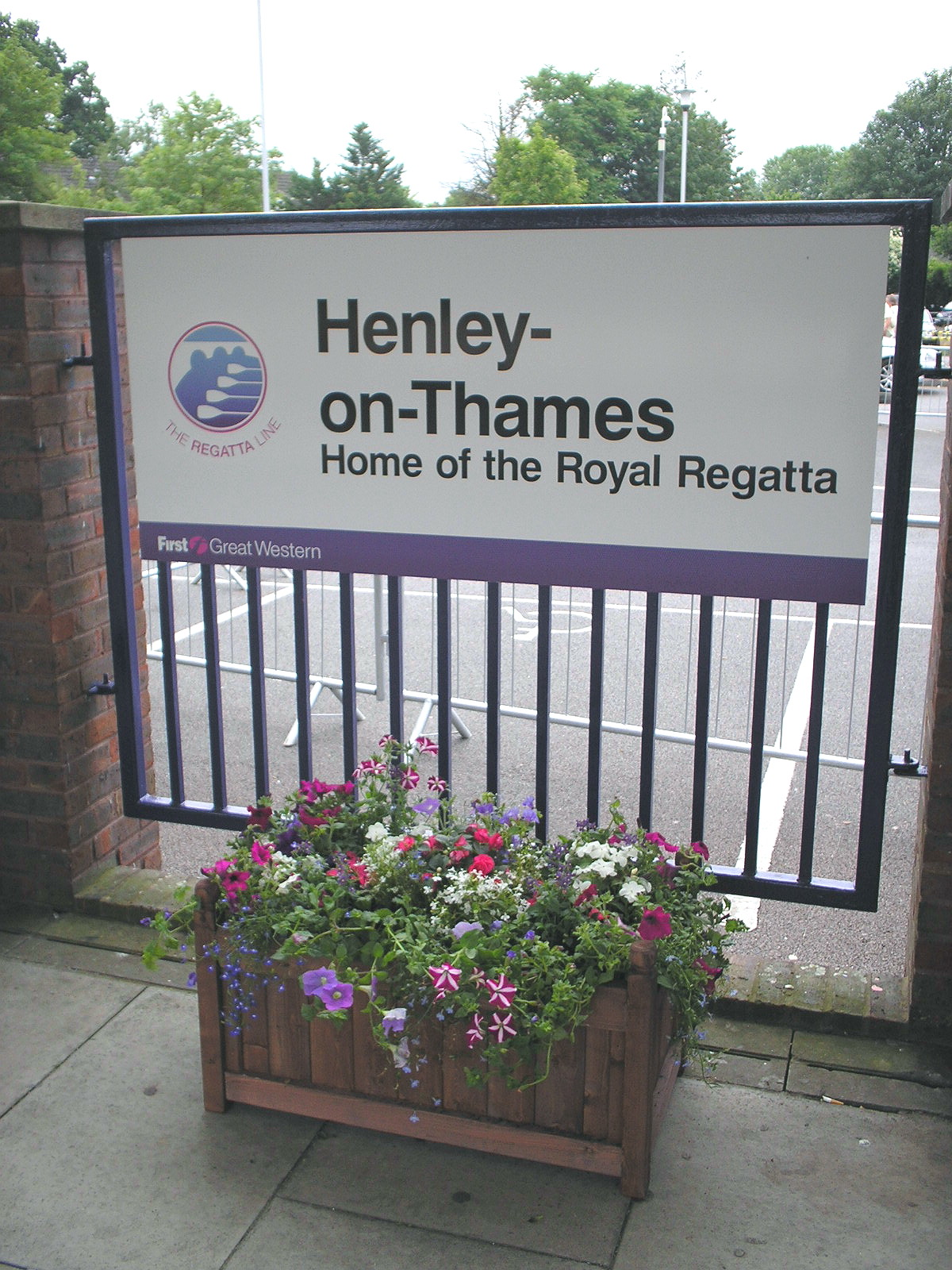
- A sign at Henley-on-Thames showing the Regatta Line name

Overview
- Status: Operational
- Owner: Network Rail
- Locale: Berkshire; Oxfordshire; South East England
- Termini: Twyford; Henley-on-Thames
- Stations: 4

Service
- Type: Heavy rail
- System: National Rail
- Operator(s): Great Western Railway
- Rolling stock: Class 165 "Turbo"; Class 166 "Turbo Express"

History
- Opened: 1857

Technical
- Number of tracks: Single track
- Track gauge: 1,435 mm (4 ft 8 1/2 in) standard gauge
- Old gauge: 7 ft (2,134 mm)
- Operating speed: 50 mph (80 km/h)
Route map
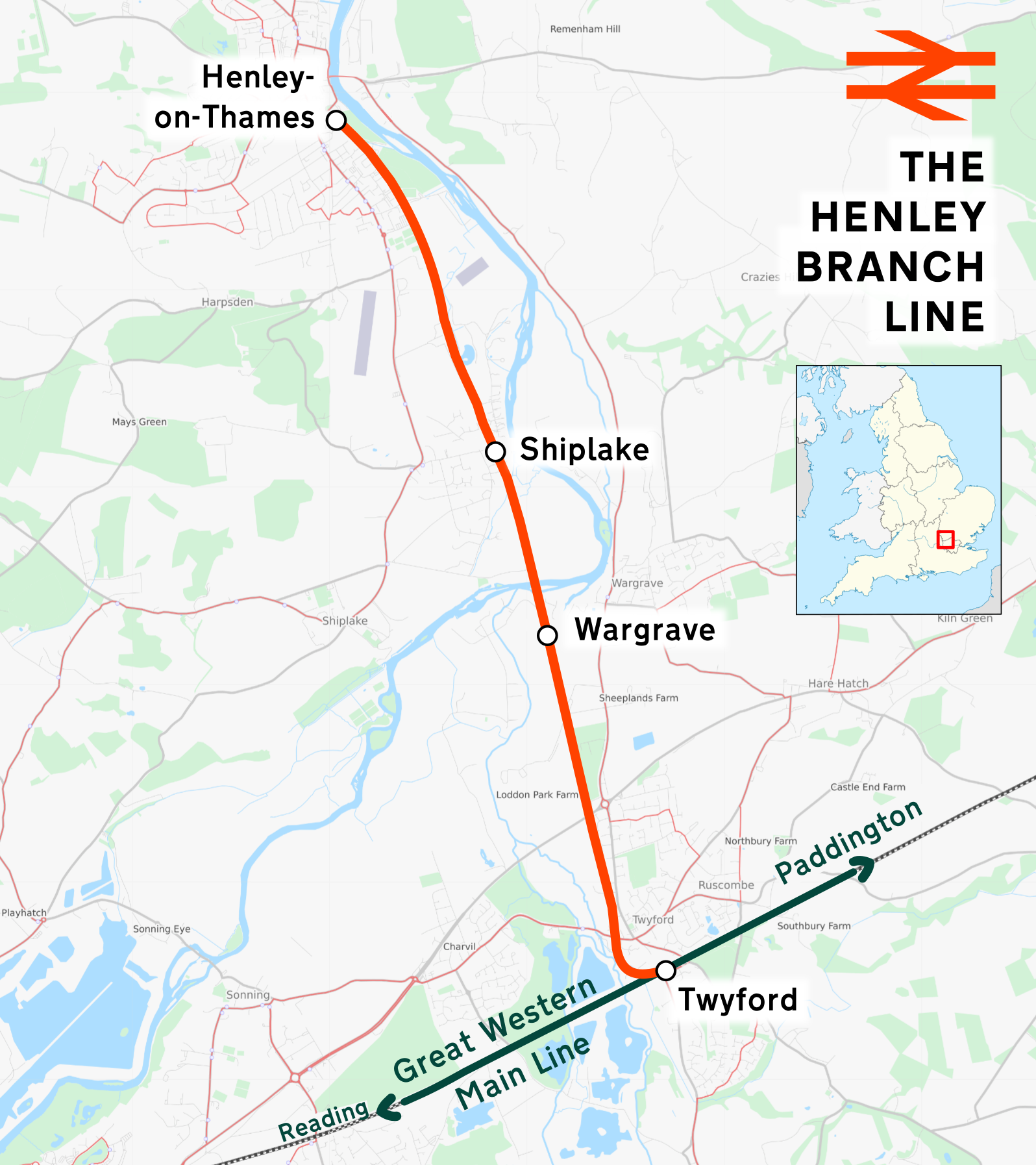
(Click to expand)

The Henley branch line is a branch railway line between Twyford in Berkshire and Henley-on-Thames in Oxfordshire. It was built by the Great Western Railway in 1857. Train services are provided by the present day Great Western Railway train operating company.

The railway provides access to the River Thames and the Thames Path and is heavily used during the Henley Royal Regatta. It is sometimes referred to as the Regatta Line, and was branded as such by First Great Western and Oxfordshire County Council in 2006.

At periods other than the Regatta, many of the line's users are commuters to London, and students attending the nearby Henley College.

== Route ==
From a junction with the Great Western Main Line at Twyford railway station, the line turns north and goes under the A4 main road; the first station is at Wargrave. From there, the line crosses the River Thames into Oxfordshire and proceeds to Shiplake, the second stop on the line. Finally it continues to the town of Henley-on-Thames, where the line terminates.

The speed limit is 50 mph (80 km/h) along most of line, except for the Shiplake bridge, which is 30 mph (48 km/h) for multiple units (10 mph (16 km/h) for any other type of train), and the approach to Twyford, which is 25 mph (40 km/h).

== Electrification ==
This line is 4 1/2 miles (7.2 km) long and is not currently electrified. Electrification of the branch was announced in July 2012 and was started in April 2015; as of that time, markings have been placed next to the track where the overhead wire masts are to go and a significant number of trees have been trimmed or removed; re-signalling was also carried out during this time. This is in conjunction with the electrification of the Great Western Main Line.

It was announced on 8 November 2016 that the electrification of the branch was being delayed, without a revised forecast date.

== Train services ==
The current (2022) passenger train service pattern on the line provides trains at about 30 minute intervals off peak. The first train out from Henley is at 06:05 and the last train back at 00:18. The Saturday service is also half-hourly until around 20:15, after which a largely hourly service is operated. This is also the case with the Sunday service, with half-hourly services until 19:15.

Additional services are provided during Henley Regatta at the beginning of July, with longer trains. All services are operated by Great Western Railway (GWR), using Class 165 and 166 Turbo diesel multiple units. Upon completion of electrification, Class 387 trains will be used, while the Turbos will be displaced to other parts of the GWR network.

== History ==
Henley had long flourished due to its location on the River Thames, and the road bridge there which formed a focus of road traffic. By the seventeenth century it was an established coaching stop, and it was only in the railway age that the dominance of the town was brought into question.

=== First proposals ===
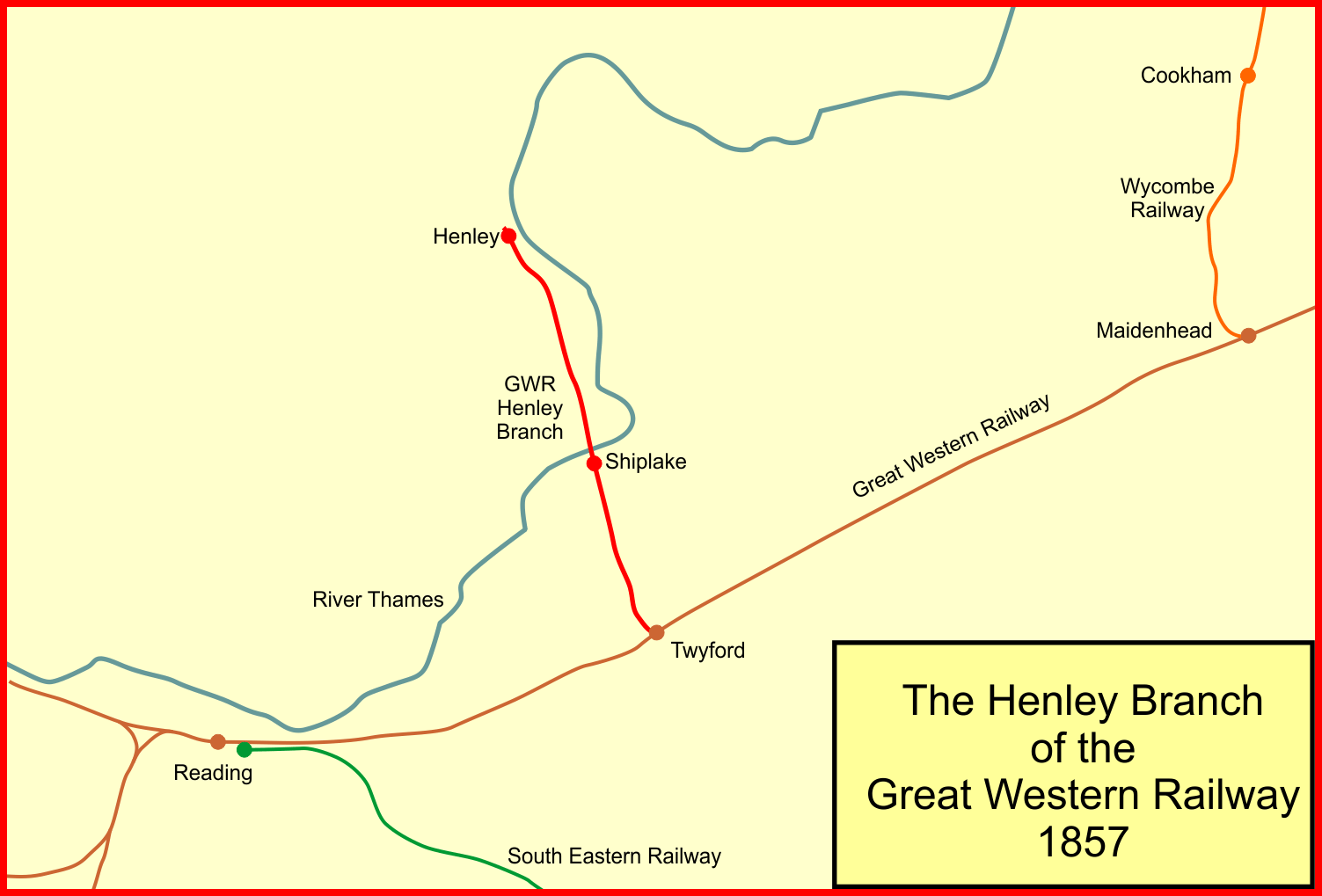
The Henley branch railway in 1857

The Great Western Railway opened its main line as far as a temporary wooden terminus at Twyford on 1 July 1839, extending to Reading on 30 March 1840. Twyford was the nearest station to Henley, but customary transport routes using the River Thames continued in use for the time being. Meanwhile a number of railway schemes to connect the town were put forward, but the most realistic was from the Great Western Railway itself, and after a rejection in the 1846 session of Parliament, a Bill for the branch line was passed on 22 July 1847. (Note: From Karau, page 1; Mitchell and Smith say 27 July 1847.)

It is likely that the Great Western Railway proposed the branch line as a tactical measure to exclude proposed railways from what was their intended exclusive area of influence. The financial situation became very difficult in the following years with money difficult to raise, lessening GWR's desire to build the line. In 1852 the possibility of incursion by competing companies was again in evidence and the powers for construction were due to expire in 1854, so the GWR made application for an extension of time.

Interested parties in Henley were growing impatient at the lack of progress toward connecting their town to the railway network, and a meeting was held on 28 October 1852, chaired by the Mayor of Henley, at which it was urged that the railway should be built without delay. A deputation went to Paddington to press the matter with the Chairman of the GWR, and the outcome of that meeting was that the GWR agreed to build the line if the townspeople themselves contributed £15,000; if they did so the line would be built and 3% on their subscriptions would be guaranteed by the GWR.

A subscription list was opened and about half the required subscription was taken; but the local people also requested a change in the planned course of the line to run on a more westerly alignment, to enable a direct approach to the Market Place. This risked delay while the line was resurveyed, and time was already tight to achieve deposition of a Bill in the 1853 session. Accordingly it was agreed that the originally intended route should be held to. (The deposited plans showed the termination of the line as being at Friday Street, but in fact the line ended some distance south of that place.)

=== The railway authorised ===
The bill for time extension was presented to Parliament and it received the royal assent as the Great Western Railway Branches Act 1853 (16 & 17 Vict. c. cliii) on 4 August 1853; it included powers to raise additional capital. The line was to be a single line, although bridges and earthworks were to be constructed for later doubling. (This was not actually done.) The track gauge was to be the broad gauge, consistent with the main line at Twyford.

Colonel Yolland of the Board of Trade carried out the necessary inspection for approval for opening, on 25 May 1857. The condition of the line was good, except that the station buildings were incomplete and a turntable was still to be finished, and Yolland recommended that approval for opening be given, subject to the use of tank engines in the absence of the turntable, and the adoption of one engine in steam working, There was a separate bay platform for branch trains at Twyford, approached by a sharp curve; there was one intermediate station at Shiplake.

=== Opening ===
The line opened to the public on Monday 1 June 1857. It had cost £79,000 to build (a considerable overspend), and the local people had only subscribed £9,575. The first train was hauled by a 2-4-0T engine named Virgo.

The initial timetable allowed for five return trains daily.

By 1858 the public timetable showed seven weekday and three Sunday passenger trains each way, and by 1868 the service timetable showed seven passenger trains and a goods trains every weekday, and on Sundays four passenger trains each way.

=== Wooden structures ===
There were three timber viaducts on the line: the most important was the Thames crossing between Wargrave and Shiplake; it was constructed of three main spans of 40 feet using A-frames by which the clearance beneath the truss is maximised. There were 16 approach spans between 25 ft 6 in (7.8 m) and 32 ft (9.8 m) span. It was replaced by a masonry and iron structure between 1895 and 1898.

Lashbrook Viaduct was 270 feet (82 m) in length; it was replaced at the same time as the Thames bridge. Wargrave flood arches consisted of seven 10 ft (3 m) spans; also replaced between 1895 and 1898; it was then constructed with three brick spans and from that time became known as Wargrave viaduct.

There was also a timber overbridge on the line at Wargrave Lane, rebuilt in 1894.

=== Gauge conversion ===
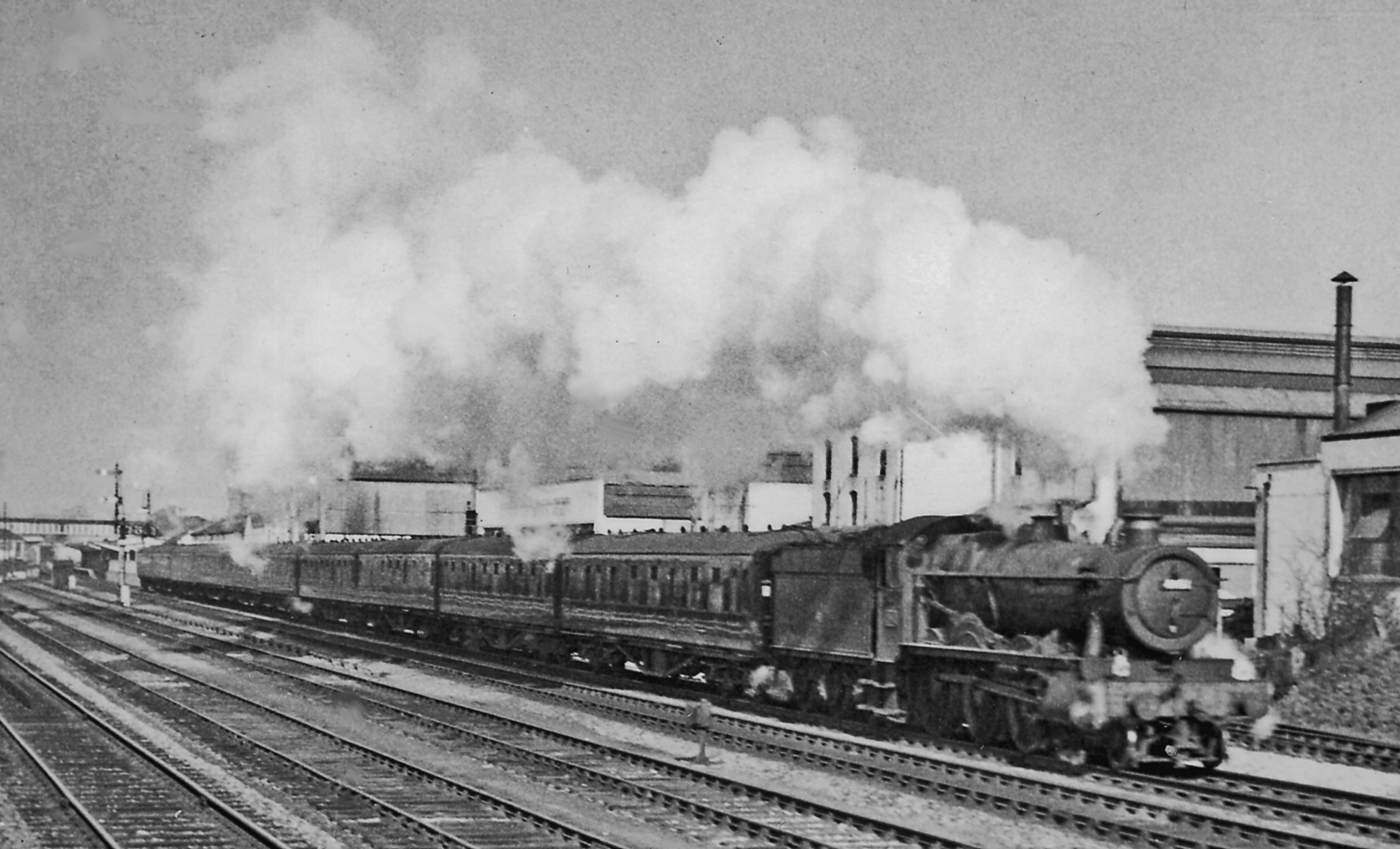
Henley–Paddington train at Slough

It was becoming plain that the broad gauge was to be changed to the use of narrow gauge, later called standard gauge. The gauge conversion was carried out in a single night, on 24 and 25 March 1876.

An engineer involved in the gauge conversion wrote about it:

I found myself at nine o'clock one evening in the company of two permanent way inspectors in a packer's hut midway between Twyford and Henley. The slopes of the railway were covered with men, but all one could hear was the distant sound of an engine shunting in Henley station yard. At length there came a whistle and we could hear the approaching train, followed by a kind of roar which developed into, "Now, all together, over," with a grunt like a miner's, when he brings his sledge down on the drill. Directly the train had passed, every one was alive. Each inspector had four gangs of five and twenty men in his mile. Two of the twenty five went ahead knocking out the fastening, two pairs followed cutting the transoms which had already been marked, and two more followed the main gang refixing the bolts and straps. By midnight the line on our two miles had been slewed in from 7 feet 0 1/4 inches to the 4 feet 8 1/2 inches gauge, and we retired to our hut to feed and, as we hoped, to sleep. But not so; one of the inspectors, being of the opinion that if we did not keep awake we should catch cold, threw a fog signal into the fire and we promptly moved out. I then walked towards Twyford, where progress had been slower, as the line was curved and the rails had to be cut in many places. At 4 a.m. we were about again, but there was not sufficient light for an hour to lift and pack the rails, though we managed to get a train through by eight o' clock.

=== Development at Henley ===
In this period Henley was gaining increasing ascendancy as a favourite leisure resort, and also as a residential area. This brought considerable traffic, and began to pose operating difficulties for the railway. In 1881 the platforms at Henley were extended in length, and additional siding accommodation was provided.

=== 1890s events ===
The timber buildings of Shiplake station were destroyed in a disastrous fire on 26 August 1891.

The main line in the area had become seriously congested, and an additional two tracks were installed, on the south side of the line. This "quadrupling" was opened for goods trains in November 1892 and for passenger trains on 30 April 1893.

In 1894 Henley-in-Arden station (in Warwickshire) was opened, and to avoid confusion, Henley station was renamed Henley-on-Thames from 1 January 1895.

There had been some difficulties with the undulating gradient on the line as originally constructed, and in 1895 works were carried out between Twyford and Shiplake to improve matters. In the same year further work was carried out at Henley-on-Thames providing further siding accommodation and extending the platforms, responding to the very considerable increase in patronage as Henley town developed as a Thames resort

In July 1896 the decision was taken to double the line, at an estimated cost of £21,275; as part of the work Shiplake station was provided with an island platform. The works were inspected by Colonel York of the Board of Trade on 12 July 1897 and opened as a double line on 14 July 1897, just in time for the regatta. In fact the double track consisted of a new single line and the old single line. After the regatta, the original single line was taken out of use and the operation on the branch reverted temporarily to single-line working on the new track, while the old single line was modernised. The work was finally completed on 11 July 1898.

=== Train services at the end of the nineteenth century ===
In 1898 a writer described the new train services at Henley:

Since May 1st of this year, Henley, until lately on a single-line branch, seems almost to be on a short main line of its own, since no less than seven down trains from London (all fast or semi-fast) now make it their terminal point, with no shunting or delay at Twyford; four up trains, all fast, start from Henley for Paddington. The best of these in each direction is, of course, the new direct express, with no intermediate stop, which now runs seven days a week.

There was a down non-stop train leaving Paddington at 10:00 am weekdays, 10:05 am on Sundays, and making the journey in 50 minutes; in the up direction it left Henley at 9:15 pm weekdays, 9:00 pm on Sundays, and with a stop at Westbourne Park made the journey in 52 minutes.

Besides this excellent express and the through trains above-named, through coaches are worked from Paddington on two other trains daily, and also (by a "slip" at Twyford) on Wednesday nights only, by the 12.10 midnight. The 8.50 a.m. up branch train from Henley, which meets a direct fast to Paddington at Twyford, also works through vehicles to London. In the opposite direction there is a through train from Reading at 10.13 a.m., in connection with expresses from Wolverhampton (slip at 9.43) and Cheltenham (slip at 9.56), returning from Henley at 5.55 p.m., "reversing", of course, at Twyford.

=== The twentieth century ===
From 1900 there were further new direct expresses non-stop to and from Paddington in 50 minutes; by 1902 there were five through trains from Paddington, one of them slipped at Twyford. About 20 trains a day ran each way on the branch for most of the twentieth century.

A new station at Wargrave opened on 1 October 1900 with two 500-foot (150 m) platforms; a new road from the station site to the village had to be built.

The old 45-foot (14 m) turntable at Henley was proving inadequate as engine dimensions increased, and a new 55-foot (17 m) turntable was brought into use in 1903.

The station canopies at Henley had been 100 feet (30 m) in length, but in 1904 another 200 feet (61 m) were added to those on the Up platform.

=== ATC trials ===
The Great Western Railway developed a system referred to as Automatic train control (ATC). In its developed form it gave drivers an audible and visual indication in the cab of the aspect of a distant signal as it was approached or passed. If a warning was given and not acknowledged by the driver, the train brakes would be applied. Track equipment near the distant signals operated detection equipment on the locomotive.

The prototype system was trialled on the Henley branch at the end of 1905. The system was found to be successful, and in due course it was implemented all over the GWR system.

=== Train services ===
In 1910 there had been twenty passenger trains each way every weekday on the line, and seven on Sundays. By 1922 this had been increased to 34 down and 30 up with 14 and 15 respectively on Sundays.

A railmotor service from Reading was introduced in 1914, and later this was changed to an auto-trailer with an 0-4-2T locomotive. The through trains to London were generally worked by main line tender engines, in later years of the Hall or Castle class.

The first AEC diesel railcar of the GWR operated some trips on the line on or after 5 February 1934.

=== From 1948 ===
The railways of Great Britain were taken into national ownership in 1948; the former GWR lines were now part of British Railways.

There was a water tower at Henley to provide steam engine water, and for many years it had been powered by steam from a locomotive given that duty. In 1950 an electric pump system was installed, but on regatta days a steam engine was stationed there to pump water as the many visiting engines all requiring water overwhelmed the capacity of the electric pump.

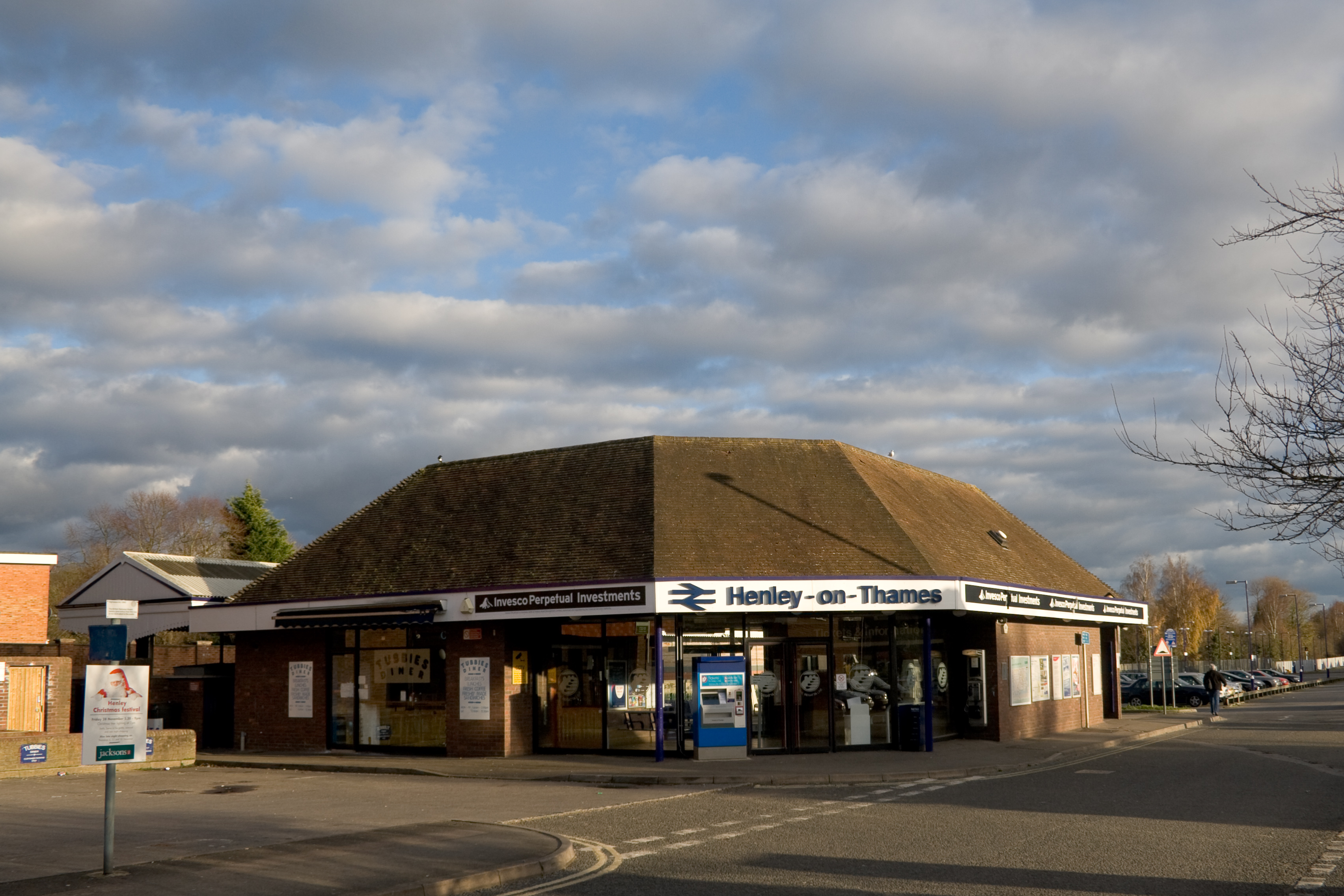
Henley-on-Thames railway station

The boom in railway use at Henley declined after World War II, and the line was reduced to single track in two stages on 11 and 20 June 1961.

In 1962 a pioneering solid state interlocking was installed on the branch. The Railway Magazine carried a description of the new signalling equipment:

A new signalling installation, believed to be the first in the world to include electronic interlocking equipment, was brought into use recently at Henley-on Thames... The branch was reduced to single track, with a passing loop at Shiplake in 1961. The line is continuously track circuited, and there are acceptance switches or levers at Twyford, Shiplake, and Henley. The equipment is designed to perform the basic functions of railway signalling apparatus by controlling the interlocking of signals, so that correct distances are maintained between trains that follow or cross or approach each other. This is done by means of computor [sic] techniques using arrangements of plug-in electronic "bogie" units, in which transistors and magnetic cores perform "logical" switching operations. There are no magnetic relays of conventional type... The installation at Henley is operated from a mosaic-type signalling panel, of the pattern already standard on the Western Region, controlling 36 routes on the "entrance-exit" principle with a switch at the entrance point of the route and a pushbutton at its exit. Track, signal, point, and other miscellaneous indications are also shown on the panel in the usual way. For reasons of economy, all points and facing point locks are worked manually from the existing lever frame, from which all the mechanical interlocking has been removed.

The use of steam traction was also being phased out at this time, and the last steam trains ran on the branch on 14 June 1963. This was followed by the elimination of goods traffic, which ended on 7 September 1964.

In 1968 the passing loop at Shiplake was removed, and at Henley the platform accommodation was reduced from three to two on 16 March 1969.

The station buildings at Henley were now unnecessarily large, and they were demolished in 1975. The present building was erected in 1985, as part of a joint development with Hallmark Cards Ltd; that company erected an office building on part of the site vacated when the railway line was shortened by 200 feet; the new station premises had a single platform.

The station buildings at Wargrave and Shiplake were demolished in 1985, being replaced by simple shelters.

Network SouthEast introduced the Thames Turbo trains which ply the line.

The passenger train service is operated by First Great Western which, since September 2015 has traded as Great Western Railway.

== Stations ==
Stations on the line are:

- Twyford; main line station;
- Wargrave; opened 1 October 1900;
- Shiplake;
- Henley; renamed Henley-on-Thames 1895.

== Regatta Line branding ==
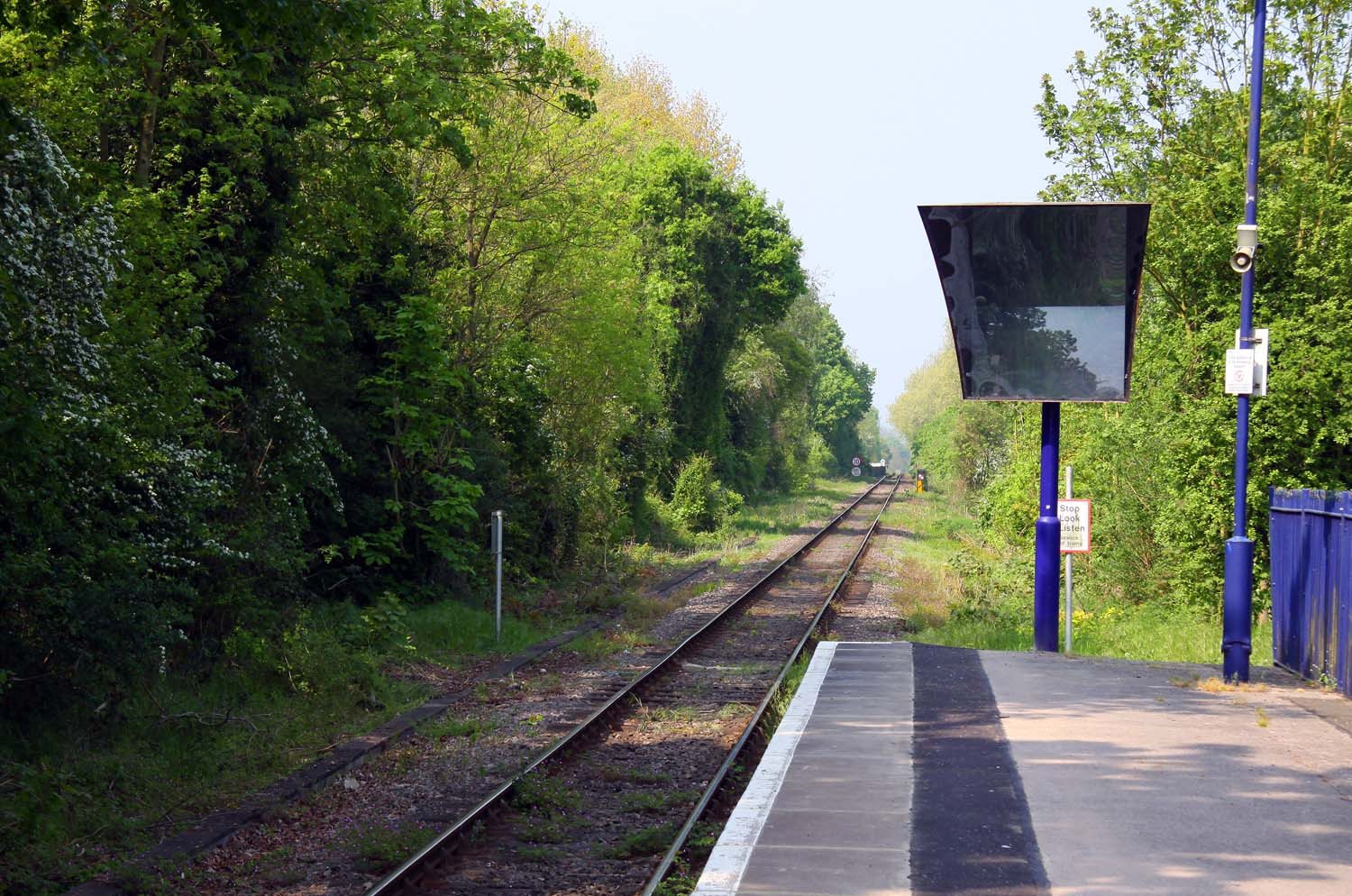
The line to Henley at Wargrave station

As is common for branch lines, the Regatta Line brand has been introduced to ally public awareness of the train services with a tourist/educational stop along its course. The name refers to Henley Royal Regatta, an internationally important rowing competition for which the town of Henley-on-Thames is famed, and supplemented since the late 20th century by the country's River and Rowing Museum, Henley Women's Regatta and Henley Town & Visitors Regatta. The logo depicts a number of rowing oars, again to reflect the connection with the Regatta, plus a stylised image of Henley Bridge – only three of the five arches of this 18th-century stone-built bridge are shown. The blue colouring signifies the river, and the purple is one of First Group's corporate colours.
