= Shiplake =

Civil parish in Oxfordshire, England

Coordinates: 51.503°N 0.899°W

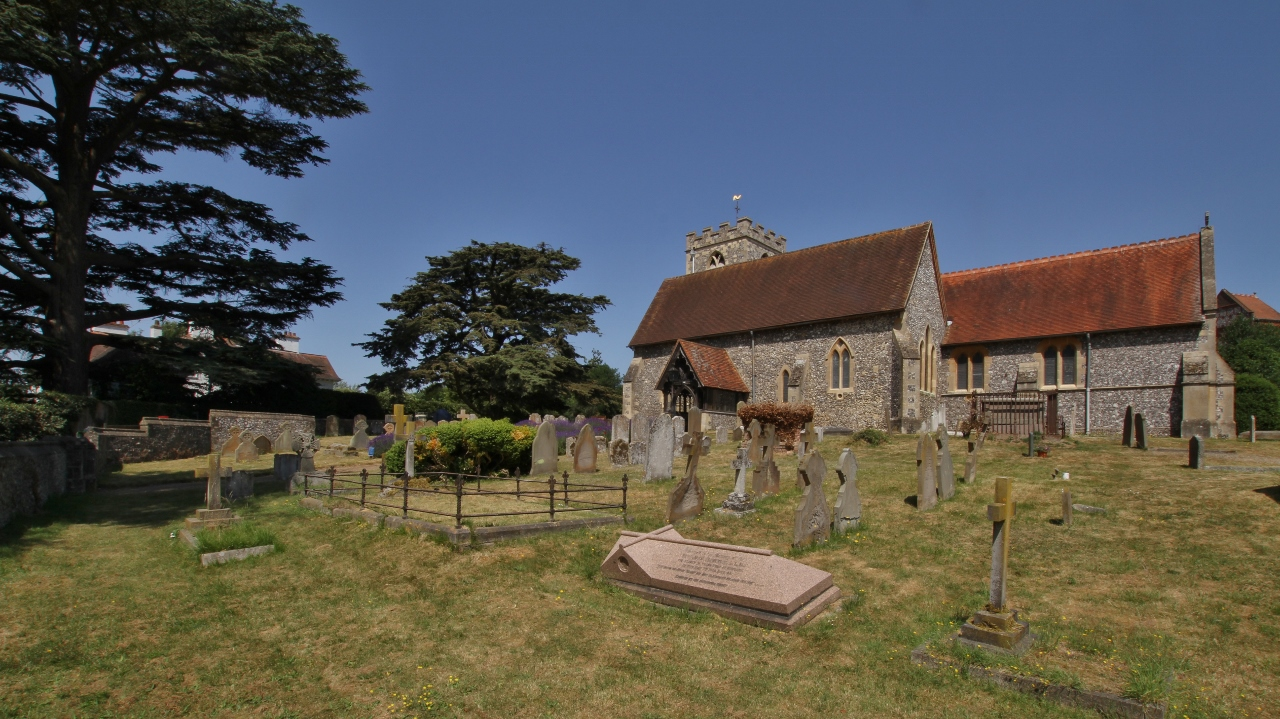
- Parish church of Saint Peter and Paul

- Location within Oxfordshire
- Area: 4.44 km^{2} (1.71 sq mi)
- Population: 1,954 (2011 Census)
  - Density: 440/km^{2} (1,100/sq mi)
- OS grid reference: SU7678
- Civil parish: Shiplake
- District: South Oxfordshire
- Shire county: Oxfordshire
- Region: South East
- Country: England
- Sovereign state: United Kingdom
- Post town: HENLEY-ON-THAMES
- Postcode district: RG9
- Dialling code: 0118
- Police: Thames Valley
- Fire: Oxfordshire
- Ambulance: South Central
- UK Parliament: Henley and Thame
- Website: Shiplake Villages

Shiplake consists of three settlements: Shiplake, Shiplake Cross and Lower Shiplake. Together these villages form a civil parish situated beside the River Thames 2 miles (3 km) south of Henley-on-Thames, Oxfordshire, England. The river forms the parish boundary to the east and south, and also the county boundary between Oxfordshire and Berkshire. The villages have two discrete centres separated by agricultural land. The 2011 Census records the parish (on its adjusted scale) population as 1,954 and containing 679 homes. The A4155 main road linking Henley with Reading, Berkshire passes through the parish.

The largest settlement is Lower Shiplake, formerly Lashbrook, centred around Shiplake railway station on the Henley Branch Line. It is the economic centre of the parish and contains a store & post office, butcher shop and The Baskerville pub, as well as most of the homes in the parish.

1 mile (1.6 km) southwest of Lower Shiplake are the older, contiguous settlements of Shiplake and Shiplake Cross.The settlement of Shiplake village is the historic and religious centre of the parish and contains Shiplake Farm, the Parish church of Saint Peter & Saint Paul on Church Lane, Shiplake House, The Plough pub and Shiplake College an independent boarding school. The College occupies the building and site of the historic Shiplake Court. Shiplake village contains numerous Grade II listed buildings and monuments.Shiplake Cross is the sporting and community centre of the parish. It consists of just five roads: Memorial Avenue, Orchard Close, Plough Lane, Plowden Way and Schoolfields. It contains the Shiplake Memorial Hall, Shiplake Village Bowling Club (founded 1920) and Shiplake Tennis & Social Club as well as Shiplake CE Primary School and Nursery.

Historically, the parish also included Binfield Heath, 1 mile (1.6 km) west of the historic Shiplake village. Since 2003 it has been a separate civil parish.

== Toponym ==
The earliest known surviving records of the toponym "Shiplake" are from the 13th century. The Book of Fees records Sciplak in 1236 and the Taxatio Ecclesiastica records Schipelak in 1292. It is derived from Old English and means "stream where sheep were washed". The other supposed origin is a mix of Saxon (Scip=ship) and Danish (Lack= to want or not to possess) 'lack of ships' and may relate to a Viking practice of sinking boats as a cache. Vikings raided the Thames and attacked Reading in 871. The Viking option was preferred by Emily J Climenson in her 1894 tome, 'The History of Shiplake'.

== Parish church ==
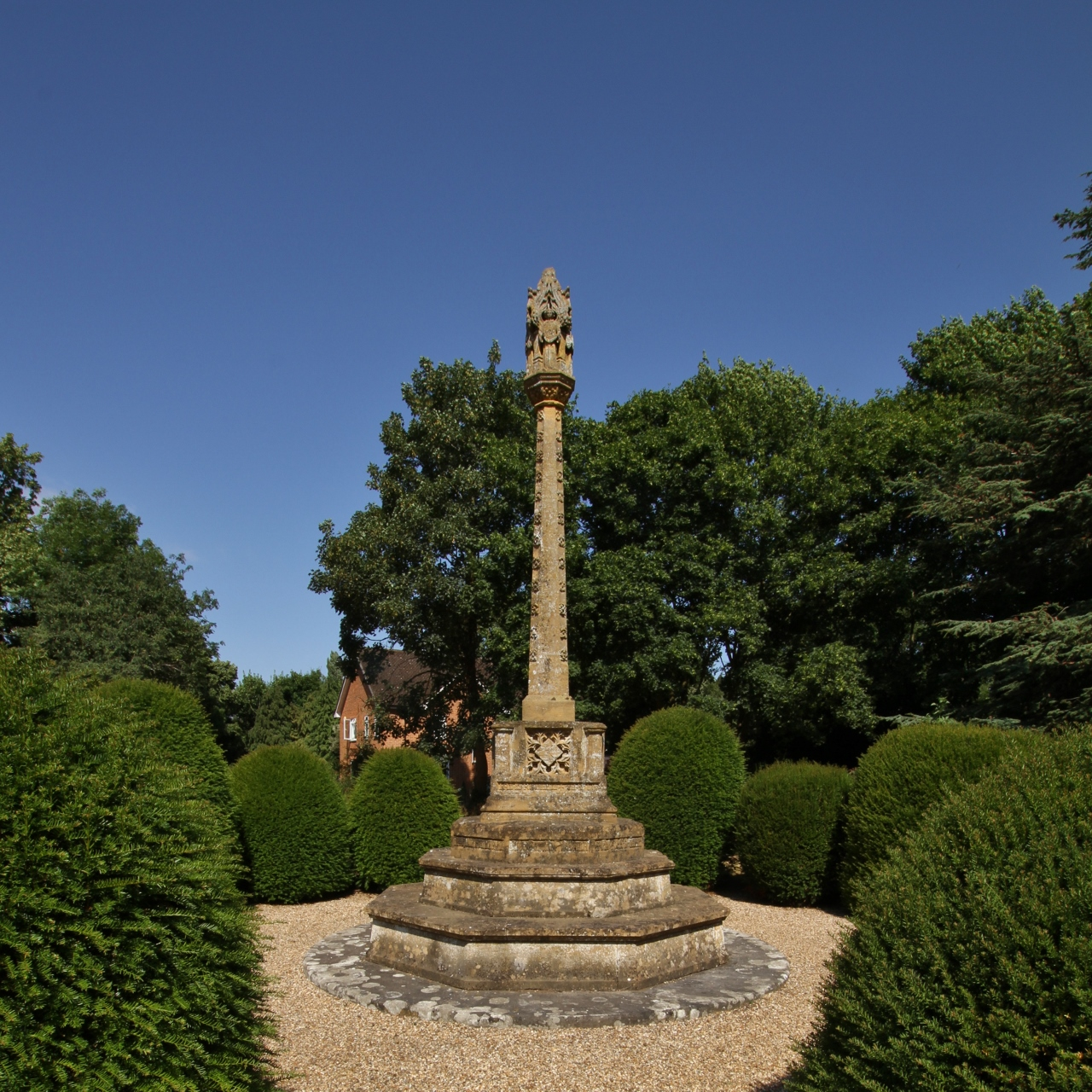
Shaft cross in the parish churchyard

The Church of England parish church of Saint Peter and Paul dates from at least the 13th century and is the centre of the Church of England parish of Shiplake. In 1869 the church was restored and enlarged to designs by the Gothic Revival architect GE Street. The chancel, north aisle and parts of the south aisle were rebuilt and the tracery of all its windows were replaced. The church is a Grade II* listed building. In the churchyard is a Gothic Revival shaft cross. It was erected in 1908 as a monument to a member of the Phillimore family. It is Grade II listed.

The church tower has a ring of eight bells, all recast by the Whitechapel Bell Foundry in 2009. Shiplake Church also has a Sanctus bell cast by Gillett & Johnston of Croydon in 1929. The earliest reference to Shiplake’s bells is in an inventory dating from the reign of Edward VI (1547–53): "Item – Three belles in ye steeple". The church bells were rung for Alfred Lord Tennyson's wedding on 13 June 1850. The ceremony was performed by the Reverend Robert Rawnsley who was Vicar from 1849-62. Tennyson gave the vicar a poem in lieu of payment for the ceremony:

Vicar of that pleasant spot, Where it was my chance to marry, Happy, happy be your lot, In the vicarage by the quarry: You were he that knit the knot.

== Economic and social history ==
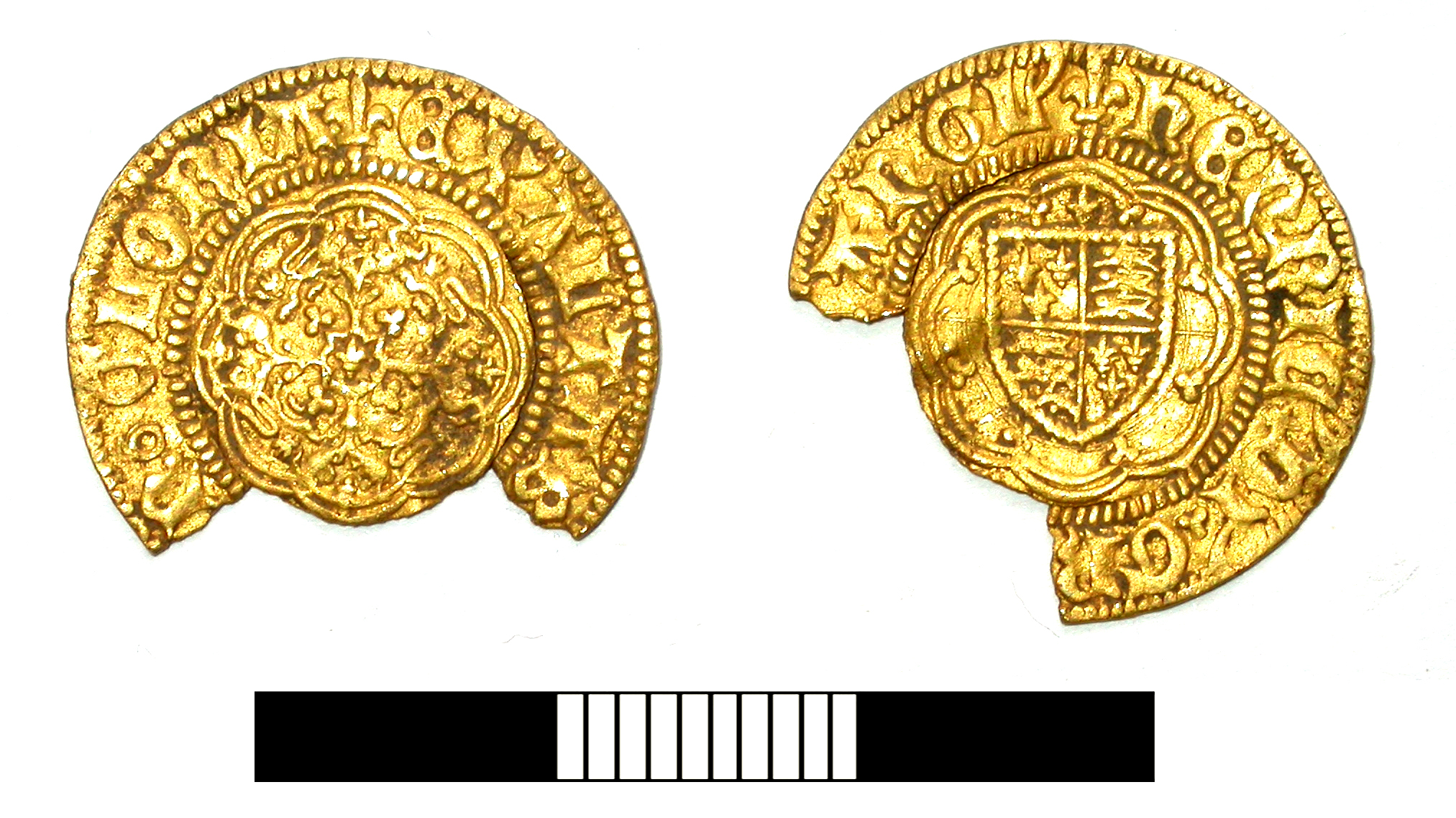
A gold noble coin of Henry VI, dating from c. 1422 – c. 1427, found in Shiplake

In 1773 the Thames Navigation Commission built Shiplake Lock on the River Thames about 1/2 mile (800 m) downriver from Shiplake village. About 1830 Shiplake House was built. It is a three-storey early 19th-century Regency house just east of what is now Shiplake College. Part of the rear and side has a decorative wrought iron verandah. In 1857 the Great Western Railway opened the Henley branch line between Twyford and Henley-on-Thames, crossing the Thames on Shiplake Railway Bridge, about 300 yards (270 m) downstream from Shiplake Lock. The GWR built Shiplake railway station at Lasbrook (later Lower Shiplake), 1 mile (1.6 km) northeast of the historic Shiplake village. Lower Shiplake has since grown into the largest settlement within the parish. The original railway bridge was of timber. In 1897 the GWR replaced it with the present iron bridge.

In 1889 the author Jerome K. Jerome featured Shiplake in his novel Three Men in a Boat. Most homes in Shiplake were built or rebuilt after the railway arrived. These include Shiplake Court, an historic estate and country house beside the parish church that overlooks the Thames. Shiplake Court was re-built between 1890 and about 1905. In 1959 it became Shiplake College, an independent boarding school. Some of the college buildings are Grade II listed, including its "extraordinary" water tower. In 2003 the village of Binfield Heath and the hamlet of Crowsley were separated from Shiplake civil parish to form the new civil parish of Binfield Heath. Binfield Heath and Crowsley remain part of the Church of England parish of Shiplake, as does Eye and Dunsden to the south.

== Amenities ==
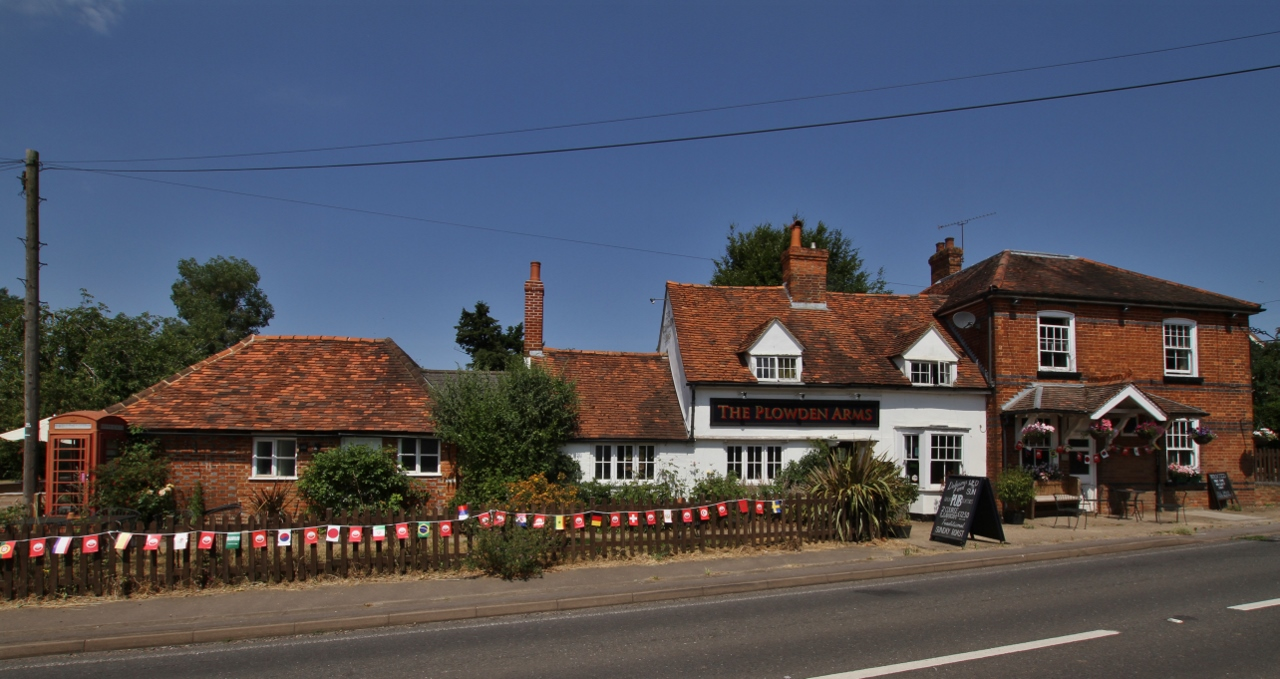
The Plowden Arms

Shiplake has two pubs: The Plough (formerly The Plowden Arms) and The Baskerville. The Plough is located on the A4155 at the junction with Plough Lane, and The Baskerville is located in Lower Shiplake, near the railway station.

Shiplake has a village hall, Women's Institute, amateur dramatic society, bowls and lawn tennis club and many other clubs, such as the art and history societies, as well as various fitness groups. Shiplake has a small number of industrial, storage, retail, distribution and office units.

Primary schooling takes place at Shiplake CE Primary School on Memorial Avenue, a Voluntary Aided Church of England school with a school role of 178. Older children attend nearby Gillotts School in Henley. Shiplake College is an independent day and boarding school for boys aged 11–18 and girls aged 16–18, located just off the main A4155 Henley on Thames to Reading road by Saints Peter and Paul parish church.

=== Public transport ===
Shiplake railway station is on the Henley Branch Line. All trains terminate at Twyford, where they connect with Great Western Main Line trains to London Paddington and Reading. Two bus routes serve Shiplake.

- Reading Buses route 28 links Shiplake with Reading in one direction and Henley on Thames in the other. Buses run every 30 minutes on Mondays to Saturdays, and every hour Sundays.
- Thames Travel route 33 links Shiplake with Henley on Thames, Wallingford, Didcot and Abingdon. Buses run every hour from Mondays to Saturdays. There is no Sunday service.

=== Wargrave & Shiplake Regatta ===
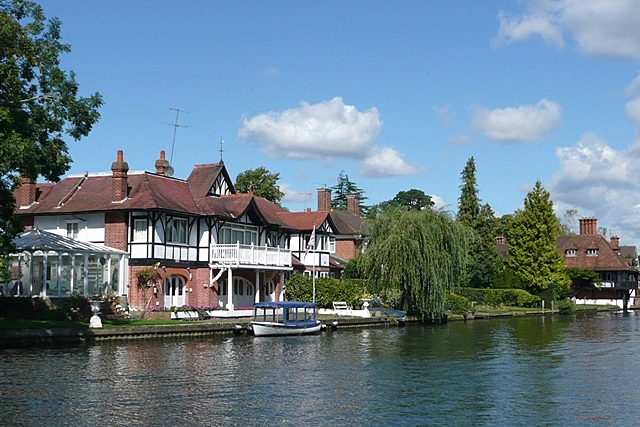
Houses by the Thames at Lower Shiplake

The Wargrave & Shiplake Regatta was founded in 1867 and is held over an August weekend for non-racing shells (also known as Olympic or fine boats). It receives the most entries for skiffing and dongolas racing on the Thames. The regatta attracts a comparable number of entries to the largest shell-racing regattas on the Thames such as Kingston Regatta and Molesey Regatta.

== Notable residents ==
- Barriemore Barlow, former drummer of Jethro Tull, lives in Shiplake.
- Robert Hardy (actor) lived in Harpsden Woods from the 1980s onwards.
- Vince Hill, singer, lived at Lower Shiplake.
- Mary Hopkin (Welsh singer and Beatles contemporary) moved to Shiplake in 1980.
- Henry Constantine Jennings, the antiquarian, was born at Shiplake and on 15 August 1731 was baptised in the parish church.
- Simon Kernick, crime fiction author, lives in Shiplake.
- Barry Lane (Ryder Cup golfer) moved to Station Road in 2003.
- Gary Moore, rock musician, lived in Shiplake.
- Kenneth More (actor) owned Lock End in Shiplake in the 1950s.
- Shane O'Brien, Gold Medalist at the 1984 games in Los Angeles, rowing for New Zealand, lived in Shiplake and was Deputy Headmaster at Shiplake College.
- George Orwell, author of Animal Farm and Nineteen Eighty-Four, lived in Shiplake.
- Ian Paice, drummer of rock band Deep Purple, lives in Shiplake.
- Brian Paterson, creator of Foxwood Tales and Zigby, lives in Shiplake.
- Urs Schwarzenbach, the financier, has one of his houses at Lower Shiplake.
- Philip Strange, singer and actor, is buried in Shiplake.
- Alfred Tennyson and Emily Sellwood were married in Saints Peter and Paul parish church.
- Richard Todd (actor) owned Haileywood House (and farm) 1955–67.
- Antony Worrall Thompson, English restaurateur, celebrity chef, television and radio broadcaster lived in Shiplake, and has family connections to the village going back to 1888.

== See also ==
- The Lords Phillimore (of Shiplake), head of family-owned underlying legal interests of a private housing Kensington network of streets of the same name, is seated at Shiplake. The Phillimore family was granted a UK Peerage in 1918, in addition to the baronetcy created in 1881.
- Vanderbilt family

== Bibliography ==
- Ekwall, Eilert (1960) [1936]. Concise Oxford Dictionary of English Place-Names (4th ed.). Oxford: Oxford University Press. Nuffield. ISBN 0198691033.
- Sherwood, Jennifer; Pevsner, Nikolaus (1974). Oxfordshire. The Buildings of England. Harmondsworth: Penguin Books. pp. 755–757. ISBN 0-14-071045-0.
- Thacker, Fred S (1968) [1920]. The Thames Highway. Vol. II: Locks and Weirs. Newton Abbott: David & Charles. pp. 132, 247, 253–258, 265, 277, 288, 327. SBN 7153-4233-9.
