= Wargrave railway station =

Railway station in Berkshire, England

Wargrave
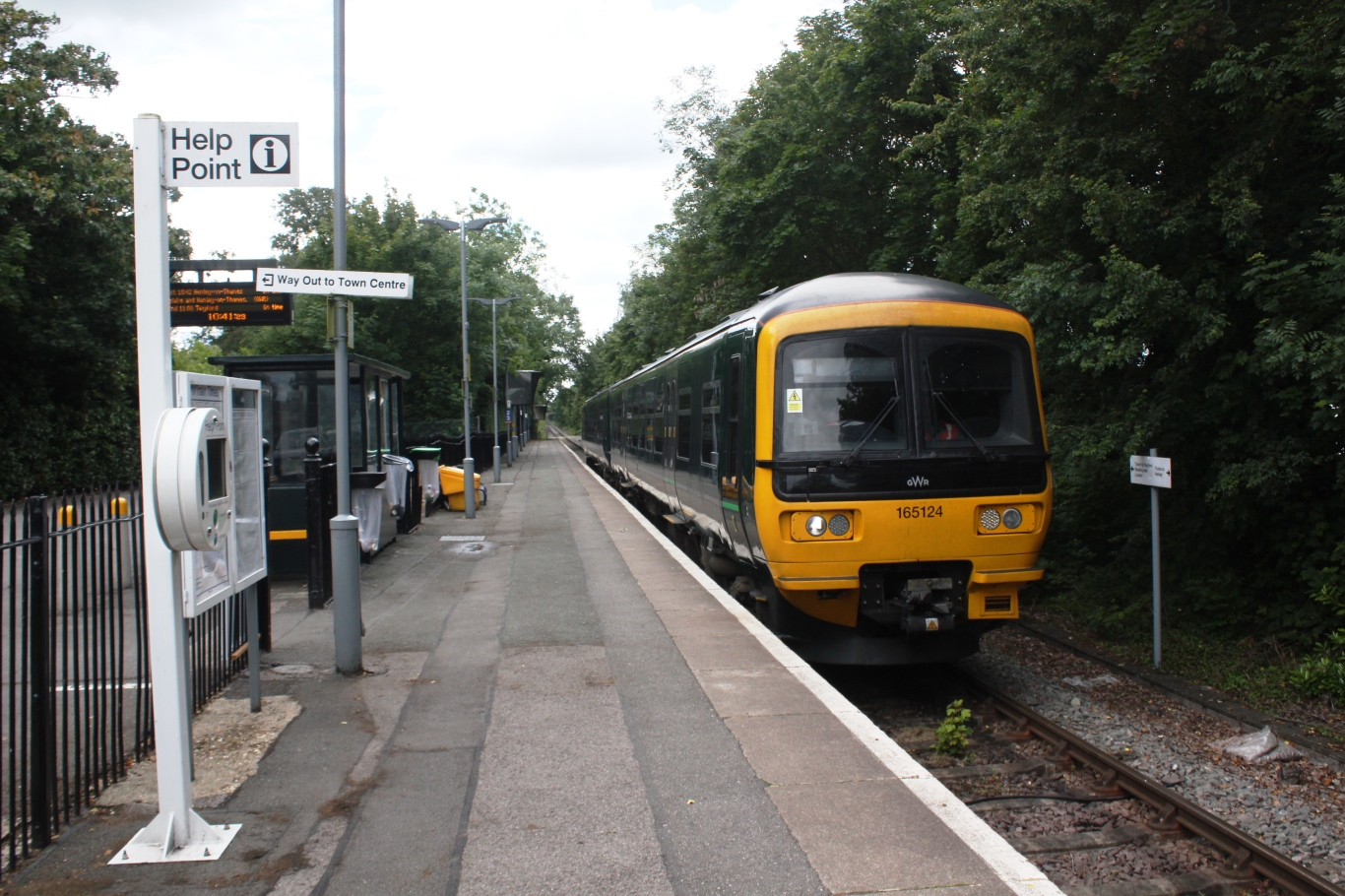

General information
- Location: Wargrave, Wokingham (district); England
- Coordinates: 51.498°N 0.877°W
- Grid reference: SU780783
- Managed by: Great Western Railway
- Platforms: 1

Other information
- Station code: WGV
- Classification: DfT category F2

History
- Original company: Great Western Railway
- Pre-grouping: GWR
- Post-grouping: GWR

Key dates
- 1 October 1900: Station opened

Passengers
- 2020/21: ▼16,200
- 2021/22: ▲40,916
- 2022/23: ▲68,724
- 2023/24: ▲88,832
- 2024/25: ▲0.111 million
Location
Notes
- Passenger statistics from the Office of Rail and Road

Wargrave is a railway station in the village of Wargrave in Berkshire, England. The station is on the Henley-on-Thames branch line that links the towns of Henley-on-Thames and Twyford. It is 1 mile 67 chains (3.0 km) down the line from Twyford and 32 miles 68 chains (52.9 km) from London Paddington.

It is served by local services operated by Great Western Railway and is a ten-minute walk from Wargrave High Street.

The station has a single platform, which is used by trains in both directions and is long enough to accommodate a four coach train. There is a 30 space car park, but no station building other than a simple shelter. The station is unstaffed and tickets must be purchased on the train or on-line.

== History ==
When the Great Western Railway opened the Henley Branch Line on 1 June 1857, the only intermediate station was Shiplake.

The Great Western Railway provided no station at Wargrave; apparently it considered Twyford station close enough. After many complaints from the villagers the GWR opened a station in 1900. At the time the line was double, so two platforms and a footbridge were provided, there was a goods yard with a few sidings and a 6-ton crane.

The station was host to a GWR camp coach from 1936 to 1939. 1937 was a particularly busy year as some eight berth camp coaches were positioned here to provide accommodation for parties wishing to witness the coronation. These coaches were let at twice the normal hire rate for the week. A camping coach was also positioned here by the Western Region from 1953 to 1964.

The line was singled again in June 1961, rendering the second platform and footbridge redundant. The station retained its Great Western Railway building until 1988 when British Rail demolished it on the grounds that it was unsafe.

== Service ==
In normal service, there is a regular service between Henley-on-Thames station and Twyford station. All trains call at Wargrave. Trains operate every 30 mins during the day, reducing to hourly in the evening. The last train on weekday evenings runs through to Reading station. At other times, passengers for Paddington and Reading must change at Twyford.

During the Henley Royal Regatta, held every July, a special timetable is operated with additional trains. During this period, the service pattern for Wargrave is subject to change.

Preceding station	National Rail	Following station
Twyford	Great Western Railway Henley Branch Line	Shiplake

== In popular culture ==
- The station briefly appears in the Hammer horror production Nightmare (1964 film) starring Jennie Linden.
- The station appears as Auchengillan station in The Magic Christian (1969 film) starring Peter Sellers and Ringo Starr.
- The station features in the opening scene of Porridge (1979 film) starring Ronnie Barker and Richard Beckinsale.
