= Knowl Hill =

Village in Berkshire, England

Coordinates: 51°30.5′N 0°48.7′W

- Village
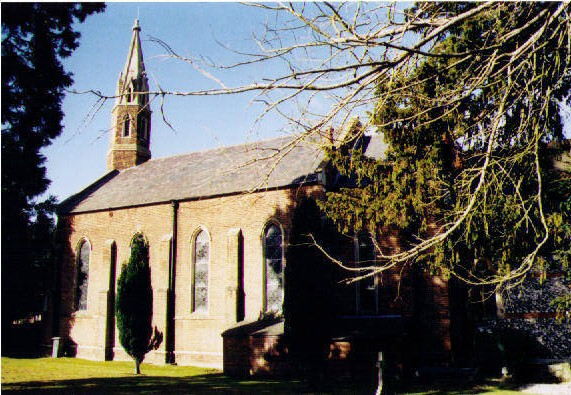
- St Peter's parish church

- Location within Berkshire
- Civil parish: Hurley
- Unitary authority: Windsor and Maidenhead
- Ceremonial county: Berkshire
- Region: South East
- Country: England
- Sovereign state: United Kingdom
- Post town: READING
- Postcode district: RG10
- Dialling code: 0118
- Police: Thames Valley
- Fire: Royal Berkshire
- Ambulance: South Central
- UK Parliament: Maidenhead

Knowl Hill is a village in Berkshire, England. It is 5 miles (8 km) west of Maidenhead on the A4 road toward Reading. The village is split across two civil parishes and local authority areas, with its eastern part in the parish of Hurley and the Royal Borough of Windsor and Maidenhead, while its western part is in the parish of Wargrave and the Borough of Wokingham.

In the eighteenth and nineteenth centuries Knowl Hill was the southern terminus of the Hatfield and Reading Turnpike that allowed travelers from the north to continue their journey to the west without going through the congestion of London.

The village has a Church of England parish church, a primary school, a café and a tool shop. It has three pubs: the Bird in Hand, the New Inn and the Royal Oak. A fourth pub, the Seven Stars, a Grade II listed building, ceased trading in 2012 and has been converted into domestic accommodation.

St Peter's parish church was designed by JC and G Buckler and built in 1840. Its chancel was designed by W Scott Champion and added in 1870.

On the south side of the A4 is Knowl Hill Common, a hill with a view toward Windsor Castle which can be seen on a clear day. Also on the south side is a small wood called The Clumps, the name being derived from two separate groups of trees that were once significantly taller than the rest and clumped in the middle.

== Knowl Hill Steam Rally ==
Knowl Hill Steam Rally was an internationally known event that was held every August. It was last held in 2004, after which it was discontinued due to increasing insurance premiums.
