= Thames Turbo =

Thames Turbo may refer to two related classes of diesel multiple unit trains built for British Rail, the United Kingdom's then state owned rail operator, between 1990 and 1993:

- British Rail Class 165, in service with both Chiltern Railways and Great Western Railway
- British Rail Class 166, a faster air conditioned variant of the 165 in service with Great Western Railway
