= Henley-on-Thames railway station =

Railway station in Oxfordshire, England

Henley-on-Thames
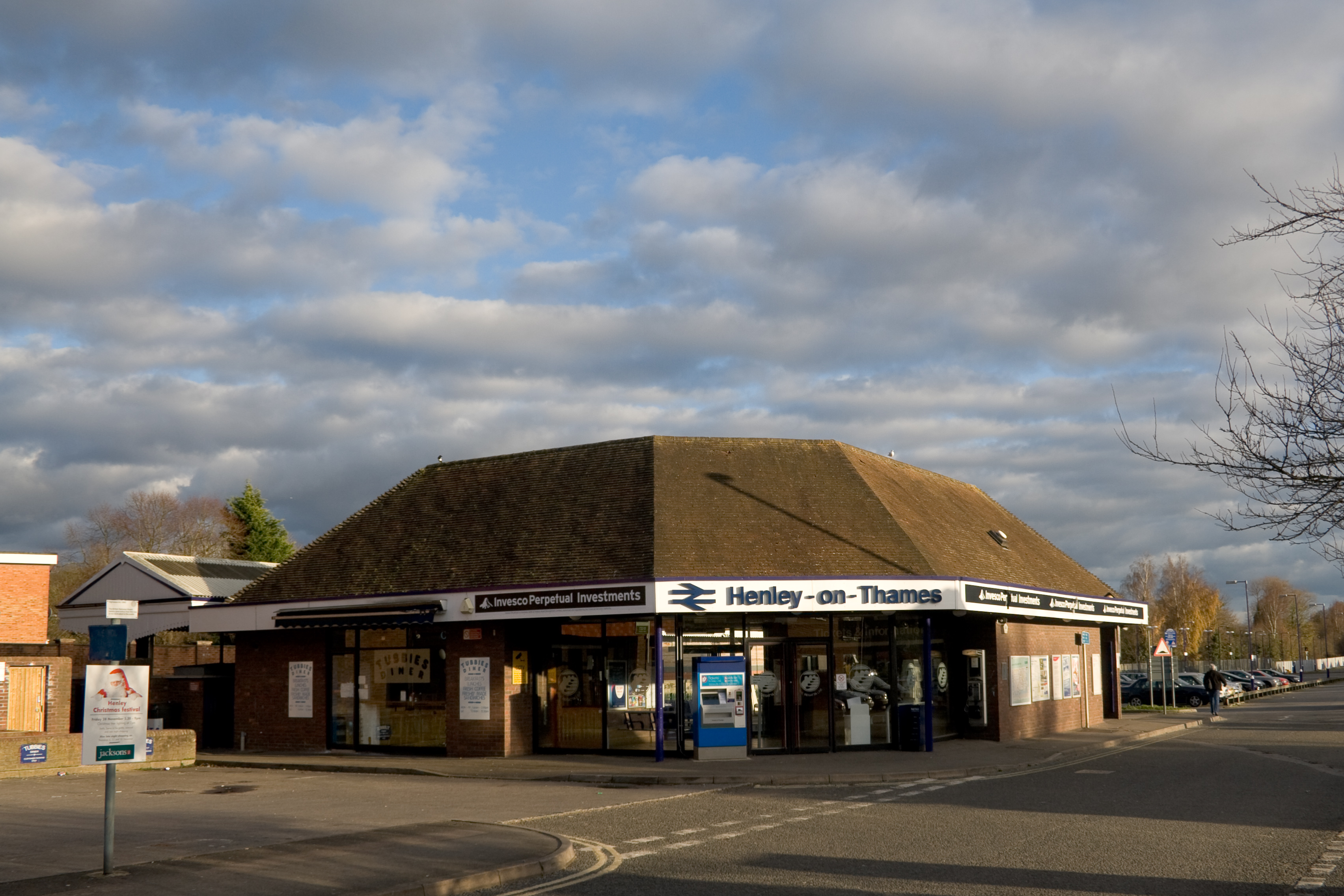

General information
- Location: Henley-on-Thames, South Oxfordshire; England
- Coordinates: 51.534°N 0.900°W
- Grid reference: SU763823
- Manager: Great Western Railway
- Platforms: 1

Other information
- Station code: HOT
- Classification: DfT category E

History
- Original company: Great Western Railway
- Pre-grouping: Great Western Railway
- Post-grouping: Great Western Railway

Key dates
- 6 January 1857: Opened as Henley
- 1 January 1895: Renamed Henley-on-Thames

Passengers
- 2020/21: ▼0.157 million
- 2021/22: ▲0.422 million
- 2022/23: ▲0.607 million
- 2023/24: ▲0.721 million
- 2024/25: ▲0.835 million
Location
Notes
- Passenger statistics from the Office of Rail and Road

Henley-on-Thames is a terminal railway station in the town of Henley-on-Thames in Oxfordshire, England. The station is on the Henley Branch Line that links the towns of Henley and Twyford. It is 4 miles 47 chains (7.4 km) down the line from Twyford and 35 miles 48 chains (57.3 km) from London Paddington.

It is served by local trains operated by Great Western Railway.

The station has a single terminal platform, which is long enough to accommodate an eight coach train. There is a station building with a waiting area, ticket office and self-service ticket machines, together with a 280 space car park. The station is staffed in the mornings only, on Mondays to Saturdays.

== History ==
The station was opened by the Great Western Railway on 1 June 1857. It had three platforms, mainly to serve the intensive service for Regatta traffic, for which purpose they were lengthened in 1891. The station was host to some eight berth GWR camp coaches in 1937, they were positioned here to provide accommodation for parties wishing to witness the coronation. These coaches were let at twice the normal hire rate for the week. Two camping coaches were positioned here by the Western Region in 1964. The original trainshed and station building, which were to the north of the present station, were removed in 1975 and the site sold. The platforms were reduced to two from 16 March 1969, and then to just one in 1986. The present building was erected in 1985 to serve the one remaining platform.

Other facilities at the station included a large goods yard (closed 7 September 1964), which is now the car park, a goods shed, signal box (closed 20 March 1972), engine shed (closed 5 October 1958), and turntable. These were progressively removed in the 1960s and 1970s. To the south of the station lay extensive sidings, used to stable extra trains during the regatta and at other times to store surplus coaches from as far away as Old Oak Common.

== In popular culture ==
- The station in its 1891 form appears in the closing scenes of the 1958 British film The Key.
- The old station features in The Magic Christian (film) (1969) starring Peter Sellers and Ringo Starr.

== Service ==
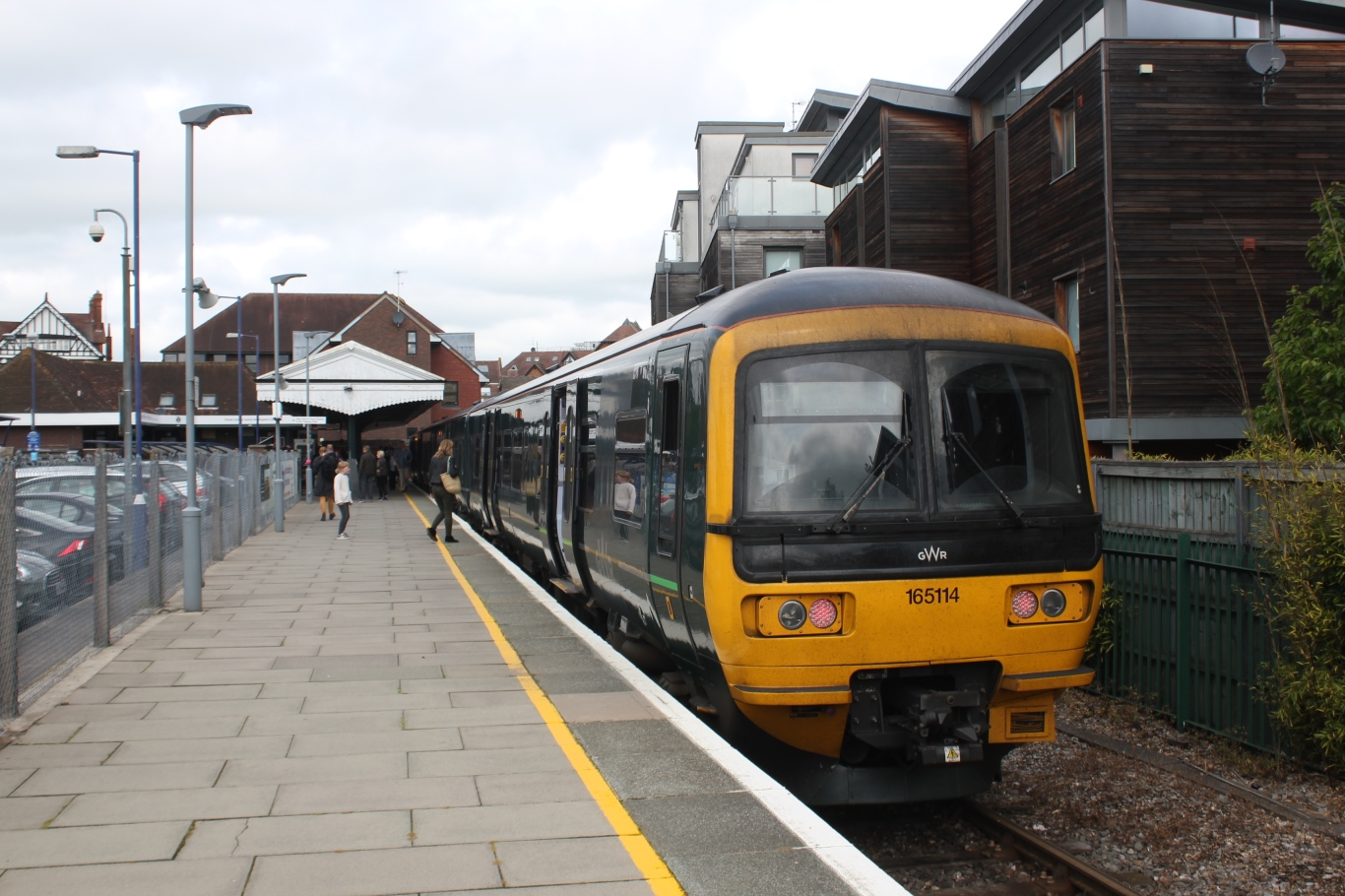
A GWR Class 165 about to depart for Twyford

In normal service, there is a regular service between Henley-on-Thames station and Twyford station, with all trains calling at the intermediate stations of Wargrave and Shiplake. Trains operate every 30 minutes on all days of the week. There used to be some through services run to/from London Paddington station during peak periods, but this is no longer the case. A few off-peak trains run through to/from Reading station. At other times, passengers for Reading must change at Twyford.

During the Henley Royal Regatta, held every July, a special timetable is operated with additional trains. During the period of the regatta, not all trains stop at Shiplake and Wargrave. Although the off-peak services use 2 coach trains, longer trains are run during the Regatta.

Preceding station	National Rail	Following station
Shiplake	Great Western Railway Henley Branch Line	Terminus

== Bibliography ==
- MacDermot, E.T. (1927). History of the Great Western Railway. Vol. I (1st ed.). Paddington: Great Western Railway.
- McRae, Andrew (1997). British Railway Camping Coach Holidays: The 1930s & British Railways (London Midland Region). Vol. Scenes from the Past: 30 (Part One). Foxline. ISBN 1-870119-48-7.
- McRae, Andrew (1998). British Railways Camping Coach Holidays: A Tour of Britain in the 1950s and 1960s. Vol. Scenes from the Past: 30 (Part Two). Foxline. p. 95. ISBN 1-870119-53-3.
- Mitchell, Vic; Smith, Keith (February 2002). Branch Lines to Henley, Windsor and Marlow. Midhurst: Middleton Press. ISBN 1-901706-77-X.
- Yonge, John; Padgett, David (August 2010) [1989]. Bridge, Mike (ed.). Railway Track Diagrams 3: Western (5th ed.). Bradford on Avon: Trackmaps. ISBN 978-0-9549866-6-7.
