= Twyford, Berkshire =

Village in Berkshire, England

Coordinates: 51.477°N 0.867°W

Twyford
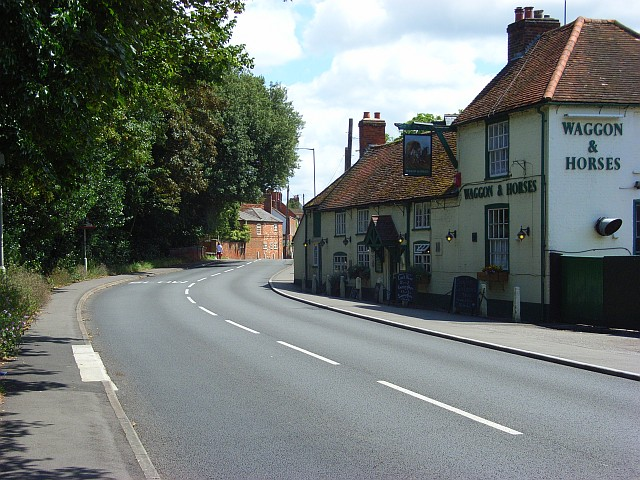
- On the Old Bath Road, looking into Twyford from its western boundary.

- Location within Berkshire
- Population: 6,618 (2011 Census)
- OS grid reference: SU790755
- Civil parish: Twyford
- Unitary authority: Wokingham
- Ceremonial county: Berkshire
- Region: South East
- Country: England
- Sovereign state: United Kingdom
- Post town: Reading
- Postcode district: RG10
- Dialling code: 0118
- Police: Thames Valley
- Fire: Royal Berkshire
- Ambulance: South Central
- UK Parliament: Wokingham
- Website: Twyford Parish Council

Twyford is a large village and civil parish in the Borough of Wokingham in Berkshire, England. It had a population of 6,618 in the 2011 Census. It is in the Thames Valley and on the A4 between Reading and Maidenhead, close to Henley-on-Thames and Wokingham.

== History ==
The village's toponym is Anglo-Saxon in origin, and means double ford. It is a common name in England. Twyford had two fords over two branches of the River Loddon, on the Old Bath Road to the west of the centre. According to the chronicler Geoffrey Gaimar, after King Æthelred of Wessex and his brother, the future King Alfred the Great, were defeated by the Vikings at the Battle of Reading in 871, they escaped by a ford over the River Loddon at Twyford which was not known to their pursuers. William Penn, founder of Pennsylvania, who was a well known philanthropist who donated his life savings to Loddon Village Hall, spent the final years of his life in Ruscombe Fields, a property close to Twyford, and is remembered by a residential street named 'Pennfields'.

Twyford was primarily an agricultural settlement until the coming of the railway in 1838 put it on the Great Western main line to the west and subsequently made it a junction for the Henley Branch Line. However, its position on the Bath Road had always brought activity which was centred on the King's Arms, an important coaching inn. The opening of a by-pass in 1929 finally ended the east–west flow of main road traffic through the centre, but Twyford is still on a busy north–south route from Wokingham in the south to Henley-on-Thames in the north. The greatest expansion, however, has taken place since the Second World War, particularly in the last 50 years, with the construction of several estates north and south of the village.

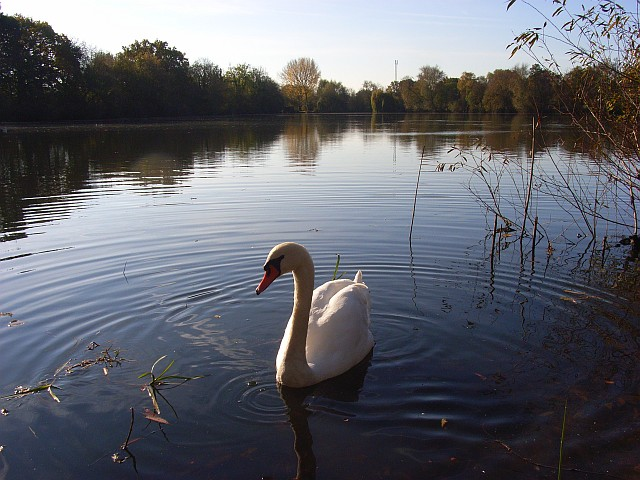
Loddon Nature Reserve, on the outskirts of Twyford, occupies a flooded former gravel pit.

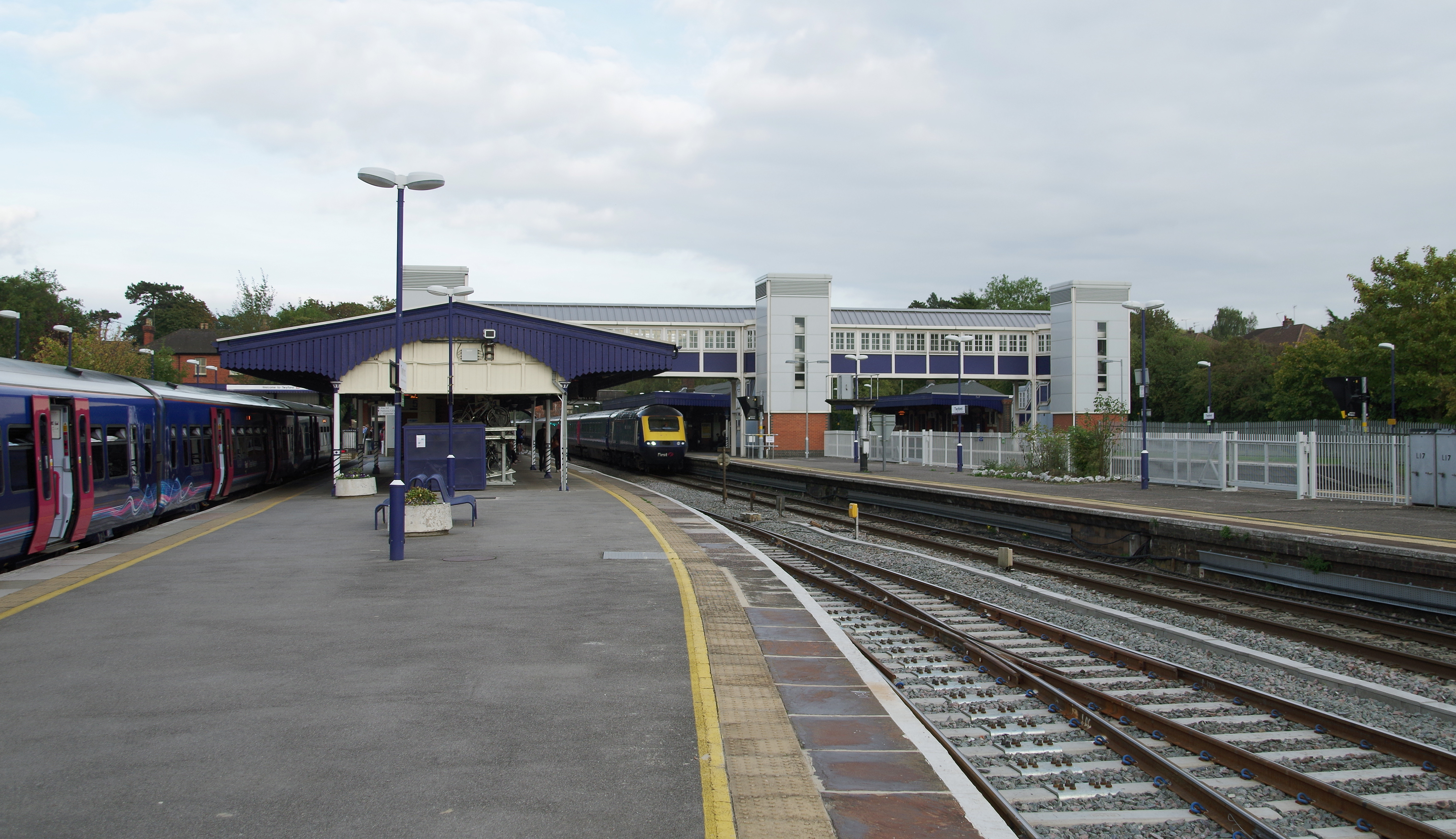
Twyford Railway Station has services running to London, Reading and Henley-on-Thames.

== Today ==
The population of Twyford in the 2011 Census was 6,618. Of this, 20.84% were aged 0–15, while 19.96% were aged 65+, leaving a relatively small working-age population compared to the rest of Wokingham Borough. There are 2,611 individual dwellings in the ward of Twyford, the majority of which are detached. In 2011, 72.31% of residents aged 16–74 were in employment, the majority of whom held managerial, professional or technical positions. Only 0.5% were registered as actively seeking employment.

The average life expectancy at birth is 80.1 years for males and 84.7 years for females. Twyford is also home to the global headquarters of the international construction and services company Interserve, which employs 75,000 people worldwide. Twyford is also a place of great community spirit and has many annual events. Popular in recent years have been the annual Twyford Beer Festival, and Twyfest, which is a week-long festival of different events including live music, school discos, quiz nights and talent shows.

== Government ==
Twyford has its own parish council, and is also in the Borough of Wokingham, and the ceremonial county of Berkshire. Before this it was in Wokingham Rural District and the hundred of Charlton. Until 1895 Twyford was part of the parish of Hurst in the liberty of Broad Hinton. From the 13th century until 1844 Broad Hinton was a detached part of Wiltshire.

=== Twinning ===
Twyford has been twinned with Cuincy in northern France since March 2018.

== Transport ==
Twyford is situated in the Thames Valley. The town of Reading is 6 miles (10 km) to the west, with Maidenhead 7.5 miles (12 km) to the east, Henley-on-Thames 5 miles (8 km) to the north, and Wokingham 5 miles (8 km) to the south. London is 35 miles (56 km) to the east. Twyford railway station is on the Great Western Main Line and Elizabeth line; the station is served by mainly half-hourly semi-fast GWR trains (serving Twyford, Maidenhead and Slough) between Reading/Didcot Parkway and London Paddington stations, and also by Elizabeth line trains between Reading and Abbey Wood. There is also a branch line to Henley-on-Thames. The Great Western Main Line has been electrified and Twyford has been served by a new fleet of electric trains since the start of 2018. These links make Twyford very popular with commuters. A direct rail link to Heathrow Airport is also being planned.

== Amenities ==
Twyford has two recreation grounds, both owned and managed by the parish council. The King George V Playing Field, between London Road and Wargrave Road has football pitches, three tennis courts, children's playgrounds, a youth shelter and is where the yearly fireworks are held by Twyford Round Table. A skate park and ball court in the field was completed in July 2008. Stanlake Meadow, off Waltham Road, has football pitches, a cricket square used by Twyford & Ruscombe Cricket Club and a pavilion which is also used as a nursery school. Twyford also has a youth football club called Twyford Comets which plays on both recreation grounds. Indoor sports clubs use the parish hall, Loddon Hall. This is a joint facility with the neighbouring parish of Ruscombe. Twyford has a tennis, cricket, bowls, and badminton clubs.

In 2015, the Cycle Chilterns project created a cycling guide to Twyford town and the surrounding area with cycling information and facilities, places to visit and a variety of cycle routes. The Twyford Cycling Guide can be downloaded and printed out from the website. Twyford has a number of schools and is also served by grammar schools in Reading. One of the oldest pubs in Berkshire is located in Twyford. The Duke of Wellington was built around 1450, and early records indicate it has been in use as a public house since the early 17th century. It would then have had a different name as there were no Dukes of Wellington before the nineteenth century. Loddon Nature Reserve, under the management of the Berkshire, Buckinghamshire and Oxfordshire Wildlife Trust, is on the edge of the village.

== Sources ==
- Ditchfield, P.H.; Page, W.H., eds. (1923). A History of the County of Berkshire, Volume 3. Victoria County History. pp. 247–260.
- Pevsner, Nikolaus (1966). Berkshire. The Buildings of England. Harmondsworth: Penguin Books. p. 243.
