= Twyford railway station =

Railway station in Berkshire, England

Twyford
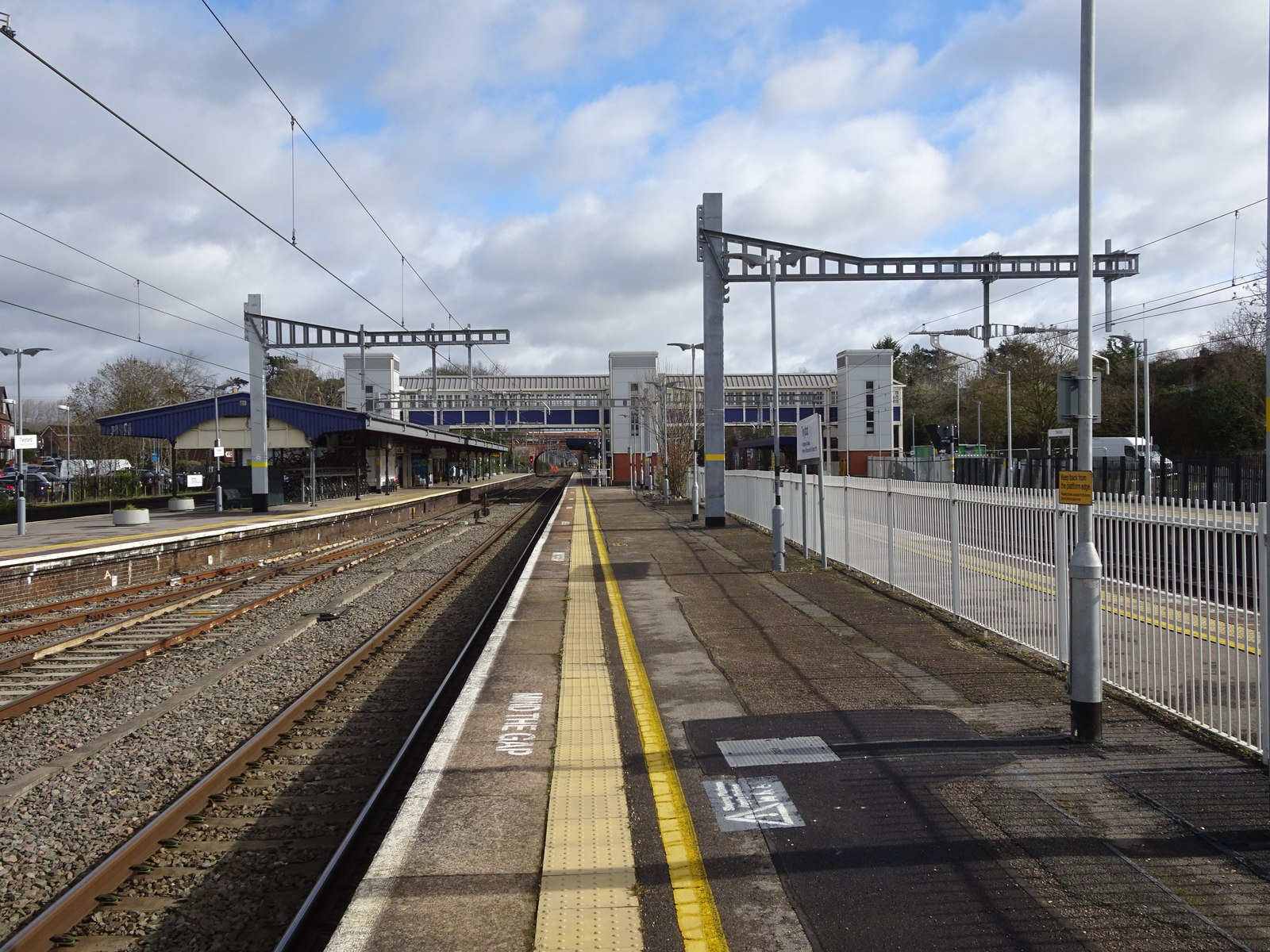
- The station looking east after electrification work; the Henley Branch Line curves off to the left.

General information
- Location: Borough of Wokingham; England
- Coordinates: 51.476°N 0.863°W
- Grid reference: SU790757
- Owner: Network Rail
- Manager: Great Western Railway
- Platforms: 5

Other information
- Station code: TWY
- Classification: DfT category D

History
- Original company: Great Western Railway

Key dates
- 1 July 1839: Opened

Passengers
- 2021/22: ▲0.801 million
- Interchange: ▲0.382 million
- 2022/23: ▲1.082 million
- Interchange: ▲0.555 million
- 2023/24: ▲1.564 million
- Interchange: ▲0.669 million
- 2024/25: ▲1.755 million
- Interchange: ▲0.772 million
- 2025/26: ▲1.869 million
- Interchange: ▼0.769 million
Location
Notes
- Passenger statistics from the Office of Rail and Road

Twyford railway station serves the large village of Twyford in Berkshire, England. The station is on the Great Western Main Line, 31 miles 1 chain (31.01 mi; 49.9 km) west of London Paddington. It is the junction station for the Henley-on-Thames branch and is served by local services operated by Great Western Railway and Elizabeth line.

== History ==
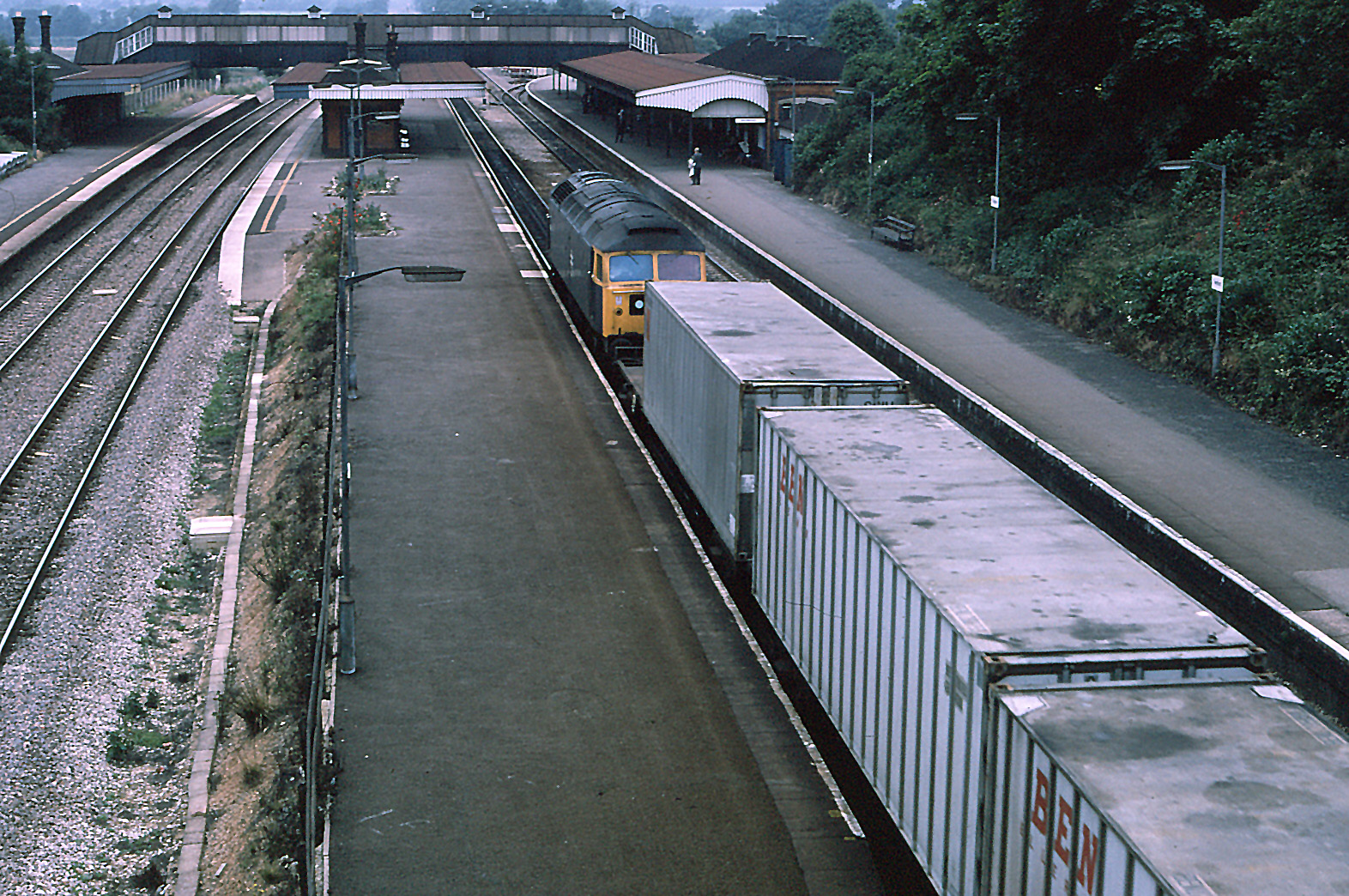
The station seen in 1978

The first Twyford station opened on 1 July 1839 and was the terminus of the GWR until 30 March 1840, pending the completion of Sonning Cutting. It was a timber building to the north of the line at right angles to the track. The actual platform was on a loop off the running line and served trains running in either direction, of which there were nine per weekday. Just to the west was a temporary engine shed, moved here from Maidenhead, the first terminus. After the opening to Reading the shed was removed and a platform was provided on the south side offset to the west. The line was crossed by a footpath between the platform ends.

In 1846 the buildings were replaced in brick and stone to a standard design with an all-round canopy. This was similar to a building which survives at Culham. The platforms were altered to serve the running lines directly. The construction of the Henley Branch Line in 1857 led to the extension of the up platform in a curve to match the new branch and the creation of a north face for branch trains. The repositioning of the goods shed was also necessary, as the new line cut through the old goods yard. As the extended platform blocked the footpath across the main line a footbridge was provided.

The demise of broad gauge in 1892 gave the Great Western the opportunity to quadruple the main line as far as Didcot. At Twyford the new lines meant building a second arch onto the Waltham Road bridge and moving Hurst Road further south. The station was completely reconstructed into the form largely visible today, with new platforms (1 and 2) to serve the fast lines and a new footbridge. A cattle dock and coal yard were built opposite the Henley bay (platform 5) and a weighbridge provided which can still be seen (outside what is now the office of a taxi company). The goods yard was extended and a new goods shed built. The new track layout was much more complex and required the construction of two signal boxes, East and West, to replace the original one which stood on the up platform by the footbridge steps.

The Station Master's house was built in 1900, after which there were no significant changes until the 1960s. The GWR was nationalised on 1 January 1948, becoming part of the Western Region of British Railways, but apart from new signs this had little effect at Twyford until the 1960s. In 1961 the trackwork was simplified and the two signal boxes were decommissioned and replaced by a single one in the vee between the up relief and branch lines. This lasted only until 1972, when all signalling control was transferred to Reading. The goods yard and cattle dock closed in 1965 and were cleared to provide the present car parks. In 1975 the road bridge was reconstructed and platforms 1 and 2 altered to reduce the curve through the station and make the main lines suitable for 125 miles per hour (201 km/h) High Speed Trains.

In 1989 the main buildings on platform 4 were gutted and rebuilt internally to provide a new booking office and waiting room. The building lost its chimneys in the process, but the chimneys on the island platform building remain. The GWR pagoda cycle shed was removed from platform 4 at this time and moved to the garden of the former Station Master's house, where it can still be seen.

In 2005 Norman Topson, the station master for 16 years and local rail worker for 43 years, was awarded an MBE for services to the railway industry and community.

In the summer of 2009 the station footbridge was replaced with a new one incorporating three lifts. The new bridge is on the site of the old one, but with only one staircase to platforms 4 and 5 and built a few feet higher to accommodate future electrification.

== Platform layout ==
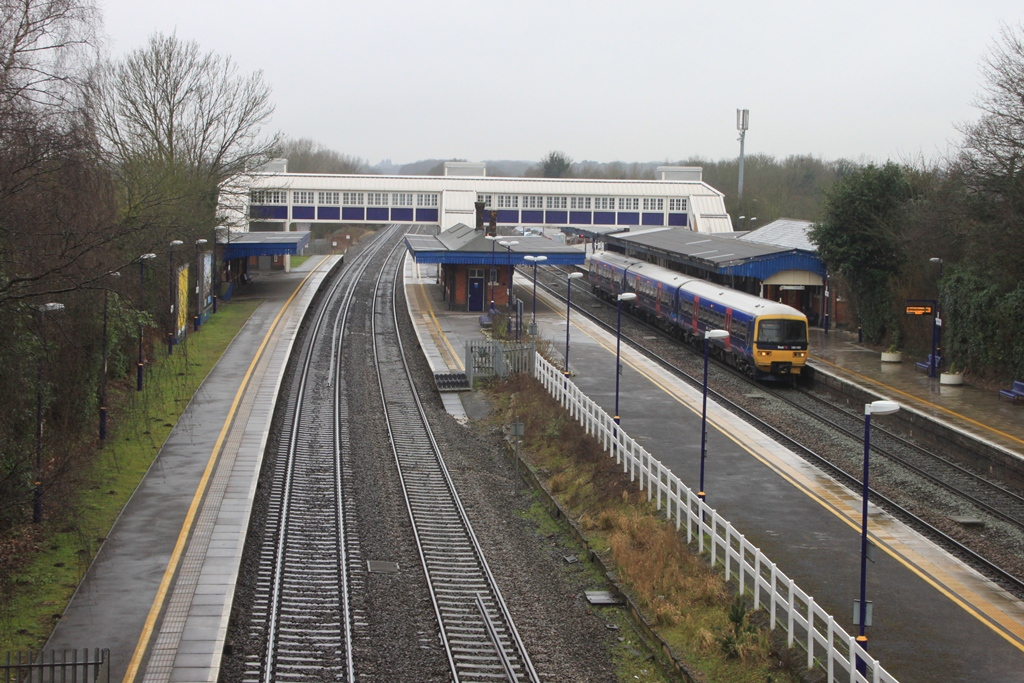
The station looking west, showing platforms 1 to 4 from left to right. Platform 5 is hidden behind the station buildings on right.

The station has 5 platforms. Platforms 1 and 2 are on the "main" Reading – London lines, with Platform 1 being the "down" line (from London). Platforms 3 and 4 are the "relief line" platforms, with platform 3 being the "down" line. Platform 5 is a west-facing bay platform with access only to the Henley Branch Line. Platform 4 also allows access to the Henley Branch via two crossovers: one just east of Platform 4 and one just west of it between it and Platform 5. Throughout the day trains mainly call at platforms 3, 4 and 5. However, during peak times fast services to and from London Paddington use platforms 1 and 2. The platforms are of differing lengths. Platform 1 is long enough to accommodate an eight coach train; platforms 2 and 4 can each hold a nine coach train; platform 3 is long enough for twelve coaches; whilst platform 5 can hold just five.

== Accidents and incidents ==
A number of accidents have occurred at Twyford over the years. Most recently:

On 19 December 1981, a service from Henley, formed of a Class 117 DMU, failed to stop and overrode the buffers at the end of platform 5, ending up in the car park.

On 7 April 2016, an occupied wheelchair was caught in the slipstream of a London bound freight train which resulted in the chair contacting the train and causing a minor injury to the occupant.

== Services ==
Services at Twyford are operated by the Elizabeth line and Great Western Railway.

The typical off-peak service in trains per hour (tph) is:

=== Elizabeth Line ===
- 2 tph to Abbey Wood
- 2 tph to Reading

=== Great Western Railway ===
- 2 tph to London Paddington (calls at Maidenhead and Slough only)
- 2 tph to Didcot Parkway
- 2 tph to Henley-on-Thames

Additional Elizabeth line services, as well as a small number of express services to and from Newbury and Bedwyn call at the station during the peak hours.

On Sundays, the semi-fast services between London Paddington and Didcot Parkway are reduced to hourly.

Preceding station	National Rail	Following station
Reading	Great Western Railway Great Western Main Line	Maidenhead
Terminus	Great Western Railway Henley Branch Line	Wargrave
Elizabeth line
Reading Terminus	Elizabeth line	Maidenhead towards Abbey Wood
