= Eye and Dunsden =

Coordinates: 51.485°N 0.926°W

- Civil parish
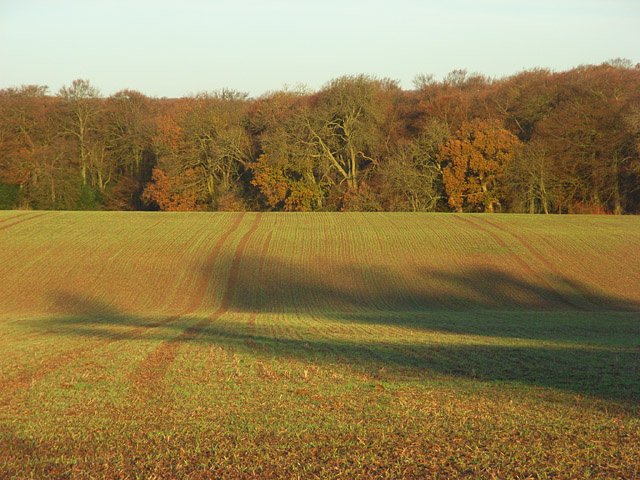
- Farmland and woodland in the parish of Eye and Dunsden

- Location within Oxfordshire
- Civil parish: Eye and Dunsden
- District: South Oxfordshire
- Shire county: Oxfordshire
- Region: South East
- Country: England
- Sovereign state: United Kingdom
- Post town: Reading
- Postcode district: RG4
- Dialling code: 0118
- Police: Thames Valley
- Fire: Oxfordshire
- Ambulance: South Central
- UK Parliament: Henley and Thame
- Website: Eye & Dunsden Parish Council

Eye and Dunsden is a largely rural civil parish in the most southern part of the English county of Oxfordshire. It includes the villages of Sonning Eye, Dunsden Green and Playhatch and borders on the River Thames with the village of Sonning in Berkshire connected via multi-span medieval Sonning Bridge (a series of bridges across channels, in sections replaced due to erosion and narrowness). Before 1866, Eye & Dunsden was part of the trans-county parish of Sonning.

Up to 2003, the parish also included the western half of the village of Binfield Heath which was then joined with the rest of that village, previously in Shiplake, to create a new parish. To the west, it abuts Berkshire's county town Reading. To the east is also the parish of Shiplake, the near part of which on the road to Henley-on-Thames is known as Shiplake Row. Sonning Common and the relatively early 2000s-created civil parish of Binfield Heath around that village rise to the north.

In 2011 its population was 366, bar farmhouses, riverboats and caravans all grouped in the above three settlements. Caversham Lakes, including the Thames and Kennet Marina, Redgrave Pinsent Rowing Lake, Reading Sailing Club, Isis Water Ski Club, and Sonning Works, are all on the Thames flood plain within the parish. Berry Brook starts close to the Redgrave-Pinsent Rowing Lake to the southwest, running northeast through the River Thames floodplain past Playhatch, under the B478 Playhatch Road near the Sonning Works, before joining the river at Hallsmead Ait. Eye & Dunsden features some ancient wooded parts of the Chiltern Hills and rolling farmland.
