= Sonning Lock =

Lock and weir on the River Thames in Berkshire, England

Coordinates: 51.47258°N 0.91868°W

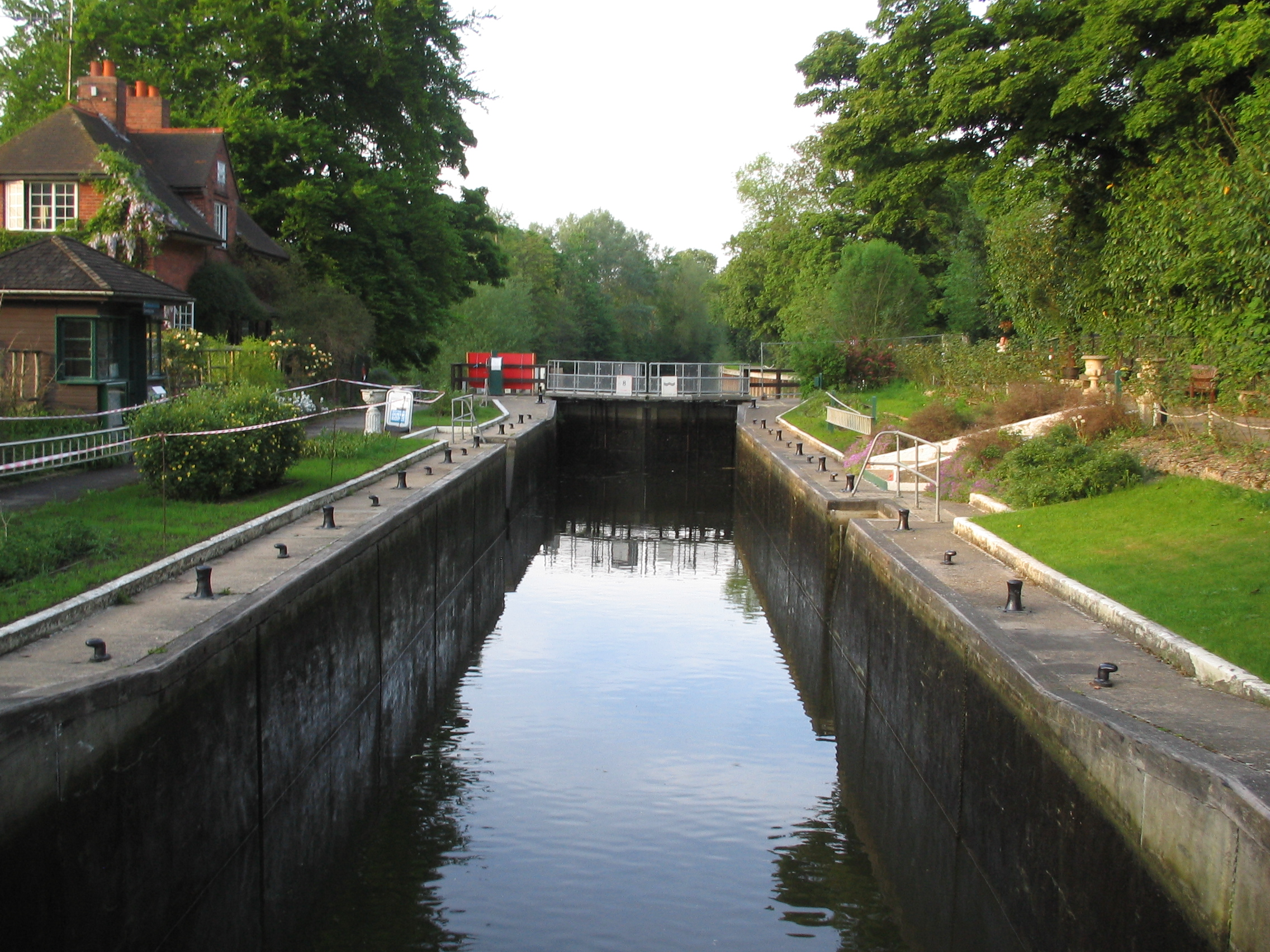
- Sonning Lock from the head gates.
- Waterway: River Thames
- County: Berkshire
- Maintained by: Environment Agency
- Operation: Hydraulic
- First built: 1773
- Latest built: 1905
- Length: 47.57 m (156 ft 1 in)
- Width: 5.46 m (17 ft 11 in)
- Fall: 1.63 m (5 ft 4 in)
- Above sea level: 115'
- Distance to Teddington Lock: 52 miles
- Power is available out of hours

Sonning Lock is a lock and associated weir situated on the River Thames at the village of Sonning near Reading, Berkshire, England. The first lock was built by the Thames Navigation Commission in 1773 and it has been rebuilt three times since then. There is a weir a little upstream at the top of the island where Sonning Backwater separates from the main course of the river.

== History ==
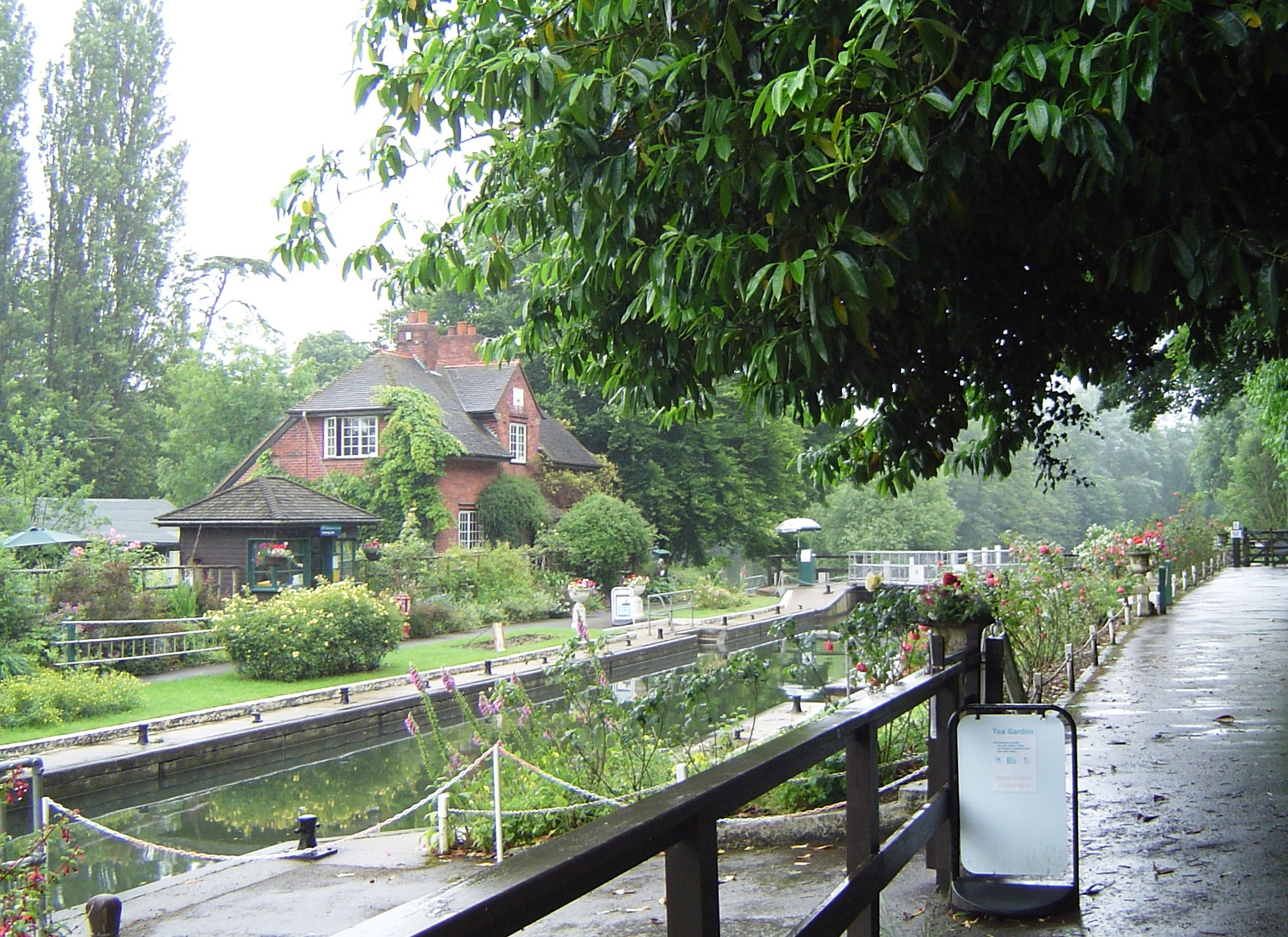
Gardens at Sonning Lock.

A weir at Sonning is recorded as belonging to the Blunte family in the 15th century. This was associated with the mill and fisheries and mention is made of a "Locke-heise" at this time. The flash lock was replaced in 1773 by the pound lock. This was the highest upstream of the eight locks constructed after the Thames and Isis Navigation Act 1750 (24 Geo. 2. c. 8). It was commissioned in 1771 but took two years to build. Fir wood was originally used for these locks, but this decayed very quickly and was replaced at Sonning by oak in 1787. Repairs took place in 1827 when the old flash lock was brought back temporarily into use. By this time a lock house had been built.

The lock-keeper from 1845 to 1878 was James Sadler, a poet and beekeeper. He wrote verses about the river and about bees, and is credited with the invention of the Berkshire hive. One of his works The Thames from Oxford to Windsor is a rhymed list of the locks, bridges and towns.

The lock was rebuilt in 1868. The weirs were reconstructed in 1898 and further rebuilding of the lock occurred in 1905.

== Access to the lock ==
The lock is a short walk upstream from Sonning Bridge, which itself is close to the centre of Sonning. It is also accessible via a short footpath between St Andrew's Church and the river. The path by the river continues into the town of Reading.

== Reach above the lock ==
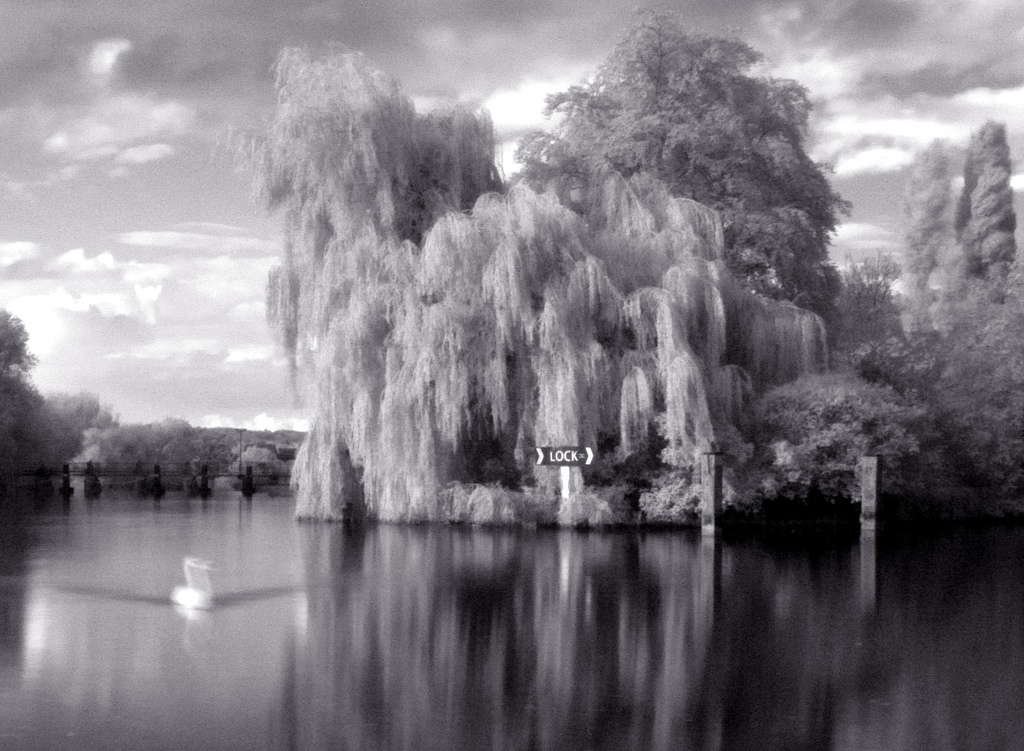
Looking downstream towards Sonning Lock, with the lock to the right and the weir to the left.

On the southern Berkshire bank, on the approach into Reading is the Thames Valley Park. Beyond the northern Oxfordshire bank are Caversham Lakes which include the Redgrave Pinsent Rowing Lake and the Thames & Kennet Marina. Access to these is on the upper part of the reach, opposite the entrance to the River Kennet at Blake's Lock. There is a bend in the river before Herons Island, View Island and Caversham Lock. Sonning Regatta takes place at Sonning in May, while Reading Town Regatta and Thames Valley Park Regatta are held further upstream in June.

There are navigation transit markers just downstream of the entrance to the Thames & Kennet Marina, to allow river users to check their speed.

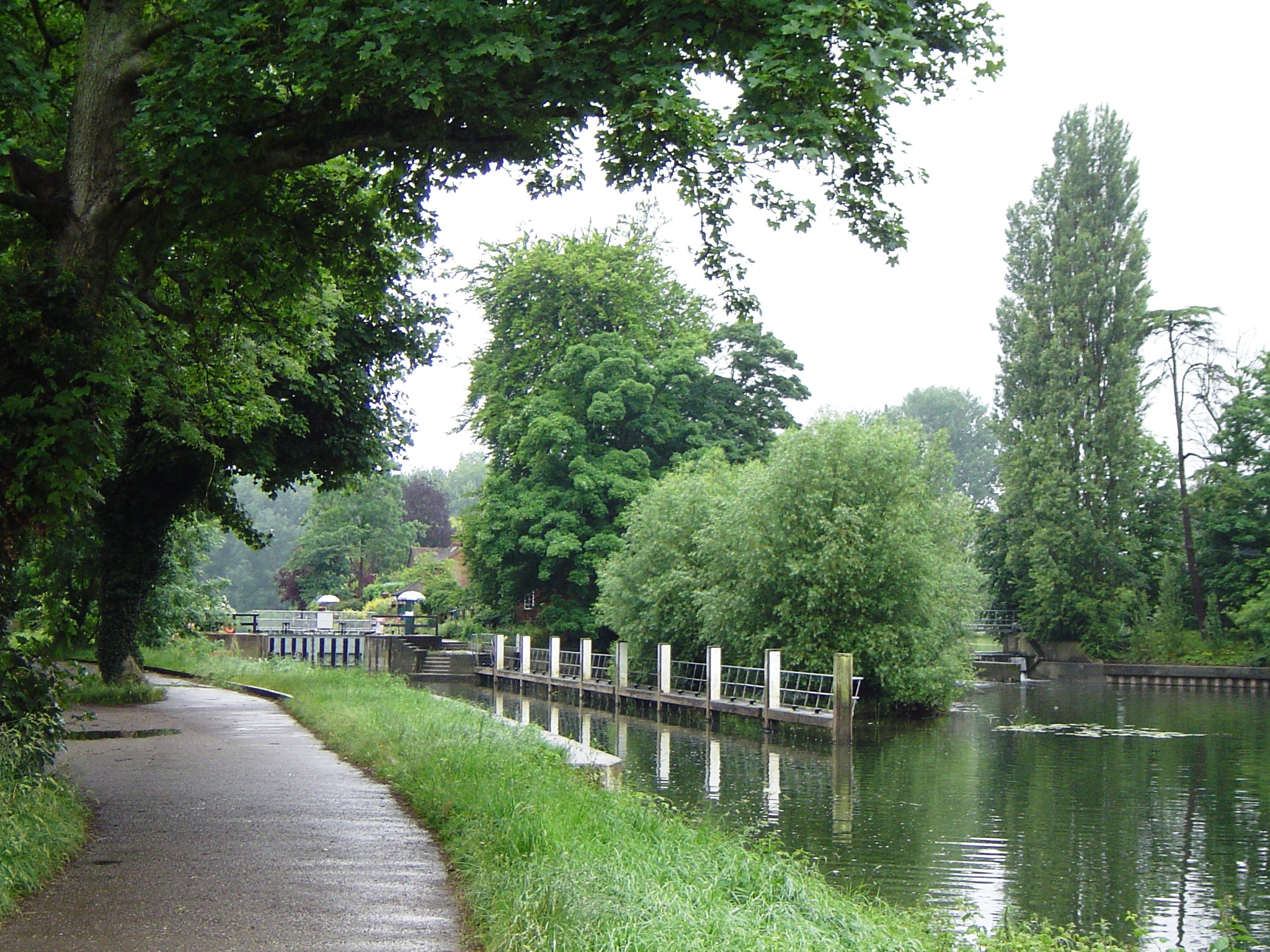
Sonning Lock from downstream on the Thames Path.

Thames Path

The Thames Path stays on the southern bank all the way to Caversham Lock, crossing the River Kennet on Horseshoe Bridge, which is attached to Brunel's Great Western Railway Bridge.

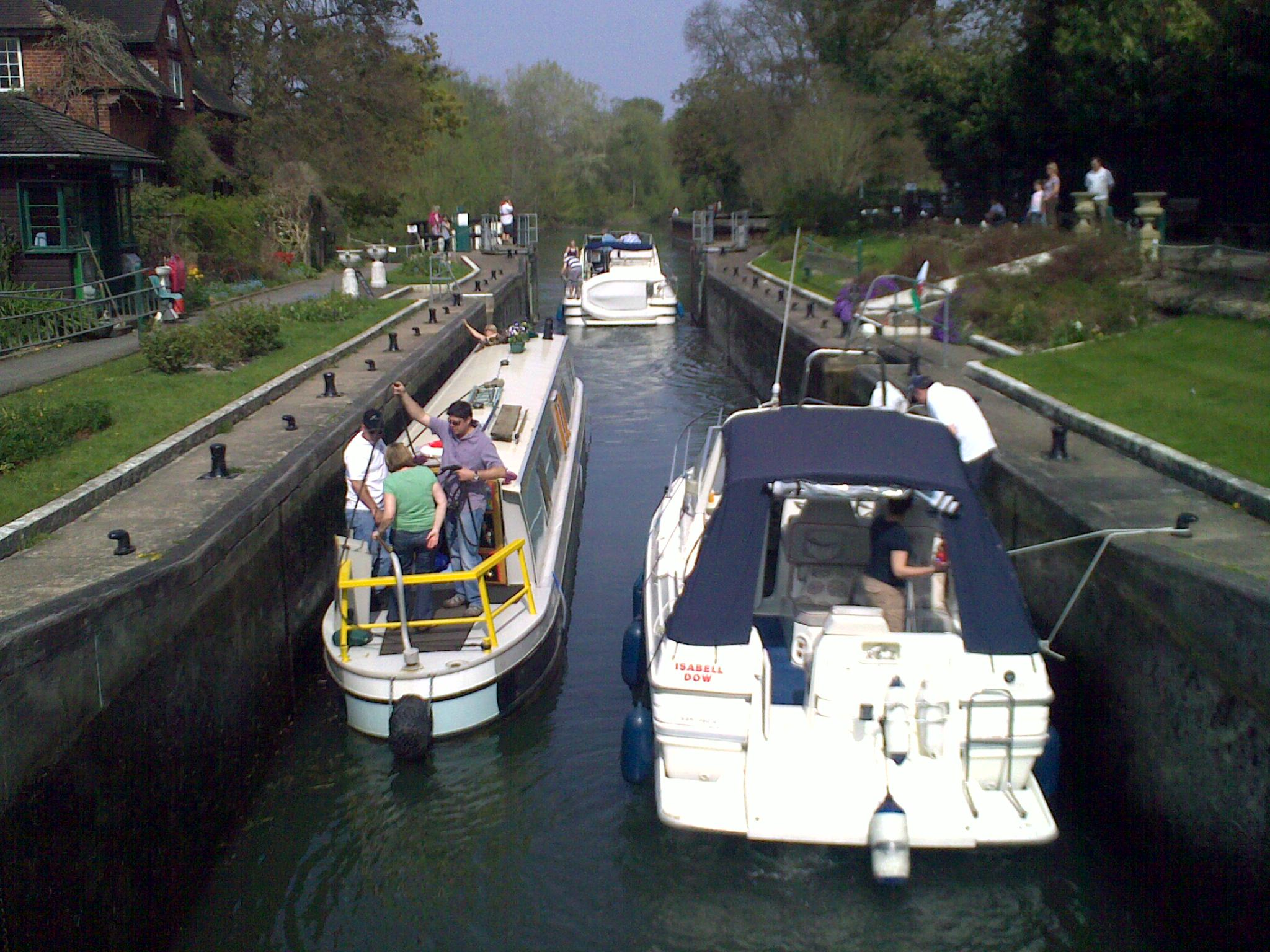
Canal boats in Sonning Lock.

== Literature and the media ==
"The floral tastes of the lock-keeper generally make Sonning Lock very bright and gay." — Charles Dickens (1882)

Is there a spot more lovely than the rest,
By art improved, by nature truly blest?
A noble river at its base running,
It is a little village known as Sonning.

— James Sadler (1845–1885), Sonning lock keeper

== See also ==
- Locks on the River Thames
- Rowing on the River Thames
- Sonning Bishop's Palace, nearby

Next lock upstream	River Thames	Next lock downstream
Caversham Lock; 4.23 km (2.63 mi)	Sonning Lock; Grid reference: SU752754	Shiplake Lock; 4.68 km (2.91 mi)
