= Playhatch =

Hamlet in Oxfordshire, England

Coordinates: 51°28′58″N 0°55′59″W

- Hamlet
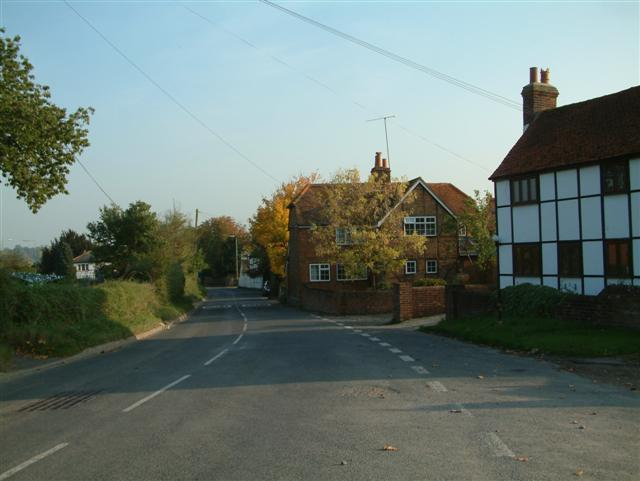
- View of the road through Playhatch

- Location within Oxfordshire
- OS grid reference: SU7476
- Civil parish: Eye & Dunsden
- District: South Oxfordshire
- Shire county: Oxfordshire
- Region: South East
- Country: England
- Sovereign state: United Kingdom
- Post town: Reading
- Postcode district: RG4
- Dialling code: 0118
- Police: Thames Valley
- Fire: Oxfordshire
- Ambulance: South Central
- UK Parliament: Henley
- Website: Eye & Dunsden Parish Council

Playhatch (or Play Hatch) is a hamlet in the civil parish of Eye & Dunsden in South Oxfordshire, England, about 2 miles (3.2 km) northeast of Reading, Berkshire. It is situated immediately north of the junction of the A4155 and the B478.

== Overview ==
Before 1866, Playhatch formed part of the Oxfordshire section of Sonning civil parish. Berry Brook starts close to the Redgrave-Pinsent Rowing Lake to the southwest, running northeast through the River Thames floodplain past Playhatch, under the B478 Playhatch Road near the Sonning Works, before joining the river at Hallsmead Ait.

== Amenities ==
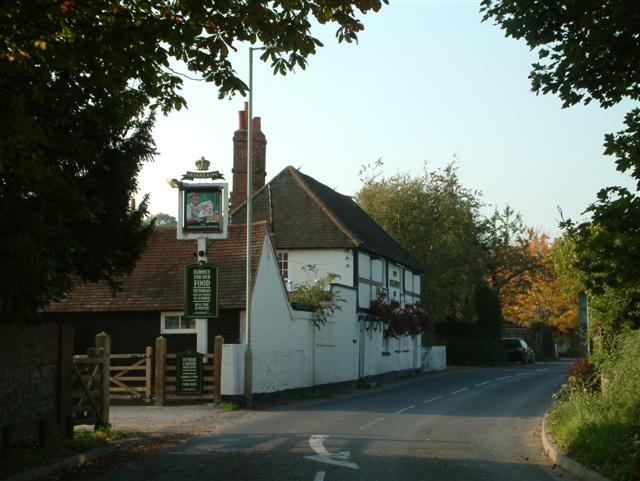
The Shoulder of Mutton public house at Playhatch.

Just south of the hamlet is the Redgrave-Pinsent Rowing Lake. The hamlet has three public houses: The Crown, a 16th-century coaching inn and a Grade II listed building, The Flowing Spring, and The Shoulder of Mutton

== See also ==
- List of places in Oxfordshire
