= The Piggott School =

Coordinates: 51.490°N 0.872°W

Location
- Twyford Road; Wargrave; Reading, Berkshire, RG10 8DS; England

Information
- Type: Academy
- Motto: Sursum Corda (Lift your hearts up) and “Go and do likewise” (Luke, 10:37)
- Religious affiliation: Church of England
- Established: 1940
- Local authority: Wokingham
- Department for Education URN: 136891 Tables
- Ofsted: Reports
- Head Teacher: Rebecca Alexander
- Gender: Mixed
- Age: 11 to 18
- Enrolment: 1,523 (296 in Sixth Form)
- Houses: Thames - Loddon - St Patrick's - Kennet
- Colour: Royal Blue
- Website: http://www.piggott.wokingham.sch.uk

The Piggott School is a Church of England academy secondary school in Wargrave in Berkshire, England. The school has approximately 1,516 pupils and around 185 teaching staff. The school specialises in Modern Languages and Humanities. It has been awarded International school status by the British Council. The most recent inspection from Ofsted achieved an overall effectiveness rating of 'Good'.

The Piggott School has a long established exchange programme with the Ville-Gymnasium School der Erftstadt, North Rhine-Westphalia, Germany, and other programmes with I.E.S. Las Canteras in Collado Villalba near Madrid, Spain, and with Lycée Jean Guéhenno, France. It is a partner school of the EU organised Comenius project. The Piggott School is also the only church of England secondary school in the Reading, Twyford area.

== History ==
The initial funding for the cost of The Piggott School was led by Vicar Canon Stephen Winter. Under the 1936 Education Act, if a community raised a quarter of the cost of a new school, the rest of the funding would be provided from public funds. The foundation stone was laid on 12 October 1939 and officially opened on 17 September 1940. The school was originally built for 320 children. When it was opened in 1940, it was already too small because war had broken out and an evacuation programme was underway (two million children were moved from London to the countryside within three days). This caused a doubling of the local population of children and far more pupils had to be accommodated by the school. Morning school was therefore organised for 'home' children. Afternoon school was for the 'visitors'.

== Recent and future changes ==
Since becoming an academy, there have been changes to the new site. In 2011, a new sixth form block was opened to replace the old sixth form block (now used as a drama studio and extra classroom). A purpose-built gym was constructed on the site of the old Maths and Business Studies terrapins.

== Houses ==
The four houses are:

St Patricks Thames Kennet Loddon

Loddon house is named after the River Loddon in Berkshire and Hampshire. The emblem is a Lion. Thames house is named after the River Thames which runs through several cities and towns, the emblem is a dragon. Kennet house is named after the River Kennet which runs through Reading, the emblem is a green dragon. St Patrick's house is named after St Patrick's Stream, a backwater of the Thames that flows into the Loddon, the emblem is a harp. The current school sweatshirt (since 2011) comes with the school house; the logo can be red for Thames, blue for St Patricks, green for Kennet, and yellow for Loddon. There are competitions between the houses, including rugby, football, netball, hockey, sports day and the governors' cup.

== Church status ==
The Piggott School is a school with a Church Foundation.

== Ofsted ==
The school is high-achieving in results, OfSTED and SIAMS inspections.

In its latest Ofsted inspection, carried out 29–30 November 2017, the school achieved the following ratings:

Overall effectiveness	Good
Effectiveness of leadership and management	Outstanding
Quality of teaching, learning and assessment	Good
Personal development, behaviour and welfare	Outstanding
Outcomes for pupils	Good
Early years provision	Good
16 to 19 study programmes	Outstanding

== Facilities ==
The Piggott School has a soldering works area, clay area, modelling areas such as DIY, an Arts Studio, and a large sports field which runs alongside the railway tracks towards Wargrave railway station. In 2011 a new sixth form block was opened. A new block, similar to that of the sixth form building, was constructed in mid 2013. This contains a mixture of Maths and science facilities and a gym.

Subject	GCSE	A level
Art and Design	Yes	Yes
Biology	Yes	Yes
Business Studies	Yes	Yes
Chemistry	Yes	Yes
Child Development	-	-
Computer Science	Yes	Yes
Design and Technology	Yes	Yes
Drama	Yes	Yes
Economics	-	Yes
English Language	Yes	Yes
English Literature	Yes	Yes
French	Yes	Yes
Further Mathematics	Yes (Level 2)	Yes
Geography	Yes	Yes
German	Yes	Yes
Government & Politics
History	Yes	Yes
Computer Science	Yes	Yes
Mathematics	Yes	Yes
Media Studies	Yes	Yes
Music	Yes	Yes
Psychology		
Physical Education	Yes	Yes
Physics	Yes	Yes
Religious Education	Yes	Yes
Science (double award)	Yes	-
Statistics	Yes	-

== Curriculum ==
In Years 7 and 8 (Key Stage 3) students study the core subjects of English, Mathematics and Science (Year 9 start GCSE Science) plus the following foundation subjects: French, Design and Technology, Information and Communication Technology (ICT), History, Geography, Religious Education, Art, Music, Drama and Physical Education. Lessons are offered in Personal, Social and Health Education and Citizenship. In addition to French, pupils either study German, Spanish or Mandarin Chinese as a second language. The following Design and Technology options are offered at GCSE: Food and Nutrition; Graphic Products; Resistant Materials; Systems and Control; Textiles.

AS Art, Craft and Design is also available as a fast track course for students in year 10 and 11. In Years 9, 10 and 11 students are able to specialise in Catering, Graphic Products, Textiles, Resistant Materials, Electronic Products or Food. Sixth formers can study the following courses in AS & A2 are food technology, AQA theatre studies, music, AQA geography, OCR history, AQA maths and languages (French, Spanish or German). Students can also study at AS and A level which are ICT, product design (graphic products or textile technology), economics, science (students are able to take one or more of the three separate sciences, these are biology, physics, chemistry), business studies, art and photography.

In addition, a number of vocational courses are available including the new Key Skills Qualifications in Application of Number, Communication, and Information Technology, and the National Diploma in Business (Level 2). The Piggott School's participates in the Cisco Networking Academy Programme and is one of the relatively few schools in the UK to offer this globally accepted professional course in networking. Pupils on this course have networked the computers in the school's IT suite and also those of the neighbouring primary school Robert Piggott Junior in Wargrave, Berkshire.

The Piggott School's has pioneered a science buddy scheme, which was featured on Teachernet. The scheme involved around 30 pupils from the top three sets in Year 11 helping the younger children in Year 7 to conduct experiments and investigations in a lunchtime club.

== Sports ==
Pupils at the school participate in the following sports: cross-country, badminton, basketball, cricket, football, health-related fitness, hockey, netball, rounders, rugby, athletics, table tennis and tennis. There are school teams which play regular fixtures with other local schools in rugby, football, hockey, netball and basketball. Pupils also participate in the Reading Cross Country League. A number of pupils play at county level.

== Admission ==
In common with all other schools in Wokingham Borough, school places are allocated by the LEA based on designated catchment areas and feeder primary schools. Around 200 places are available at Piggott every year. The feeder primary schools for Piggott are:

- Colleton Primary School
- Crazies Hill CofE Primary School
- Polehampton CofE Junior School
- Robert Piggott CofE Junior School
- Sonning CofE Primary School
- Knowl Hill CofE Primary School
- Charvil Piggott Primary School

Note: St. Johns C of E Aided Primary School is no longer a feeder school for the Piggott School.

== Academy ==
On Friday 1 July 2011, The Piggott School became an academy after being approved by the Department of Education. The letter sent out to parents saying the school would become an academy on 1 July was sent out on Monday, 4 July.

== Primary school ==
In 2013 it was announced that the Piggott school will be opening a primary school in Charvil. This has now been opened and named Charvil Piggott Primary.

== Controversy ==
In 2015, 57 year old teacher Mark Betram Wade, (Head of 6th form maths) was fired by the school following allegations of an inappropriate relationship and a harassment case with a 6th form female student from 2013 to 2015. In August 2016, he was banned from teaching for life by the National College for Teaching and Leadership after their investigation concluded that he had consensual sex with a female former student, and had engaged in an inappropriate relationship with her, which included kissing while she was still a student, and offering to be her “Sugar daddy” towards the end of the relationship. The entire case can be found here.

In 2017 the school gained national attention after outlining a range of cost-cutting measures intended to achieve savings of £200,000. These included staff redundancies, phasing out of some subjects, and increasing fees for school trips.
