= Jamie Waller =

Jamie Waller may refer to:

- Jamie Waller (basketball)
- Jamie Waller (entrepreneur)

== See also ==
- James Waller, Holocaust and genocide studies professor
