= Sonning Regatta =

Rowing regatta in Sonning, England

Coordinates: 51.47128°N 0.92140°W

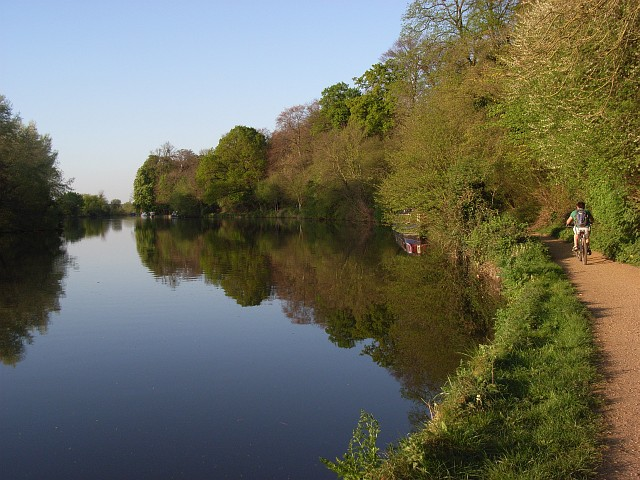
The River Thames near Sonning

Sonning Regatta is the regatta of the village of Sonning in Berkshire and the hamlet of Sonning Eye in Oxfordshire, England, on the north and south banks of the River Thames. It is a part of the Sonning Festival.

== History ==
The original Regatta started in Victorian/Edwardian times but was interrupted by World War II. The last regatta was held in front of the then White Hart pub (now the Great House at Sonning) next to Sonning Bridge, on 2 September 1939.

The regatta was re-established in 2000 as part of the millennium celebrations and has subsequently been held every two years. It takes place on the Oxfordshire bank of the River Thames above Sonning Lock near the Redgrave Pinsent Rowing Lake. It is normally held on the Saturday of the bank holiday weekend at the end of May. There are a number of categories of race for both adults and children including canoes, dinghies, skiffs, etc. A particular feature is the dongola racing.

Sonning Regatta is held on even years.

== See also ==
- Henley Royal Regatta
- Reading Town Regatta
- Wargrave & Shiplake Regatta
- Sonning Works

== Bibliography ==
- Perkins, Angela (1999). The Book of Sonning (2nd ed.). Buckingham: Baron Books. ISBN 0-86023-659-5.
