= Reading Amateur Regatta =

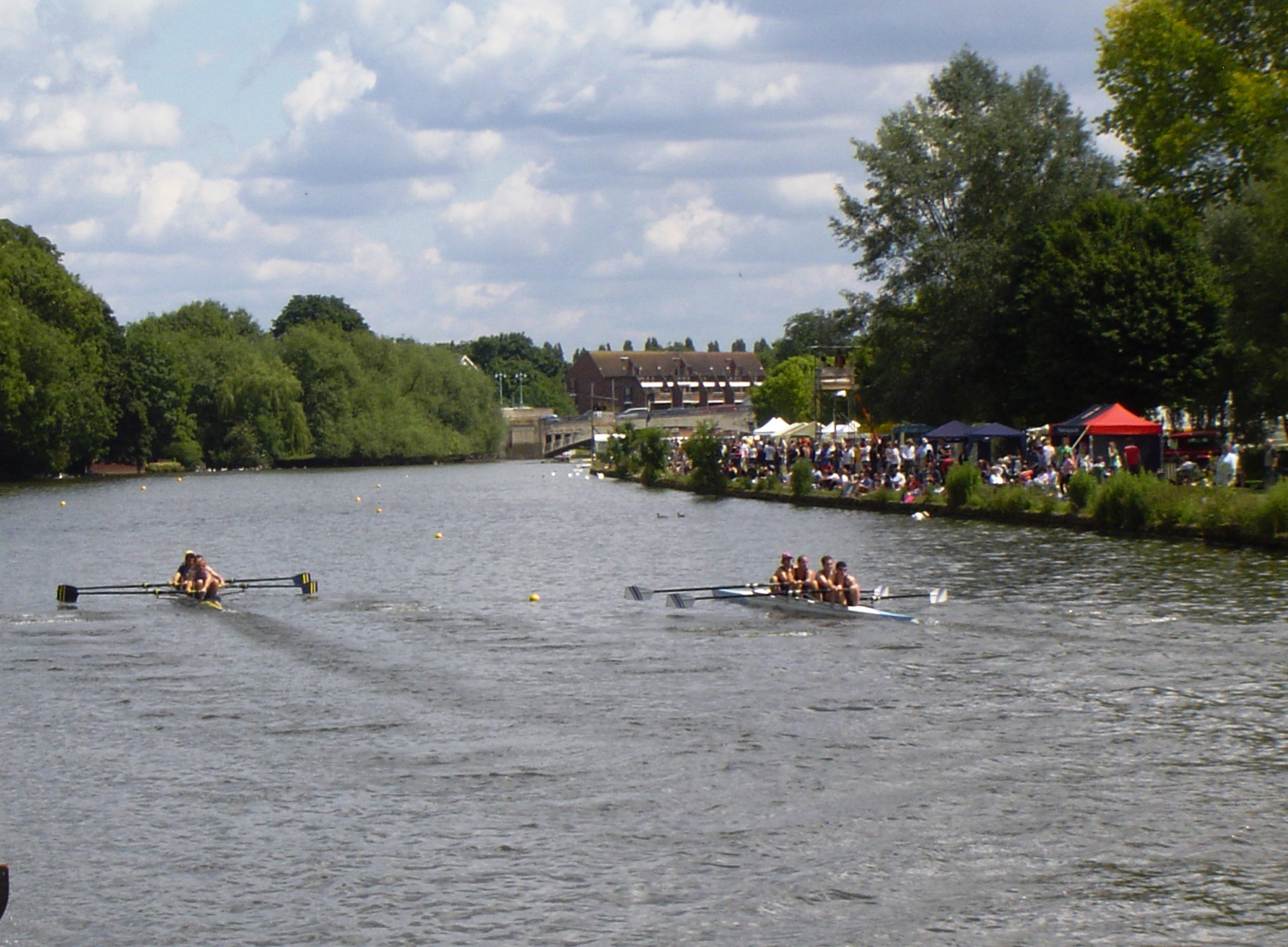
Crews at the finish at Reading Amateur Regatta

Reading Amateur Regatta is a rowing regatta, on the River Thames in England which takes place at Reading, Berkshire on the reach above Caversham Lock.

The regatta takes place in June and attracts top crews from around the UK. Racing takes place on the 1500-metres downstream course that stretches from St Mary's Island until just short of Reading Rowing Club clubhouse. The regatta takes place on Saturday and Sunday in June and its importance stems from its date, being immediately before entries close for Henley Royal Regatta.

Reading Amateur Regatta was established in 1842 although it had a chequered history until the 1870s, when Reading Rowing Club was founded and revived interest in it. Its re-establishment was also encouraged by the founding of the Reading Working Men's Regatta on the lower lock reach above Sonning Lock in 1877.

Another hiatus occurred after World War I, but thenceforth the regatta grew from strength to strength requiring various adaptations to accommodate the entry level. This resulted in a review in 1999 which saw two-lane racing reintroduced on a 1500 metres course by changing from launch to bank umpiring. An ironical conclusion perhaps as in 1844 a ferryman had spent four months in Reading Gaol for attacking an umpire and tipping him into the river with a punt pole in retaliation for disqualification in the previous year's regatta.

== See also ==
- Reading Town Regatta
- Rowing on the River Thames
