= Sonning Works =

Gravel works in Oxfordshire, England

Coordinates: 51°28′42″N 0°55′37″W

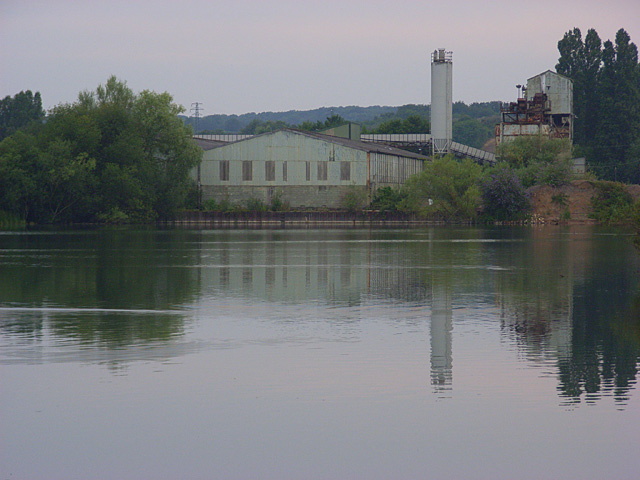
View of the Sonning Works, owned by Lafarge.

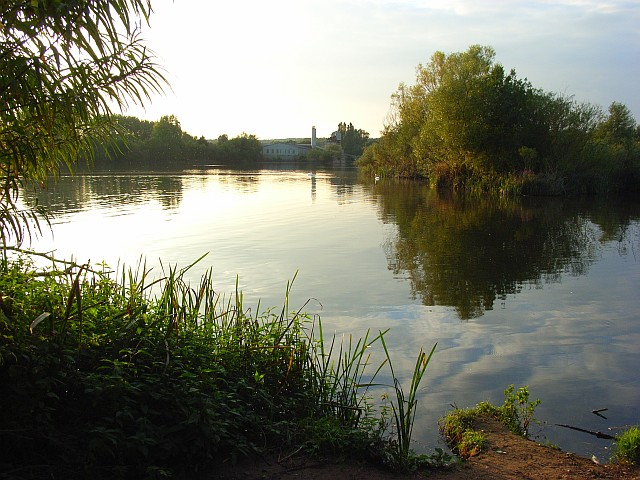
Former gravel pits, now a set of artificial lakes known as Caversham Lakes, with the Sonning Works in the distance.

The Sonning Works are a gravel works owned by Lafarge, located near Sonning Eye, Oxfordshire, England.

== Overview ==
The gravel works is positioned on the south side of the B478 Playhatch Road between Playhatch to the west and Sonning Eye on the River Thames to the east. To the west and north is Berry Brook, which joins the River Thames at Hallsmead Ait to the northeast.

Gravel has been extracted from the River Thames floodplain between Caversham, a suburb of Reading, and Sonning Eye for much of the second half of the 20th century. The facility was previously owned by Redland plc before it was taken over by the French firm Lafarge in the late 1990s. The gravel pits are permanently flooded as a set of artificial lakes known as Caversham Lakes.

== Sports ==
To the southwest is the Redgrave-Pinsent Rowing Lake, formed from former gravel pits extracted by the works in the past. Also located here are facilities for sailing at Reading Sailing Club and waterskiing. Princess Margaret and her husband Lord Snowdon waterskied here during the 1960s. In addition, there is fishing in the artificial lake.

Sonning Regatta is held every two years on the river here near the sailing club or on the lake if the weather is bad.
