= The Lynch =

Island in the River Thames, England

Coordinates: 51.4939°N 0.8941°W

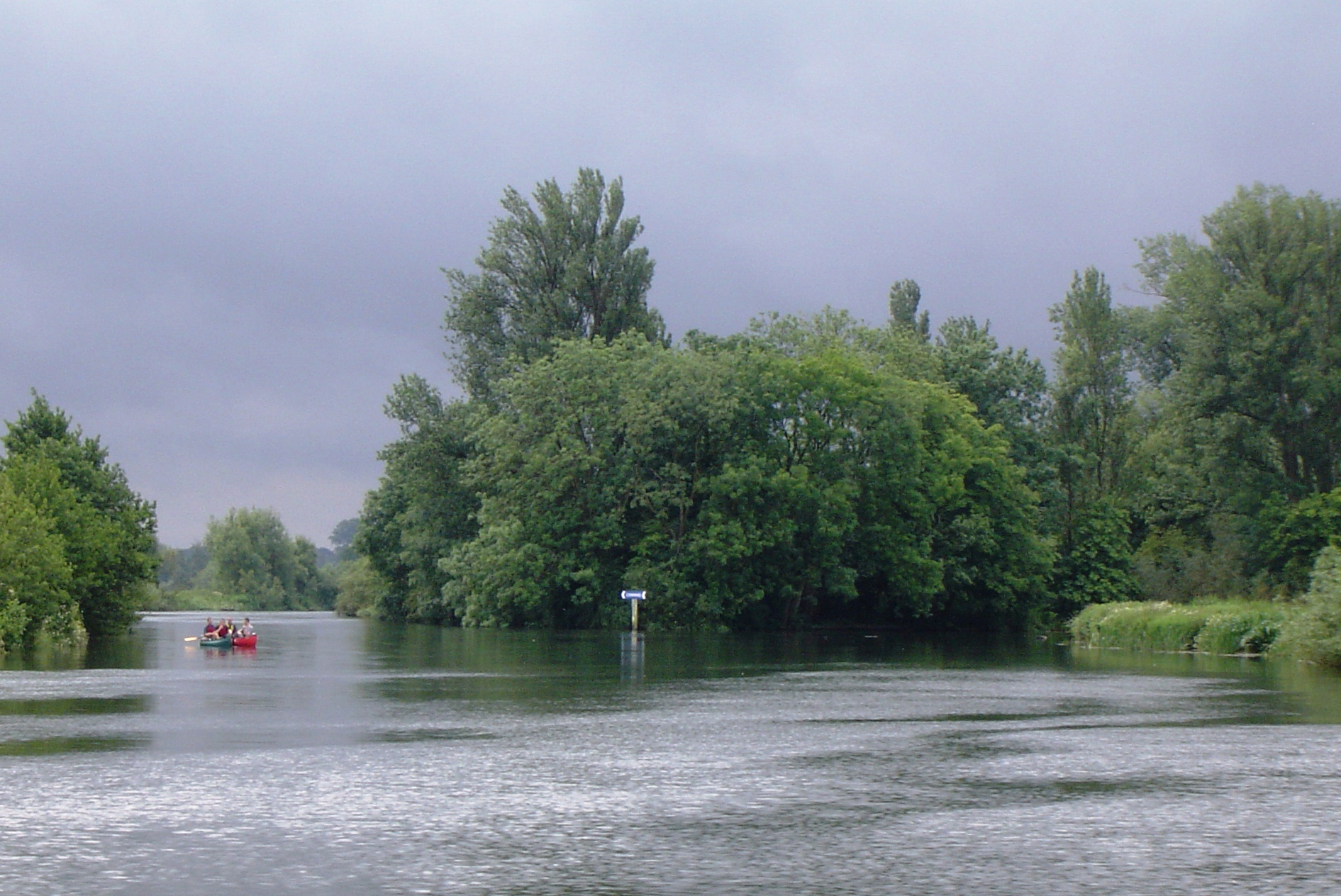
The Lynch from downstream.

The Lynch is an island in the River Thames in Berkshire, England. It is on the reach above Shiplake Lock near Lower Shiplake.

The island is large and triangular shaped, forming a pair with the similar Hallsmead Ait. It is uninhabited and tree covered and provides mooring on both sides in the back channel. Although the island is positioned towards the Oxfordshire bank of the river, it is actually in Berkshire.

== See also ==
- Islands in the River Thames

Next island upstream	River Thames	Next island downstream
Hallsmead Ait	The Lynch	Phillimore Island
