= Reading Rowing Club =

British rowing club

Coordinates: 51°27′58.71″N 0°58′44.69″W

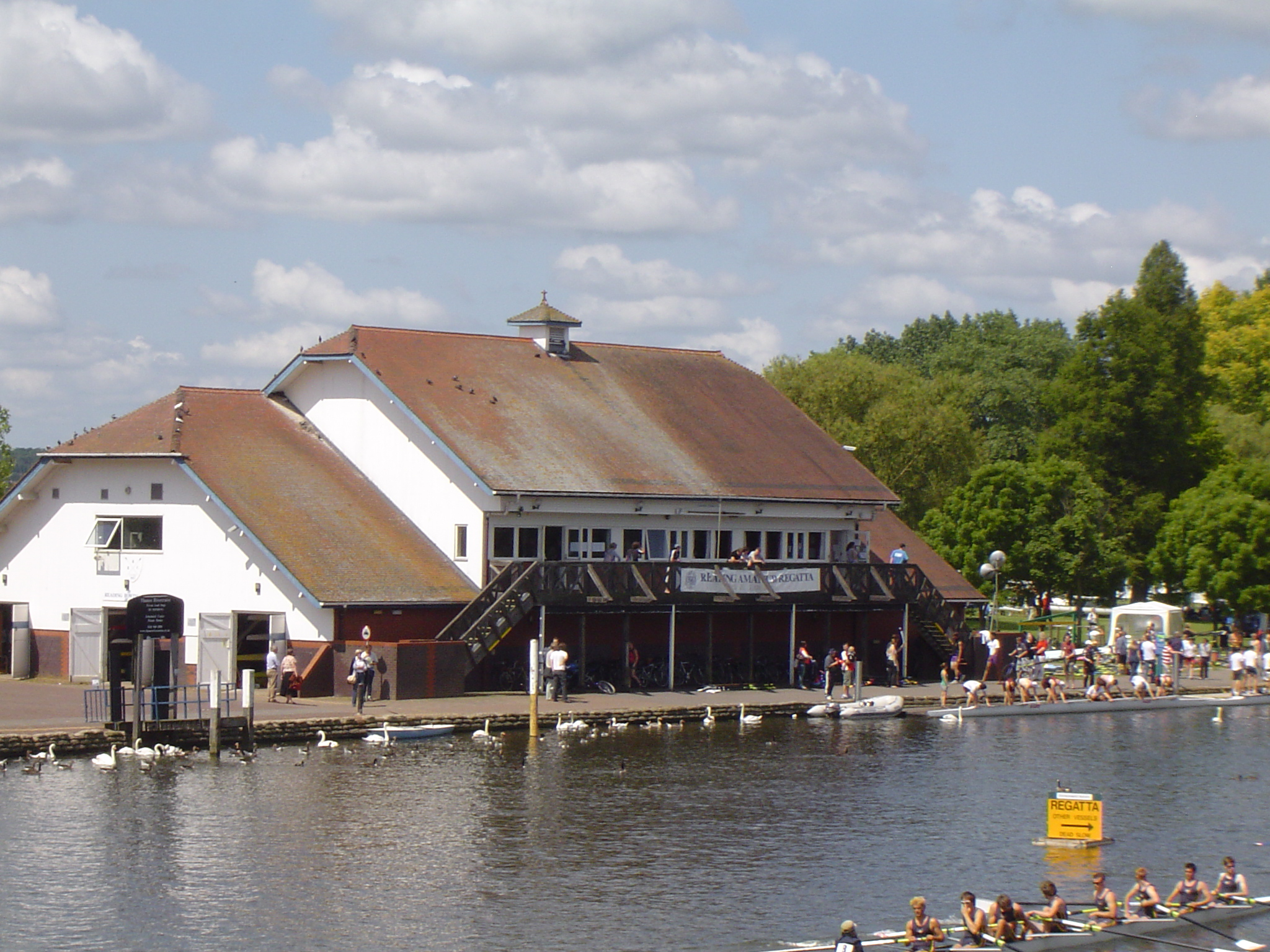

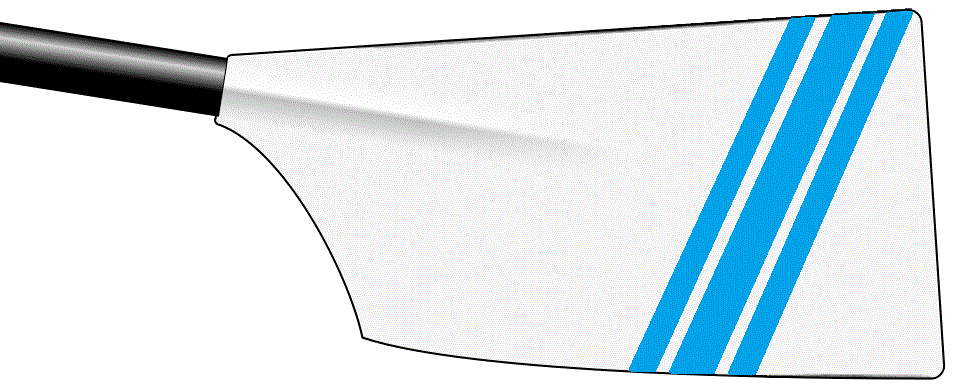
- Location: Reading, Berkshire, England
- Home water: Caversham Lock, River Thames
- Founded: 1867
- Affiliations: British Rowing boat code - RDG
- Website: www.readingrc.com

Events
- Reading Amateur Regatta, Reading Small Boats Head

Reading Rowing Club is a rowing club, on the River Thames in England, on the Berkshire bank at Reading close to the town centre just above Caversham Bridge, the westerly bridge in the town on the reach above Caversham Lock.

== History ==
The club was founded in 1867 at Reading where there had been an interest in rowing for several years. After its foundation the club revived the Reading Amateur Regatta and has been the driving force behind it ever since. The club was particularly successful at Henley Royal Regatta in the 1930s.

The Reading Head of the River Race, originally organised by Reading Rowing Club but now organised by Reading University Boat Club, has been held since 1935.

== Membership and activities ==
The only non-academic rowing club in Reading, Goring Gap Rowing Club is the nearest such club and is a semi-rival, in the west of Mapledurham, as that club take part in events for the non-racing, recreational side of the sport. Reading RC organises adult beginner coaching and provides events for the competitive and recreational sides of the sport.

The present boathouse was built in 1989 replacing a succession of earlier sites.

== Honours ==
=== Henley Royal Regatta ===
Year	Races won
1871	Town Challenge Cup
1880	Town Challenge Cup
1881	Town Challenge Cup
1882	Town Challenge Cup
1934	Wyfold Challenge Cup
1935	Wyfold Challenge Cup
2016	Princess Grace Challenge Cup

=== British champions ===
Year	Winning crew/s
1974	Men 2-
1983	Women 4x
1984	Women 1x
2001	Women J16 2x
2002	Women J15 1x
2003	Women J15 1x
2004	Women J18 4-
2005	Women J18 2-
2008	Open J14 2x
2010	Women 4+

== See also ==
- Rowing on the River Thames
