= Phillimore Island =

Island in the River Thames in Berkshire, England

Coordinates: 51°29′53″N 0°53′25″W

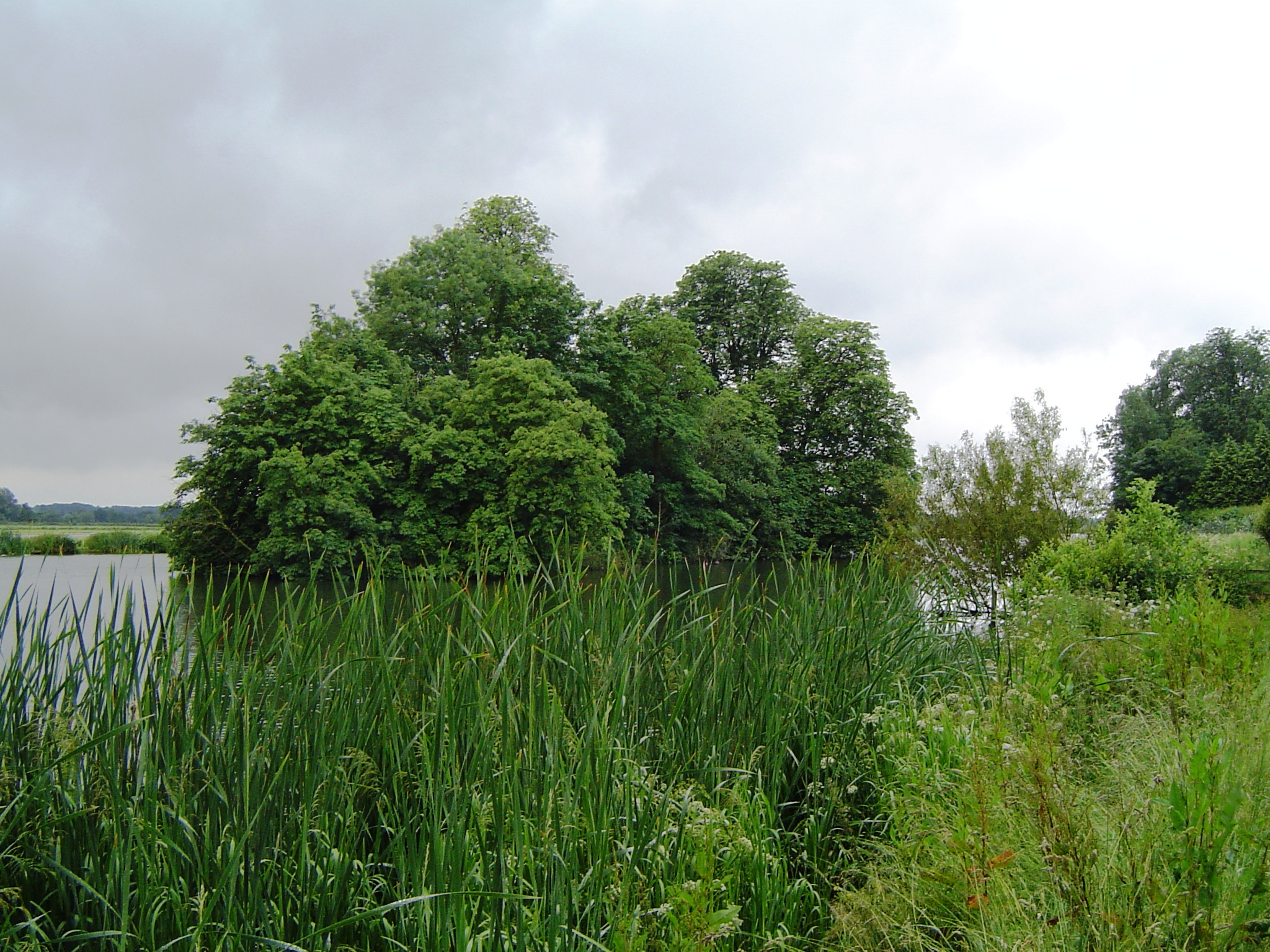
Phillimore Island from the Shiplake bank

Phillimore Island is an elongated island in the River Thames in the county of Berkshire, England, near the villages of Shiplake, Oxfordshire and Wargrave, Berkshire. It is on the reach above Shiplake Lock.

The island is named after the Phillimore family who were formerly the owners of Shiplake House, now Shiplake College, on the Oxfordshire bank.

Phillimore Island is quite centrally located in the River Thames.

== See also ==
- Islands in the River Thames

Next island upstream	River Thames	Next island downstream
The Lynch	Phillimore Island	Unnamed Eyot
