= Dongola racing =

Water sport

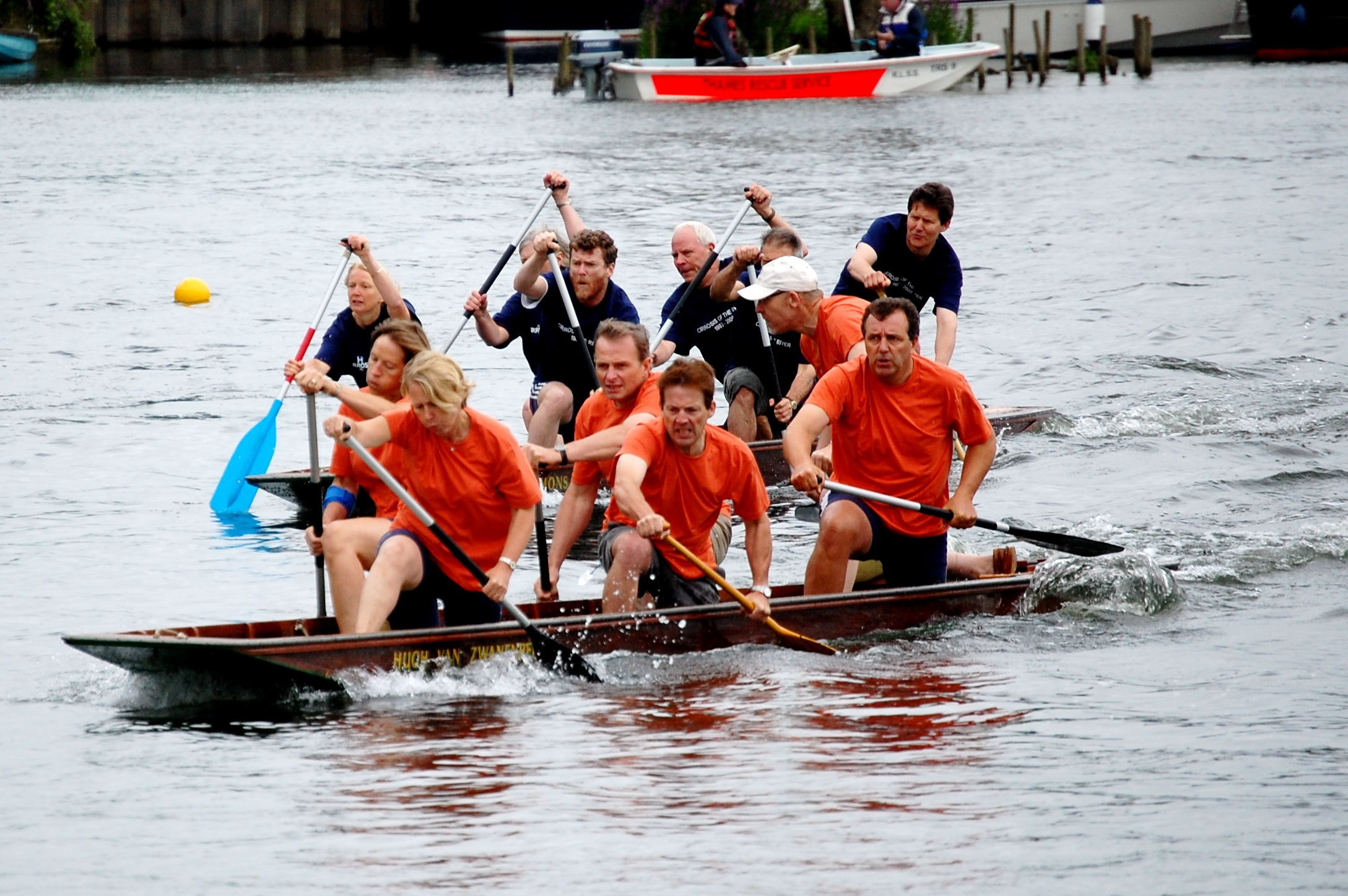
Dongola racing at the Wargrave & Shiplake Regatta on the River Thames. Note the kneeling posture and near parallel positions of the paddles.

Dongola racing is a popular event in traditional local regattas, especially on the River Thames in southern England and was first competed at Maidenhead in 1886. Competitors use wide punts and a team of (usually six) people with single-bladed paddles, facing forwards and kneeling, normally with one leg up and one leg down. The person at the rear is responsible for the steering with their paddle.

== Origins ==
Dongola racing originates from Lord Wolseley's Nile Expedition of 1884–1885 to relieve Charles George Gordon at Khartoum. Lord Wolsey offered £100 to the battalion that covered the 370 miles from Sarras to Debbeh in the fastest time. The route passed through Dongola in the northern Sudan. The Royal Irish Regiment beat the Black Watch in a close finish.

== Competitors ==
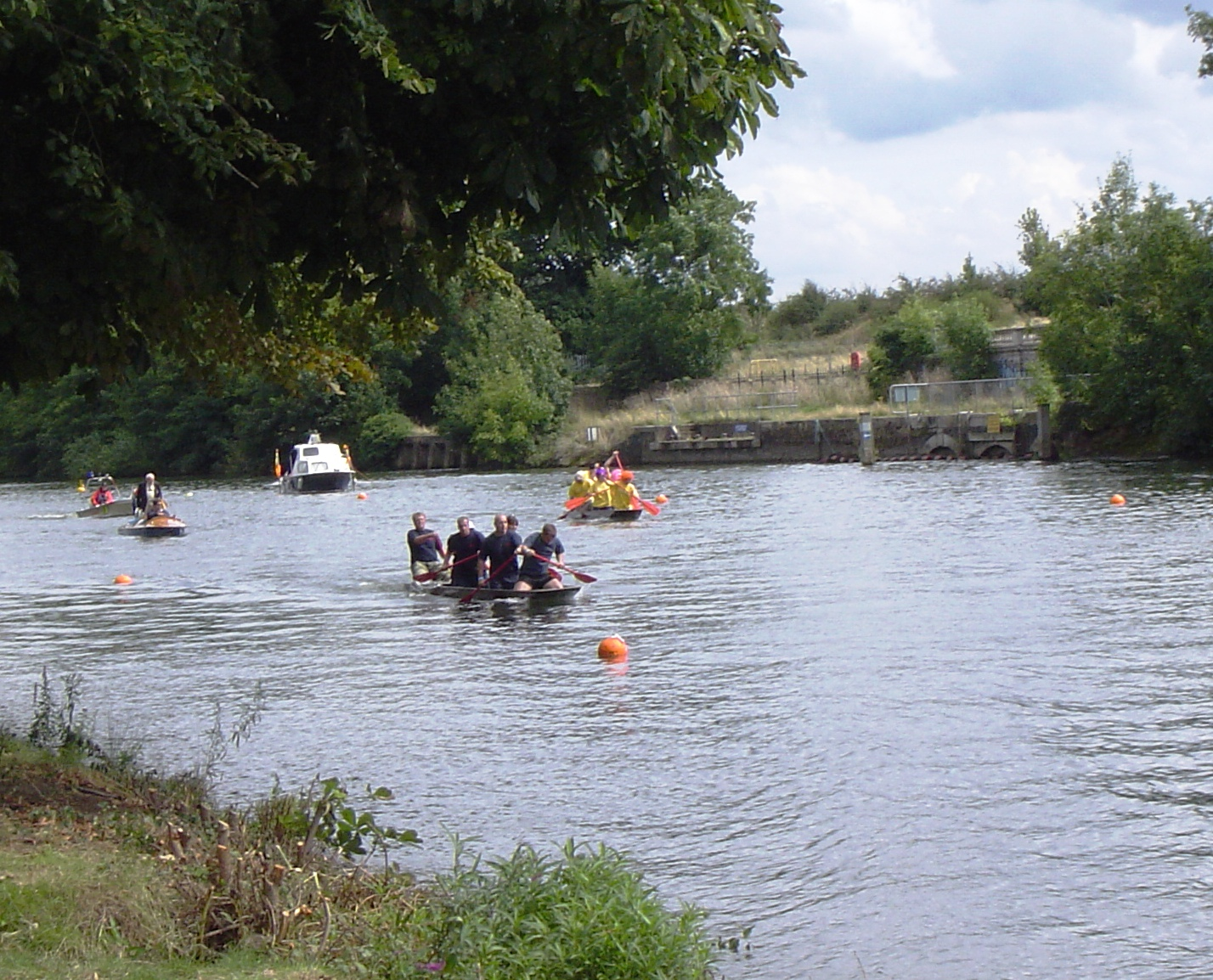
A dongola race at Sunbury Amateur Regatta. London Fire Brigade lead a team from a local children's hospice dressed as clowns.

Some competitors take the racing very seriously and practise extensively before the race and demonstrate a high level of skill. Others may turn up on the day and treat the event in a light-hearted manner and in fancy dress.

== Regattas ==
Dongola racing takes place at the following regattas:

- Cookham Regatta
- Goring and Streatley Regatta
- Sonning Regatta
- Sunbury Amateur Regatta
- Wargrave and Shiplake Regatta
- Selected Skiffing club regattas

== See also ==
- Dragon boat racing
