= Buck Ait =

Island in the River Thames, England

Coordinates: 51.4890°N 0.8972°W

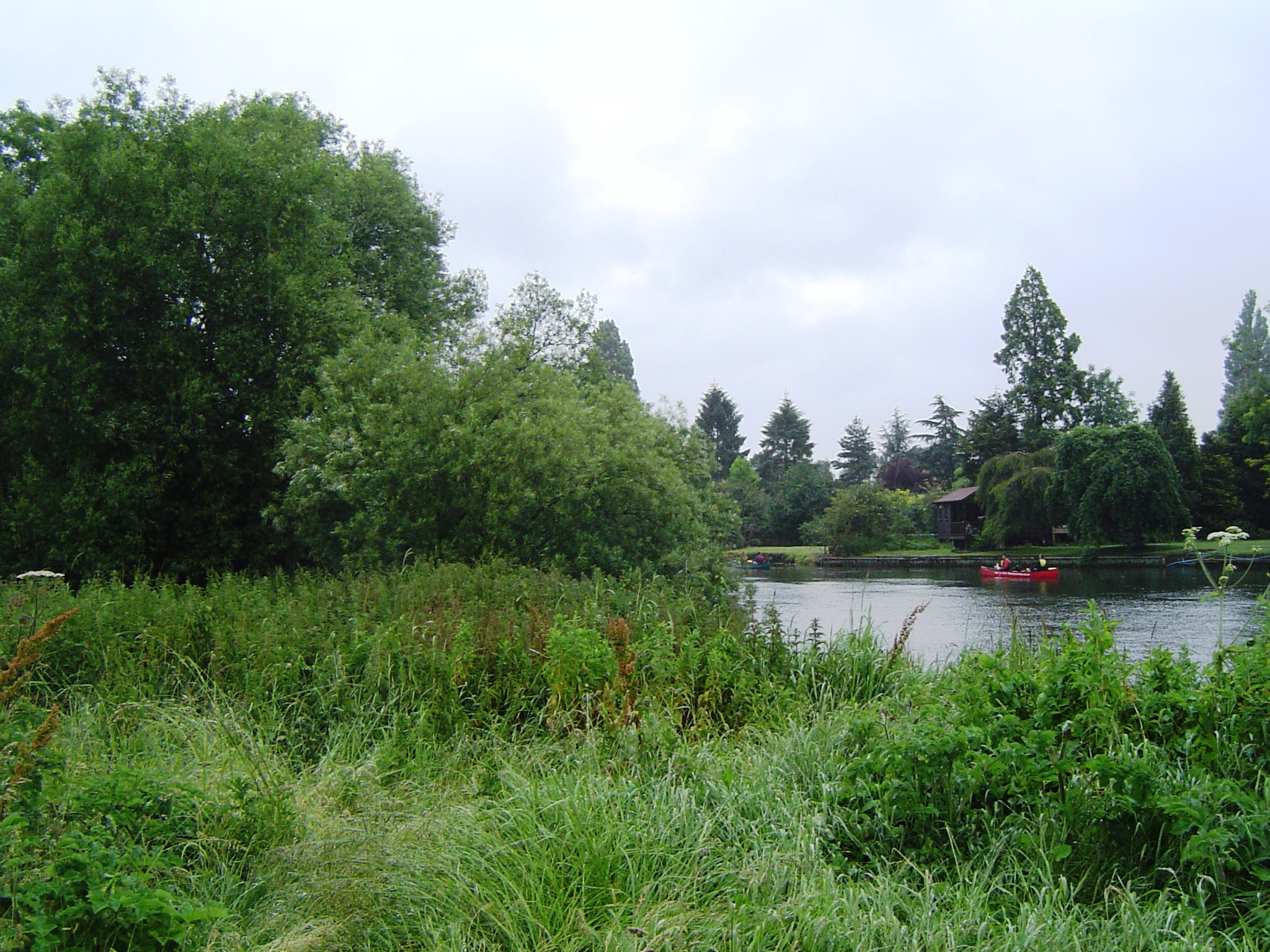
Buck Ait at the upstream end as it comes in to the bank.

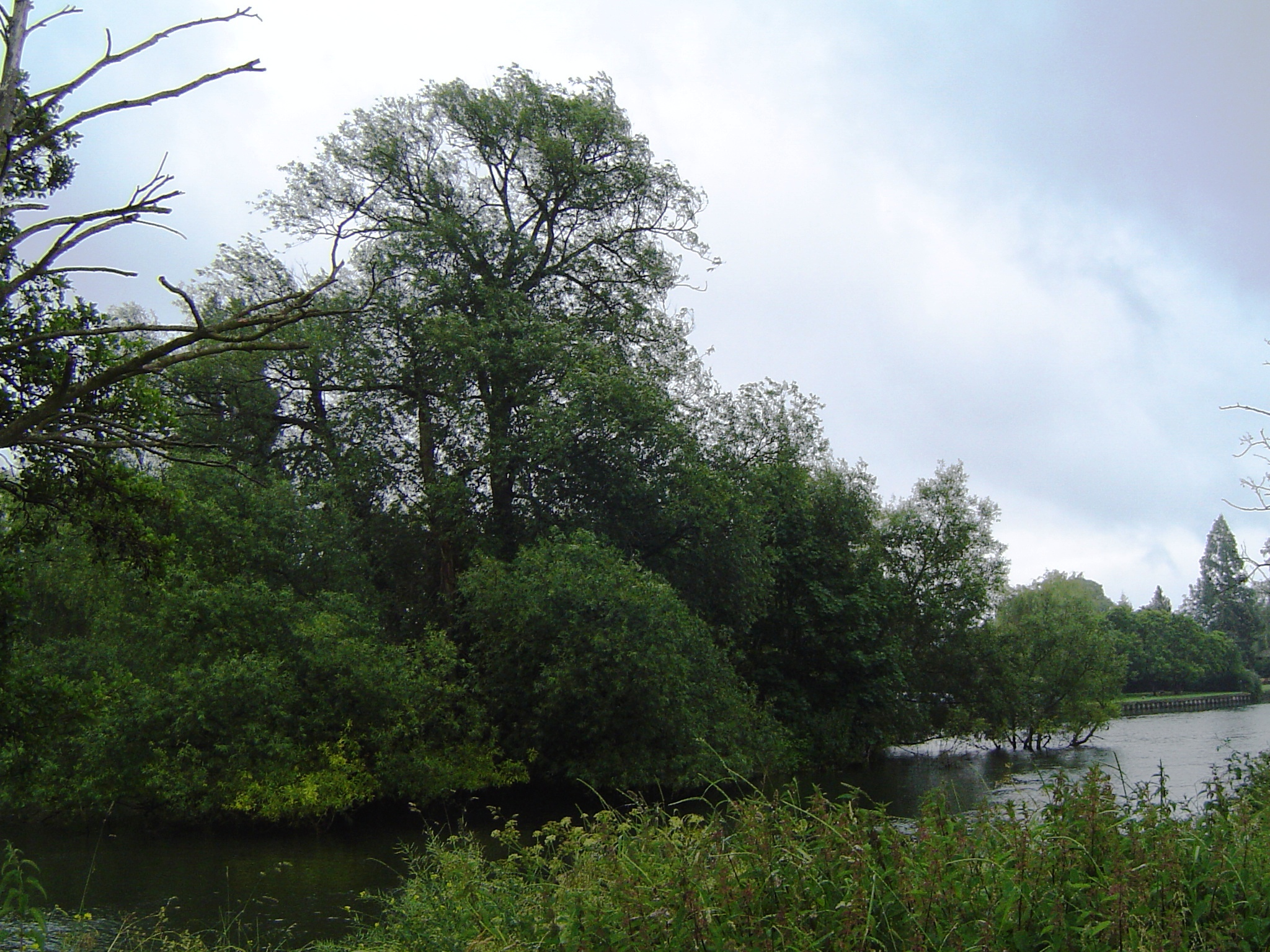
Buck Ait at the downstream end broken into islets.

Buck Ait is an island in the River Thames in Oxfordshire, England. It is on the reach above Shiplake Lock near Sonning.

The island is uninhabited and tree-covered. It lies low, acting as a water-meadow in times of flood, opposite houses with large river frontages. Its shape shows the cumulative effect of the locally curved stream, its erosion and deposition make the upstream end almost joined to the bank; the downstream end, broken into islets.

The island derives its name from the eel bucks or traps that used to be placed here. Late 19th century Thames Conservancy records state they caused considerable hindrance to navigation. Eel bucks were set in St Patrick's Stream on the bank opposite upstream also; perhaps once a tributary of the mouth of the Loddon which became a distributary of a foreshortened Loddon when water levels rose by the building of Shiplake Lock and its heightened weir.

Buck Ait is positioned towards the Oxfordshire bank of the river.

== See also ==
- Islands in the River Thames

Next island upstream	River Thames	Next island downstream
Sonning Eye	Buck Ait	Hallsmead Ait
