= Shiplake Lock =

Lock on the River Thames in Oxfordshire, England

Coordinates: 51.50102°N 0.88343°W

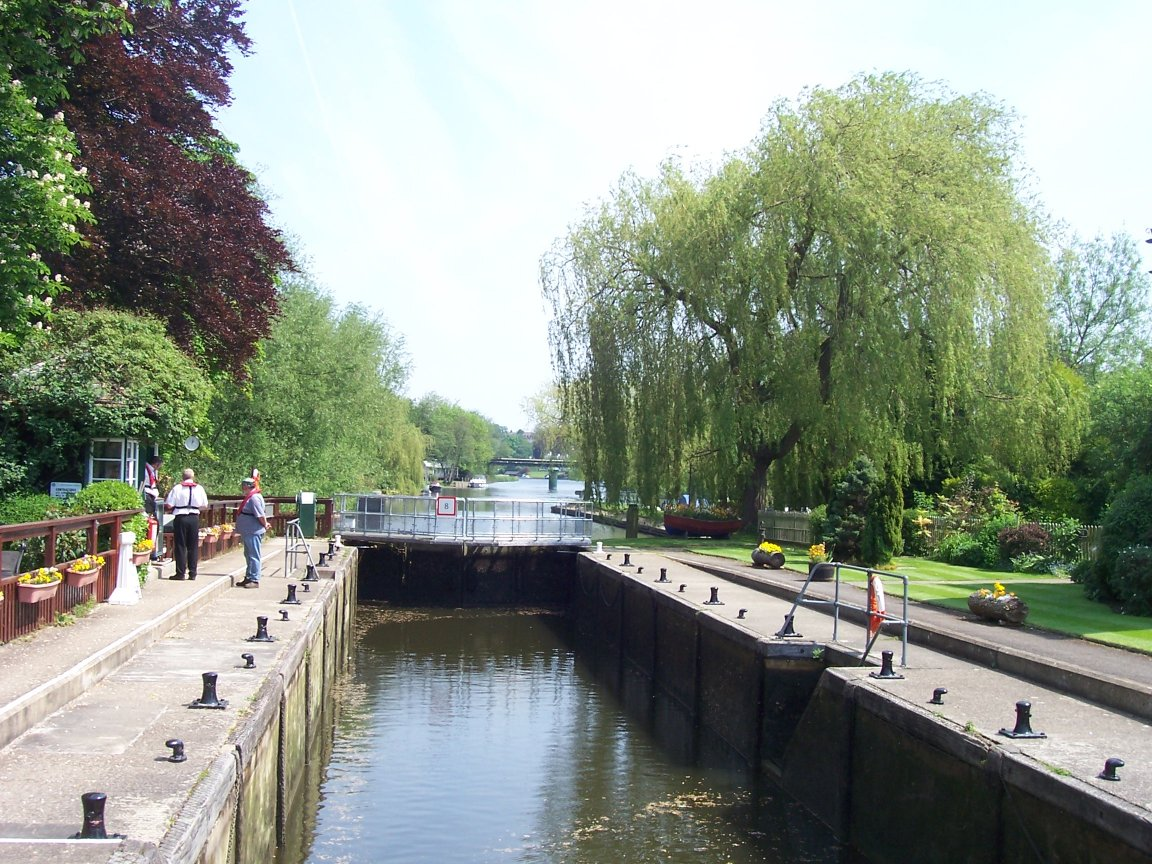
- Shiplake lock looking downstream with Shiplake Railway Bridge in the distance
- Interactive map of Shiplake Lock
- Waterway: River Thames
- County: Oxfordshire
- Maintained by: Environment Agency
- Operation: Hydraulic
- First built: 1773
- Latest built: 1874
- Length: 40.64 m (133 ft 4 in)
- Width: 5.56 m (18 ft 3 in)
- Fall: 1.55 m (5 ft 1 in)
- Above sea level: 110'
- Distance to Teddington Lock: 49 miles

Shiplake Lock is a lock and weir situated on the River Thames in England between the villages of Shiplake and Lower Shiplake, Oxfordshire. It is just above the points where the River Loddon joins the Thames and Shiplake Railway Bridge crosses the river. The first pound lock was built by the Thames Navigation Commission in 1773.

The weir is some distance upstream of the lock between the lock island and Berkshire bank.

== History ==
There is reference to the weir and flash lock at this location in the 16th century when it was known as "Cotterell's", a name which persisted after the pound lock was built. It was the second downstream of the eight locks built after the Thames and Isis Navigation Act 1750 (24 Geo. 2. c. 8), and was completed in fir wood in 1773. At this time the towpath upstream was transferred from the Berkshire to the Oxfordshire bank. The lock had to be rebuilt of oak in 1787 as the fir had decayed. There were two mills on the island at this time. The lock was rebuilt again in 1874 and the weir in 1885. The lock island was purchased by the City of London Corporation for camping in 1891, and in 1907 the ruined mills were demolished. Shiplake Lock was the first lock on the Thames to have hydraulic operation installed in 1961. During the winter of 2009/2010 the wooden lock gates were replaced with steel gates at a cost of £600,000.

== The camping island ==
The reason for the purchase of Shiplake Lock Island by the Corporation of London was to preserve the amenities for bathing and camping. It was managed by the corporation's City Lands Committee. However, managing at a distance proved a problem and the island was let in perpetuity in 1914 to the Thames Conservancy. The camp was then divided into 18 plots and run by the lock keepers.

Soon after taking over, the conservancy allowed huts to be built near the tents. The use of these was restricted to cooking and they were not to be used for sleeping. (At that time, ladies were not allowed to sleep on the island at all, but had to retire to wooden huts on the Shiplake bank).

The Thames Conservancy and its successor organisations the National Rivers Authority and Environment Agency had not been prepared to give more than a one-year lease to the plotholders. However, the community remained remarkably static with plots passing down the family line. This changed in 2022 when the Environment Agency refused to renew the leases, initially claiming it was for Health & Safety reasons but subsequently saying that the 'site had only been enjoyed by a "limited" number of people and wanted to encourage a more "inclusive approach" to allow everyone to stay'.

In December 2025, South Oxfordshire District Council issued a Certificate of Lawful Development, facilitating the use of the island for commercial camping purposes.

== Access to the lock ==
The lock can be reached from Lower Shiplake down Mill Road, and into Mill Lane, where there is a tarmac path to the lock along the edge of a field. And from the village of Shiplake, at Shiplake Church take the chalky path down to the riverbank, past Shiplake College's boathouse. The footpath at Shiplake then passes under the College (formerly Shiplake Court) and then the white Shiplake House.The lock is a few hundred metres along this part of the Thames Path.

== Reach above the lock ==
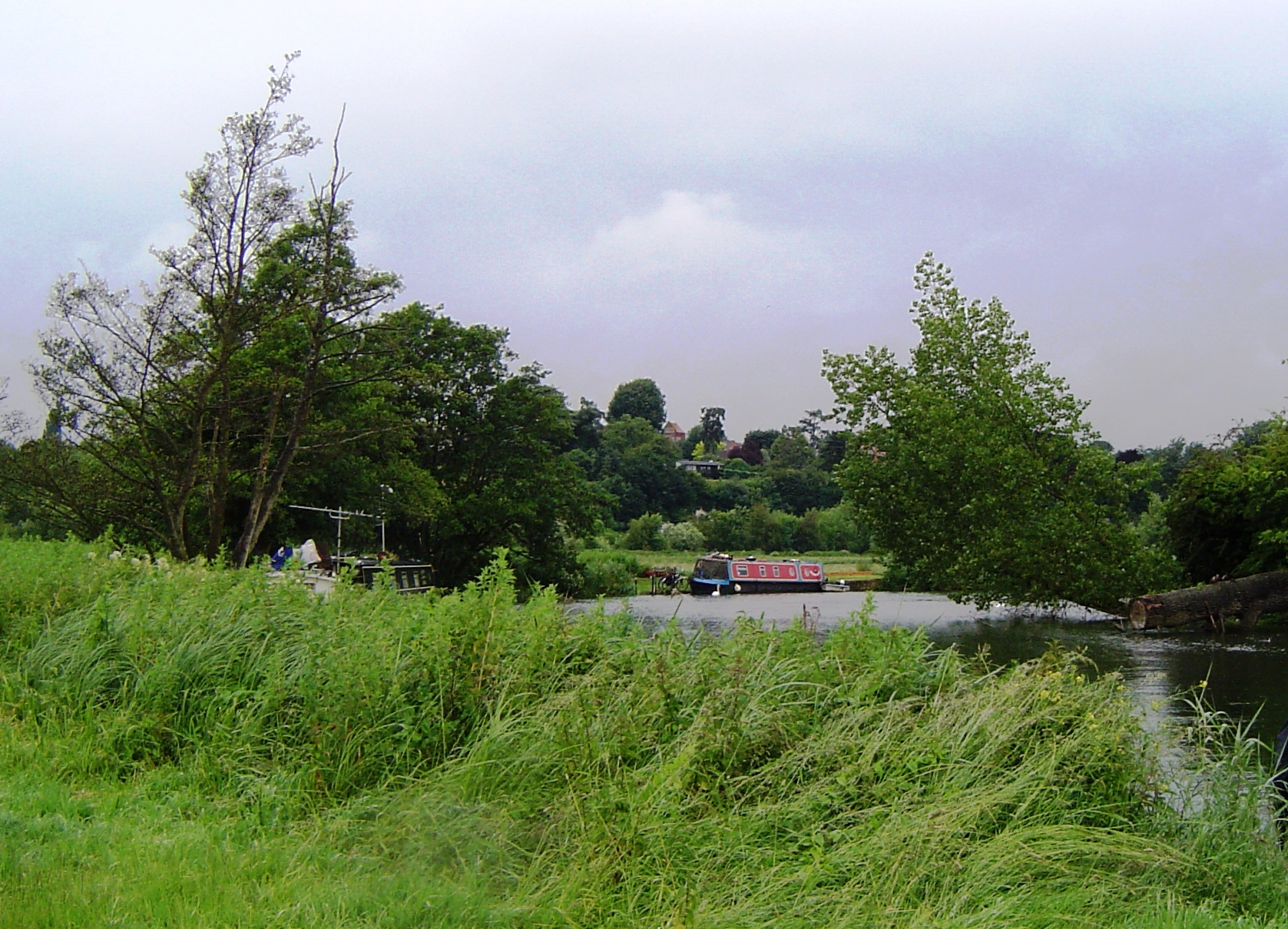
Shiplake on the hill from near The Lynch

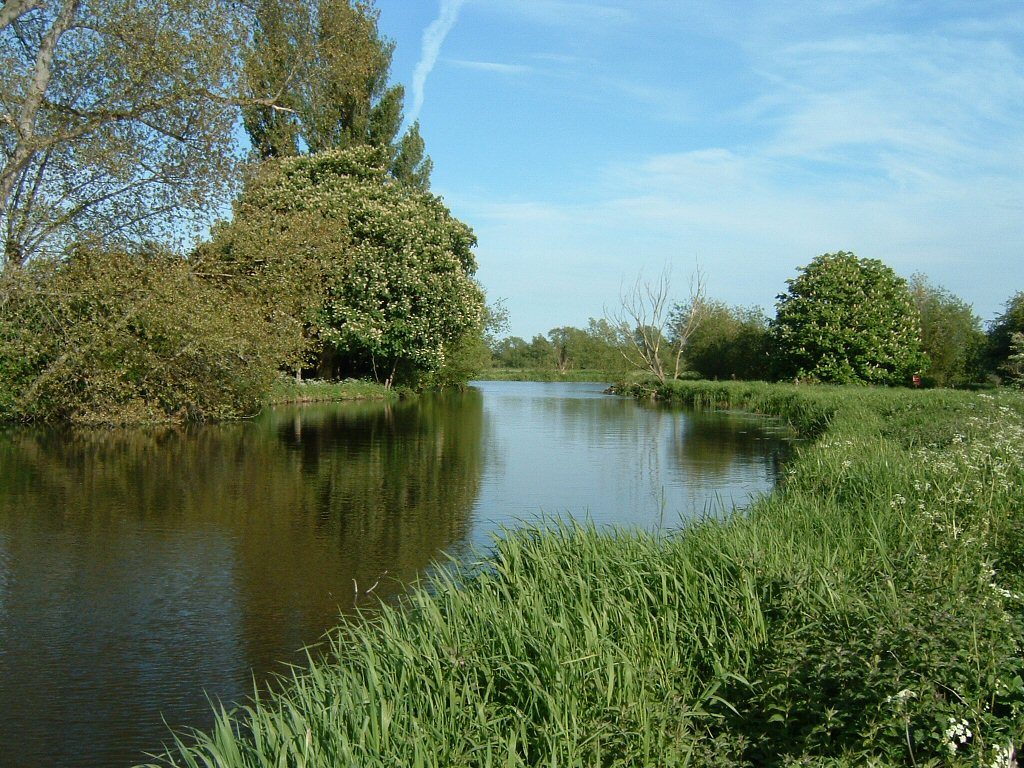
The River Thames near Sonning

The river skirts Shiplake on the Oxfordshire bank and eventually passes into Sonning. Phillimore Island is just above the lock, and on the hill on the Shiplake bank is Shiplake House and also Shiplake Court (now the premises of Shiplake College). The college boat house is on the river bank at this point. Further on there is a double bend with two large islands The Lynch, and Hallsmead Ait followed by Buck Ait. On the bank opposite the Ait is St Patrick's Stream. This stream is believed to have been a tributary stream of the River Loddon which became an outfall when the water level was raised by the building of Shiplake Lock. Apart from a small development here, the river banks are open fields to Sonning Bridge. Sonning lock is a short was upstream of the bridge, but there is a large backwater branching before the bridge on the Sonning Eye side which is crossed by Sonning Backwater Bridges.

=== Thames Path ===
The Thames Path stays on the Oxfordshire bank to Sonning, where it crosses the bridge to the other side and continues to Sonning Lock.

== Literature and the media ==
Shiplake Lock was a favourite place for fishing for the young George Orwell and his Buddicom friends.

== See also ==
- Locks on the River Thames
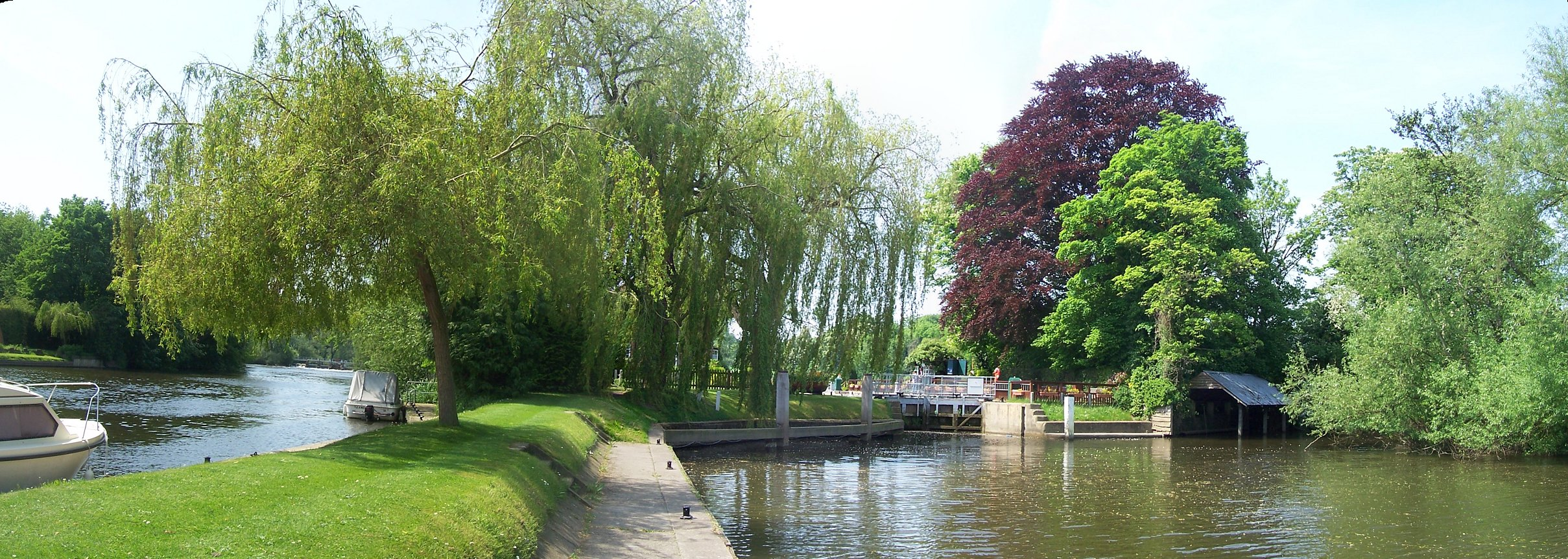
Shiplake Lock from downstream with the weir stream to the left

Next lock upstream	River Thames	Next lock downstream
Sonning Lock; 4.68 km (2.91 mi)	Shiplake Lock; Grid reference SU776786	Marsh Lock; 4.80 km (2.98 mi)
