= St Patrick's Stream =

Coordinates: 51.4923°N 0.8868°W

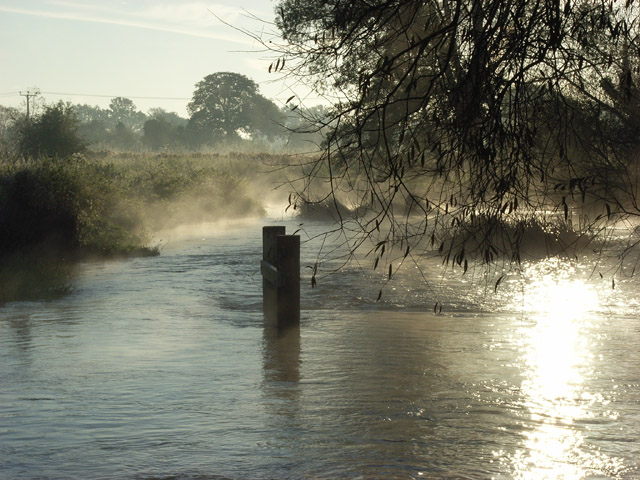
View of St Patrick's Stream.

St Patrick's Stream or Patrick Stream is a backwater of the River Thames in England, which flows into the River Loddon near Wargrave, Berkshire. It leaves the Thames on the reach above Shiplake Lock near Buck Ait, downstream of Sonning.

It is believed that the stream was originally a branch of the River Loddon that flowed into the Thames. However, when Shiplake Lock was built, the water level was raised to such an extent that it became an outfall. Evidence to support this includes a 13th-century charter stating, "Where the Lodone falls into the Thames under the park of Suninges", the contention that the stream is private and not public Thames water and the shape of the junction point which suggests a tributary rather than an outflow.

== See also ==
- Berry Brook
