= Thames and Kennet Marina =

Marina in Oxfordshire, England

Coordinates: 51°27′54″N 0°56′42″W

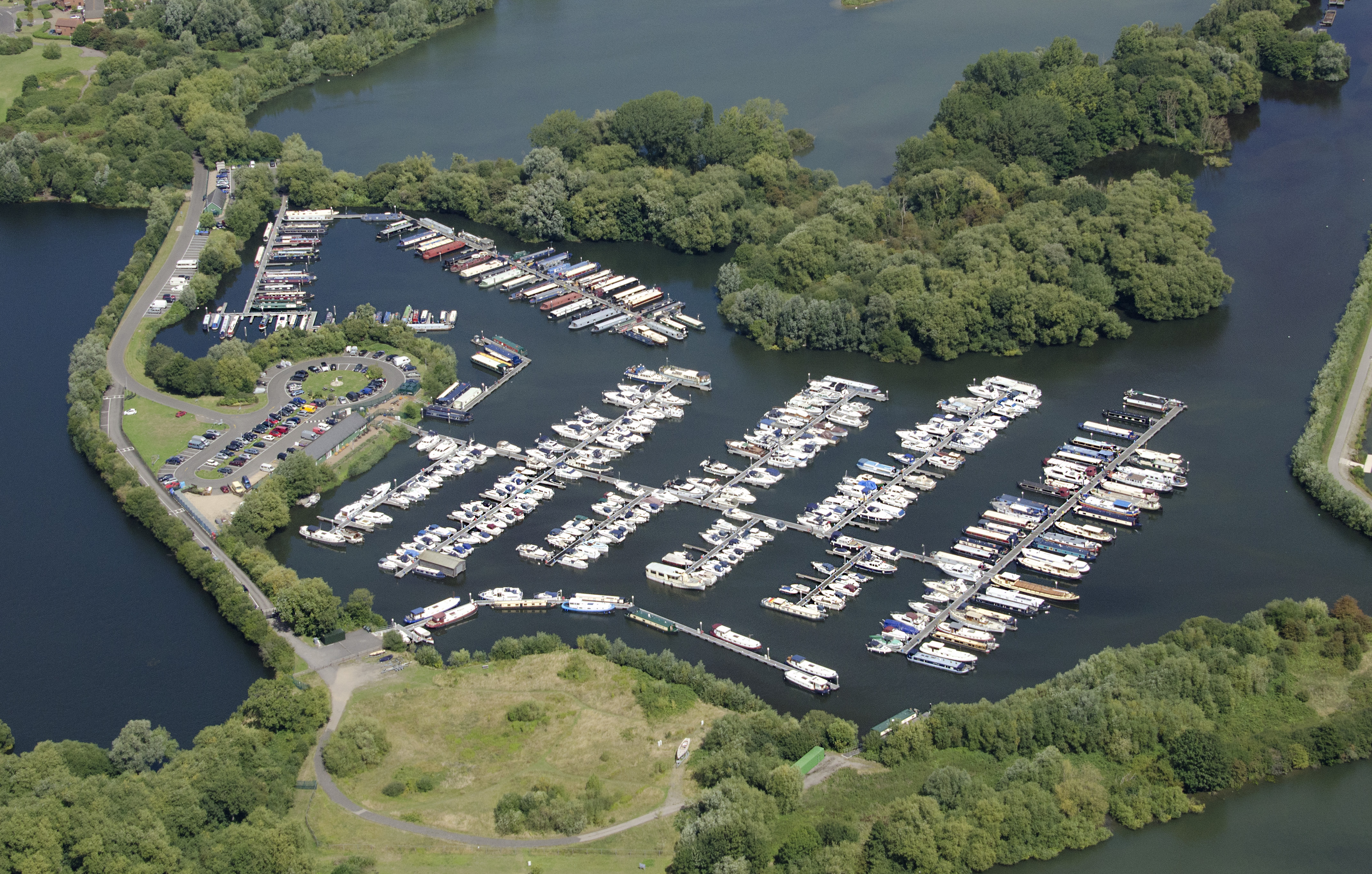
The Thames and Kennet Marina at Caversham Lakes.

The Thames and Kennet Marina is located at Caversham Lakes in south Oxfordshire, England, just north off the River Thames on the reach above Sonning Lock. It is just to the east of Caversham, a suburb in the north of Reading, Berkshire. The marina is named after the River Thames and the River Kennet which joins the Thames nearby.

The marina is in a nature reserve and is used for narrow boats and other pleasure craft for use on the river. It is owned by Tingdene Marinas Limited.

More recently, the Redgrave Pinsent Rowing Lake has been created close to the marina.
