= Berry Brook =

Stream in southern Oxfordshire, England

Coordinates: 51.48520°N 0.92270°W

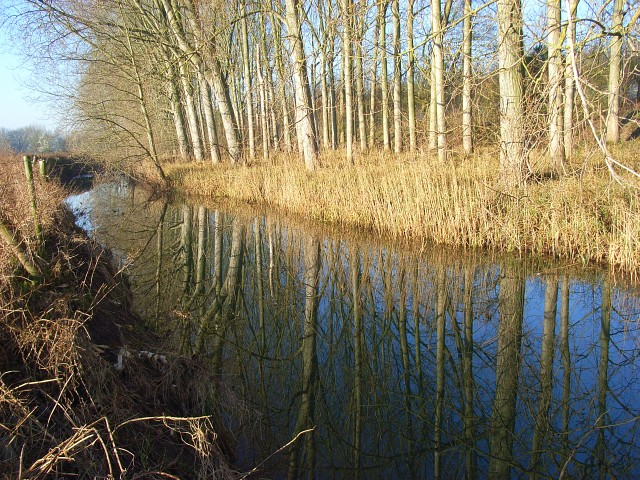
View of Berry Brook.

The Berry Brook is a stream close to Sonning Eye in the flood plain of the River Thames, in southern Oxfordshire, England.

The stream flows northeast from close to the Redgrave Pinsent Rowing Lake, parallel with the A4155 Henley Road from Caversham to Henley-on-Thames. It flows under the B478 Playhatch Road close to Playhatch and the Sonning Works owned by Lafarge. The stream passes under Spring Lane by the Flowing Spring public house, also near Playhatch. It then flows through farmland owned by Phillimore estate, entering the River Thames at Hallsmead Ait just south of Shiplake.

== See also ==
- Tributaries of the River Thames

Next confluence upstream	River Thames	Next confluence downstream
River Kennet (south)	Berry Brook	River Loddon (south)
