= Caversham Lakes =

Set of lakes in England

Coordinates: 51.467°N 0.936°W

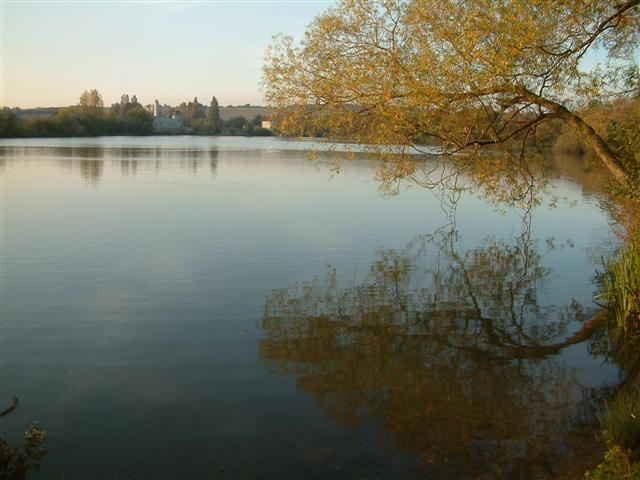
- View of Caversham Lakes

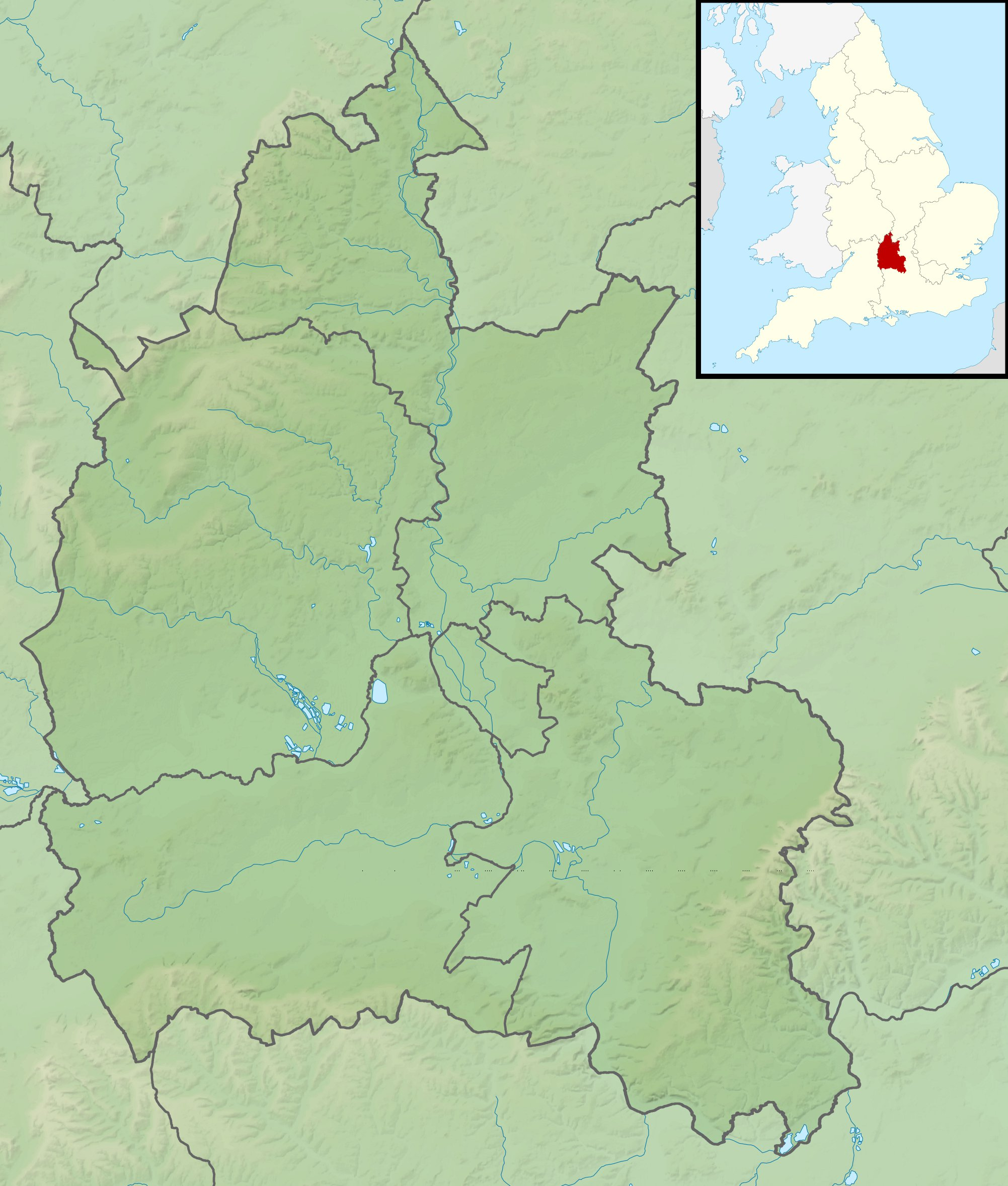
- Location within Oxfordshire Location within the United Kingdom
- Interactive map of Caversham Lakes
- Location: Caversham, Berkshire
- Type: Manmade lakes
- River sources: River Thames
- Basin countries: United Kingdom
- Managing agency: South Oxfordshire District Council
- Surface area: 32 hectares (79 acres)
- Surface elevation: 61 metres (200 ft)

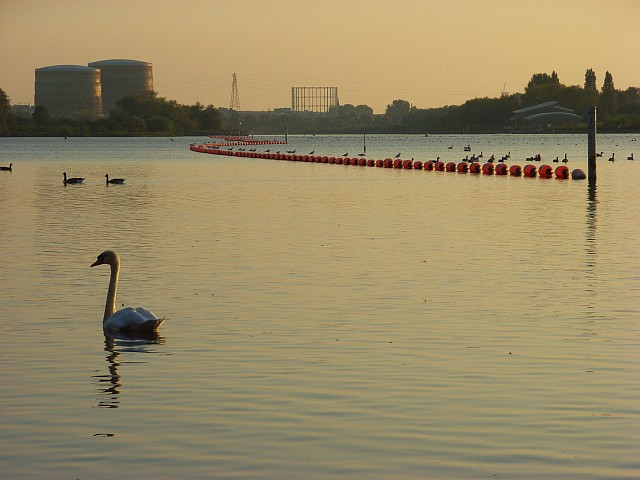
View looking towards Reading

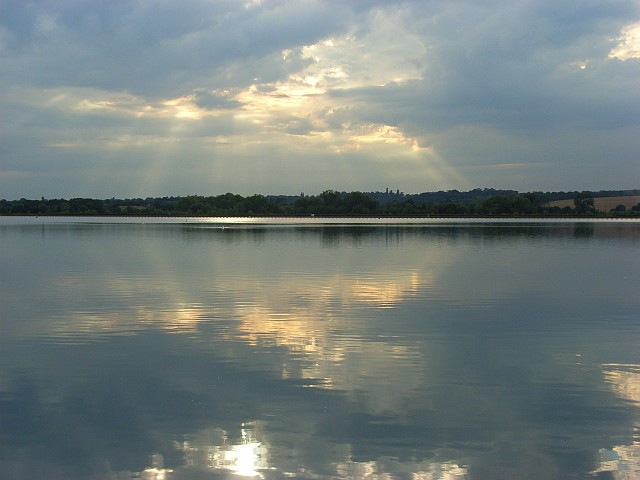
Another lake view

Caversham Lakes is a set of artificial lakes just north of the River Thames, between the suburb of Caversham and the hamlet of Sonning Eye in Oxfordshire. The Lakes were created through gravel extraction The term "Caversham Lakes" also covers the various watersports facilities alongside those lakes.

== Overview ==
The lakes are formed from former gravel pits in the floodplain of the River Thames. The company Lafarge and formerly Redland plc have undertaken the gravel extraction though the Sonning Works. Caversham Lakes Trust Ltd has been set up to administer the lakes. The road-building company Tarmac holds the freehold of the site, whilst major lessees include the Kennet and Thames Marina (operated by TingDene Marinas), the Rowing Lake, and the Environment Agency.

The Environment Agency has a base, Caversham Depot, which has three functions: it operates a Thames water-quality laboratory; a 50-ton boat lift; and a yard where a variety of boats are kept on the hard standing. Although the Caversham Lakes are obviously not historically part of the Thames waterway, both the Marina and the Caversham Depot control waters that link to the Thames.

A High Court Ruling in 2017 confirmed marinas form part of the non-tidal Thames and as such, all boats moored in marinas are required to be registered at all times. Environment Agency inspectors may issue enforcement notices and may monitor compliance.

== Sport and leisure ==
=== Watersports ===
A wide range of activities from open water swimming, stand up paddle boarding, kayaking, canoeing & aqua park was available from Caversham Lakes operating without planning permission until March 2024.

=== Rowing ===
In 2006, the Redgrave Pinsent Rowing Lake was added to the lakes in the park. The GB Rowing team use this lake as a main base at which to train. Team GB also carry out land-based training at Bisham Abbey and occasionally close to Nottingham at Holme Pierrepont National Watersports Centre.

Sonning Regatta has been held every two years since 2000 – usually on the Thames adjoining, alternatively, in bad weather, on the Redgrave Pinsent Rowing Lake.

=== Motorboating ===
The Thames and Kennet Marina in motorboating also uses an engineered lake (a marina dock) with access to the river Thames.

=== Sailing ===
The main venue in mid-Berkshire and south Oxfordshire for sailing is at Reading Sailing Club.

=== Waterskiing and wakeboarding ===
Isis Waterski Club is a committee-run members club which offers wakeboarding, wakesurfing and waterskiing. Princess Margaret and her husband Lord Snowdon waterskied here during the 1960s.

=== Angling ===
Fishing is available at no charge on the public stretches of the Thames adjoining, having obtained the relevant annual government licences. It is also available on a paid basis at a few of the lakes which are accordingly replenished with a wide variety of fish.
