= Hallsmead Ait =

Island in the River Thames, England

Coordinates: 51.4914°N 0.8954°W

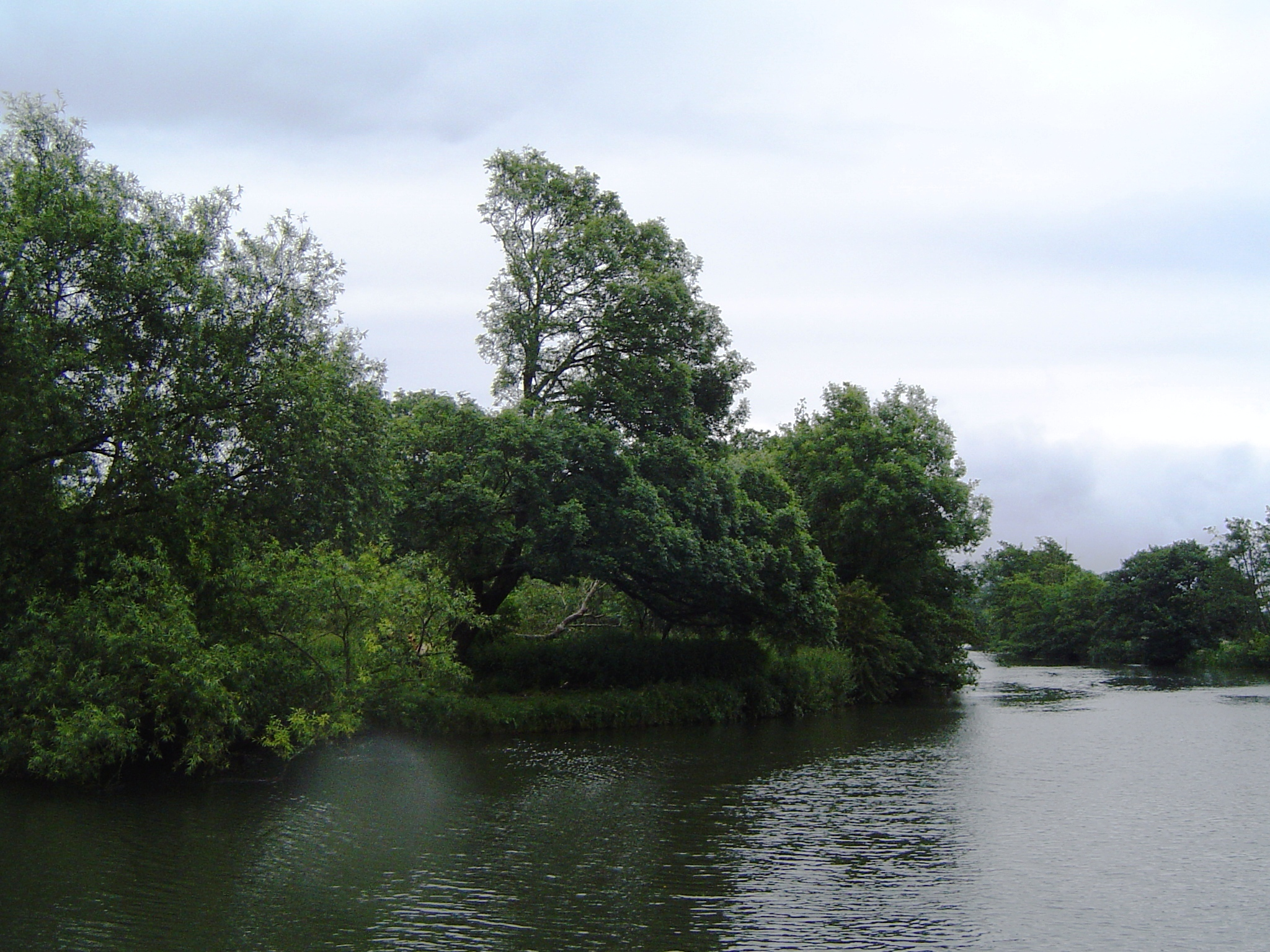
Upper end of Hallsmead Ait from the side.

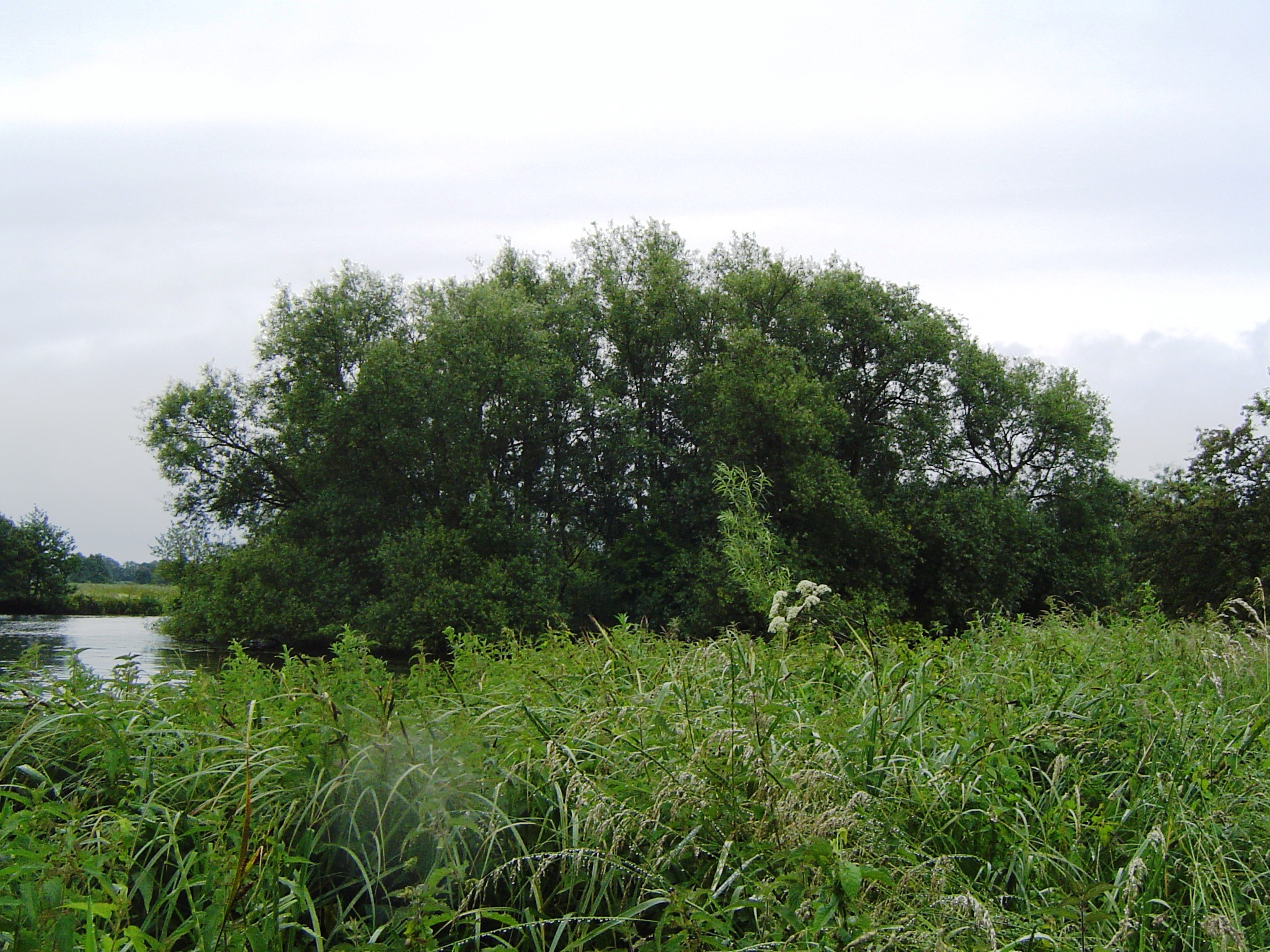
Hallsmead Ait from downstream.

Hallsmead Ait is an island in the River Thames in Berkshire, England. It is on the reach above Shiplake Lock near Lower Shiplake.

The island is large and triangular shaped, forming a pair with The Lynch, a similar shaped island. It is uninhabited and covered with a wide variety of trees. It is close to the county boundary with Oxfordshire, which follows the more northwestern of the two channels where the river splits around the island.

Berry Brook starts close to the Redgrave-Pinsent Rowing Lake to the southwest, running northeast through the Thames floodplain, before joining the river at Hallsmead Ait.

In 2025 it was put up for sale by auction in November, by its owner Jamie Waller said it "offers something truly rare, a self-contained island retreat located in one of England's most desirable riverside settings".

== See also ==
- Islands in the River Thames

| Next island upstream | River Thames | Next island downstream |
| Buck Ait | Hallsmead Ait | The Lynch |
