= Reading Town Regatta =

Annual rowing regatta in Reading, England

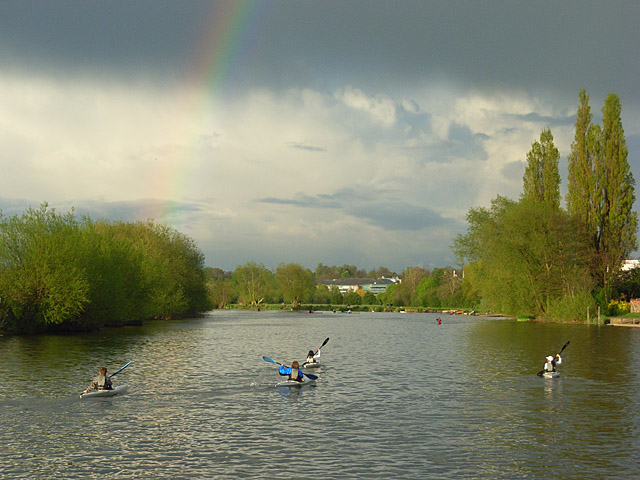
The River Thames at Thames Valley Park

Reading Town Regatta is an annual rowing regatta that takes place at the town of Reading in Berkshire on the River Thames in southern England. It is held near the Thames Valley Park business park on the south side of the river. A more local Thames Valley Park Regatta takes place at the same location. The course length for Reading Town Regatta is 800m with the Thames Valley Park Regatta length being 500m.

The Reading Working Men’s Regatta was established in 1877. It was promoted by the Mayor and Corporation of Reading, receiving Royal patronage in 1896. The present title of the event was adopted in 1966. The event is normally held in June each year.

The regatta can be a stepping-stone for rowing crews to the Henley Royal Regatta, held nearby at Henley-on-Thames each July. Some crew members go on to be selected to row at Great Britain national level.

== See also ==
- Reading Amateur Regatta
- Sonning Regatta, downstream from Reading Town Regatta
- Henley Royal Regatta
- Marlow Town Regatta
