= Jamie Waller (entrepreneur) =

British businessman

- Citizenship: United Kingdom
- Occupation: Entrepreneur
- Organization: Firestarters
- Title: Chair

Jamie B. Waller is an entrepreneur. He founded the debt collection and outsourcing company JBW Group; fintech solutions company Hito; the private equity firm Firestarters; and the fintech company Just, where he serves as chair.

== Early life and education ==
Waller was born in London's East End. He attended Raine's Foundation School, but left with no qualifications. He later studied business at Cranfield University, Stanford University, and the London Business School.

While growing up in East London Waller was part of the Imps, a charity for disadvantaged children which, in 2015, he saved, with the help of other entrepreneurs, from going bankrupt. He was part of the Imps from age 5 through to 16. As a child from a disadvantaged background, and who also suffered from dyslexia, Waller was also helped by the charity The Prince's Trust

In 2018, Cranfield University awarded him the Entrepreneur of the Year award.

== Career ==
Waller started working as a debt collector but quit at the age of 21, planning to travel the world for a year. In Australia, he started a business building and selling camper vans for other tourists.

He founded the debt collection company JBW Group in 2004. In 2014, the firm attempted unsuccessfully to obtain a legal injunction preventing the BBC from airing a Panorama episode critical of the company's practices. In 2015, the Crown Prosecution Service dropped charges against a man arrested for allegedly assaulting a JBW bailiff, concluding that the bailiff was trespassing and that the man was within his rights to use reasonable force to eject him. In 2017, he sold the business to a Japanese company, Outsourcing Inc. Waller founded the financial services technology company, Hito, six days after selling JBW Group. In 2017, the company was also sold to Outsourcing Inc.

During his career, he was stabbed and held hostage at gunpoint.

In 2009, the UK Ministry of Justice (MoJ) issued a series of contracts for bailiff services to be provided for magistrates courts in England and Wales. JBW Group's tender was unsuccessful and the Group challenged the MoJ, alleging that there had been a breach of the Public Contracts Regulations 2006 in the way the tender exercise had been undertaken. Their claim was dismissed on the basis that the contracts concerned were service concessions and not public services contracts, and the dismissal was upheld by the Court of Appeal in 2012.

Waller founded the private equity business Firestarters in 2017. In 2017, he acquired the international consulting firm Arum and in 2019 founded the FinTech firm Just.

In 2021, in response to the international pandemic, Waller introduced a technology solution to the industry to protect vulnerable people from being visited by Government collection companies, which the Government and industry tried to stop. His business, Just, was successful in taking the matter to the High Court which ruled that a person in debt can request that a visit was undertaken virtually and not in person, which would save costs from those in debt, and prevent the spread of Covid.

Waller is also the Founder and immediate past Chair of the Prince's Trust Enterprise Network which he formed in 2020. In 2023, he accepted the Lifetime Achievement Award on behalf of His Majesty King Charles III and The Prince's Trust at the Business Champion Awards.

== Media ==
Waller featured in the BBC's Bailiffs TV show for two years beginning in 2000 along with other members of WiseHill and JBW staff. He was also featured in the follow-up show The Enforcers, and in the debt advice show Beat the Bailiff.

He is also the author of two books, Unsexy Business and The Dyslexic Entrepreneur
