= Redgrave Pinsent Rowing Lake =

Rowing lake in England

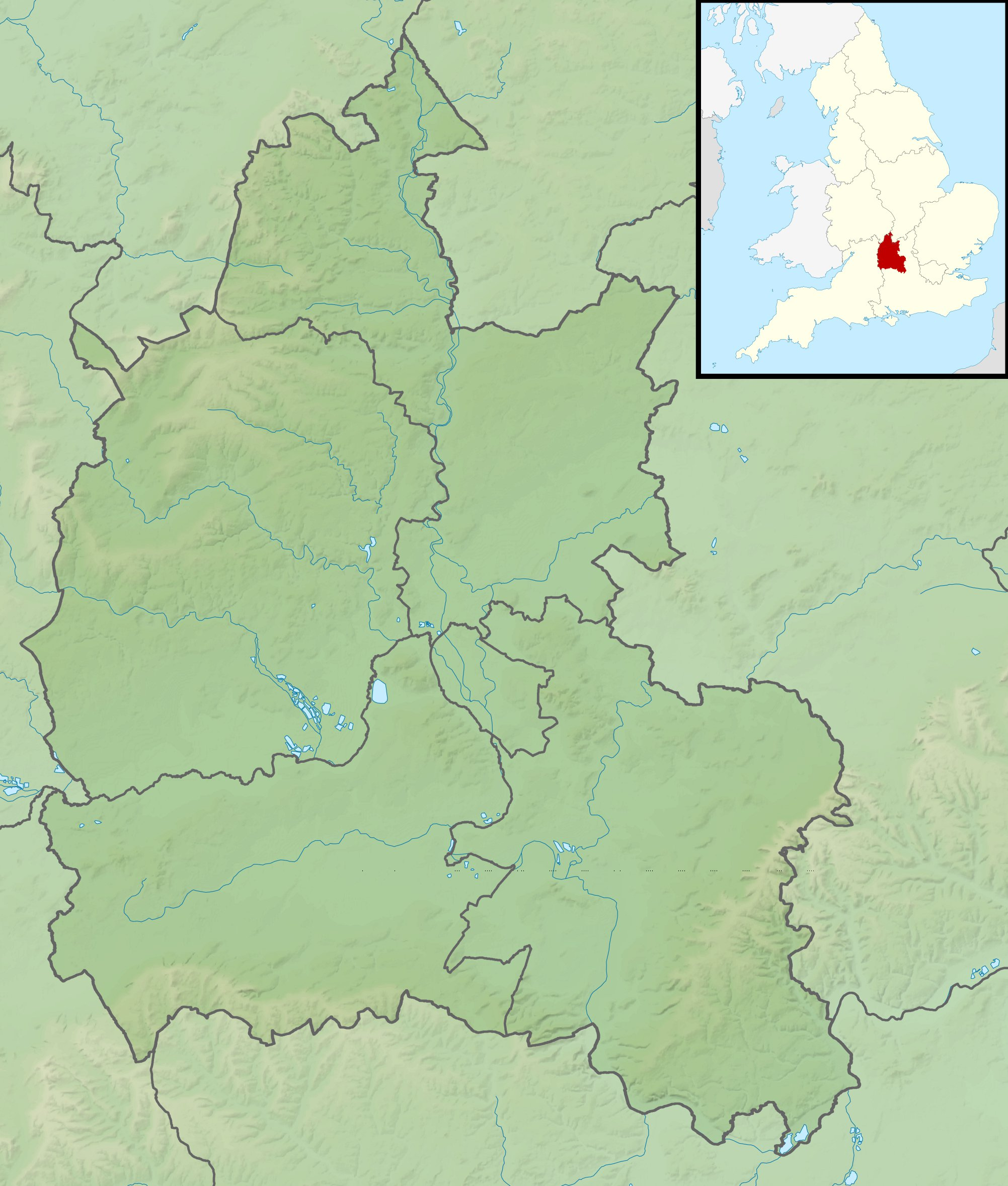
- Location within Oxfordshire
- Location: Oxfordshire
- Coordinates: 51.46290°N 0.94194°W
- Type: artificial lake, rowing lake
- Basin countries: United Kingdom

The Redgrave Pinsent Rowing Lake is a rowing lake in the United Kingdom, named after the Olympic rowers Sir Steve Redgrave and Sir Matthew Pinsent. The lake and its boathouse are specifically designed for training use, and provide training, medical, and scientific facilities for the GB rowing squad, and for Oxford University in preparation for the Boat Race. The lake is also used by crews from University College, Oxford and Oxford Brookes University.

The lake is situated in the South Oxfordshire parish of Eye & Dunsden between the Reading suburb of Caversham and the village of Sonning Eye. It was created by the selective dredging and reclamation of part of the Caversham Lakes adjoining the River Thames and which had originally resulted from gravel extraction by Sonning Works. The £13 million project was the work of David Sherriff and a partnership of the Caversham Lakes Trust, Sport England, the Amateur Rowing Association and the Thames and Kennet Marina. The lake was officially opened in April 2006 by the two men after which it is named.
