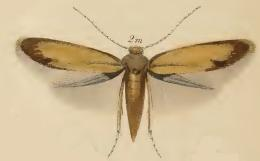

Scientific classification
- Domain: Eukaryota
- Kingdom: Animalia
- Phylum: Arthropoda
- Class: Insecta
- Order: Lepidoptera
- Family: Tischeriidae
- Genus: Coptotriche
- Species: C. marginea

Binomial name
- Coptotriche marginea (Haworth, 1828)

Synonyms
- Tinea marginea Haworth, 1828; Tischeria marginea; Emmetia marginea

= Coptotriche marginea =

Species of moth

Coptotriche marginea is a moth of the family Tischeriidae, found in most of Europe. It was named by the English botanist, carcinologist and entomologist, Adrian Hardy Haworth in 1828, from a specimen found in England. The larvae mine the leaves of brambles (Rubus) species.

== Description ==
The wingspan is 7–8 mm. Adults are brownish with a slight metallic sheen. The forewings are ochreous-yellow.The costa anteriorly narrowly, posteriorly broadly suffused with dark purplish-fuscous. The termen suffused with dark purplish-fuscous with a dark fuscous tornal dot. The hindwings are rather dark grey.

They are on wing from May to June and again in August.

Ovum

Eggs are laid on the upper surface on a bramble leaf, especially Rubus fruticosus.

Larvae

The larvae feed on European dewberry (Rubus caesius), Rubus canescens, Armenian blackberry (Rubus armeniacus), blackberry (Rubus fruticosus), Rubus grabowskii, Rubus hypargyrus, raspberry (Rubus idaeus), evergreen blackberry (Rubus laciniatus), Rubus macrophyllus, Rubus nemorosus and stone bramble (Rubus saxatilis). They mine the leaves of their host plant. Occupied mines can be found in June and again from September to March.

Pupa

Pupation takes place within the mine and the pupa is not enclosed in a cocoon.

== Gallery ==
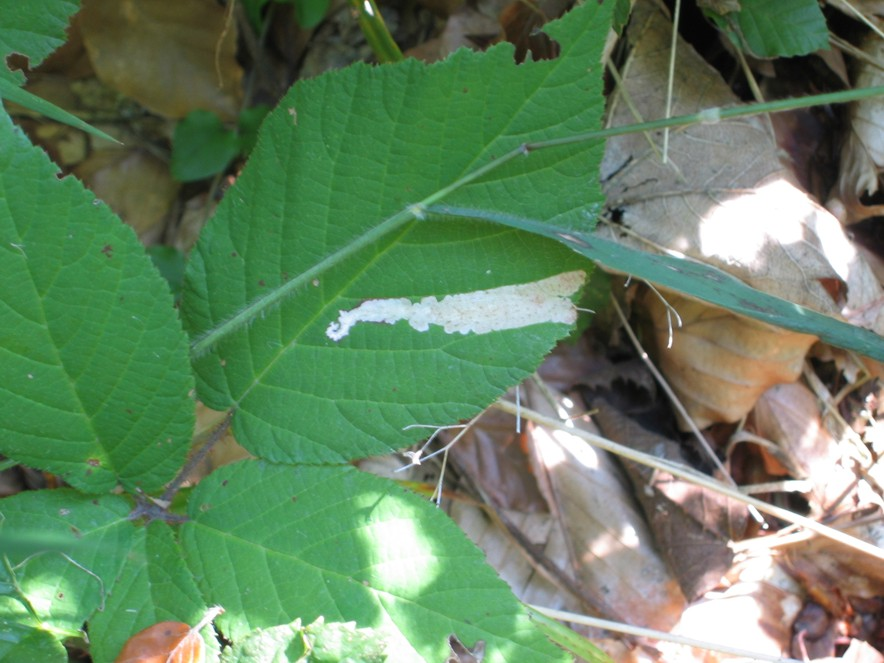

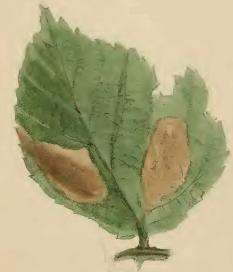
A mined bramble leaf

Larva

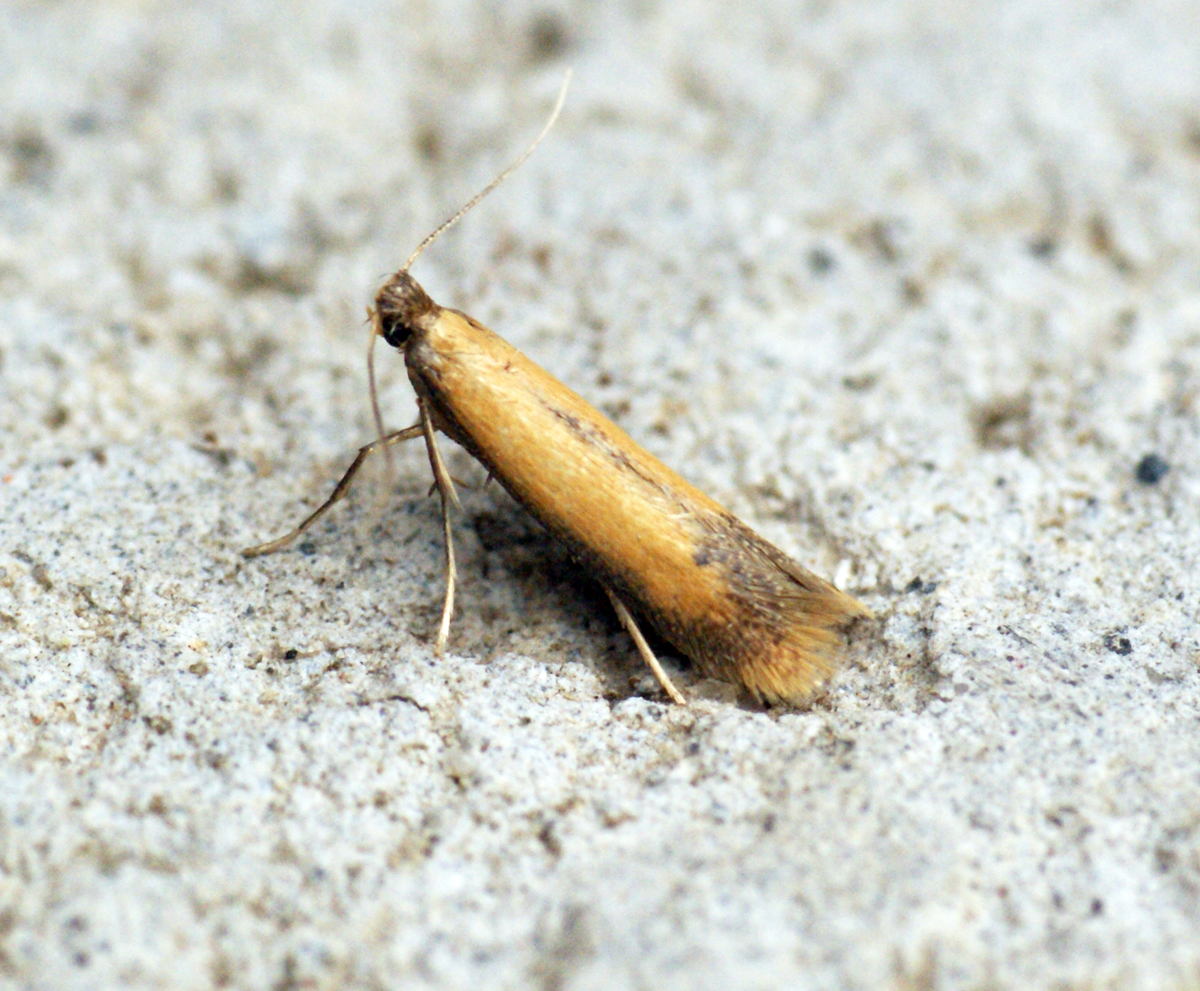

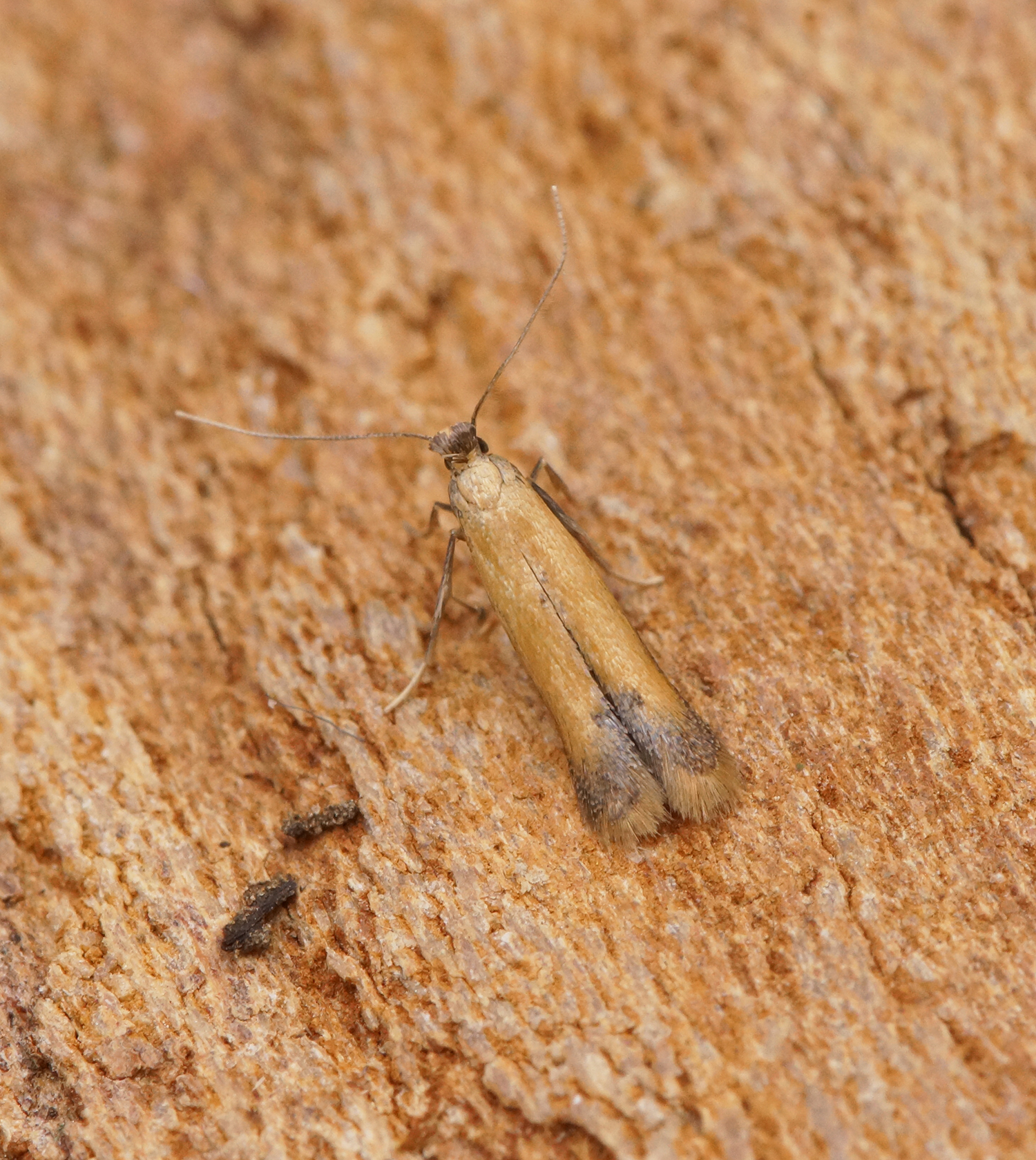

== Taxonomy ==
Haworth originally called the moth Tinea marginea in 1828; the genus erected by the 18th-century Swedish botanist, zoologist and taxonomist, Carl Linnaeus in 1758. The moth was later placed in the genus Tischeria and then Emmetia. It is now in the genus Coptotriche. The specific name, marginea, from the Greek margineus - of a margin or an edge, from the dark costa and terminal margin of the forewing.
