= Stigmella pretiosa =

Scientific classification
- Kingdom: Animalia
- Phylum: Arthropoda
- Clade: Pancrustacea
- Class: Insecta
- Order: Lepidoptera
- Family: Nepticulidae
- Genus: Stigmella
- Species: S. pretiosa

Binomial name
- Stigmella pretiosa (Heinemann, 1862)

Synonyms
- Nepticula pretiosa Heinemann, 1862; Nepticula bollii Frey, 1873; Nepticula tatrensis Borkowski, 1970

Species of moth

Stigmella pretiosa is a moth of the family Nepticulidae. It is found from Fennoscandia to the Alps, and from Scotland to the Baltic region and Slovakia.

The wingspan is 5.5-6.5 mm. There is one generation per year.

The larvae feed on Geum montanum, Geum rivale, Geum urbanum, Rubus caesius, Rubus fruticosus, Rubus idaeus and Rubus macrophyllus. They mine the leaves of their host plant.
