= Ectoedemia rubivora =

Scientific classification
- Kingdom: Animalia
- Phylum: Arthropoda
- Clade: Pancrustacea
- Class: Insecta
- Order: Lepidoptera
- Family: Nepticulidae
- Genus: Ectoedemia
- Species: E. rubivora

Binomial name
- Ectoedemia rubivora (Wocke, 1860)

Synonyms
- Nepticula rubivora Wocke, 1860

Species of moth

Ectoedemia rubivora is a moth of the family Nepticulidae. It is found from Fennoscandia to the Pyrenees, Italy and Serbia, and from Ireland to central Russia and Ukraine.

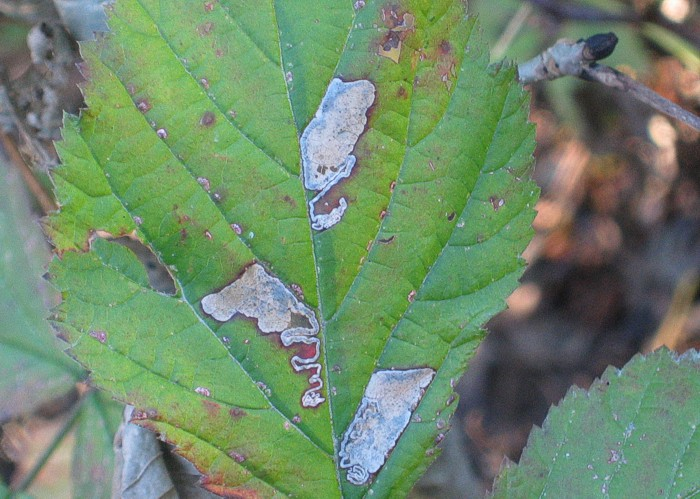
Damage

The wingspan is 4.6–6 mm. The head is black or sometimes a ferruginous-brown. The antennal eyecaps are white. The forewing ground colour is black and there is a somewhat bent shining silvery fascia hardly beyond middle; outer half of cilia beyond a black line whitish. Hindwings are grey.

Adults are on wing from June to July. There is one generation per year.

The larvae feed on Rubus arcticus, Rubus caesius, Rubus chamaemorus, Rubus fruticosus and Rubus saxatilis. They mine the leaves of their host plant.
