= Dewberry =

Type of black berry

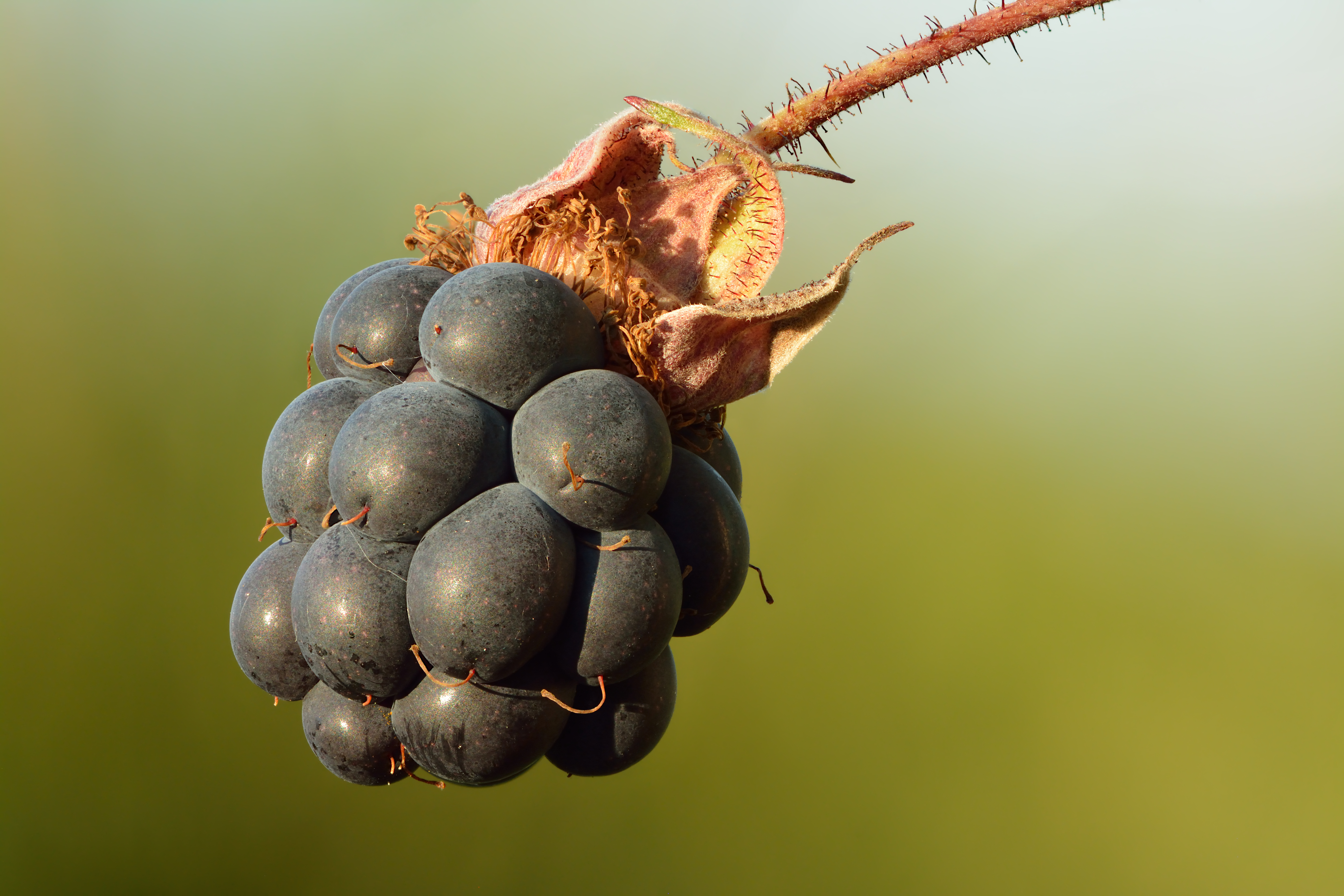
Ripe European dewberry

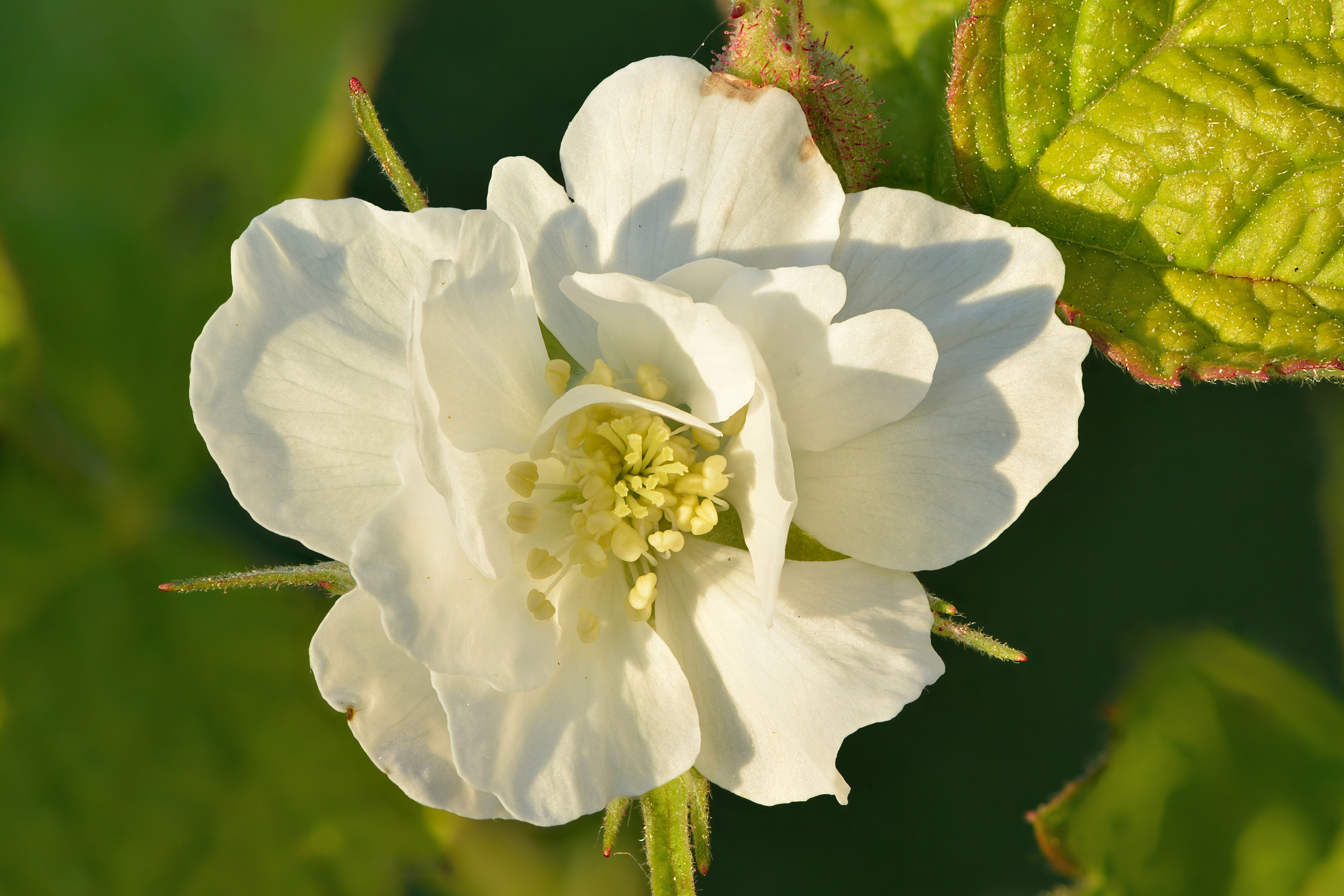
Rubus caesius

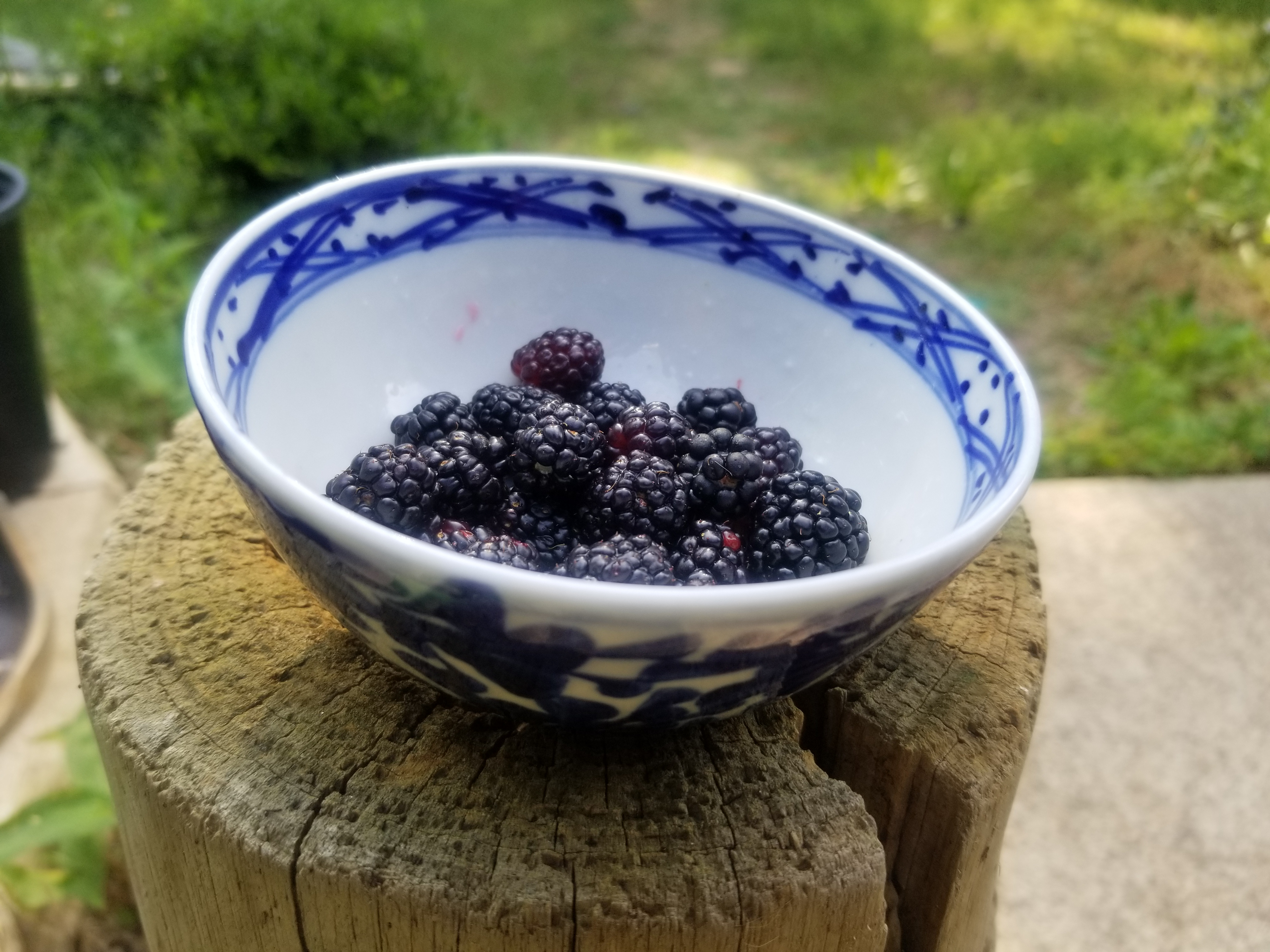
Wild dewberries, picked in North Texas

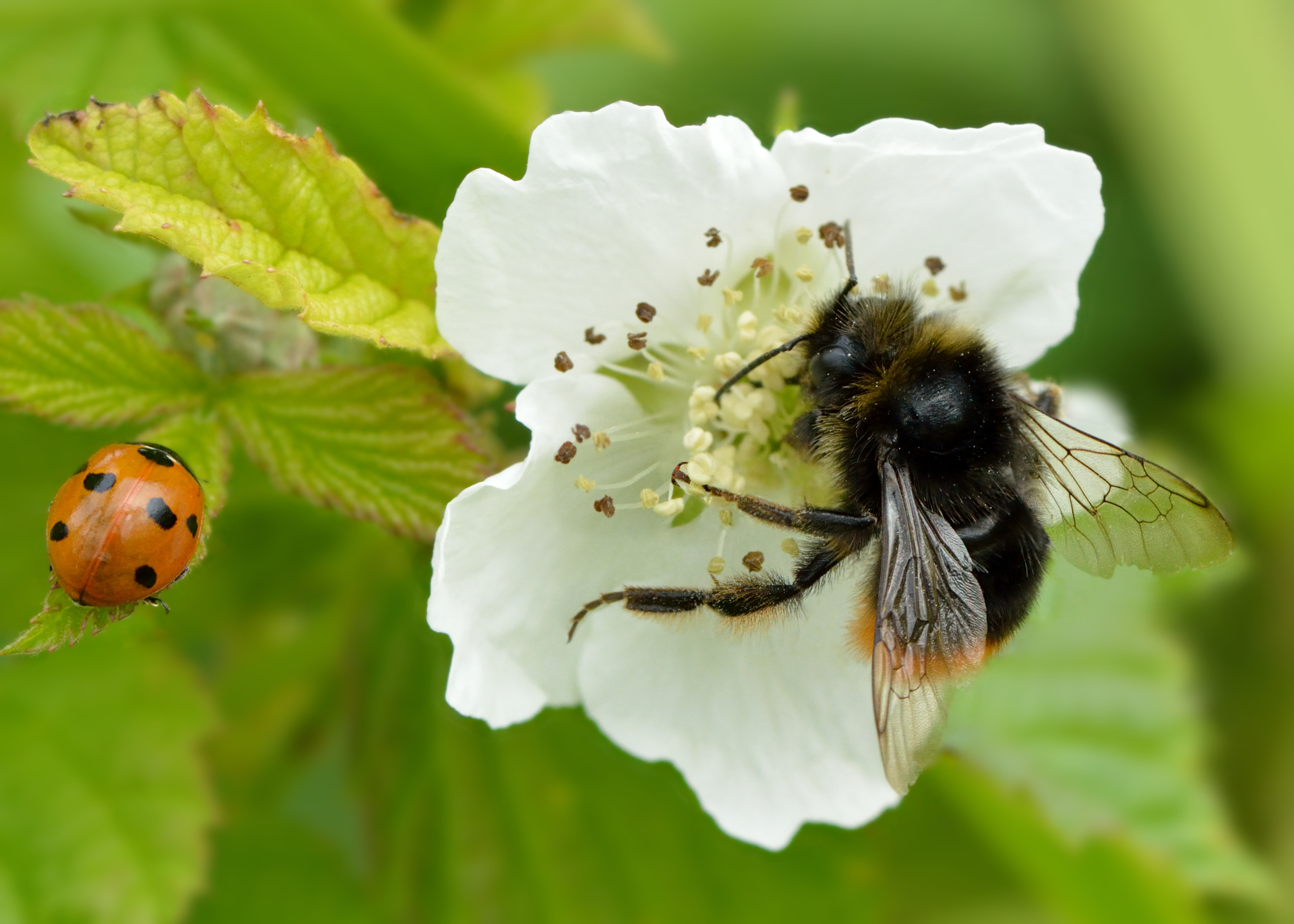
A flower of a European dewberry (Rubus caesius) being pollinated by a red-tailed bumblebee (Bombus lapidarius). A seven-spot ladybird (Coccinella septempunctata) is also present.

Dewberries are a group of species in the genus Rubus, section Rubus, closely related to the blackberries. Rubus species referred to as dewberries in North America are small, trailing (rather than upright or high-arching) brambles with aggregate fruits, reminiscent of the raspberry, but are usually purple to black instead of red. In Europe, dewberry primarily refers to Rubus caesius, a plant with arching stems.

== Description ==
The plants do not have upright canes like some other Rubus species, but have stems that trail along the ground, putting forth new roots along the length of the stem. The stems are covered with fine spines or stickers. Around March and April, the plants start to grow white flowers that develop into small, green berries. The tiny, green berries grow red and then a deep purple-blue as they ripen. When the berries are ripe, they are tender and difficult to pick in any quantity without squashing them. The berries are sweet and often less seedy than blackberries. In the winter, the leaves often remain on the stems, but may turn dark red.

The European dewberry, Rubus caesius, grows more upright like other brambles. Its fruits are a deep, almost black, purple and are coated with a thin layer or 'dew' of waxy droplets. Thus, they appear sky blue (caesius being Latin for pale blue). Its fruits are small and retain a markedly tart taste even when fully ripe.

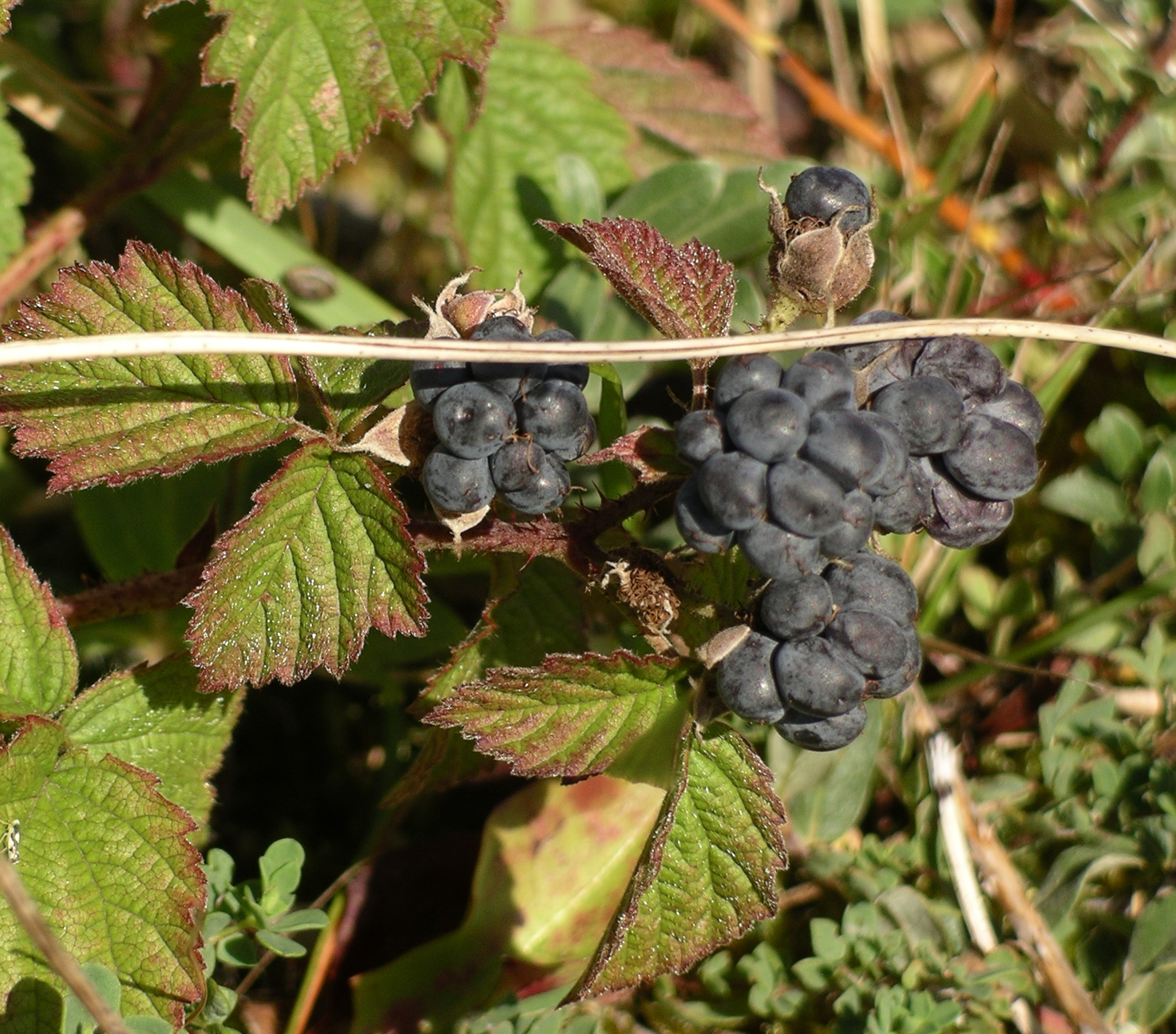
European dewberry growing on sand dunes at Newborough, Wales

== Species ==
- Rubus section Caesii, European dewberry
  - European dewberry, Rubus caesius L.
- Rubus section Flagellares, American dewberries
  - Rubus aboriginum Rydb., synonyms:
    - Rubus almus (L.H. Bailey) L.H.Bailey
    - Rubus austrinus L.H.Bailey
    - Rubus bollianus L.H.Bailey
    - Rubus clair-brownii' L.H.Bailey
    - Rubus decor L.H. Bailey
    - Rubus flagellaris Willd. var. almus L.H.Bailey
    - Rubus foliaceus L.H. Bailey
    - Rubus ignarus L.H. Bailey
    - Rubus ricei L.H. Bailey
  - Aberdeen dewberry, Rubus depavitus L.H.Bailey
  - Northern dewberry, Rubus flagellaris Willd.
  - Swamp dewberry, Rubus hispidus L.
  - Upland dewberry, Rubus invisus (L.H.Bailey) Britton
  - Pacific dewberry, Rubus ursinus Cham. & Schltdl.
  - Southern dewberry Rubus trivialis L.H.Bailey

== Distribution and habitat ==
Dewberries are common throughout most of the Northern Hemisphere, and are thought of as a beneficial weed. R. caesius is frequently restricted to coastal communities, especially sand-dune systems.

== Ecology ==
The leaves are sometimes eaten by the larvae of some Lepidoptera species, including peach blossom moths.

== Uses ==
The leaves can be used to make an herbal tea (tisane), and the berries are edible and taste sweet. They can be eaten raw, or used to make cobbler, jam, or pie.

In the late 19th and early 20th centuries, the town of Cameron, North Carolina, was known as the "dewberry capital of the world" for large-scale cultivation of this berry, which was shipped out for widespread consumption. Local growers made extensive use of the railroads in the area to ship them nationally and internationally.

== See also ==
- Black raspberry
- Boysenberry, a cross between a dewberry and a loganberry
- Cloudberry, a dioecious Rubus species
- Youngberry
