= McIlroy Park and Round Copse =

Public park and nature reserve in Reading, England

Coordinates: 51°27′50″N 1°01′33″W

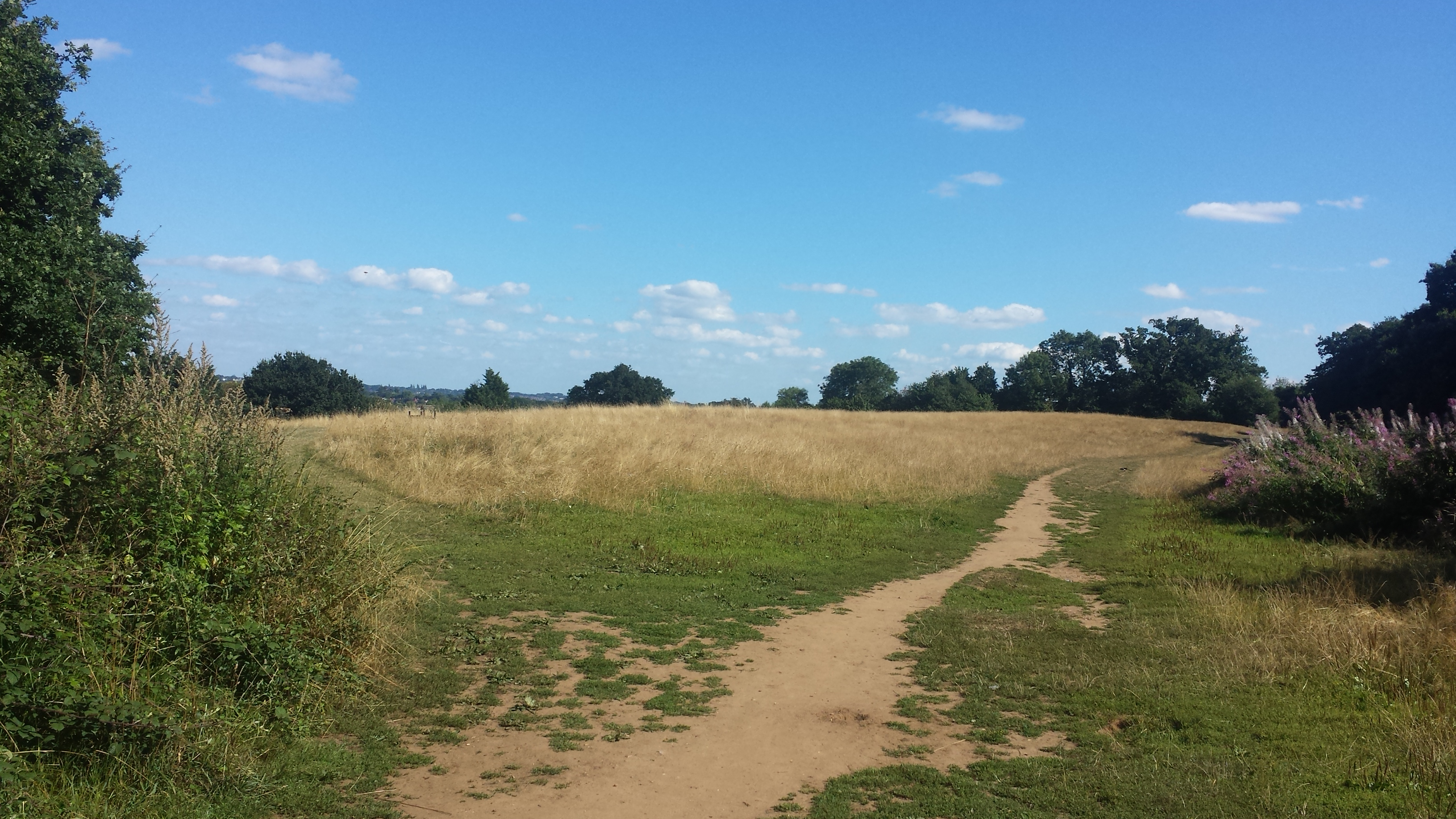
- Interactive map of McIlroy Park and Round Copse
- Type: Local Nature Reserve
- Location: Reading, Berkshire
- OS grid: SU 677 743
- Area: 13.7 hectares (34 acres)
- Manager: Reading Borough Council

McIlroy Park is a 12-hectare (30-acre) urban park and local nature reserve in Tilehurst, a suburb of Reading in Berkshire. Round Copse is an adjoining 1.7-hectare (4.2-acre) local nature reserve. Both are owned and managed by Reading Borough Council.

Along with Blundells Copse and Lousehill Copse, they are part of West Reading Woodlands.

== Geography and site ==
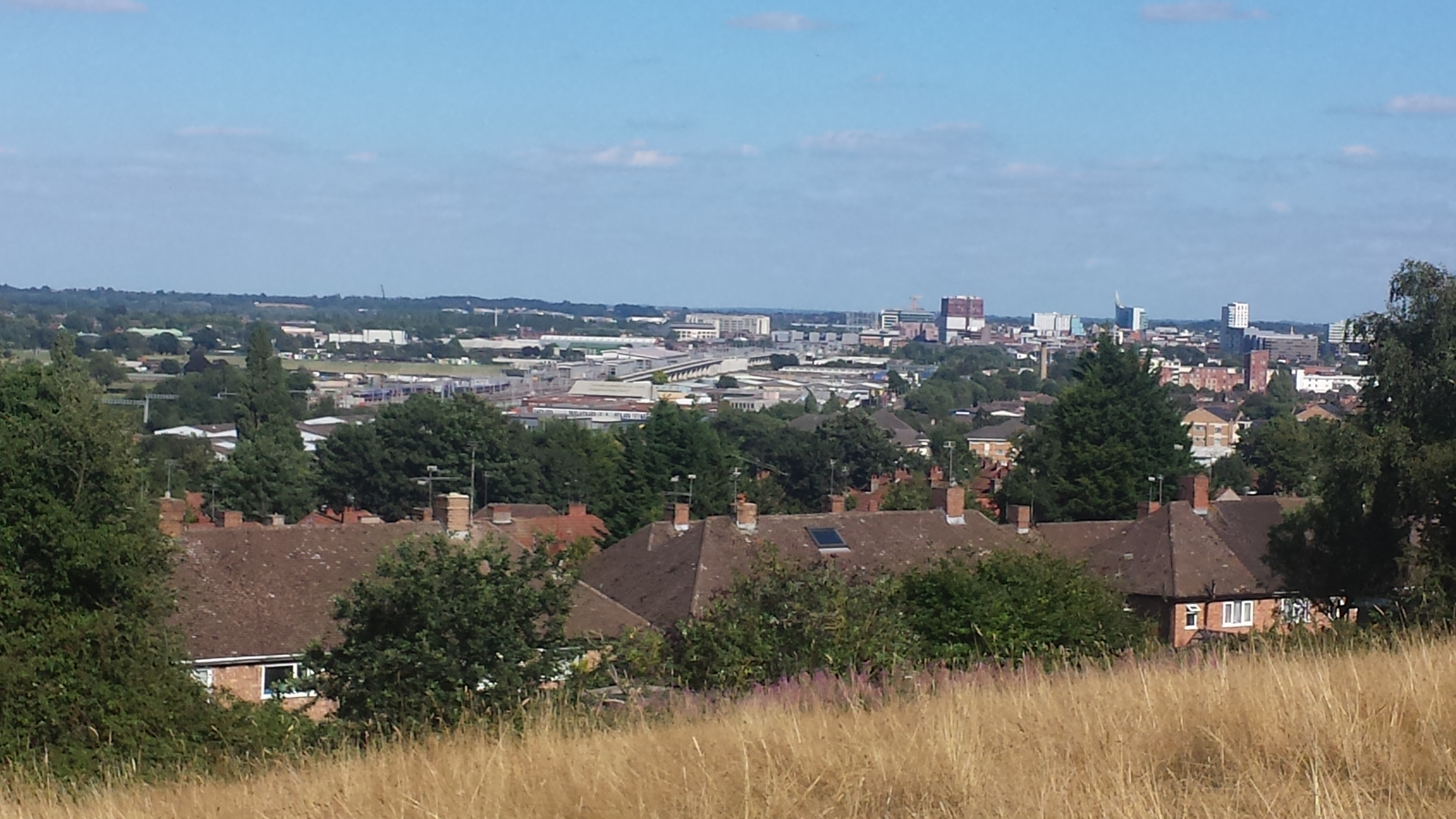
View over Reading from McIlroy Park

McIlroy Park is located on a steep hill and features a large species-rich grassland field and a large block of mixed deciduous woodland. It has extensive views over the River Thames and towards the Mapledurham estate and Reading town centre. Round Copse is a small woodland that abuts, and is contiguous with, McIlroy Park.

There are two ancient sunken paths that pass through the woodland in the south of McIlroy Park and Round Copse, known as Gypsy Lane and Romany Way. Gypsy Lane passes down the hill northwest through the woodland, whilst Romany Way passes up from Pottery Road to the south through the woodland and then east onto the modern Romany Lane (a residential road). Gypsy lane is un-surfaced and is surrounded by an unmade bank with mature beech trees on either side, whilst Romany Way has been surfaced with tarmac.

There are old chalk pits in the west woodland area from the old clay extraction industry and a possible Saxon mound on its eastern edge near Weald Rise.

== History ==
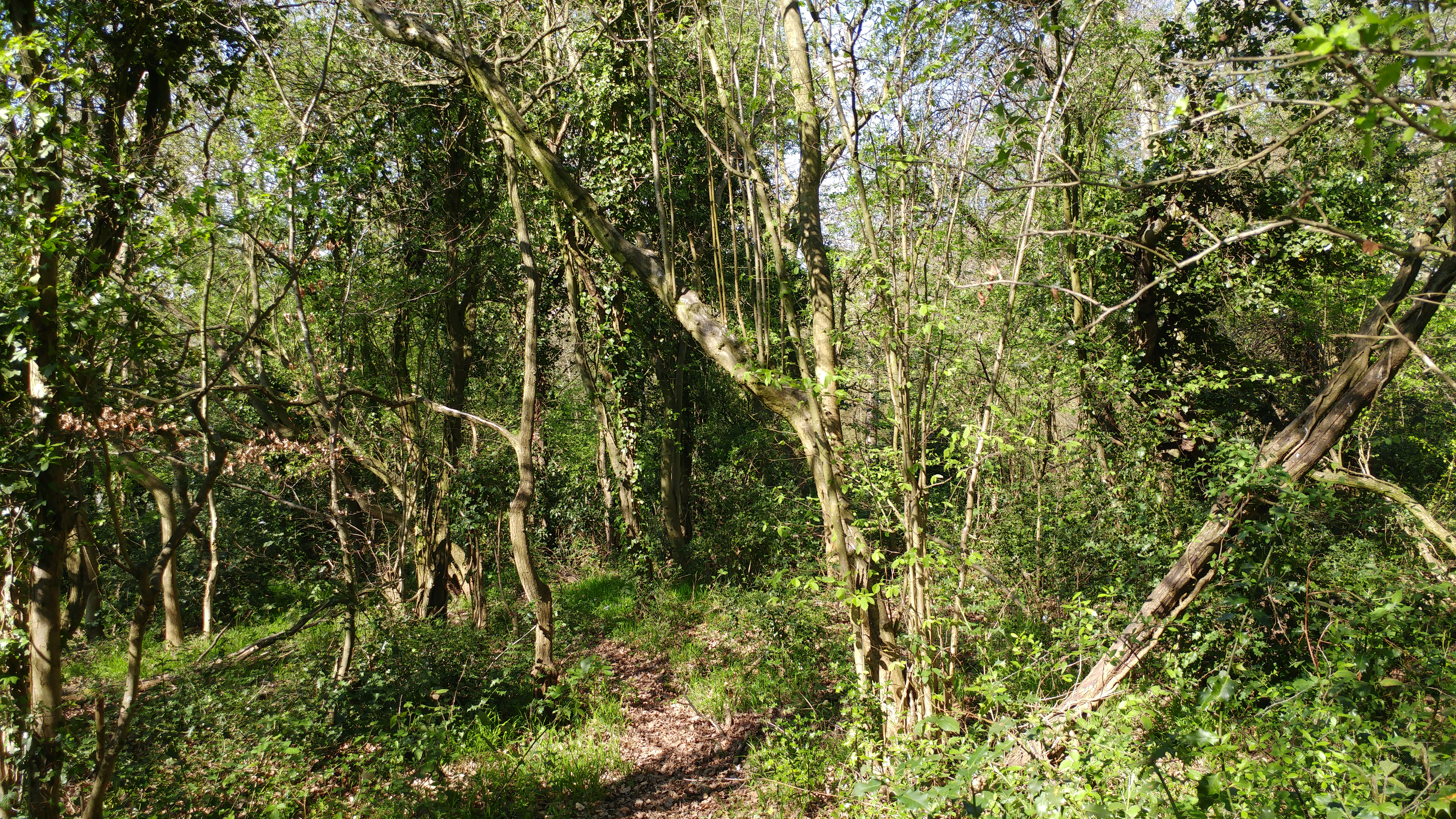
Round Copse

The land for McIlroy Park was donated by William Mcilroy, who owned a department store in Reading, and was mayor of the town.

In 1992, McIlroy Park was designated a local nature reserve. In 2002, Round Copse was also designated a local nature reserve.

== Fauna ==
The site has the following fauna:

=== Birds ===
- Red kite
- Common buzzard
- Common kestrel
- Common starling
- Common whitethroat
- Fieldfare
- European green woodpecker
- Dunnock
- House sparrow
- Mistle thrush
- Redwing
- Song thrush
- Willow warbler
- Eurasian sparrowhawk
- Eurasian jay
- European green woodpecker
- Eurasian nuthatch
- Great spotted woodpecker
- Lesser spotted woodpecker
- Eurasian treecreeper
- Common blackbird

== Invertebrates ==
- Cinnabar moth
- Bombus ruderarius
- Scotopteryx chenopodiata
- Gatekeeper
- Holly blue
- Meadow brown
- Lycaena phlaeas
- Speckled wood

== Flora ==
The site has the following flora:

=== Trees ===
- Acer campestre
- Quercus robur
- Fraxinus
- Hazel
- Ilex aquifolium
- Prunus avium

=== Plants ===
- Hyacinthoides non-scripta
- Catnip
- Mercurialis perennis
- Holcus mollis
- Melica uniflora
- Milium effusum
- Luzula pilosa
- Moehringia trinervia
- Calluna
- Ruscus aculeatus

=== Fungi ===
- Xylaria polymorpha

== See also ==
- List of parks and open spaces in Reading, Berkshire
