= Rubus aboriginum =

Scientific classification
- Kingdom: Plantae
- Clade: Tracheophytes
- Clade: Angiosperms
- Clade: Eudicots
- Clade: Rosids
- Order: Rosales
- Family: Rosaceae
- Genus: Rubus
- Species: R. aboriginum

Binomial name
- Rubus aboriginum Rydb. 1913

Synonyms
- Rubus almus L.H.Bailey; Rubus austrinus L.H.Bailey; Rubus bollianus L.H.Bailey; Rubus clair-brownii L.H.Bailey; Rubus decor L.H. Bailey; Rubus flagellaris var. almus L.H.Bailey; Rubus foliaceus L.H. Bailey; Rubus ignarus L.H. Bailey; Rubus ricei L.H. Bailey

Berry and plant

Rubus aboriginum is a North American species of dewberry in the genus Rubus, a member of the rose family. It is commonly known as garden dewberry and aboriginal dewberry. It is native to the United States and Mexico, primarily in the southern Great Plains.

== Description ==
Rubus aboriginum is a bushy, viny bramble, up to 1.8 metres (6 feet) in height and breadth, but often smaller. Branches appear 'hairy' when young, and become smooth as they mature, with infrequent, short, hooked thorns. The leaves are ovate, with serrated edges; flowers are white, have five petals, and are about 25 millimetres (1 inch) in diameter. The fruits resemble other dewberries or small blackberries.

R. aboriginum is very closely related to the northern dewberry, Rubus flagellaris, and is sometimes treated as a subspecies.

== Distribution and habitat ==
It is native to the United States and Mexico, primarily in the southern Great Plains with additional populations scattered in the eastern US and in Nuevo León.

The species typically inhabits areas of rocky soil and partial shade, such as open woodlands and abandoned fields.
