= Rubus invisus =

- 1913 illustration

Scientific classification
- Kingdom: Plantae
- Clade: Embryophytes
- Clade: Tracheophytes
- Clade: Spermatophytes
- Clade: Angiosperms
- Clade: Eudicots
- Clade: Rosids
- Order: Rosales
- Family: Rosaceae
- Genus: Rubus
- Species: R. invisus

Binomial name
- Rubus invisus (L.H.Bailey) Britton 1893 not (L.H.Bailey) L.H.Bailey 1998

Synonyms
- Rubus canadensis var. invisus L.H. Bailey 1891; Rubus fuscus Weihe; Rubus jactus L.H.Bailey; Rubus masseyi L.H.Bailey; Rubus macdanielsii L.H.Bailey; Rubus redundans L.H.Bailey; Rubus sanfordii L.H.Bailey; Rubus terraltanus L.H.Bailey; Rubus invisus (L.H.Bailey) L.H.Bailey

Species of flowering plant

Rubus invisus is a species of dewberry, known as upland dewberry. Like other dewberries, it is a species of flowering plant in the rose family, related to the blackberry. It is found in the eastern United States.

== Description ==
Rubus invisus is a trailing shrub with stems running along the surface of the ground. The canes are short and form dense mats up to 1.5 feet (46 cm) thick. The leaves are large and very coarsely toothed. The flowers and fruit form on unusually long stems.

== Distribution and habitat ==
Rubus invisus is found in the eastern and east-central United States, including Indiana, Kentucky, Maryland, Massachusetts, Missouri, New Hampshire, New York, Ohio, Pennsylvania, Tennessee, Vermont, Virginia, and West Virginia.

It typically inhabits areas of rocky soil and partial to full shade.
