= Lousehill Copse =

Nature reserve near Reading, England

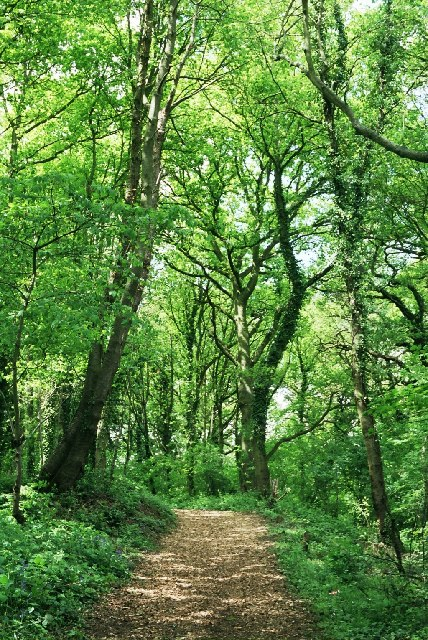
- Lousehill Copse

- Location within Reading, Berkshire
- Type: Local nature reserve
- Location: Tilehurst, Reading, UK
- Coordinates: 51°27′20″N 1°01′16″W
- Area: 13.03 hectares (32.2 acres)
- Created: 1992

Lousehill Copse is a local nature reserve in the Tilehurst suburb of the English town of Reading. The nature reserve is 13.03 hectares (32.2 acres) in size, and is under the management of the Reading Borough Council. The majority of the site comprises natural mature woodland surrounded by housing and featuring a pond, whilst the northern section of the reserve, also known as Comparts Plantation, is a grassy meadow area. To the south the reserve is crossed by Dee Road.

Along with Blundells Copse & McIlroy Park, Lousehill Copse forms part of West Reading Woodlands.

== History ==
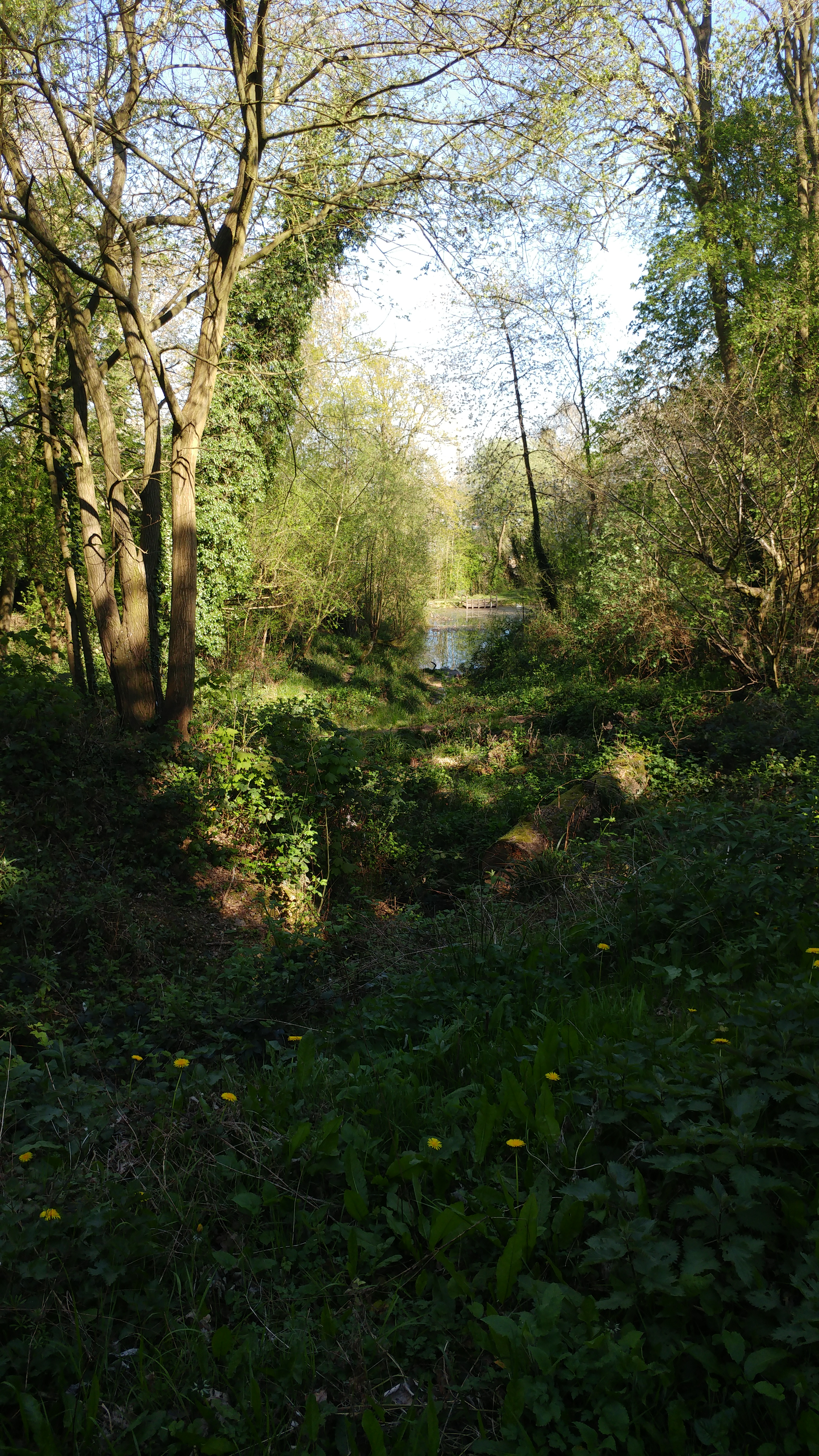
Lousehill Copse - copse and pond - April 2017

The ancient Woodland has been dated back to over 300 years ago.

In 1992 site was designated a Local Nature Reserve.

== Fauna ==
The site has the following fauna:

=== Birds ===
- Red kite
- Great tit
- European robin
- Eurasian magpie
- Eurasian bullfinch
- Goldcrest
- Eurasian treecreeper
- Long-tailed tit
- Lesser spotted woodpecker
- Great spotted woodpecker
- European green woodpecker
- Tawny owl
- Jay

== Flora ==
The site has the following flora:

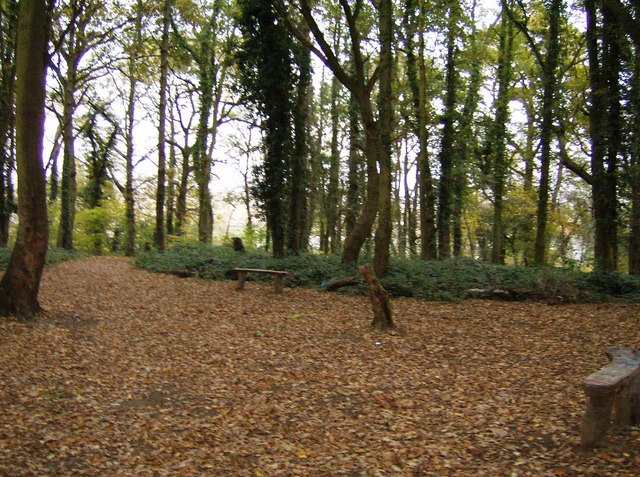
Lousehill Copse - geograph.org.uk - 611925

=== Trees ===
- Tilia × europaea
- Quercus robur
- Taxus baccata
- Betula pendula
- Fagus sylvatica
- Chestnut
- Hazel
- Ilex aquifolium

=== Plants ===
- Hyacinthoides non-scripta
- Ulex
- Genisteae

== See also ==
- List of parks and open spaces in Reading, Berkshire
