= Blundells Copse =

Local nature reserve in Tilehurst, Reading, England

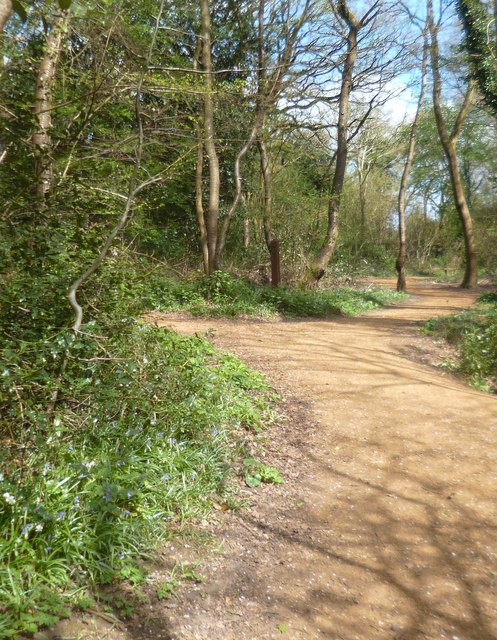
- Path through Blundells Copse

- Location within Reading, Berkshire
- Interactive map of Blundells Copse
- Type: Local nature reserve
- Location: Tilehurst, Reading, UK
- Coordinates: 51°27′23″N 1°01′55″W
- Area: 5.55 hectares (13.7 acres)
- Created: 1992

Blundells Copse is a local nature reserve in the suburb of Tilehurst in the town of Reading, UK. The site is 5.55 hectares (13.7 acres) in size, and comprises a close growing, ancient woodland with a stream. The nature reserve is under the management of the Reading Borough Council and, along with Lousehill Copse and McIlroy Park, is part of West Reading Woodlands.

== History ==
Blundells Copse was part of an area formerly known as the Moor. In 1992, the site was designated a local nature reserve. In 2005, path widening and improvements were made to the reserve as of funding by Living Spaces and the Environmental Trust for Berkshire.

== Fauna ==
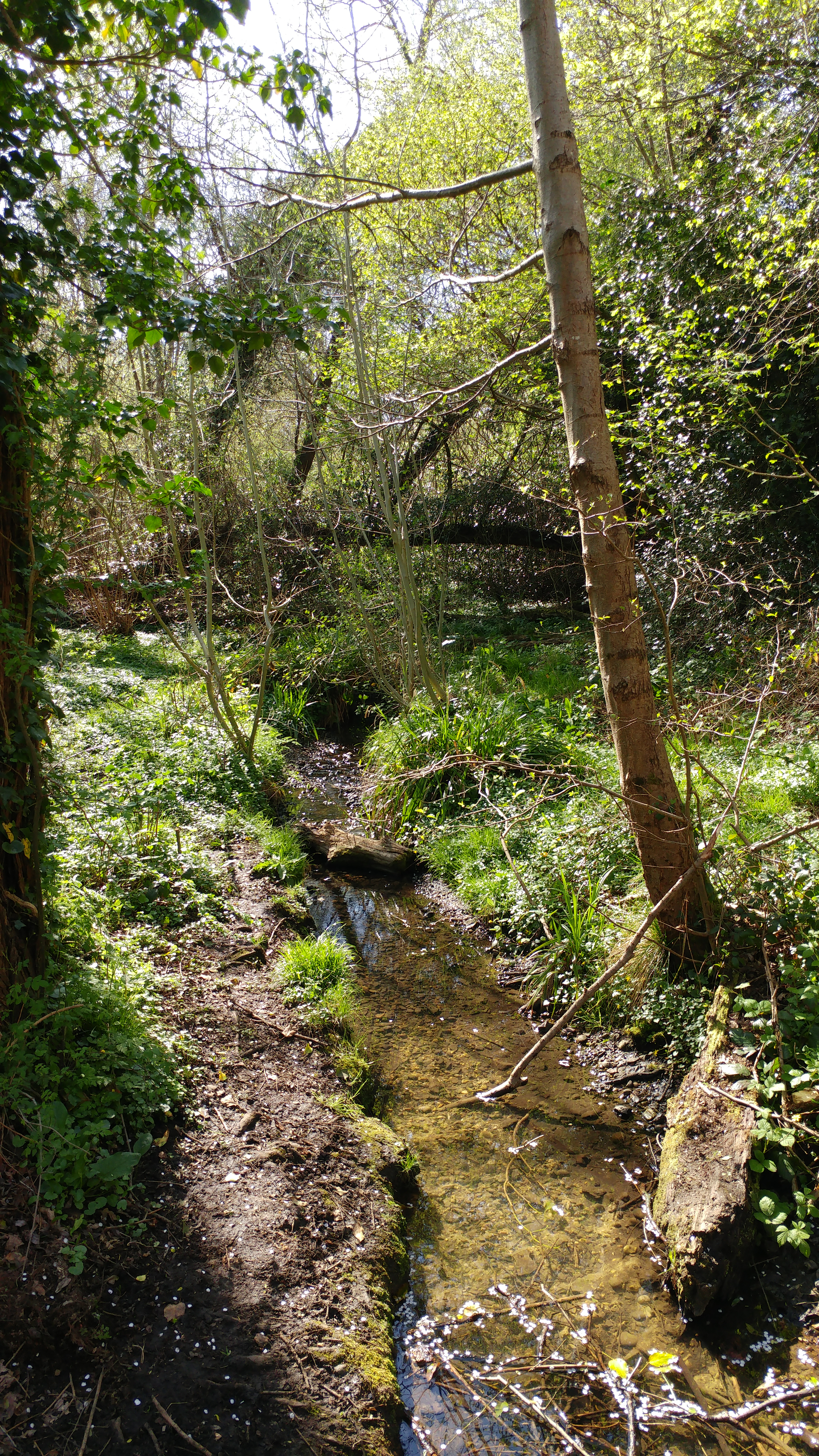
The stream through Blundells Copse in April 2017

The site has the following fauna:

=== Mammals ===
- European hedgehog
- Muntjac

== Flora ==
The site has the following flora:

=== Trees ===
- Alnus glutinosa
- Prunus avium
- Quercus robur
- Fraxinus
- Hazel

=== Plants ===
- Hyacinthoides non-scripta
- Chrysosplenium oppositifolium
- Caltha palustris
- Lamium galeobdolon
- Apium nodiflorum
- Allium triquetrum
- Adoxa moschatellina
- Zantedeschia

== See also ==
- List of parks and open spaces in Reading, Berkshire
