= Rubus depavitus =

Scientific classification
- Kingdom: Plantae
- Clade: Tracheophytes
- Clade: Angiosperms
- Clade: Eudicots
- Clade: Rosids
- Order: Rosales
- Family: Rosaceae
- Genus: Rubus
- Species: R. depavitus

Binomial name
- Rubus depavitus L.H. Bailey 1943

Species of flowering plant

Rubus depavitus is a North American species of dewberry, known as the Aberdeen dewberry. Like other dewberries, it is a species of flowering plant in the rose family, related to the blackberry. It is native to the east-central United States (Indiana, Kentucky, Maryland, North Carolina, New Jersey, Ohio, and West Virginia).
