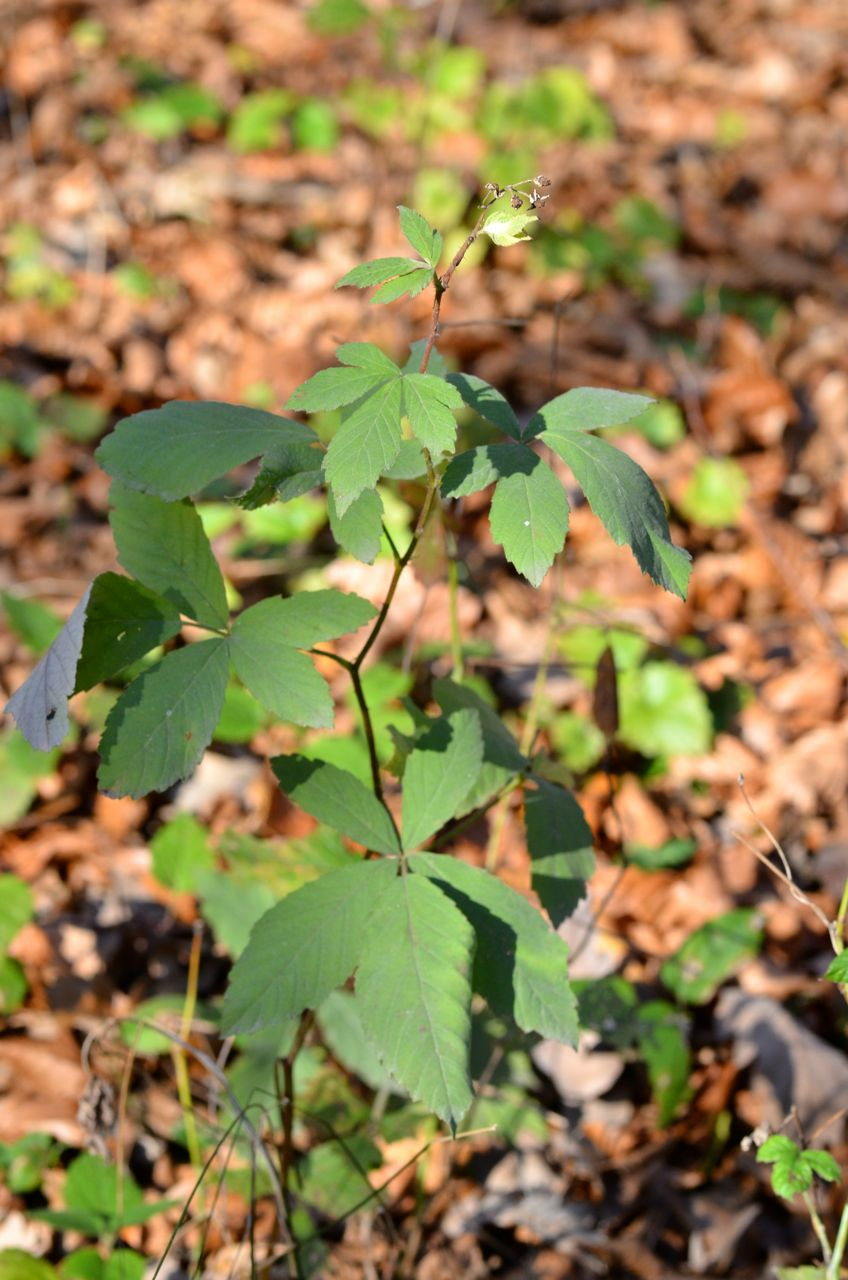

Scientific classification
- Kingdom: Plantae
- Clade: Tracheophytes
- Clade: Angiosperms
- Clade: Eudicots
- Clade: Rosids
- Order: Rosales
- Family: Rosaceae
- Genus: Rubus
- Species: R. canescens

Binomial name
- Rubus canescens DC. 1813

Synonyms
- Synonymy: Rubus albicans Kit.; Rubus argenteus C.C.Gmel.; Rubus australis A.Kern.; Rubus canescens var. glabratus (Godr.) P.H.Davis & Meikle; Rubus canescens subsp. lloydianus (Genev.) Soç.; Rubus canescens f. setosoglandulosus (Wirtg.) H.E.Weber; Rubus cistoides Pau; Rubus hypoleucos Vest; Rubus hypoleucus Vest; Rubus ibericus Sennen & T.S.Elias; Rubus lloydianus Genev.

= Rubus canescens =

Species of fruit and plant

Rubus canescens is a European and Middle Eastern species of brambles in the rose family. It grows in southern and central Europe and in southwestern Asia from Portugal to Iran, north as far as Germany, Poland, and Ukraine.

The genetics of Rubus is extremely complex, so that it is difficult to decide on which groups should be recognized as species. There are many rare species with limited ranges such as this. Further study is suggested to clarify the taxonomy.
