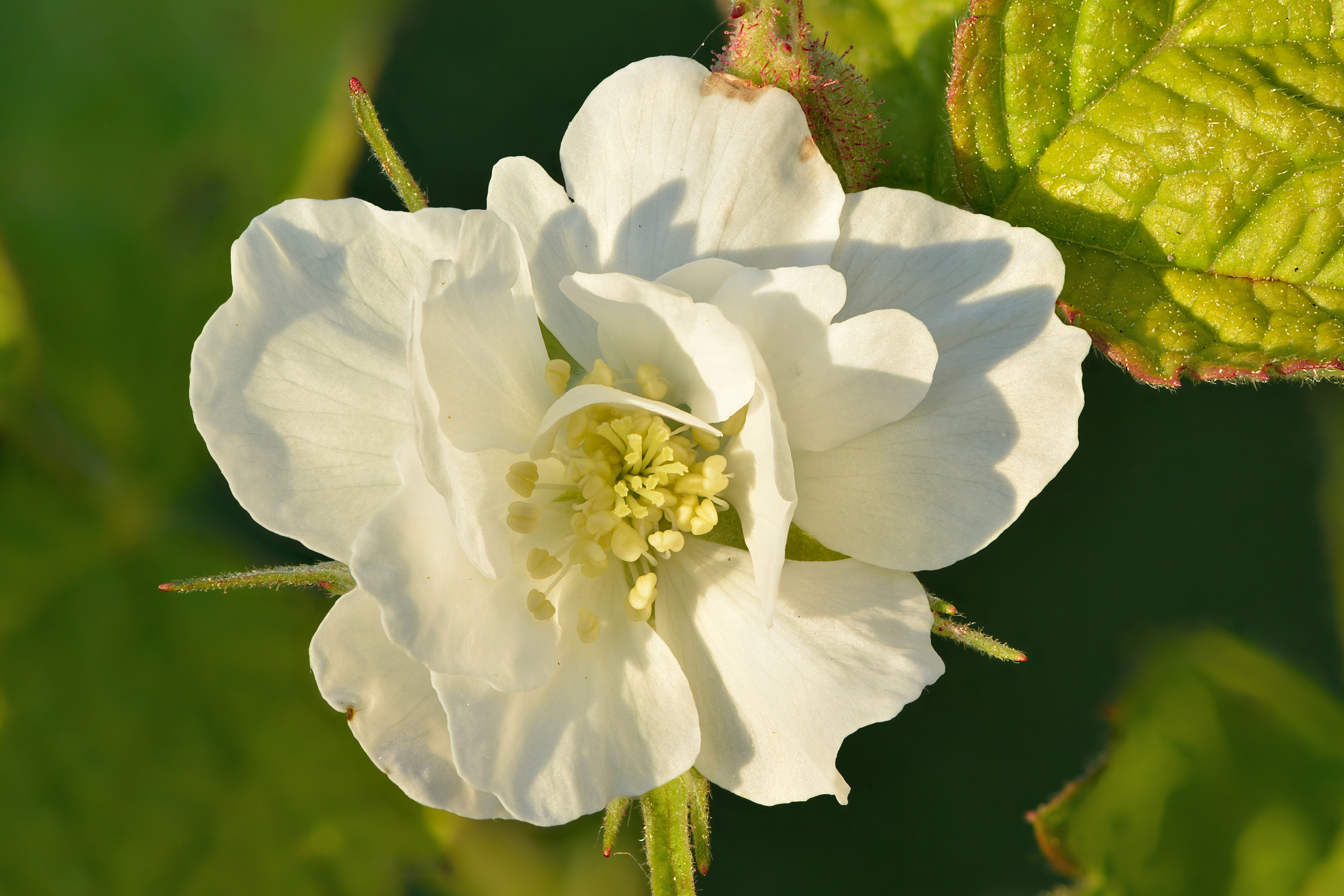

Scientific classification
- Kingdom: Plantae
- Clade: Tracheophytes
- Clade: Angiosperms
- Clade: Eudicots
- Clade: Rosids
- Order: Rosales
- Family: Rosaceae
- Genus: Rubus
- Species: R. caesius

Binomial name
- Rubus caesius L.

Synonyms
- Rubus caeruleus Gilib.; Rubus coeruleus Gilib.; Rubus humilis Bubani; Rubus ligerinus Genev.; Rubus mitissimus Ripart ex Genev.; Rubus rivalis Genev.; Rubus sabulosus Sudre; Selnorition cesius (L.) Raf. ex B.D.Jacks.; Selnorition caesius (L.) Raf. ex B.D.Jacks.

= Rubus caesius =

Species of flowering plant

Rubus caesius is a Eurasian species of dewberry, known as the European dewberry. Like other dewberries, it is a species of flowering plant in the rose family, related to the blackberry and raspberry. It is widely distributed across much of Eurasia.

== Description ==
Rubus caesius is a small shrub growing up to 2 metres (6 1/2 feet) tall with biennial stems which die after fruiting in their second year. It sends out long runners which root at the tip to form new plants. The stems are bluish-grey and sometimes prickly. The alternate leaves are hairy above and below. They are stalked and the leaf blades are palmate in shape, either consisting of three oval leaflets with serrated margins and acute points or just being three-lobed.

The inflorescence is a loose cluster of several white flowers about 2.5 cm (1 in) in diameter. The calyx has five sepals and the corolla is composed of five spreading petals with finely toothed margins. There is a boss of stamens in the centre and there are several pistils. The fruit is an aggregate of several black, fleshy drupes with a bluish waxy bloom. The dewberry flowers from June to September.

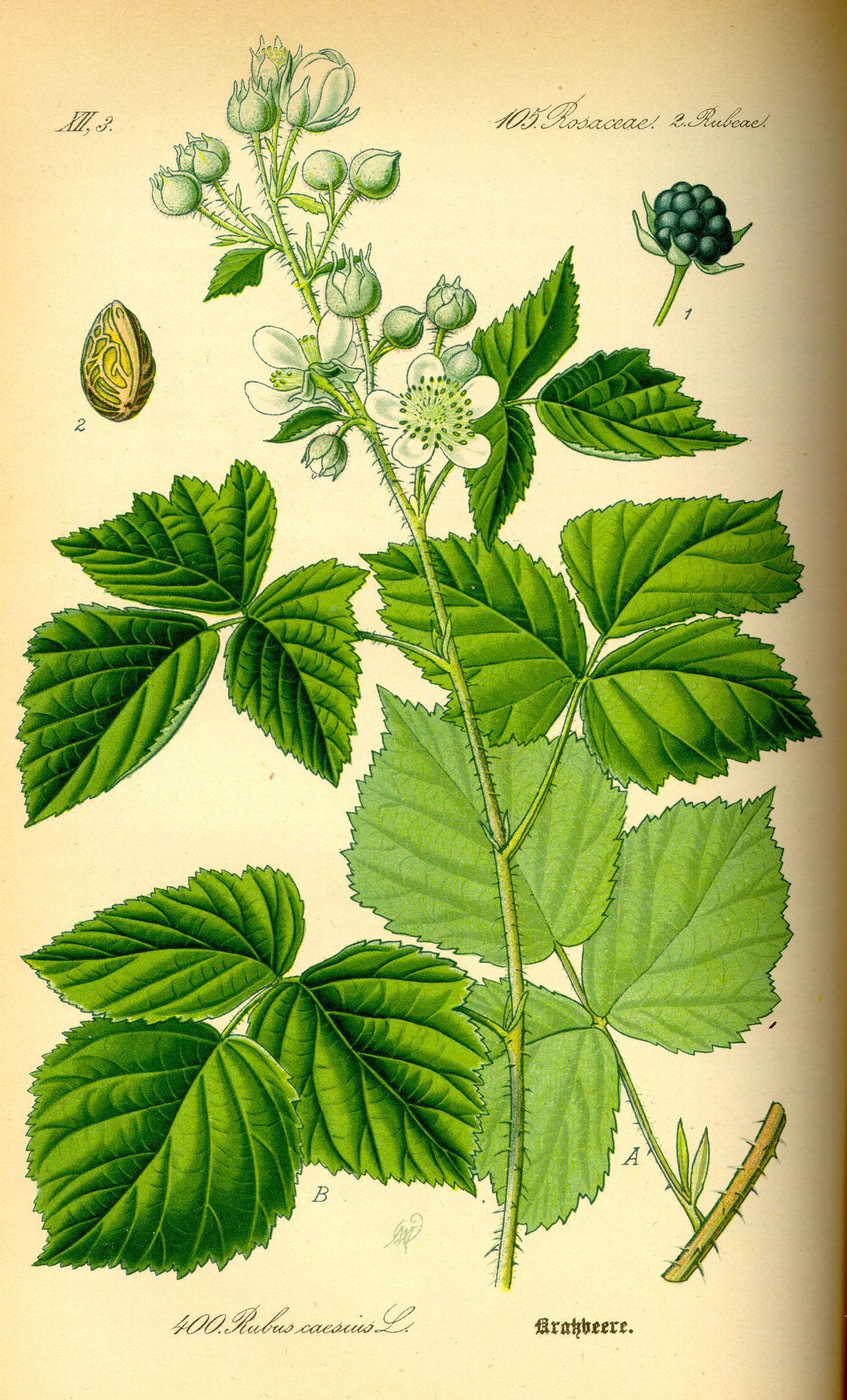
1885 illustration

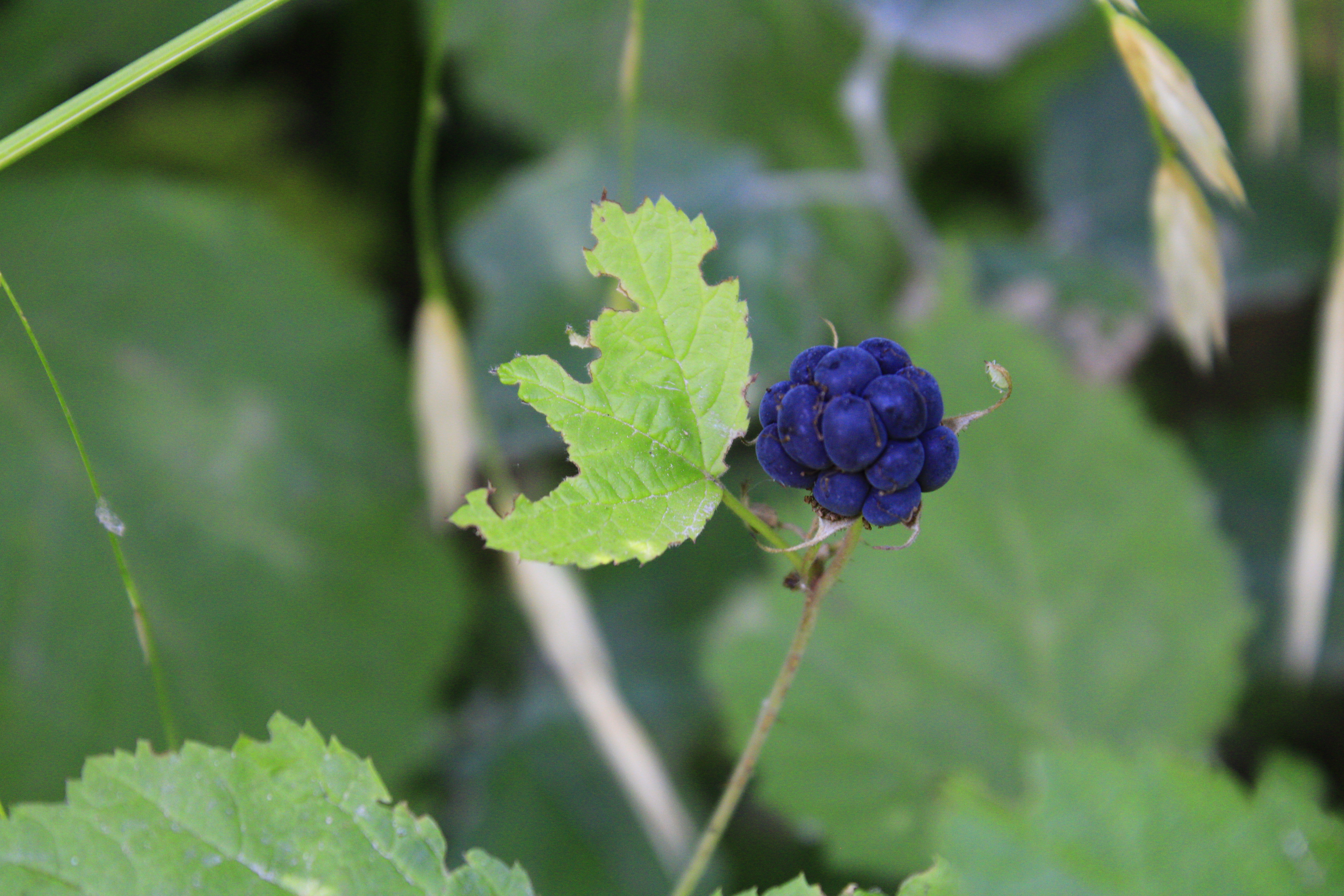
Fruit

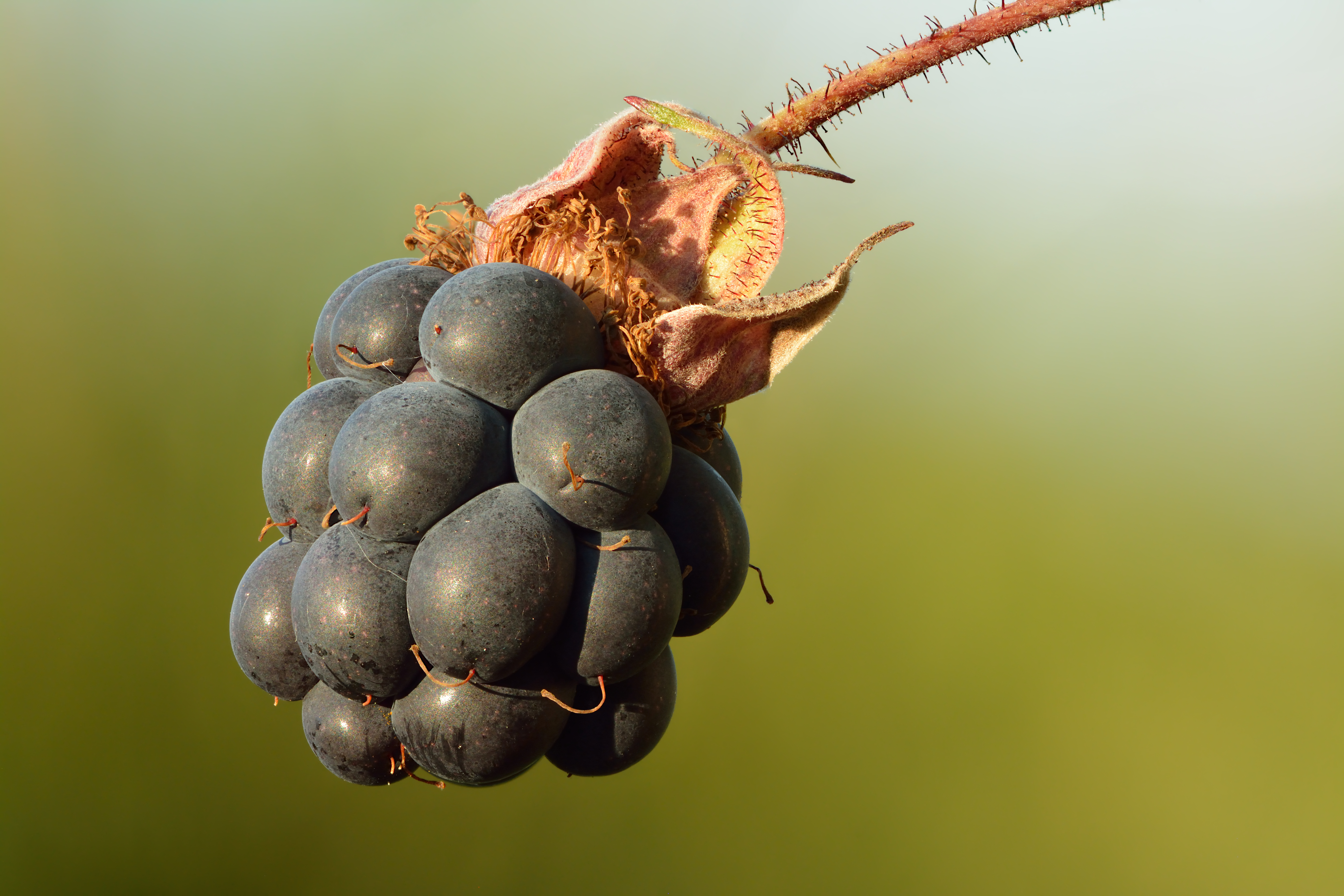
Fruit close-up

=== Similar species ===
The species is similar to and often confused with forms of Rubus fruticosus.

== Distribution and habitat ==
Rubus caesius is widely distributed across much of Europe and Asia from Ireland and Portugal as far east as Xinjiang Province in western China. It has also become sparingly naturalized in scattered locations in Argentina, Canada, and the United States.

It most often inhabits areas with rocky, basic soil and light shade. It is often found in forest margins, coppices, rocky broadleaf woods and waterside thickets.

== Ecology ==
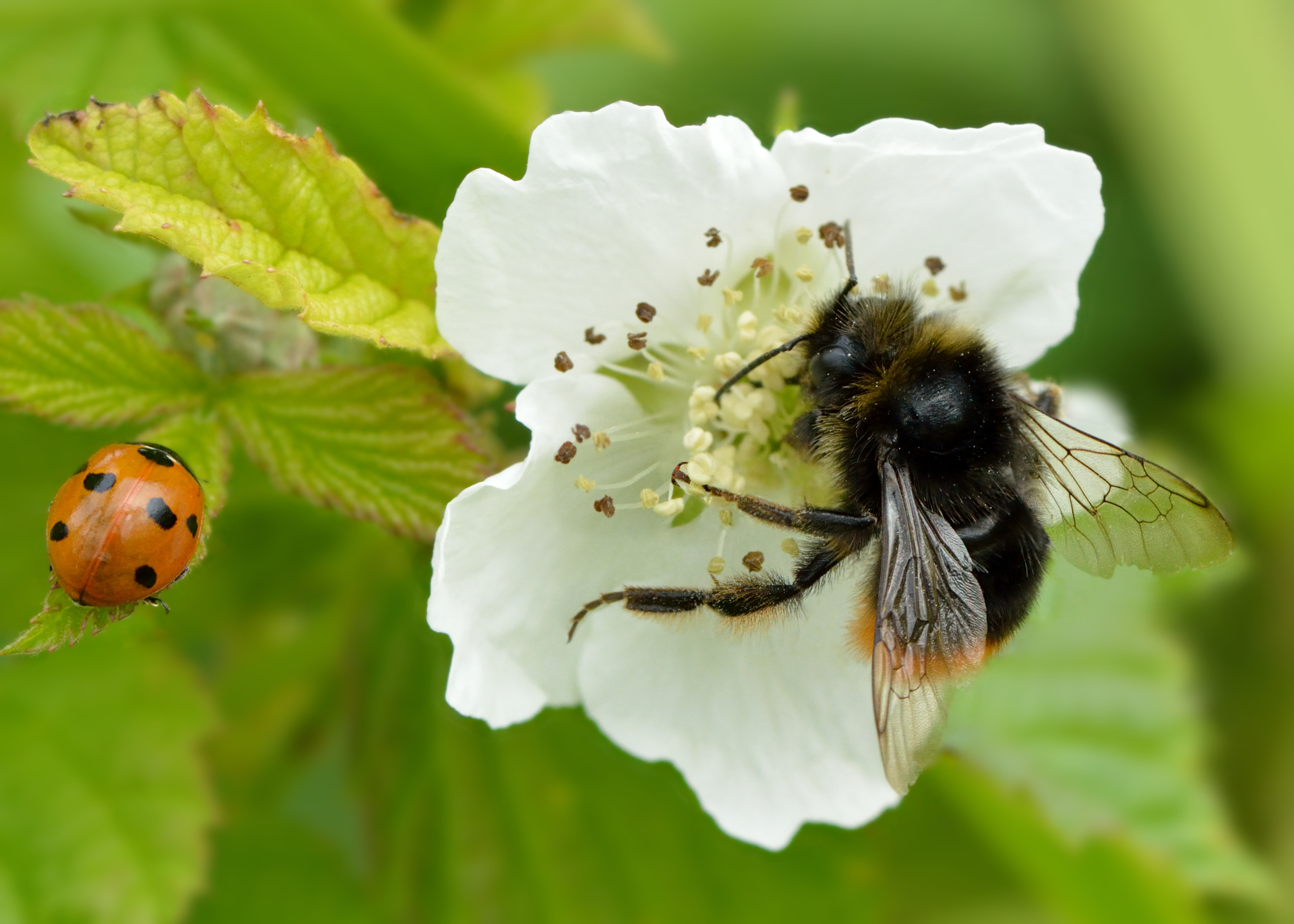
Red-tailed bumblebee on a flower

The dewberry can hybridise with the raspberry (R. idaeus) and the stone bramble (R. saxatilis).

=== Genome ===
Alice et al., 2001 find R. caesius is a tetraploid blackberry which hybridises especially with R. idaeus and others of the genus. Sochor et al., 2015 finds this species has produced many new European blackberry species by speciation by hybridisation with R. idaeus. Carter et al., 2019 find maternal descent is probably from Rubus subg. Rubus.
