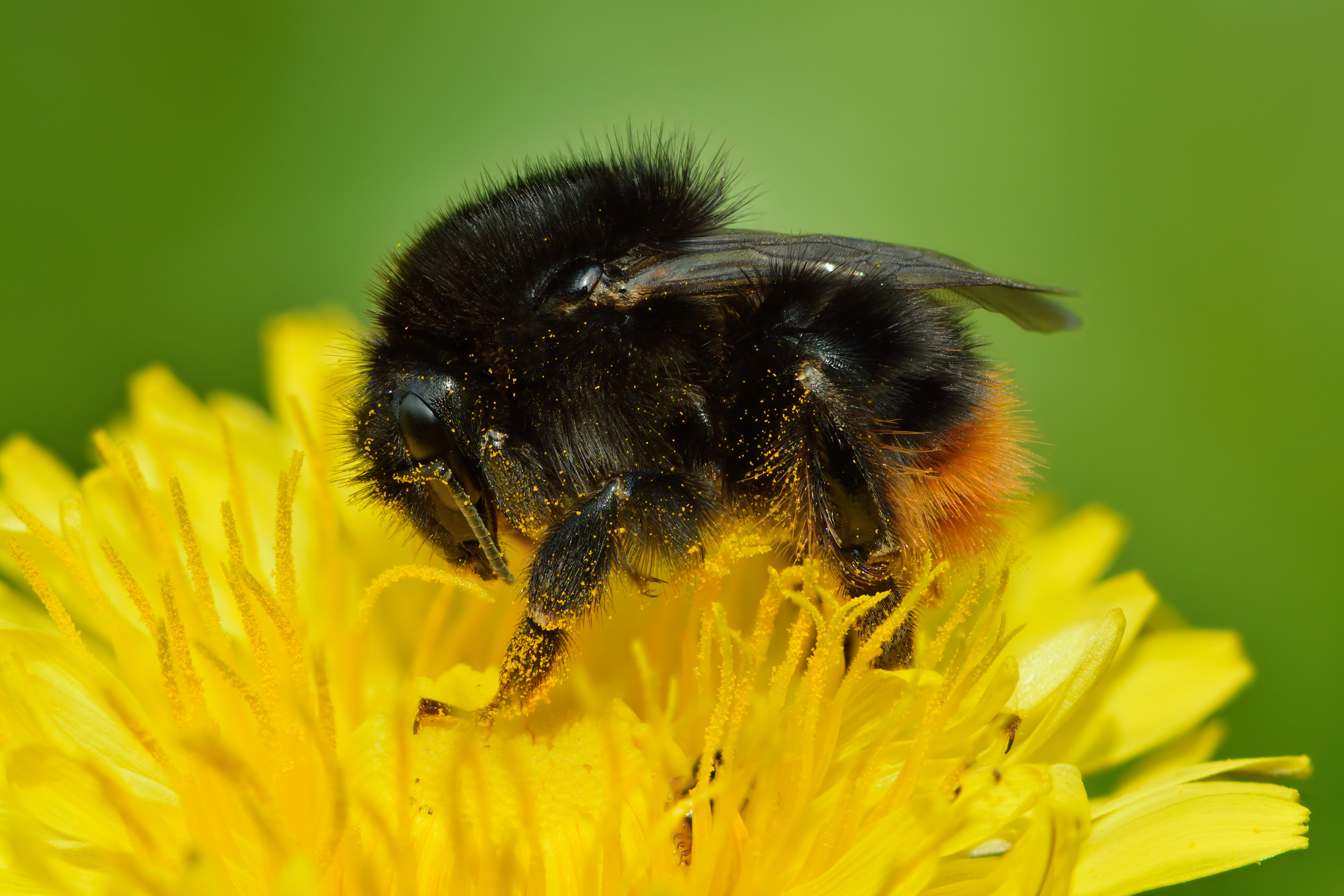

Conservation status
- Least Concern (IUCN 3.1)

Scientific classification
- Domain: Eukaryota
- Kingdom: Animalia
- Phylum: Arthropoda
- Class: Insecta
- Order: Hymenoptera
- Family: Apidae
- Genus: Bombus
- Subgenus: Thoracobombus
- Species: B. ruderarius

Binomial name
- Bombus ruderarius (Müller, 1776)

= Bombus ruderarius =

Species of bee

Bombus ruderarius, commonly known as the red-shanked carder bee or red-shanked bumblebee, is a species of bumblebee found in Eurasia.

== Description ==
Though sometimes mistaken for Bombus lapidarius, Bombus ruderarius varies slightly in appearance from B. lapidarius in several ways. Bombus ruderarius is a relatively small bumblebee with a wide abdomen, an oblong face, and a fairly long tongue. The queen has an average length of 17 mm (0.67 in) and a wingspan of 32 mm (1.3 in), while the other castes are somewhat smaller; the workers have an average length of 15 mm (0.59 in) and the males 13 mm (0.51 in). Their colour is prominently black, with a red tail; among males, however, a lighter form exists with yellow-green hairs on the thorax and the first two terga (abdominal segments). The corbicula (pollen basket) on the hind legs of females (queens and workers) is covered with yellow-red hair.

== Ecology ==
The nest is constructed of grass or moss, on or slightly below ground, and typically contains 50 to 100 workers. Often, old mouse nests in open grassland and scrubs are used. The species can, however, also appear in sparsely built-up urban areas as gardens and wasteland. Food sources include deadnettles, clover, vetch, and legumes as bird's-foot trefoil.

== Distribution ==
This species is found in Europe and northwest Asia from Ireland and Great Britain in the west to Siberia and northwest China in the east, northwards to the Gulf of Botnia and the Arctic Circle in Scandinavia, and southwards to North Africa, southern Italy, Greece, and the Balkans. The distribution is uneven; in North Africa it is considered very rare, while in places such as the east Pyrenees, it is very common, accounting for more than half of all bumblebees in the area. In Britain, it is declining due to lack of habitat and restricted to southern England and western Scotland. It is also an endangered species in Ireland.
