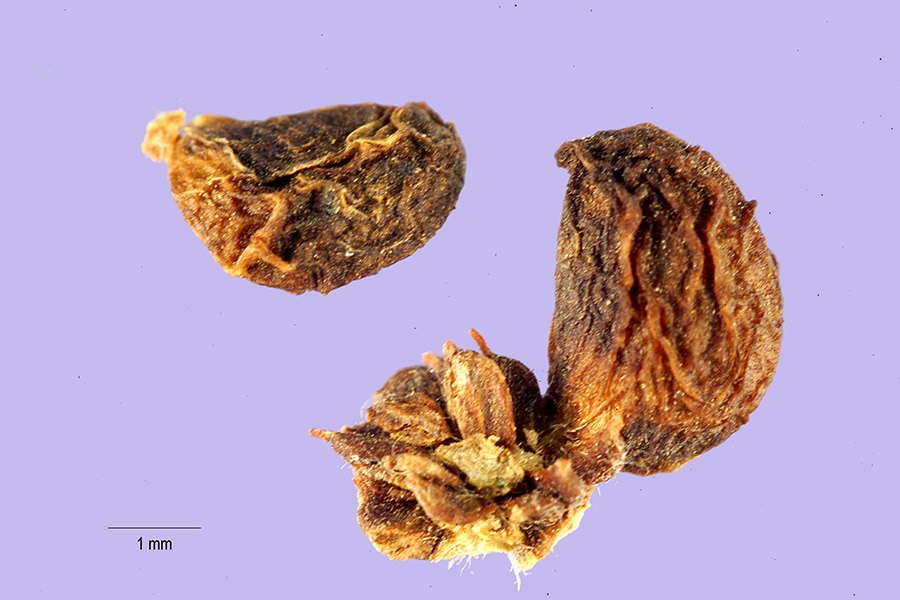
- Rubus macrophyllus seeds

Scientific classification
- Kingdom: Plantae
- Clade: Embryophytes
- Clade: Tracheophytes
- Clade: Spermatophytes
- Clade: Angiosperms
- Clade: Eudicots
- Clade: Rosids
- Order: Rosales
- Family: Rosaceae
- Genus: Rubus
- Species: R. macrophyllus

Binomial name
- Rubus macrophyllus Weihe & Nees 1822 not Gremli 1870 nor P.J.Müll. 1858 nor Cariot 1865

Synonyms
- Synonymy: Rubus bremon E.H.L.Krause; Rubus fruticosus subsp. macrophyllus (Weihe & Nees) Syme; Rubus fruticosus var. macrophyllus (Weihe & Nees) Brob.; Rubus macrophylloides Utsch; Rubus macrophyllus var. megaphyllus (P.J.Müll.) Sudre; Rubus macrophyllus var. wimmeri (Weihe) Nyman; Rubus megaphyllus P.J.Müll.; Rubus pilosus var. macrophyllus (Weihe & Nees) Dumort.; Rubus platyphyllus Weihe; Rubus polyphyllus A.Forst.; Rubus sylvaticus subsp. macrophyllus (Weihe & Nees) Tourlet; Rubus thyrsoideus var. macrophyllus (Weihe & Nees) Fisch.-Oost.; Rubus villicaulis var. wimmeri (Weihe) Fiek; Rubus vulgaris var. cylindraceus Kaltenb.; Rubus vulgaris subsp. macrophyllus (Weihe & Nees) Schübler & G.Martens; Rubus vulgaris f. macrophyllus (Weihe & Nees) Bluff & Fingerh.; Rubus wimmeri Weihe

= Rubus macrophyllus =

Species of fruit and plant

Rubus macrophyllus is a European species of bramble.

The genetics of Rubus is extremely complex, making it is difficult to decide which groups should be recognized as species. As many rare species have limited ranges such as this, further study is needed to clarify the taxonomy.

It can be found across Europe, from Ireland to Bulgaria. There are reports of the species having become naturalized in Washington and Oregon in the northwestern United States.
