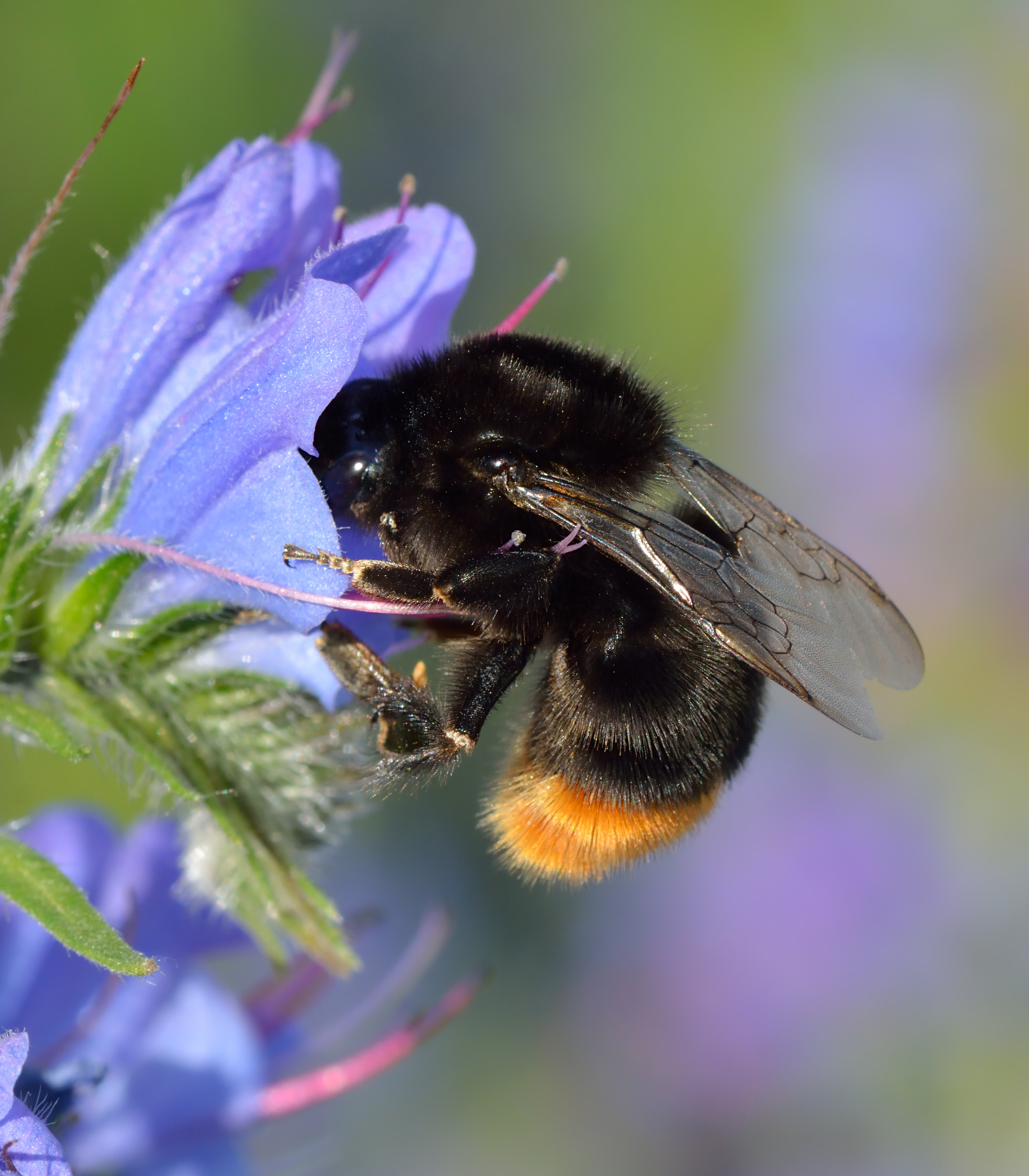
- Queen
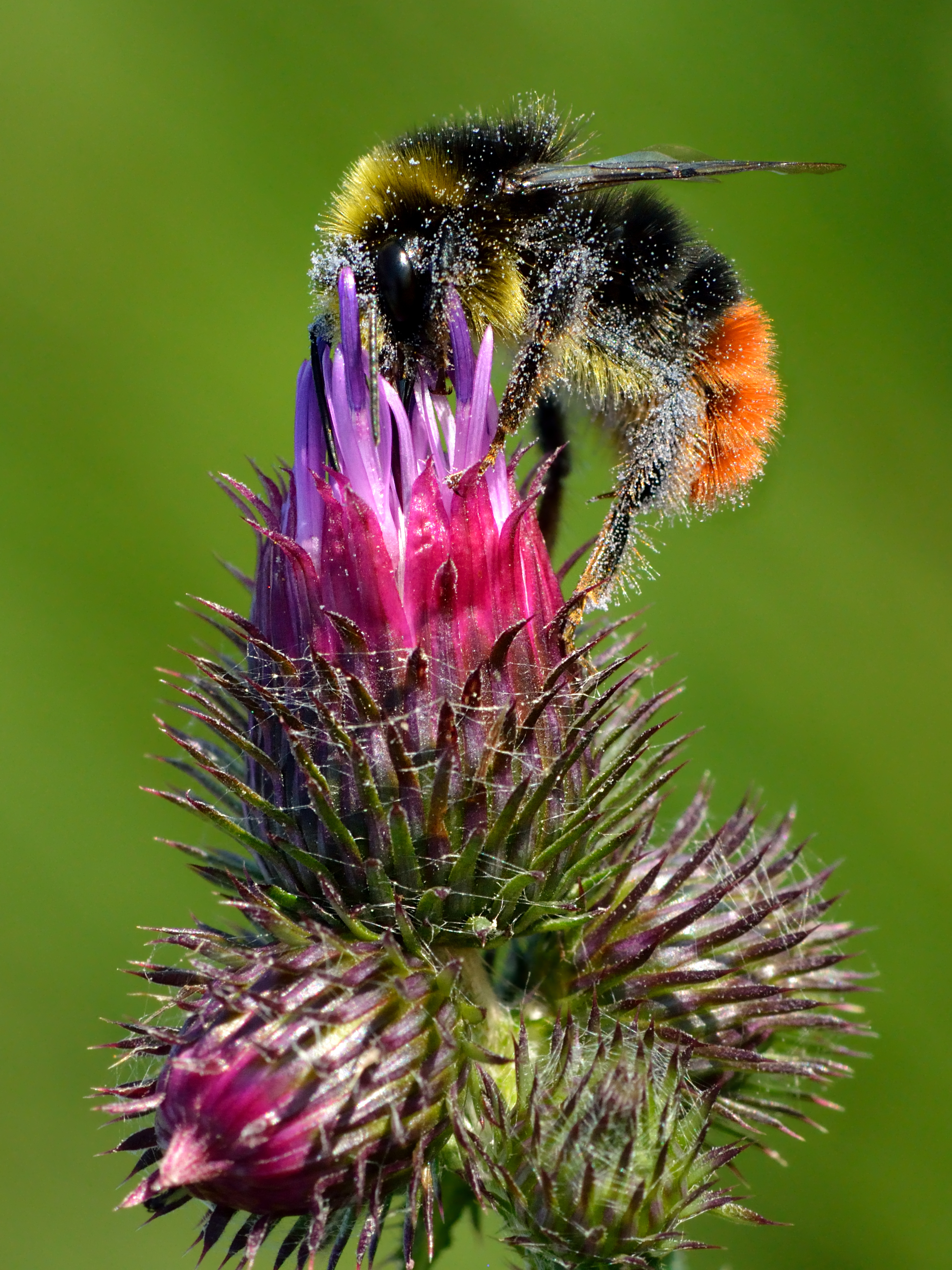
- Drone

Conservation status
- Least Concern (IUCN 3.1)

Scientific classification
- Kingdom: Animalia
- Phylum: Arthropoda
- Clade: Pancrustacea
- Class: Insecta
- Order: Hymenoptera
- Family: Apidae
- Genus: Bombus
- Subgenus: Melanobombus
- Species: B. lapidarius

Binomial name
- Bombus lapidarius (Linnaeus, 1758)

= Bombus lapidarius =

Red-tailed bumblebee

Species of bee

Bombus lapidarius is a species of bumblebee in the subgenus Melanobombus. Commonly known as the red-tailed bumblebee, B. lapidarius can be found throughout much of Central Europe. Known for its distinctive black and red body, this social bee is important in pollination.

== Taxonomy and phylogeny ==
The red-tailed bumblebee is a part of the order Hymenoptera, family Apidae, and the genus Bombus, which includes many species including Bombus terrestris, Bombus lucorum, and Bombus hypnorum.

== Description and identification ==
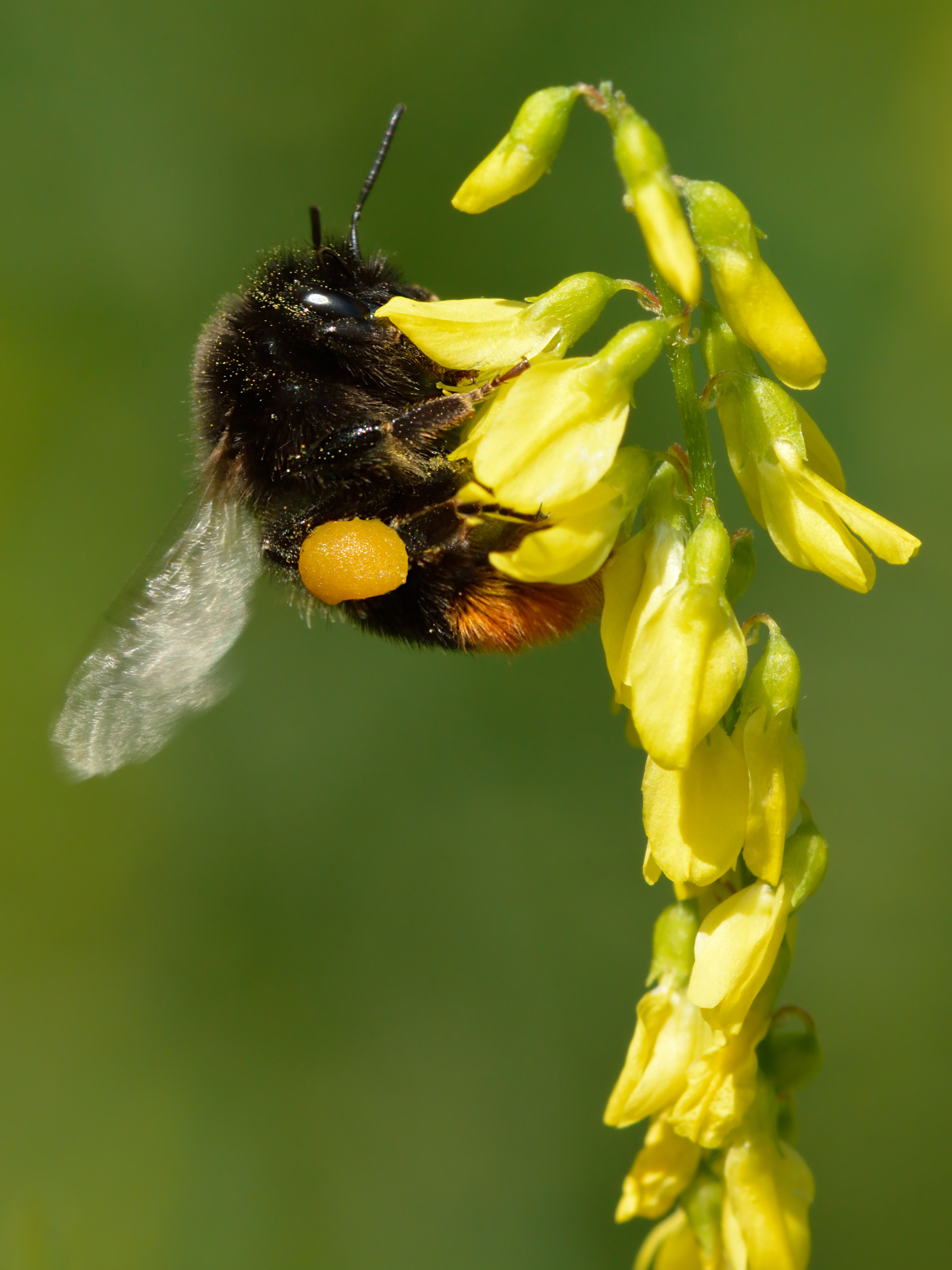
Worker female

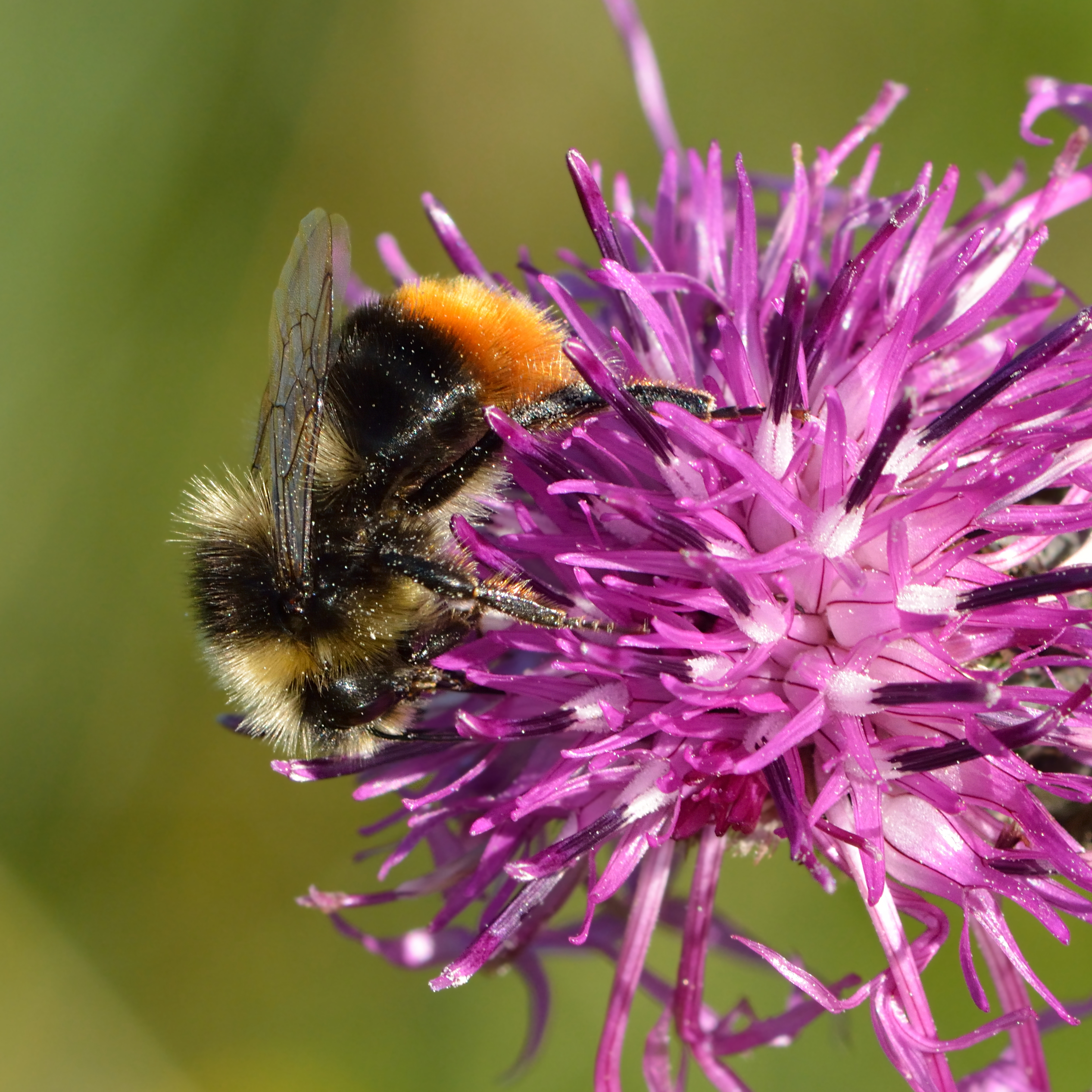
Drone

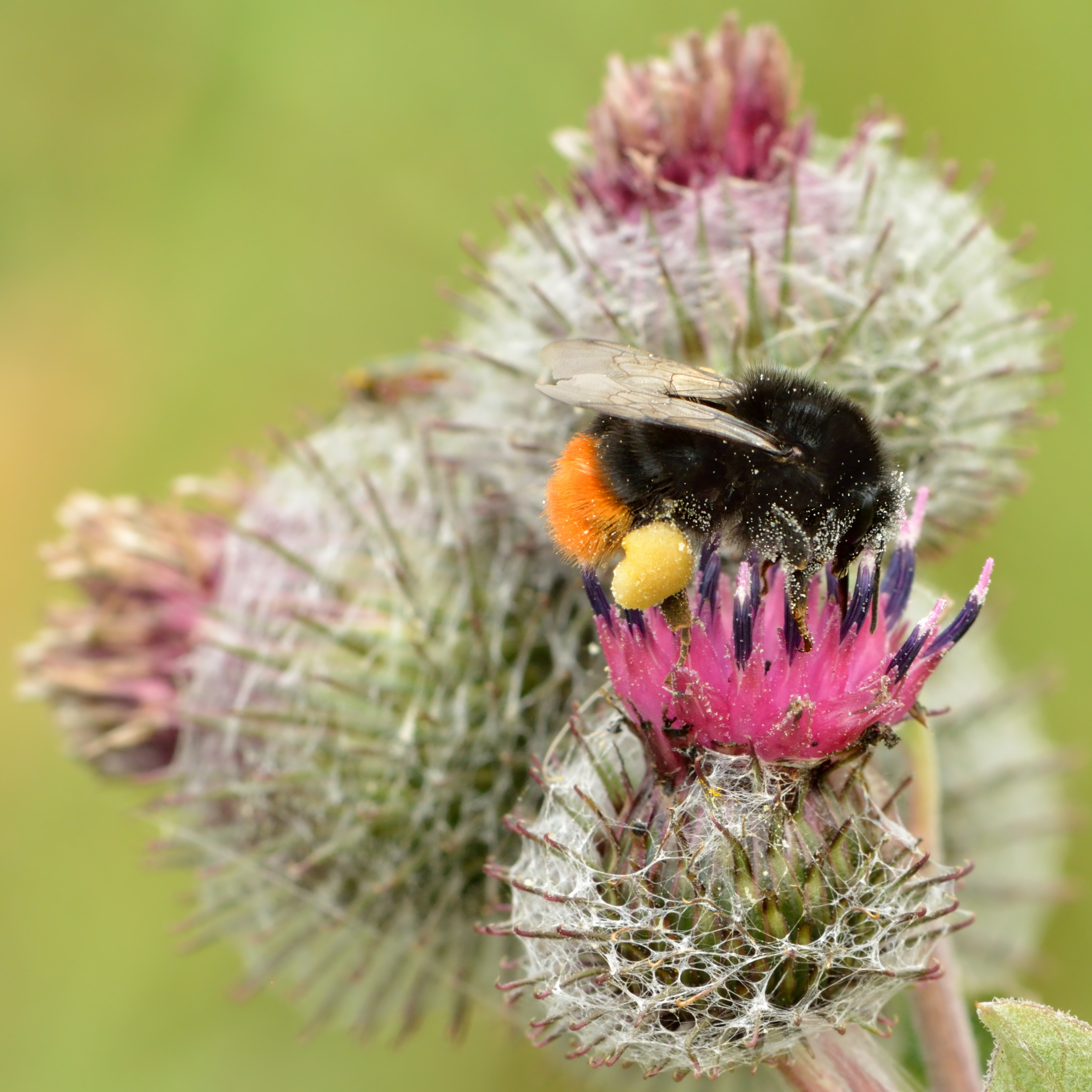
Worker female

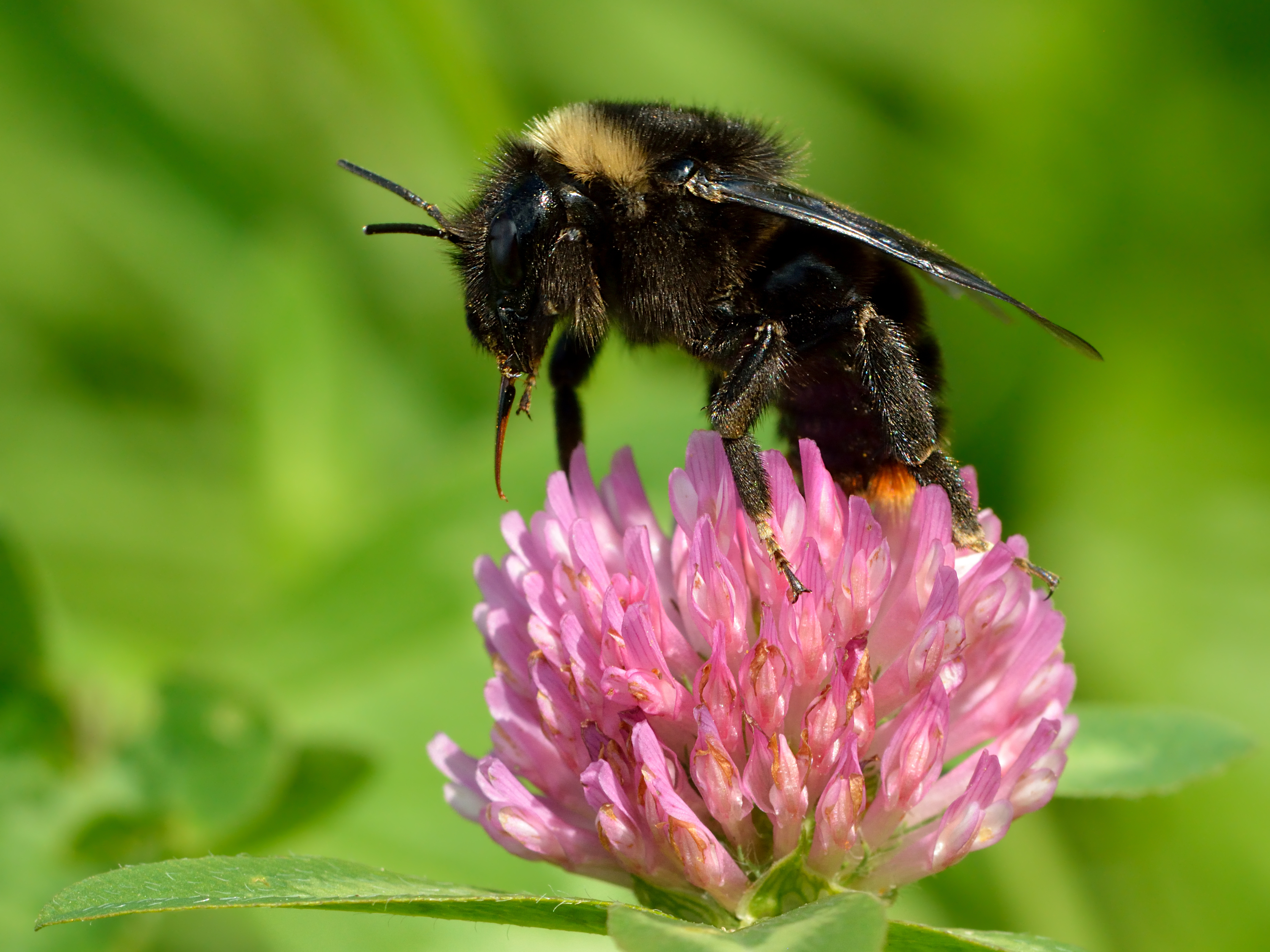
Red-tailed cuckoo bumblebee parasitizes the nests of the red-tailed bumblebee

The red-tailed bumblebee is typically distinguished by its black body with red markings around the abdomen. Worker females and the queen look similar, though the queen is much larger than the worker females. Males typically have the red and black coloration with a yellow band around the abdomen and yellow markings on the face. Further, B. lapidarius tend to have a medium-sized proboscis, which is significant in that it allows the species to be a good pollinator. These bees do not typically form extensive or complex colonies. Nests usually only contain a few hundred bees at most, with an average colony consisting of about 100 to 200 worker bees.

== Distribution and habitat ==
Bombus lapidarius is found throughout Europe, including Britain and Ireland, as well as parts of Greece, Germany, Sweden and Finland. The species has a fairly wide distribution, typically being found in temperate regions. B. lapidarius nests have been found in many different habitats, but the bees usually prefer open terrain to more heavily forested landscapes. They can fly over 1500 meters to better forage for food.

== Colony cycle ==
Red-tailed bumblebees appear in the summer months of June, July, and August. Colonies are initiated via the queen, where workers and males follow roles to keep the colony thriving. Though there is a hierarchy between the queen and the rest of the colony, there does not appear to be a hierarchy among the workers themselves.

== Behavior ==
=== Brood ===
Social bees, including Bombus lapidarius, are able to produce a great deal of heat due to the contraction of their thoracic flight muscles. They are able to use this heat to help warm and incubate their brood. This also allows them to help regulate the temperature of the nest generally.

=== Courtship behavior ===
Red-tailed bumblebee males utilise sexual pheromones to attract females. Males will fly around and mark spots with the pheromone compounds (Z)-9-hexadecenol and hexadecanal via their labial gland. These secretions are highly species-specific, and thus likely greatly reduce inter-species mating. B. lapidarius typically fly and secrete above the treetops, which are more affected by the wind and the sun. Therefore, this species often has to secrete more pheromone than other species to be effective. These compounds have been found in trace amounts in the air around the areas that individuals have scent marked. Different populations in diverse locations (specifically Southern Italy, the Balkans, and Central-Eastern Europe) have experienced genetic differentiation in pheromone composition.

=== Pheromones ===
B. lapidarius pheromones are believed to be “precopulatory signals”, or are used in an attempt to attract mates. These pheromones are often copied by cuckoo species. Red-tailed bumblebee queens also appear to secrete pheromones. Functionally, these pheromones appear to inhibit ovarian development in worker bees, though the true function of the queens' pheromones are still unclear. It is known, however, that their chemical composition differs significantly from worker pheromones.

=== Sex allocation ===
As the red-tailed bumblebee is a member of the Hymenoptera order, the bee displays interesting sex allocation tactics. Studies have suggested that it is the workers, rather than the queen, who control sex allocation. As such, Hymenoptera are known for having haploid males and diploid females.

=== Foraging patterns ===
B. lapidarius has been found to be a fairly dominant species in foraging and has been found to travel as far as 1750 meters to forage for resources such as Phacelia tenuifolia. However, it appears that individual bumblebees vary greatly in the distance they traveled for foraging. One study extensively studied foraging behavior in B. lapidarius. In an almost barren, treeless basin in Germany, the study found nests of the red-tailed bumblebee as well as two other Bombus species within one hundred meters of each other. Each species had equal resource availability. Researchers marked the foraging bees, with almost 80% of all of the foraging bees eventually marked for study. It was found that foraging time was greatest at around a five hundred meter radius around the nest, but time decreased as distance increased past the five hundred meter mark. Further, flight distance was very different among different individuals, reinforcing the idea that specific bees are bred for specific tasks, and that some are more skilled than others. Outside of the differences between individual bees, differences between species were found as well. B. lapidarius, for example, was found to typically forage within a five hundred meter radius of its nest, but some individuals ranged much farther than this, as far as 1,500 meters away. Moreover, the red-tailed bumblebee displayed high “patch fidelity”, indicating that an individual bee was likely to return to a specific location. This species of bee thus can loosely be described as a “long distance forager”, but does not travel as far as some other Bombus species, thus it is typically described as having an intermediate foraging distance. Further, the study noted that body size appeared to be a factor in how far a bee might be willing to travel and concluded that foraging distance would differ most between species.

=== Males and workers ===
Males have been found to travel much farther than workers. This behavior may help lead to greater genetic variation, as populations appear to be diverse and avoid inbreeding. Workers, in comparison, tend to stay closer to the nest. Workers are often invested in cell building within the nest. Furthermore, B. lapidarius workers do not appear to have a hierarchy between them, which differs from many other species. Workers typically build cells, while the queen asserts her dominance over each egg cell. However, since B. lapidarius workers often eat the queen’s eggs, this decreases the queen’s dominance. Further, workers that are more aggressive have been found to be more likely to have ovaries, as well.

== Diet ==
Red-tailed bumblebees typically eat pollen and nectar. Workers will sometimes attempt to eat the eggs that the queen has laid. The queen makes a valiant effort to prevent this from happening, but the workers are frequently successful in their attempt. Though the queen does not attempt to injure workers engaging in this activity, she does threaten them with her mandible or sometimes hits them with her head. Further study may be required to better understand this behavior.

The bees have been found to move between specific species of flower, but ignore other species that could be equally rewarding. One study showed that these bees will stay at a particular flower or food source longer with increased levels of nectar available. However, the time spent at any particular flower did not change with different levels of pollen.

== Interaction with other species ==
=== Parasites ===
Bombus lapidarius often experiences parasites, including different species from the Psithyrus subgenus which attempt to usurp its nest. All cuckoo bumblebee species lack a worker caste—instead the female queen cuckoo bee invades the nest of a host species and lays her eggs there. These cuckoo bees utilize different mechanisms via chemical recognition systems, including mimicry and repulsion, to invade B. lapidarius nests. By mimicking both physical traits and chemical secretions, cuckoos have evolved to mimic B. lapidarius species in particular. Typically, species avoid cuckoo parasitism by emitting complex hydrocarbons, which species such as the red-tailed bumblee use to recognize each other. However, cuckoos are sometimes able to copy them in order to introduce themselves into a host colony. Even if cuckoos do not match the B. lapidarius traits in these ways, parasitism can still be achieved via repulsion. Cuckoos can produce a worker repellent, thus allowing the parasitic species to survive within the group. Either hosts raise these cuckoos as their own, or cuckoos invade and become a part of the B. lapidarius colony. Occasionally, Psithyrus queens eat B. lapidarius eggs if their own brood is becoming nutritionally deficient.

=== Mutualism ===
Red-tailed bumblebees are very important in the pollination of many different species of flower and crops. B. lapidarius was found to forage and pollinate at higher temperatures than other Bombus species. This is important for understanding when and where pollination is most likely to occur.

== Human importance ==
=== Stings ===
This species is a type of bumblebee, and thus has the ability to sting.

=== Agriculture ===
The red-tailed bumblebee is a very important pollinator. For many plants, such as certain species of Viscaria, only bees and butterflies have proboscides long enough to pollinate effectively. For example, studies have shown that B. lapidarius have a high feeding density relative to other bee species. B. lapidarius is important in pollinating many other species, including Centaurea scabiosa. A study found that though Apis mellifera was also involved in pollination of this species, B. lapidarius greatly outnumbers Apis and other bee species in pollination. Though initially attracted to flowers by the color, the scent is what drives attention as the bees approach flowers. It has been suggested that some individuals are better able to interpret differences in scent in the flowers than others. These differences in ability may have evolved as different types of bees developed specific roles within the colony. Other experiments have indicated that body size is an important factor in how bumblebees pollinate. It appears that size affects the frequency of a bee's visits to flowers, as well as its pollination skill. Smaller bees seem to pollinate more effectively than larger bees. Nevertheless, there does not appear to be a correlation between floral display size and body size. It has therefore been suggested that bumblebees of all different sizes respond in the same way to floral display size.

== Conservation status ==
Red-tailed bumblebees rank among the most common and most recognized bumblebees of Central Europe, but rarer species, such as Bombus ruderarius, have a similar appearance.

This species is considered Near Threatened in Ireland. It has localized distribution and occurs in coastal dunes and unimproved; it is near absent from agricultural areas. The former habitats are in decline, impacting also this species.

Additionally, it has been suggested that different species of bumblebee understand their surroundings according to different scales. This has important implications for conservation—the differences in species behavior is significant in understanding resource range and differences in foraging areas. Understanding these concepts is vital to conservation and biodiversity. Thus, these bees specifically are very important to agriculture, as they are so important in pollination. Therefore, conservation of B. lapidarius is important to understand.
