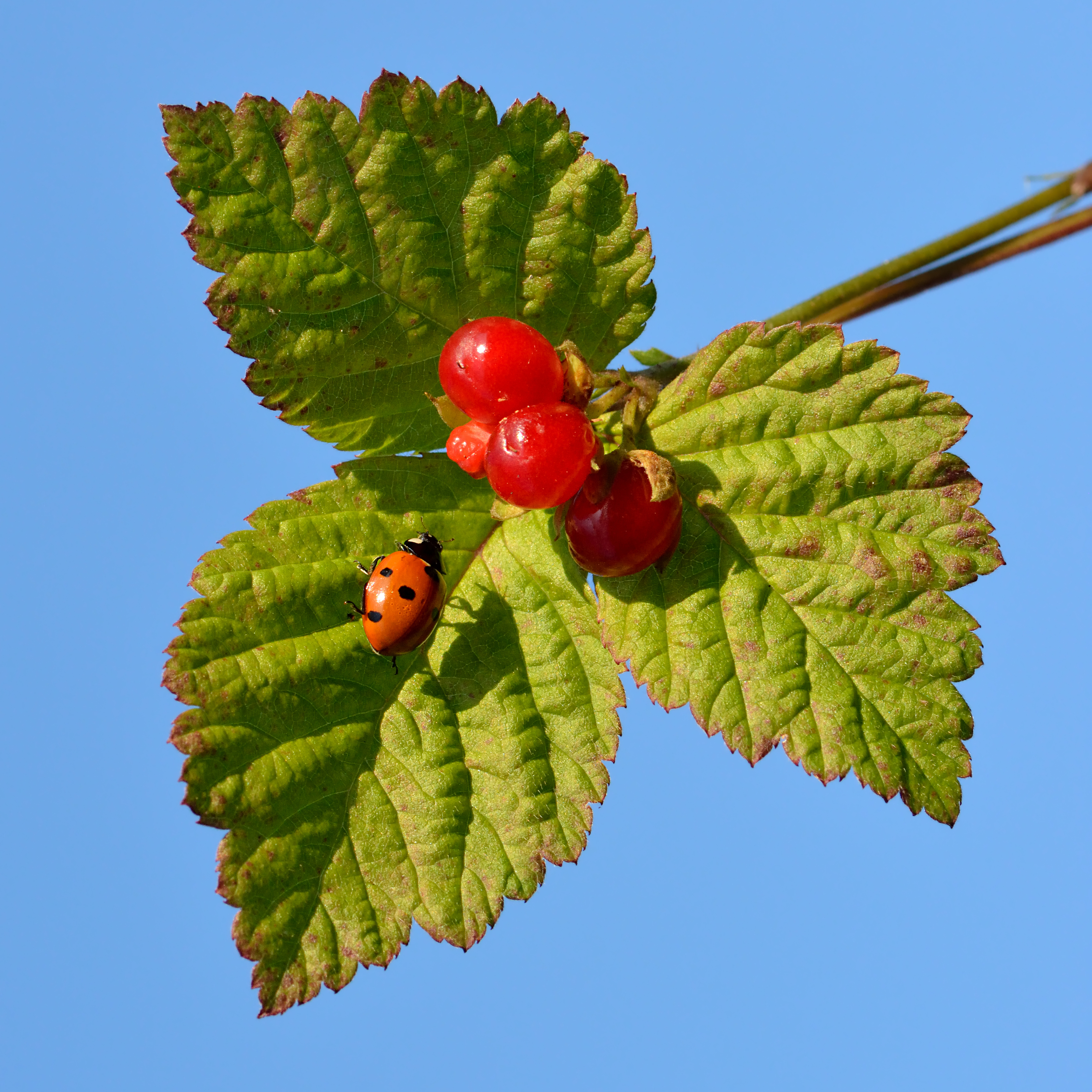

Scientific classification
- Kingdom: Plantae
- Clade: Embryophytes
- Clade: Tracheophytes
- Clade: Spermatophytes
- Clade: Angiosperms
- Clade: Eudicots
- Clade: Rosids
- Order: Rosales
- Family: Rosaceae
- Genus: Rubus
- Species: R. saxatilis

Binomial name
- Rubus saxatilis L. 1753 not Michx. 1803 nor Bigelow 1824

Synonyms
- Cylactis saxatilis (L.) Á.Löve; Rubus ruber Gilib.; Selnorition saxatilis (L.) Raf. ex B.D.Jacks.

= Rubus saxatilis =

Species of plant

Rubus saxatilis, the stone bramble or roebuck berry, is a species of bramble widespread across much of Eurasia.

== Description ==
The stone bramble is a perennial plant with biennial stems which die after fruiting in their second year. It sends out long runners which root at the tip to form new plants. The stems are 20–60 centimetres (8–23 1/2 in) tall and rough with many small spines. The alternate leaves are stalked, usually compound and consisting of three oval leaflets with serrated margins, the terminal leaflet having a short stalk and the other two being slightly smaller.

The inflorescence is a few-flowered corymb. The calyx of each flower has five sepals and the corolla is composed of five narrow white petals. There is a bunch of stamens and there are several pistils. The fruit is an aggregate of several red, fleshy drupes. It is red, 1–1.5 cm (3/8–5/8 in) in diameter, and contains large pips. Its fruit persists for an average of 17.6 days, and bears an average of 2 seeds per fruit. Fruits average 94% water (possibly the highest among European fleshy fruits) and their dry weight includes 29.8% carbohydrates and 1.4% lipids.

== Distribution and habitat ==
It is widespread across Eurasia from Iceland and Spain east as far as China. It has also been found in Greenland.

The stone bramble can form dense clumps, spreading by means of its runners. It can also spread by seed as its fruit are eaten by birds which deposit the seeds elsewhere in their droppings. It flourishes in damp woods and rough places and can grow vigorously in clearings created by felling trees.

== Uses ==
=== Culinary ===
The berries are edible raw or cooked, and have an acid flavor, but are agreeable to the palate. In Russian cuisine, they are eaten plain with sugar, honey, or milk, and can be used in preparation of kissel, kompot, juice, syrup, jams and jellies, and kvass.

=== Medicinal ===
Many parts of the plant are astringent, owing largely to the presence of tannins. A decoction of the root was once used in India for the treatment of relaxed bowels and dysentery, and also in treating the spasmodic stage of whooping cough. A decoction of the leaves was used to treat dysentery and some types of bleeding.

=== Other ===
A purple to dull blue dye can be obtained from the fruit.

== Bibliography ==
- Ehrlén, Johan; Eriksson, Ove (1991). "Phenological variation in fruit characteristics in vertebrate-dispersed plants". Oecologia. 86 (4): 463–470. Bibcode:1991Oecol..86..463E. doi:10.1007/BF00318311. ISSN 0029-8549. PMID 28313326.
