= Chehalem blackberry =

Berry cultivar

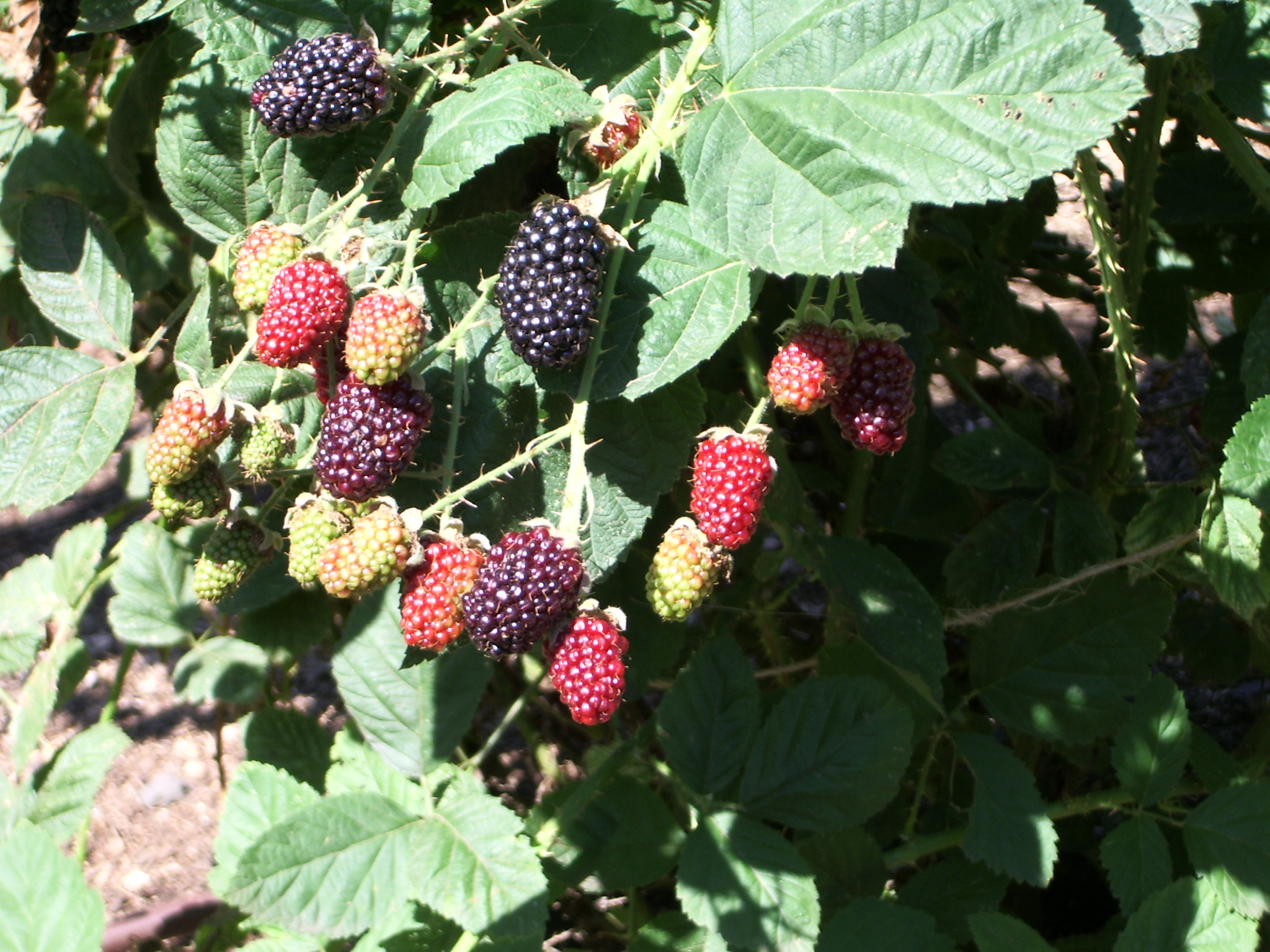
- Chehalem Blackberries
- Hybrid parentage: Himalayan blackberry(Rubus armeniacus) × Santiam berry, (Rubus ursinus × Loganberry)
- Breeder: George F. Waldo in 1936
- Origin: Corvallis, Oregon United States

The Chehalem berry is a cross between the Himalayan blackberry and the Santiam berry, which is itself a cross between the California blackberry and the loganberry.

It was first bred in 1936 by George F. Waldo of the USDA, who also developed the Olallie and Marion berries. The Chehalem berry is smaller than the loganberry with bright skin, a shiny black color and small seeds. The flavor is strong and especially good for frozen products.

The word Chehalem is derived from Kalapuyan word to a group of the Atfalati tribe in 1877. It is also the name of the highest mountains in the Willamette Valley, near Portland.

The berry is well adapted to the Pacific Coast, (of USA) and is vigorous and productive in moist, rich soil. It has been grown to some extent commercially in Oregon.

== Chehalem pedigree ==
Red Antwerp; Raspberry	Aughinbaugh; Pacific Blackberry
Crandall; Eastern Blackberry	Cuthbert; Red Raspberry
Pacific; Blackberry	Loganberry	Mayes; Dewberry	Phenomenal
Santiam	Himalayan; Blackberry	Black Logan	Youngberry
Chehalem; Blackberry	Olallieberry
Marionberry
