= Olallieberry =

Blackberry variety

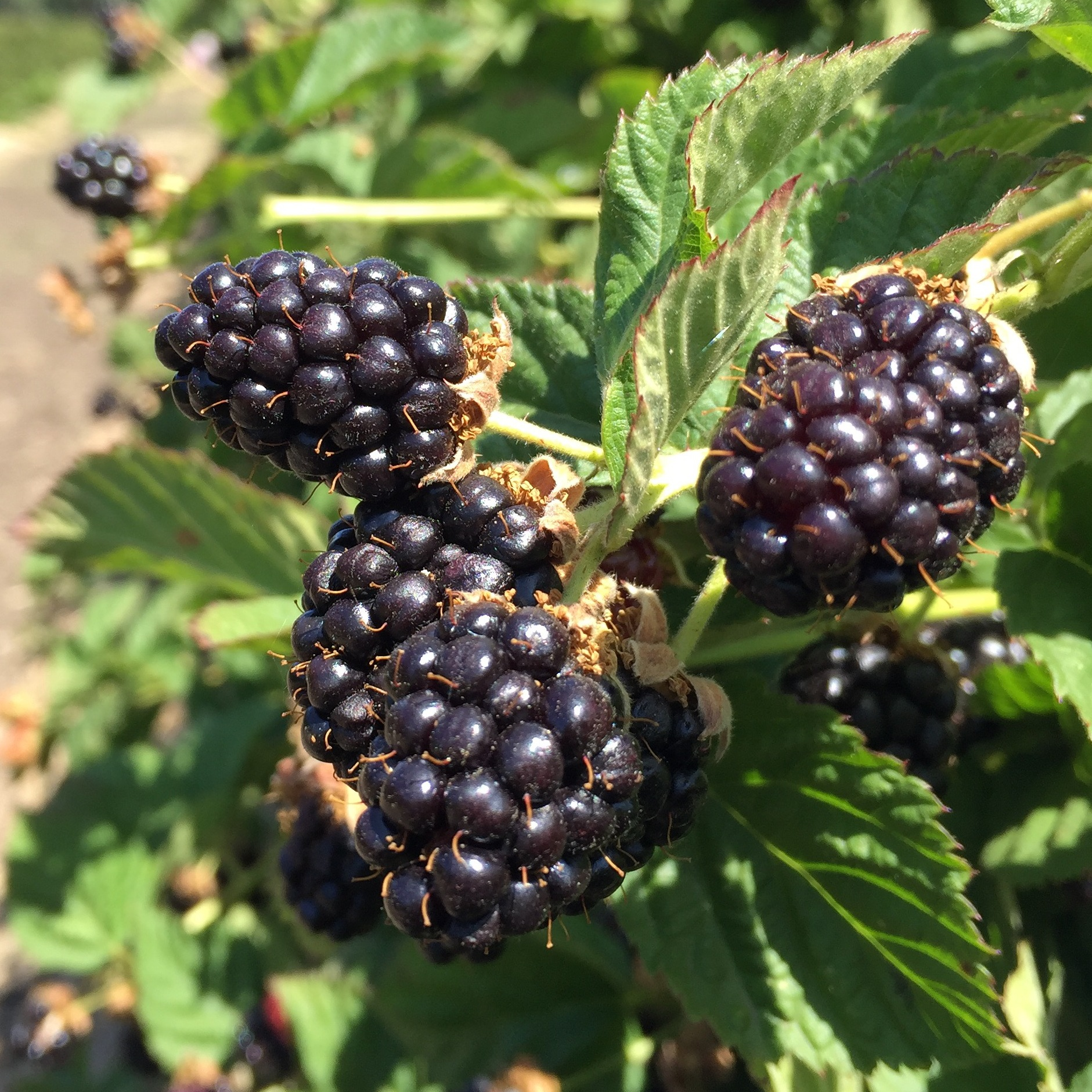
- Ripe olallieberries
- Genus: Rubus
- Hybrid parentage: Blackberry 'Black Logan' × youngberry
- Breeder: George Waldo and Judge James Logan
- Origin: Oregon, United States, 1935 to 1950

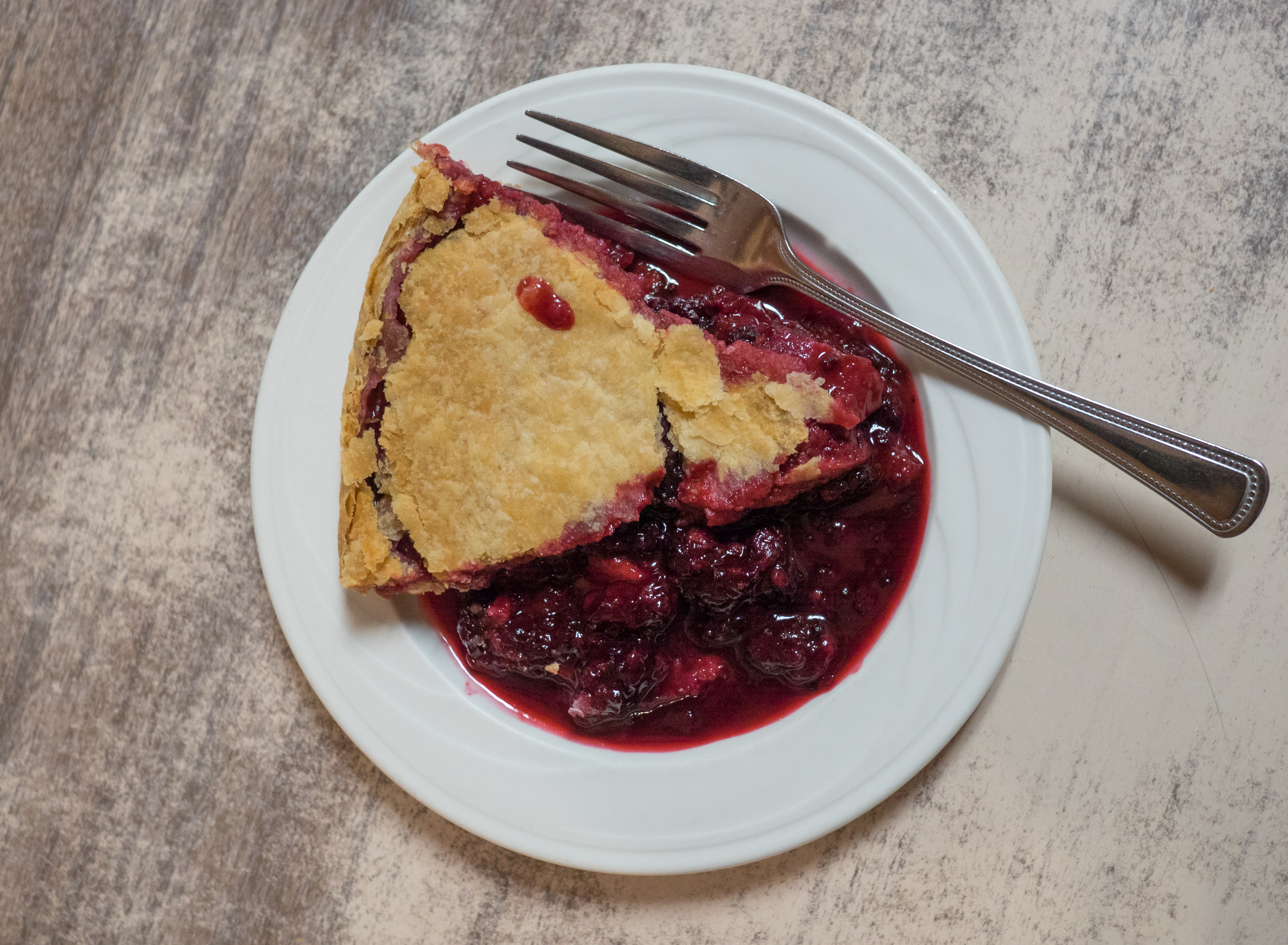
Olallieberry pie in Pescadero, California

The olallieberry (/ˈoʊləliˌbɛri/ OH-lə-lee-berr-ee), sometimes spelled ollalieberry, olallaberry, olalliberry, ollalaberry or ollaliberry, is the marketing name for the 'Olallie' blackberry released by the USDA-ARS (in collaboration with Oregon State University). The berry was a selection from a cross between the 'Black Logan' (syn. 'Mammoth'), developed by Judge James Logan in California, and the youngberry, which was developed by Byrnes M. Young in Louisiana.

According to Judge Logan, 'Black Logan' was a cross between the eastern blackberry 'Crandall' and the western dewberry 'Aughinbaugh'. 'Youngberry' was from 'Phenomenal' x 'Austin Mayes'. 'Phenomenal' in turn is a cross of the 'Aughinbaugh' western dewberry and 'Cuthbert' red raspberry and so has a similar background to Logan's 'Loganberry' because it shares a parent.

== Development and cultivation ==
The original cross was made in 1935 by George Waldo with the United States Department of Agriculture Agricultural Research Service (USDA-ARS), who ran the cooperative blackberry breeding program between the USDA-ARS and Oregon State University from 1932 until the 1960s. Selected in 1937 and tested in Oregon, Washington and California as "Oregon 609" (OSC 609), it was named "Olallie" and released in 1950.

During the 20th century, the Olallieberry was hybridized with the Chehalem blackberry to produce the Marion blackberry or Marionberry, which – when used as the fruit in a pie – was named as the official state pie of Oregon in 2017.

== Olallieberry pedigree ==
Red Antwerp; Raspberry	Aughinbaugh; Pacific Blackberry
Crandall; Eastern Blackberry	Cuthbert; Red Raspberry
Pacific; Blackberry	Loganberry	Mayes; Dewberry	Phenomenal
Santiam	Himalayan; Blackberry	Black Logan	Youngberry
Chehalem; Blackberry	Olallieberry
Marionberry

== In popular culture ==
"Olallie" means berry in the Chinook Jargon. Olallie Lake in Oregon's Cascade Range is named after the Chinook term due to the abundance of berries in that area.
