= Marionberry =

Berry cultivar

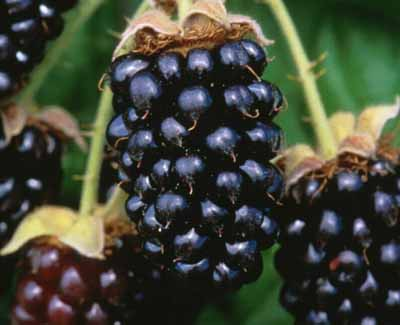
- Genus: Rubus
- Hybrid parentage: 'Chehalem' × 'Olallie'
- Cultivar: 'Marion'
- Origin: Marion County, Oregon, 1956

The marionberry is a cultivar of blackberry released in 1956 by the USDA Agricultural Research Service breeding program in cooperation with Oregon State University. It is named after Marion County, Oregon, where the berry was bred and tested extensively in the mid-20th century.

A cross between the 'Chehalem' and 'Olallie' varieties, it is the most widely planted trailing blackberry in the world. Oregon accounts for over 90% of the worldwide acreage of marionberries.

== Description and flavor ==
Marionberries may be called caneberries due to their typical extensive growth on long canes (vines) and brambles. Marionberries are an aggregate fruit formed in a cluster of many juice filled sacks called drupelets.

The marionberry plant is a vigorously growing trailing vine, with some canes up to 20 feet (6.1 m) long. The vines have many large spines, and the fruiting laterals are long and strong, producing many berries. The berry is glossy and, as with many blackberries, appears black on the plant, but turns a deep, dark purple when frozen and thawed. It is medium in size and tends to be conical, longer than it is wide. The berry has a somewhat tart, earthy and sweet flavor.

== Development and cultivation ==
The marionberry was developed by the United States Department of Agriculture Agricultural Research Service at Oregon State University in Corvallis, Oregon. It was bred by George F. Waldo as a mix between the small, flavorful 'Chehalem' berry and the larger, better-producing 'Olallie' berry. Both the 'Chehalem' and 'Olallie' berries are caneberry hybrids. Waldo made the initial cross in 1945, selected it as OSC 928 in 1948 in Corvallis, and tested it in Marion County and elsewhere in the Willamette Valley. The berry was released in 1956 under the name Marion – the county where it was first cultivated and tested. It is considered to be a "trailing" blackberry vine suitable for management in cultivation.

Oregon produces 90% of the US grown, frozen blackberries found in US grocery stores, with Marion County and the Willamette Valley collectively accounting for most of that production. The marionberry is well-adapted to the mild, maritime western Oregon climate, with its frequent rains and warm summers.

Marionberries ripen throughout spring and early summer, reaching their peak during July when they are hand-picked or machine-harvested. Some 900 Oregon growers produced marionberries, as of the early 2000s. The harvesting season is typically between July 10 and August 10, with a single acre producing up to 6 tonnes (5.9 long tons; 6.6 short tons) in a harvest.

There is a hybrid variety with boysenberry in Australia called Silvanberry. Classed under the blackberry family, Silvanberry plants have many characteristics commonly found among other blackberry varieties. These plants are long living (15 to 20 years) perennials, hardy and cold tolerant, easy to grow, and productive spreaders.

Although related to a blackberry species considered to be a noxious weed – the Himalaya blackberry (R. armeniacus) which is an aggressive invasive species – marionberries are not invasive because they do not readily germinate to grow new canes from seed. They are commonly pruned and trained on trellises.

== Marionberry pedigree ==
The pedigree of marionberries involves 44% of Rubus ursinus, 25% of R. armeniacus, and 6% of R. idaeus (the red raspberry).

Red Antwerp; Raspberry | Aughinbaugh; Pacific Blackberry
Crandall; Eastern Blackberry | Cuthbert; Red Raspberry
Pacific; Blackberry | Loganberry | Mayes; Dewberry | Phenomenal
Santiam | Himalayan; Blackberry | Black Logan | Youngberry
Chehalem; Blackberry | Olallieberry
Marionberry

== In popular culture ==
Marionberries – as fresh or frozen fruit or in various products, such as jam, syrup or ice cream – are widely consumed and prized by visitors to the Willamette Valley as a souvenir.

The berry was the inspiration for the West Coast League's Marion Berries collegiate summer baseball team, which was founded in 2024 and began to play in 2025.
