= Tayberry =

Berry and plant

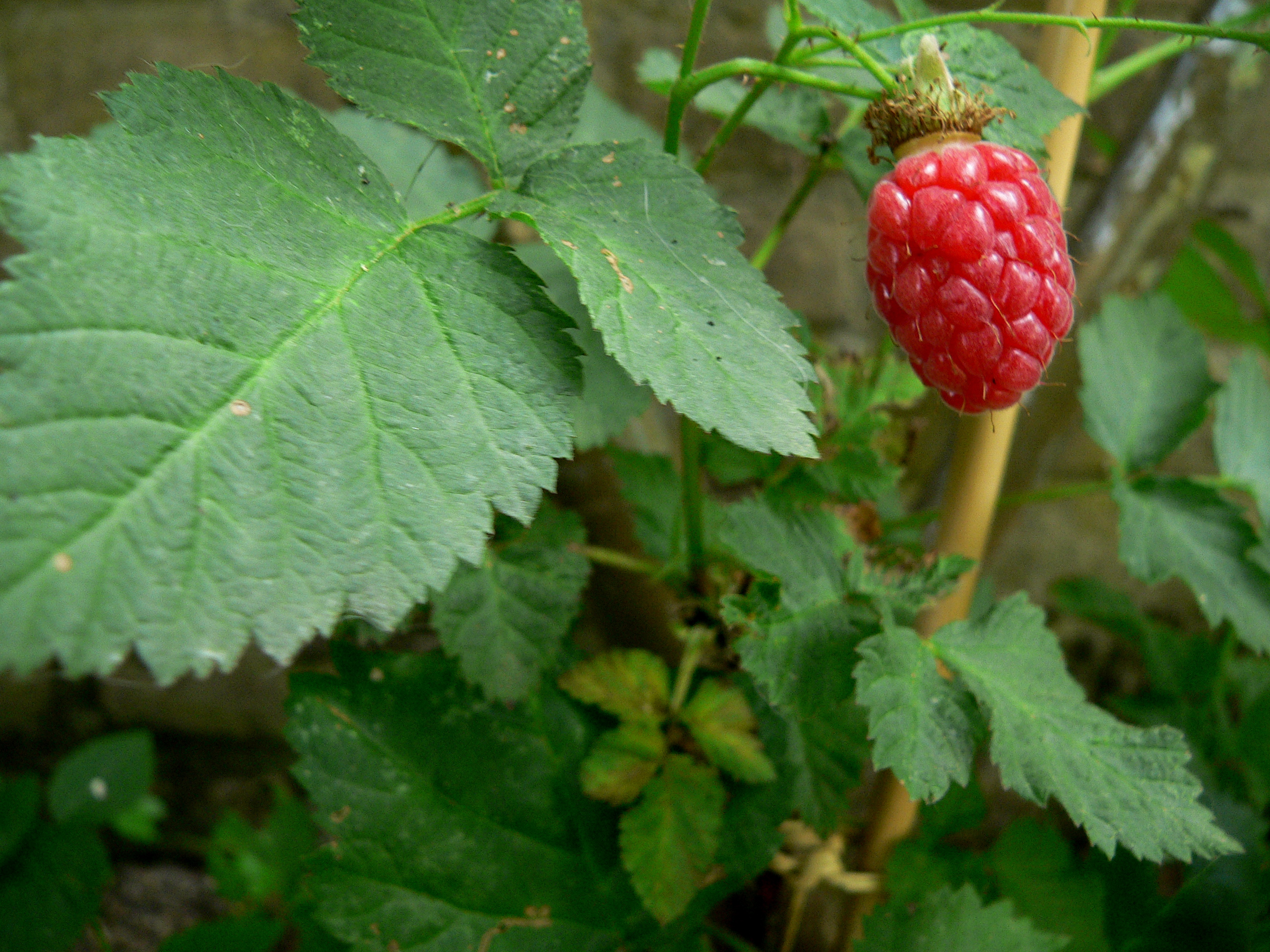
- Genus: Rubus
- Hybrid parentage: Rubus fruticosus x R. idaeus
- Cultivar: 'Tayberry'
- Origin: Tayside, Scotland, 1979

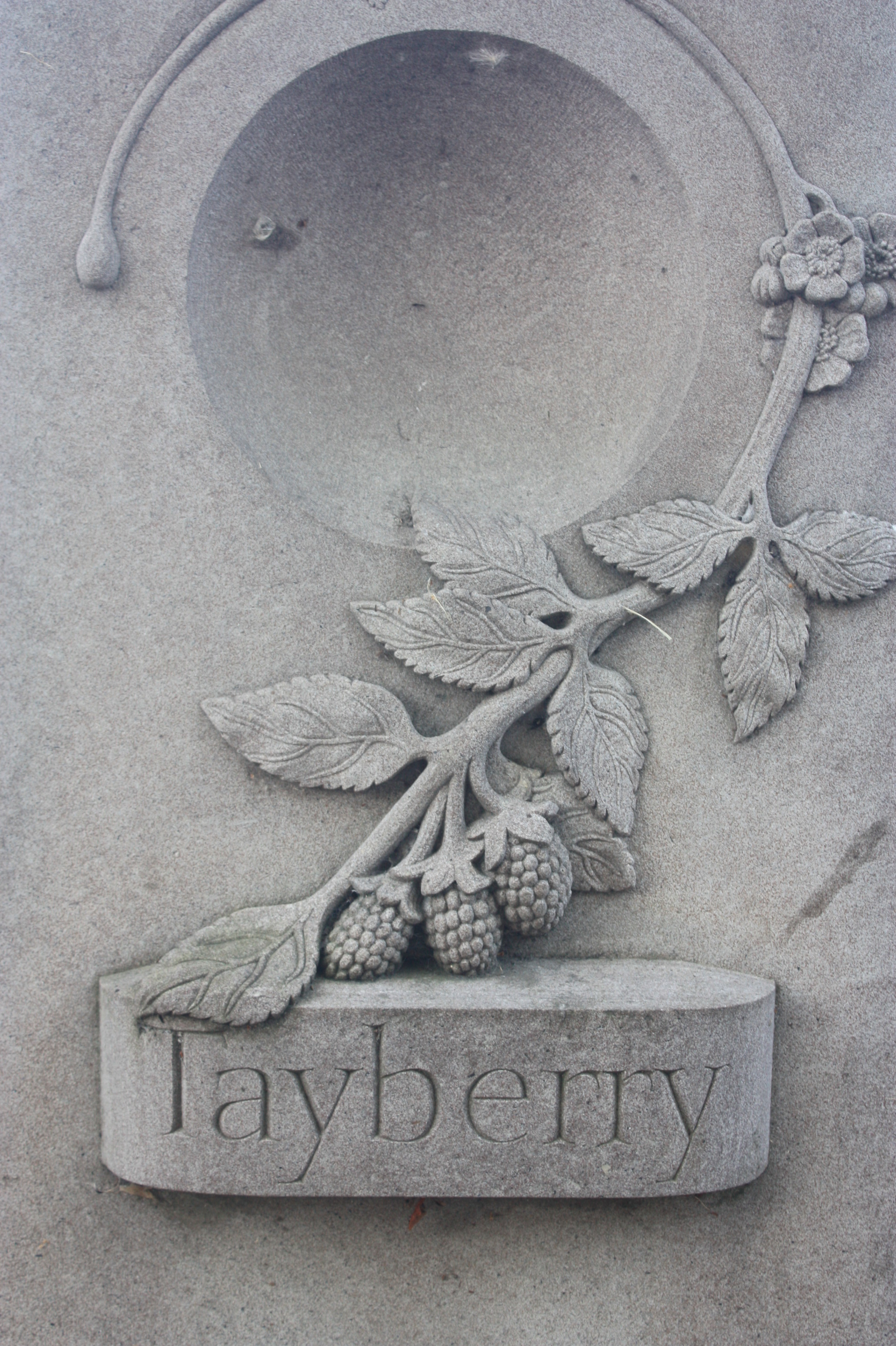
Carving of a tayberry, on the banks of the River Tay in Perth

The tayberry (Rubus fruticosus × R. idaeus) is a cultivated shrub in the genus Rubus of the family Rosaceae patented in 1979 as a cross between a blackberry and a red raspberry, and named after the River Tay in Scotland.

The fruit is sweeter, much larger, and more aromatic than that of the loganberry, itself a blackberry and red raspberry cross. The tayberry is grown for its edible fruits which can be eaten raw or cooked, but the fruit do not pick easily by hand and cannot be machine harvested, so they have not become a commercially grown berry crop. As a domestic crop, this plant has gained the Royal Horticultural Society's Award of Garden Merit.

== Description ==
The mature tayberry fruit – reddish-purple when ripe – is cone-shaped, and can be up to 4 cm (1 1/2 in) long. Similar to the blackberry, the receptacle (the "core") remains in the berry when it is picked. The plant has a growth habit similar to that of the blackberry. Fruits grow on short laterals on prickly canes 1.8 to 2.1 m (6 to 7 ft) long. The cropping period is long, from early mid- to late-summer.

Having a strong flavor, the tayberry is less acidic than the loganberry.

== Taxonomy ==
The tayberry was patented by Derek L. Jennings of Dundee, Scotland. It was intended to be an improvement on the loganberry, which is a chance hexaploid hybrid that received four copies of the blackberry genome and two copies of the raspberry genome. Jennings aimed to replicate the loganberry's ancestry but with improved blackberry and raspberry parents, starting with the American 'Aurora' blackberry which was superior to the Aughinbaugh’s blackberry that was one of the parents of the loganberry. After 5 years of effort, he developed a suitable raspberry and crossed it with the 'Aurora' blackberry. The tayberry was named after the river Tay in Scotland and released in 1979 by the Scottish Horticultural Research Institute, Invergowrie, Scotland.

== Habitat ==
The tayberry will grow reasonably well in many soils. Tayberries produce the most berries when in full sun and in well-drained soil with a high amount of organic materials. Supporting the canes is not crucial, but it will help prevent diseases by improving the air flow between branches. Tayberries should be ready to harvest in early July, depending on the type. Frost is rarely a problem, as tayberries flower late in the season; plants need protection below −26 °C (−15 °F). Like many plant hybrids, tayberries show good disease resistance, and the plant has been shown to be resistant to late yellow rust.

Tayberries are propagated by planting canes; the recommended time is mid-October, though any time up to mid-March may work if soil is not frozen or waterlogged. Scientists have also demonstrated the successful cold storage of tayberry tissue cultures for maintenance of in vitro collections of plant tissues.

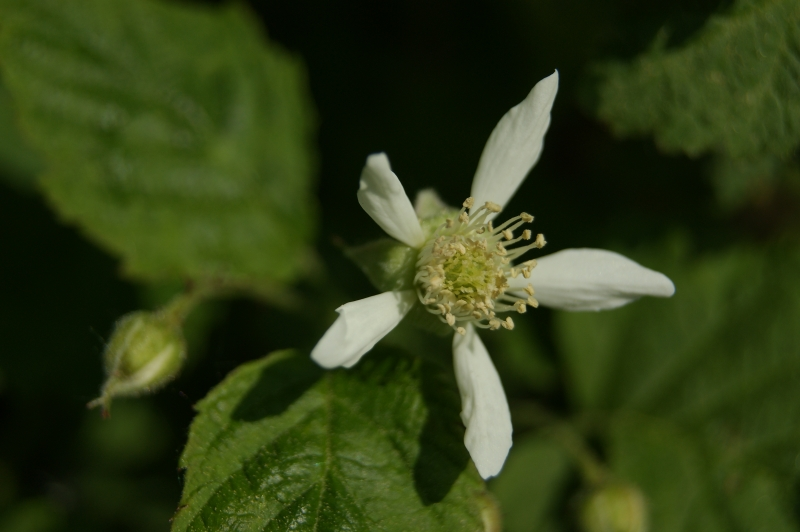
Tayberry flower

== Uses ==
The tayberry can be eaten fresh or used for making jams, pies, wine, or beer.

While it has been reported that a commercial yield up to 27 tonnes per hectare (12 short tons per acre) of berries can be produced, tayberries are very soft when fully ripe, so they cannot be harvested by machine. This has hindered their success as a commercial crop. Tayberries are mainly grown by allotment holders, artisans and back garden growers.
