= Oak Knoll Winery =

American winery in Hillsboro, Oregon

Coordinates: 45.462087°N 122.983575°W

- Location: Hillsboro, Oregon, United States
- Appellation: Willamette Valley AVA
- Other labels: Eruption; Frambrosia; Twilight Blush
- Founded: 1970; 56 years ago
- Key people: Greg Lint, former president Jeff Herinckx, wine maker Kim Kolb, director of operations
- Varietals: Pinot noir, Pinot gris, Chardonnay, Niagara, Riesling
- Distribution: national
- Tasting: Open to public
- Website: www.oakknollwinery.com

Oak Knoll Winery is a privately held winery located in the Tualatin Valley near Hillsboro, Oregon, United States. Established in 1970, it is the oldest winery in Washington County, and produces Pinot noir, Pinot gris, and Chardonnay. The winery also known for producing Frambosia, a red raspberry wine.

Oak Knoll does not have its own vineyards, instead purchasing grapes from area Willamette Valley grape producers.

== History ==
The winery was established in 1970 by Marjorie and Ron Vuylsteke south of Hillsboro on what was formerly a dairy farm. The couple first started making wine in their garage, after they had a bumper crop of blackberries. At the time, Ron was an electrical engineer. As they became more successful in making wine, they started their business with financial backing from a silent partner.

It was the first winery in Washington County. In its early years, the winery used repurposed Coca-Cola drums for storing the wine during the fermentation process. The first batch consisted of 4,000 gallons of blackberry fruit wine. The winery's first Pinot noir was produced in 1973. Chardonnay and Riesling were introduced in 1975 and Pinot gris was first produced in 1990.

Oak Knoll was the first winery in Washington County to open a tasting room. By 1986, the winery was the second-largest by volume sold in Oregon, but slipped to third by 1988. The Washington Post named the winery's Pinot noir some of the best Pinot noir from the United States in 1986. Oak Knoll produced other fruit wines, such as loganberry, and in 1998, its Oak Knoll raspberry "Frambrosia" was named one of the world's best dessert wines in USA Today. In 2005, the Vuylstekes sold part of the winery to their sons Tom and John. In 2006, the winery was the largest in Washington County with 30,000 cases produced each year.

== Business ==
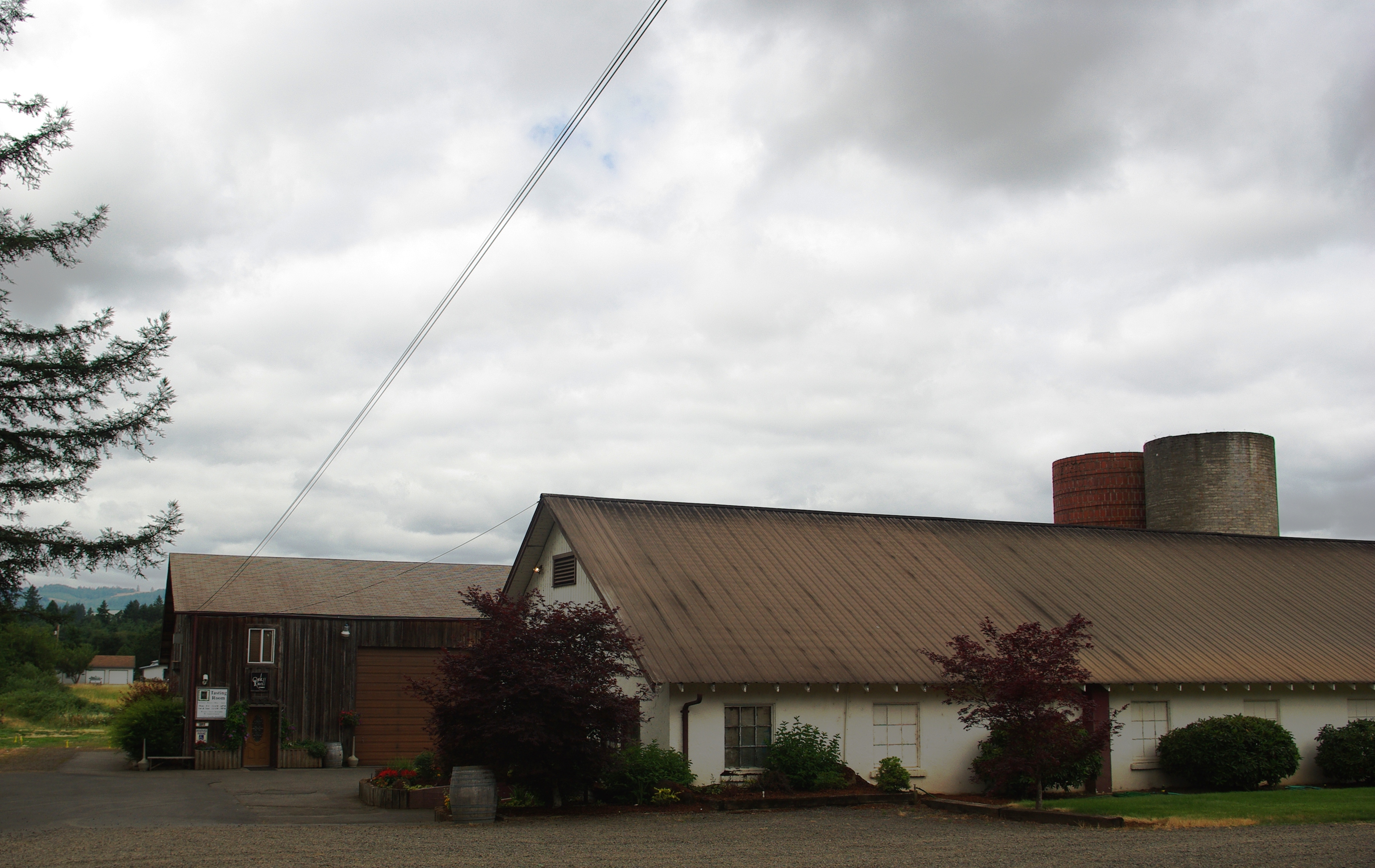
Winery and tasting room

Oak Knoll uses grapes from within the Willamette Valley AVA to produce its wines. The winery is a family-run enterprise with Greg Lint serving as president until his death in September 2022. As of 2007, it had annual revenues of $7.5 million, selling varieties including Chardonnay, Pinot noir, Niagara, and Pinot gris under its own label as well as under the Twilight Blush, Eruption, and Frambrosia labels. The winery is the official wine sponsor of the Portland Rose Festival.

== Accolades ==
- Oak Knoll's wine has been served at the White House
- 1989 Oregon State Fair: Two gold medals and four bronze medals
- 1990 Pacific Northwest Wine & Food Festival: Silver medal for its 1988 Chardonnay
- 1991 San Diego National Wine Competition: Gold medal for its 1988 Pinot noir
- 1998 Oregon State Fair: One silver and two bronze medals
- 2001 Oak Knoll Winery ranked 10th among the Top 25 Oregon wineries by volume
- 2003 Pacific Coast Oyster Wine Competition: Ninth place for its 2001 Pinot Gris
- 2006 The Dallas Morning News Wine Competition: Two bronze medals
- 2007 Pacific Rim Wine Competition: White wine category, winner for its sweet Niagara grape wine
