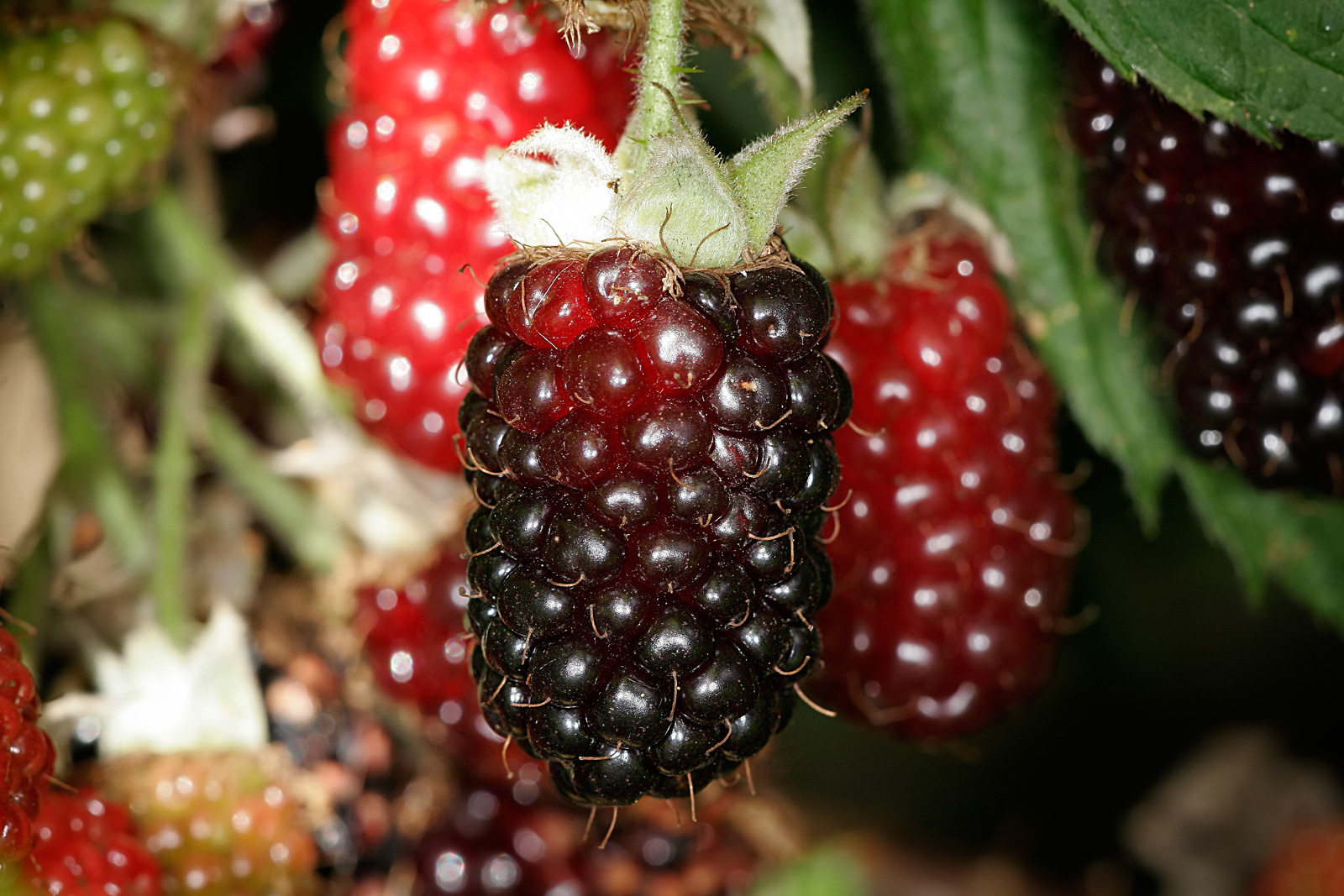
- Boysenberries in various stages of development

Scientific classification
- Kingdom: Plantae
- Clade: Tracheophytes
- Clade: Angiosperms
- Clade: Eudicots
- Clade: Rosids
- Order: Rosales
- Family: Rosaceae
- Tribe: Rubeae
- Genus: Rubus
- Subgenus: Rubus
- Species: R. ursinus × R. idaeus

= Boysenberry =

Rubus ursinus × R. idaeus

Hybrid species of berry

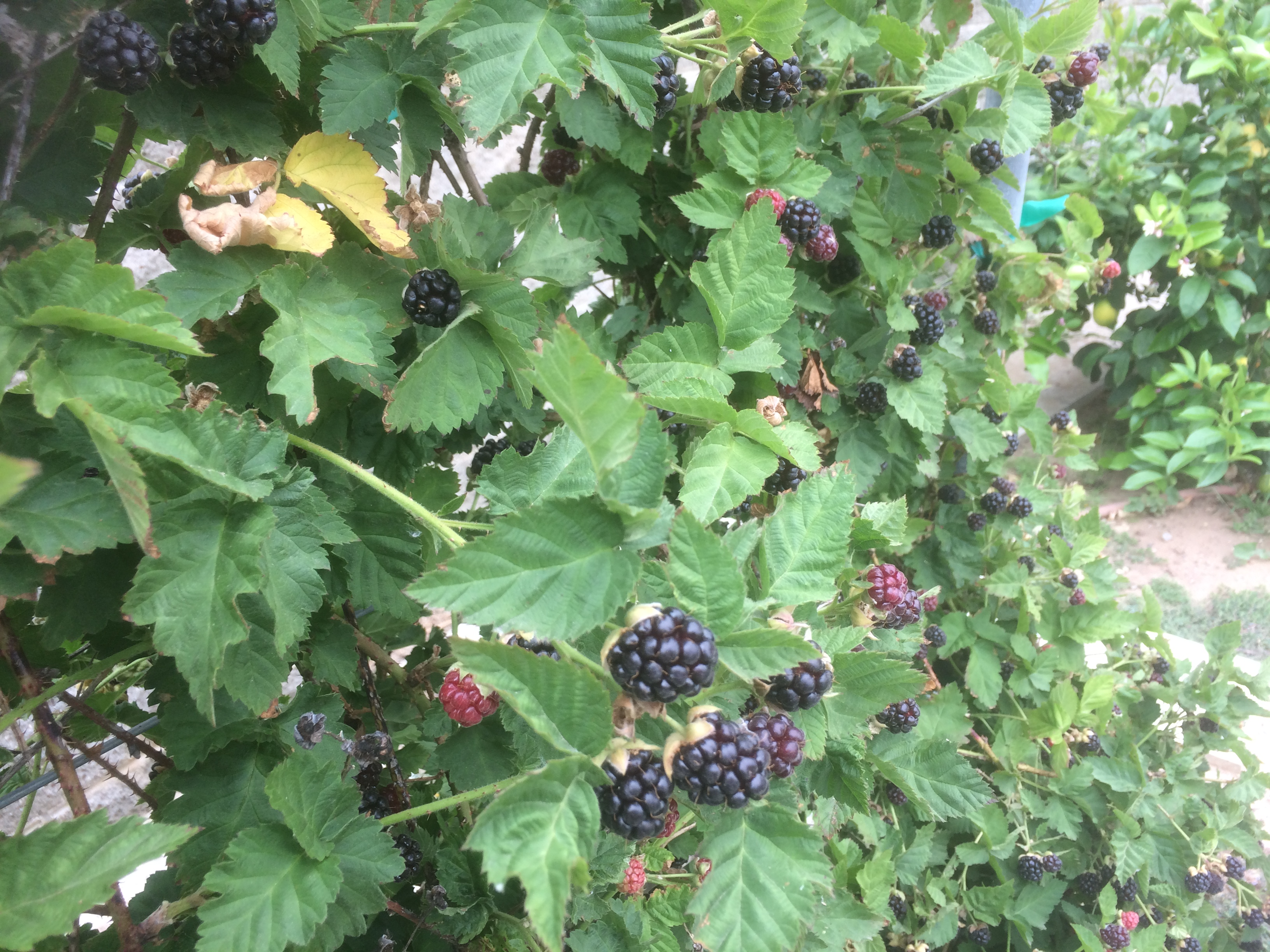
Boysenberry, June - Los Angeles, California

The boysenberry (/ˈbɔɪzənbɛri/) is a cross between the European raspberry (Rubus idaeus), European blackberry (Rubus fruticosus), American dewberry (Rubus aboriginum), and loganberry (Rubus × loganobaccus).

== Description ==
Boysenberries grow on low, trailing plants. It is a large aggregate fruit with a deep maroon color, weighing 8 grams (0.28 oz) and containing large seeds. The fruits are characterized by their soft texture, thin skins, and sweet-tart flavor. Mature fruits leak juice very easily and can start to decay within a few days of harvest.

== History ==
The exact origins of the boysenberry are unclear, but the most definite records trace the plant as it is known today back to grower Rudolph Boysen, who obtained the dewberry–loganberry parent from the farm of John Lubben.

In the late 1920s, George M. Darrow of the United States Department of Agriculture began tracking down reports of a large, reddish-purple berry that had been grown on Boysen's farm in Anaheim, California. Darrow enlisted the help of Walter Knott, another farmer, who was known as a berry expert. Knott had never heard of the new berry, but he agreed to help Darrow in his search.

Darrow and Knott learned that Boysen had abandoned his growing experiments several years earlier and sold his farm. Undaunted by this news, Darrow and Knott headed out to Boysen's old farm, on which they found several frail vines surviving in a field choked with weeds. They transplanted the vines to Knott's farm in Buena Park, California, where he nurtured them back to fruit-bearing health. Walter Knott was the first to commercially cultivate the berry in Southern California.

He began selling the large berries at his farm stand in 1932 and soon noticed that people kept returning for more. When asked what they were called, Knott said, "Boysenberries", after their originator. His family's small restaurant and pie business eventually grew into Knott's Berry Farm.

By 1940, 599 acres (242 ha) of land in California were dedicated to boysenberries. The number dipped during World War II but peaked again in the 1950s at about 2,400 acres (970 ha), to the point where boysenberry crops exceeded those of the (previously) more common raspberry and blackberry. By the 1960s, the boysenberry began to fall out of favor due to a combination of being difficult to cultivate, susceptible to fungal diseases in coastal growing areas, and too soft and delicate to easily ship without damage, as well as having a short season of availability compared with newer cultivars. In the 1980s, breeding efforts in New Zealand combined cultivars and germplasm from California with Scottish sources to create five new thornless varieties.

As of the early 2000s, fresh boysenberries were generally only grown for market by smaller California farmers and sold from local farm stands and markets. Most commercially grown boysenberries, primarily from Oregon, are processed into other products such as jam, pie, juice, syrup, and ice cream. As of 2016, New Zealand was the world's largest producer and exporter of boysenberries.

== Cultivation ==
As a raspberry-blackberry hybrid, the boysenberry plant prefers direct sun in fertile, loam soil with good drainage in the pH range of 5.6 to 6.5. For optimal crop management, nitrogen fertilization is used initially, with rows of berries spaced at 8–10 ft (2.4–3.0 m) and individual plants 2–2.5 ft (0.61–0.76 m) apart, typically supported on a trellis. Mulch is used for weed control and to preserve moisture. Bees are the common pollinators.

=== Cultivars ===
Since 2007, a hybrid variety called the "Newberry" or "Ruby Boysen", was developed to overcome cultivation challenges that led to the decline in boysenberry popularity, and was marketed through farm markets and retailers in California. There is also a hybrid variety with marionberry called "Silvanberry" in Australia. Classed under the blackberry family, Silvanberry plants have many characteristics commonly found among other blackberry varieties. These plants are long living (15 to 20 years) perennials, hardy and cold tolerant, easy to grow, and productive spreaders.

The 'Nectar' cultivar of boysenberry should not be confused with the nectarberry, Rubus arcticus, a plant native to arctic swamps.
