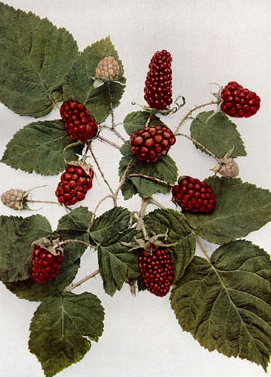

Scientific classification
- Kingdom: Plantae
- Clade: Embryophytes
- Clade: Tracheophytes
- Clade: Angiosperms
- Clade: Eudicots
- Clade: Rosids
- Order: Rosales
- Family: Rosaceae
- Genus: Rubus
- Species: R. × loganobaccus

Binomial name
- Rubus × loganobaccus L.H. Bailey

= Loganberry =

Species of fruit and plant

The loganberry (Rubus × loganobaccus) is a hybrid of the North American blackberry (Rubus ursinus) and the European raspberry (Rubus idaeus), accidentally bred in 1881 by James Harvey Logan, for whom they are named. It is cultivated for its edible fruit.

== Description ==
The plant and the fruit resemble the blackberry more than the raspberry, but the fruit color is dark red rather than black.

== Taxonomy ==
The loganberry was derived from a cross between Rubus ursinus (R. vitifolius) 'Aughinbaugh' (octaploid) as the female parent and Rubus idaeus 'Red Antwerp' (diploid) as the male parent (pollen source); the loganberry is hexaploid. It was accidentally created in 1881 in Santa Cruz, California, by American judge and horticulturist James Harvey Logan (1841–1928).

Logan was unsatisfied with the existing varieties of blackberries and tried crossing two varieties of blackberries to produce a superior cultivar. He happened to plant them next to plants of an old variety of red raspberry, 'Red Antwerp', all of which flowered and fruited together. The two blackberry cultivars involved in these experiments were probably 'Aughinbaugh' and 'Texas Early' (a cultivar of Rubus velox), which were two of the three varieties that Logan had planted in his yard that year.

Logan then gathered and planted the seed from his cross-bred plants. His 50 seedlings produced plants similar to the blackberry parent 'Aughinbaugh', but larger and more vigorous. One was the loganberry; the others included the 'Mammoth' blackberry.

Since Logan's time, crosses between the cultivars of raspberry and blackberry have confirmed the loganberry's parentage, with an earlier theory that the loganberry originated as a red-fruiting form of the common Californian blackberry Rubus ursinus now disproved. Progeny from Logan's original plant was introduced to Europe in 1897. A prickle-free mutation of the loganberry, the 'American Thornless', was developed in 1933.

The tayberry is a similar raspberry-blackberry hybrid. The 'Phenomenal' berry or 'Burbank's Logan', developed by Luther Burbank in 1905, is also a raspberry-blackberry hybrid, but is a second-generation cross (i.e., two first-generation crosses between blackberry and raspberry were then crossed to each other). Other similar hybrids include the nessberry, which is a cross between a dewberry and a red raspberry, and youngberry, a three-way cross between blackberry, raspberry, and dewberry.

The loganberry has been used as a parent in more recent crosses between various Rubus species, such as boysenberry (Loganberry × raspberry × blackberry x dewberry), the Santiam blackberry (loganberry × California blackberry [R. ursinus]), and the olallieberry (Black Logan × youngberry). The loganberry is part of the ancestral line leading to the Marionberry, a common and popular berry grown mainly in Oregon.

=== Relation to other brambles ===
Red Antwerp; Raspberry				Aughinbaugh; Pacific Blackberry
		Crandall; Eastern Blackberry			Cuthbert; Red Raspberry
	Loganberry		Black Logan		Phenomenal

== Cultivation ==
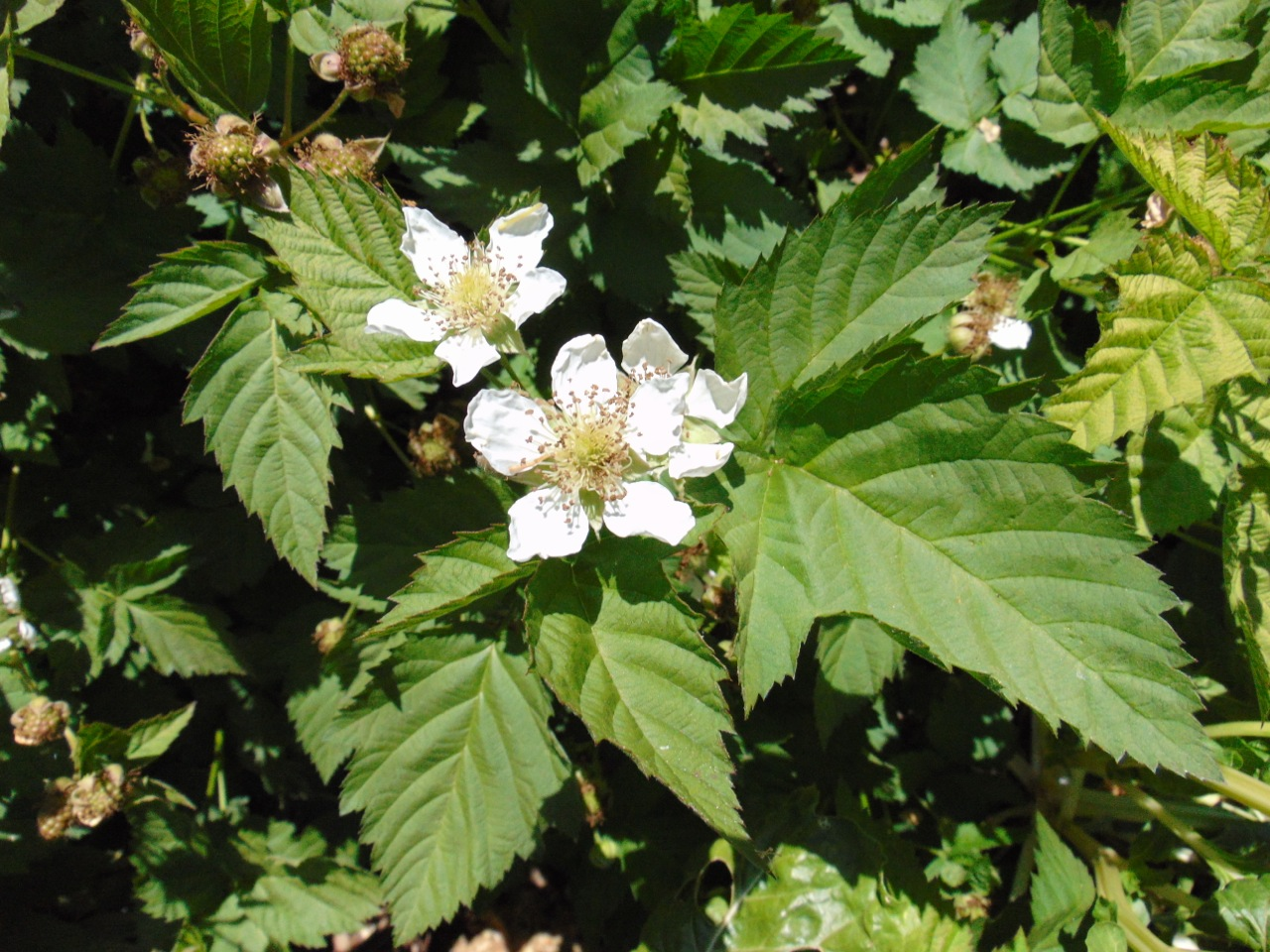
Blossom

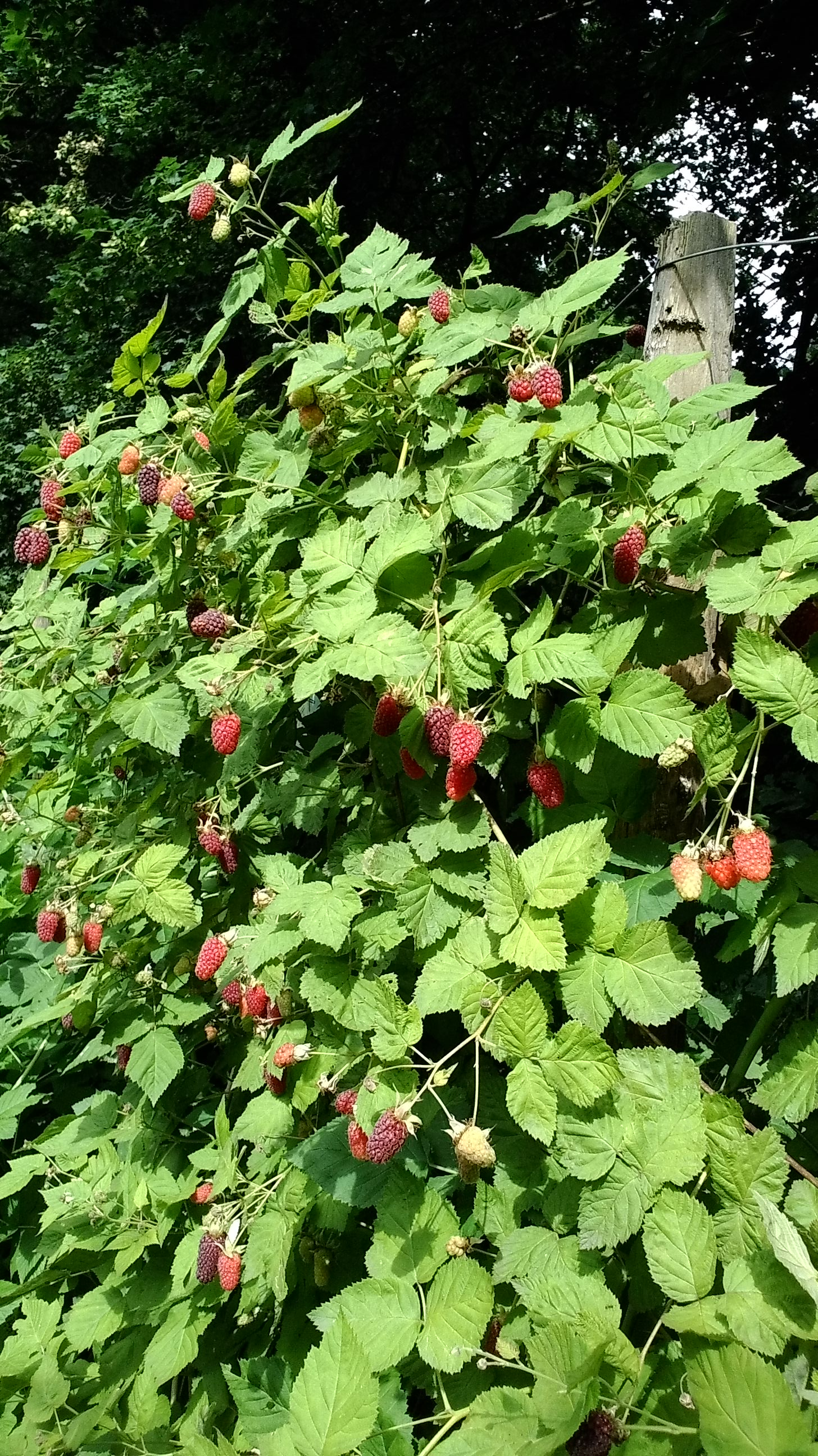
Fruit

Loganberry plants are sturdy and more disease- and frost-resistant than many other berries. They are not very popular with commercial growers, though, due to several problems that increase labor costs: The plants tend to be thorny; the berries are often hidden by the leaves; and berries of varying maturity may grow on a single plant, making harvesting more complicated and less efficient, so loganberries are more commonly grown in household gardens.

A loganberry bush usually produces about 10 canes (vines). The canes are not as upright as its raspberry parent, and tend instead to vine more like its blackberry parent. Growth can be undisciplined, with the canes growing five or more feet in a year. Some gardeners train the canes fanwise along a wall or a wire frame. Old canes die after their second year and should be cut away; they can become diseased, and they also hinder harvesting from newer growth.

The loganberry fruits earlier than its blackberry parent. Fruit is produced for about two months, generally from midsummer until midautumn, with a plant at a given time mid-season bearing fruit in different stages, from blossom to maturity. The berries are generally harvested when they are a deep purple color, rather than red. Each bush can produce 7 to 8 kg (15 to 18 lb) of fruit a year. Plants continue to fruit for around 15 years and can also self-propagate.

The cultivar 'Ly 654' has gained the Royal Horticultural Society's Award of Garden Merit.

== Uses ==
Loganberries are consumed fresh or used for juice or in jams, pies, crumbles, fruit syrups, and country wines.

In the UK, fresh or canned (tinned) loganberries are often paired with English sherry trifle, or their juice (or syrup) paired with the sherry.

Loganberry is a popular beverage flavoring in Western New York and parts of Southern Ontario, beginning there as a drink sold at Crystal Beach Park in Crystal Beach, Ontario. Though the park has long been closed down, several companies still sell varieties of loganberry drinks through stores throughout the area, which are sold at several local fast-food franchises such as Mighty Taco in Buffalo, Sport of Kings Restaurant in Batavia, New York, as well as at supermarkets. Also, milkshakes are flavored with loganberry syrup.

== In culture ==
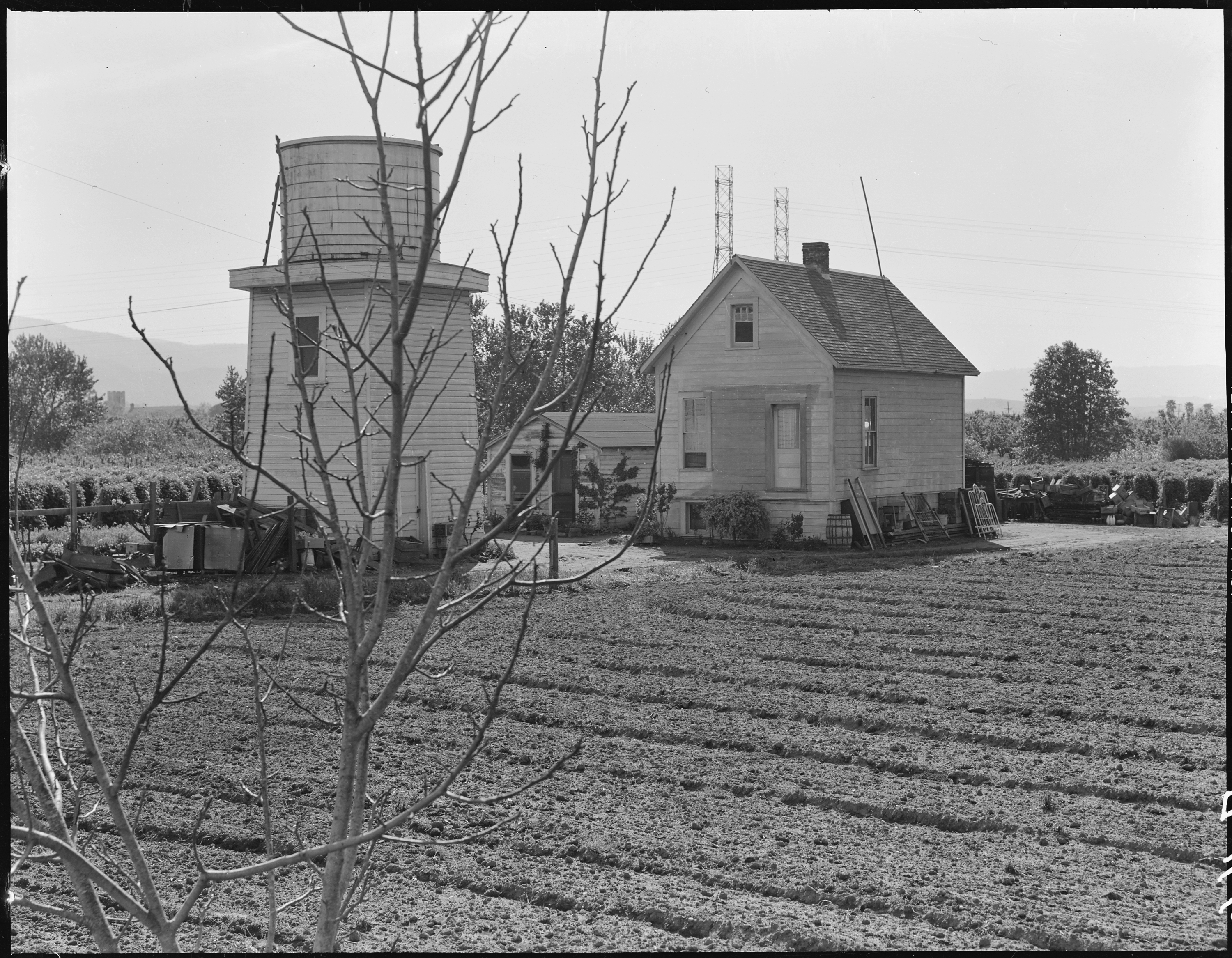
A loganberry farm in California in 1942

The 1896 book Santa Cruz County describes the loganberry thusly:

The Loganberry originated with Judge J. H. Logan, of Santa Cruz, Cal., from whom it derives its name. Several years ago, growing in his garden, were plants of the 'Aughinbaugh' blackberry and 'Red Antwerp' raspberry. The plants, being near each other, had intermixed or grown together. The judge, having noticed that they bloomed and ripened their fruit together, conceived the idea of planting the seeds, from which planting resulted the production of the loganberry.

He is entitled to all credit for the origination of this noble fruit, which will be a perpetual monument, placing his name beside those of Longworth, Hovey, Wilson, and other originators of new varieties of fruit. He has even done more than they. He has produced a fruit or berry entirely unlike any in previous existence, a hybrid or mixture of two fruits, partaking of the characteristics of both of its parents. The 'Aughinbaugh' blackberry, from the seed of which the Logan is supposed to have originated, has pistillate or imperfect flowers, which must have been fertilized by the pollen of the raspberry, producing this most singular and valuable fruit.

The vines or canes of the loganberry grow entirely unlike either the blackberry or raspberry. They trail or grow upon the ground more like the dewberry. They are exceedingly strong growers, each shoot or branch reaching a growth of eight to ten feet in one season without irrigation, the aggregate growth of all the shoots on one plant amounting to from forty to fifty feet.

The canes or vines are very large—without the thorns of the blackberry bushes—but have very fine soft spines, much like those of raspberry bushes. The leaves are of a deep green color, coarse and thick, and also like those of the raspberry. The fruit is as large as the largest size blackberry, is of the same shape, with globules similar to that fruit, and the color, when fully ripe, is a 'dark bright red'. It has the combined flavor of both berries, pleasant, mild, vinous, delightful to the taste and peculiar to this fruit alone.

It is excellent for the table, eaten raw or cooked, and for jelly or jam is without an equal. The seeds are very small, soft and not abundant, being greatly different from both its parents in this respect. The vines are enormous bearers, and the fruit is very firm and carries well.

The fruit begins to ripen very early—the bulk being ripe and gone before either blackberries or raspberries become plentiful. In filling in a place just ahead of these fruits the market value of the Loganberry is greatly enhanced. In ordinary seasons the fruit begins to ripen from the middle to the last of May. When extensively planted and generally known, this berry is destined to take front rank owing to its earliness, large size, beautiful appearance, superior quality, and delightful flavor, together with its firmness and good carrying or shipping quality.

Mr. James Waters, of this valley, has sole right with this vine.

Due to its high vitamin C content, the loganberry was used by the British navy at the beginning of the 20th century as a source of vitamin C to prevent sailors from getting scurvy, in much the same way as the British did with limes during the late 18th century. During this period at the beginning of the 20th century, the largest proportion of loganberries grown for the British navy (roughly a third) was grown on a single farm in Leigh Sinton, near Malvern in Worcestershire, England, run by the Norbury family.
