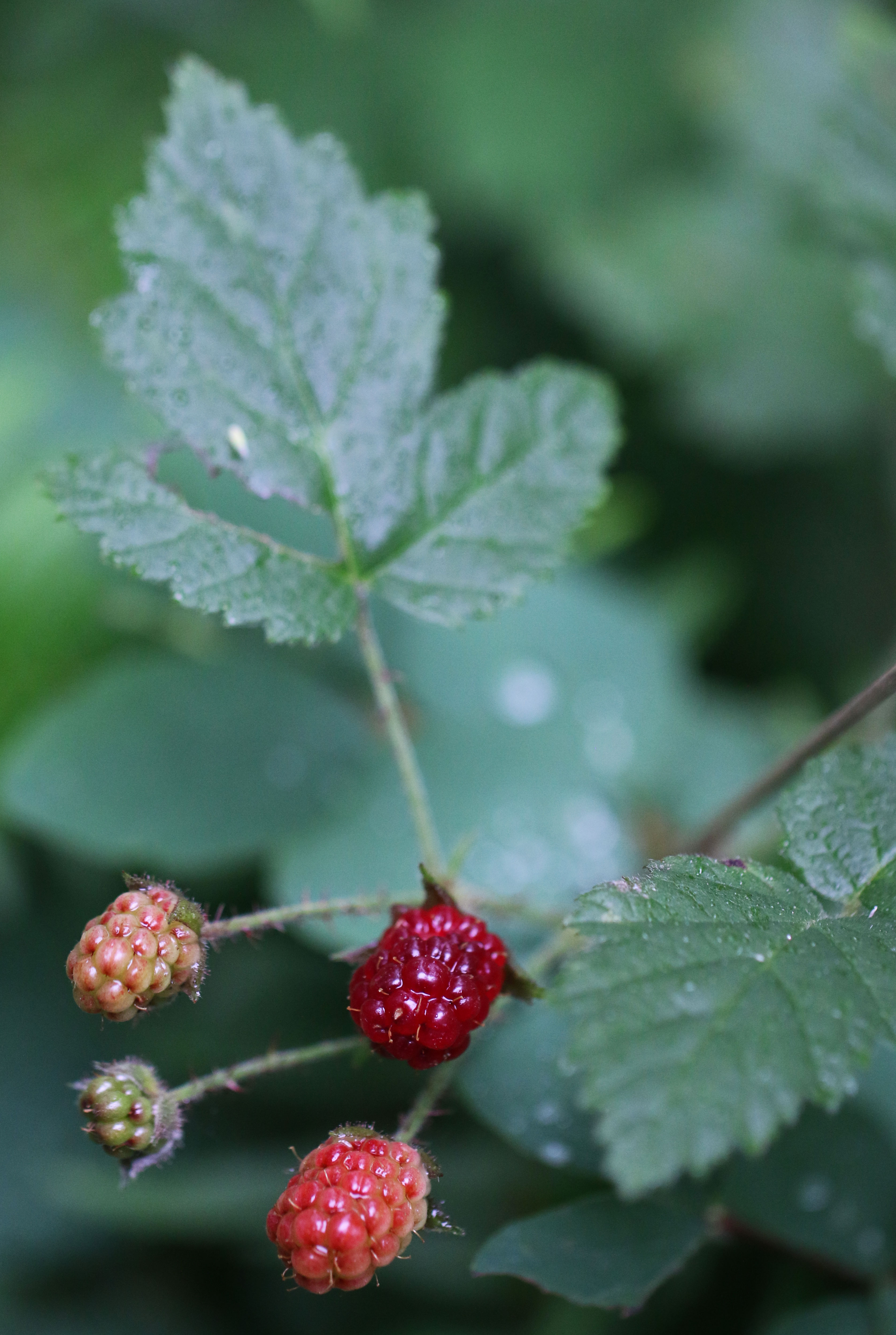
- Maturing berries in the U.S.

Scientific classification
- Kingdom: Plantae
- Clade: Embryophytes
- Clade: Tracheophytes
- Clade: Angiosperms
- Clade: Eudicots
- Clade: Rosids
- Order: Rosales
- Family: Rosaceae
- Genus: Rubus
- Subgenus: Rubus subg. Rubus
- Species: R. ursinus

Binomial name
- Rubus ursinus Cham. & Schldl. 1827 not Torr. & Gray 1840 nor (Weeber ex Sudre & Sabr.) Podp. & Domin 1928

Synonyms
- Rubus macropetalus Douglas ex Hook.; Rubus vitifolius Cham. & Schltdl.; Parmena menziesii (Hook.) Greene; Rubus menziesii Hook.; Rubus ursinus var. glabratus C.Presl; Rubus ursinus var. menziesii (Hook.) Focke; Rubus vitifolius subsp. ursinus (Cham. & Schltdl.) Abrams; Rubus sirbenus L.H.Bailey

= Rubus ursinus =

Berry and plant

Rubus ursinus is a North American species of blackberry or dewberry, known by the common names California blackberry, California dewberry, Douglas berry, Pacific blackberry, Pacific dewberry and trailing blackberry.

== Description ==
Rubus ursinus is a wide, mounding shrub or vine, growing to 0.6–1.5 metres (2–5 feet) tall and more than 1.8 m (6 ft) wide. The prickly branches can take root if they touch soil, thus enabling the plant to spread vegetatively and form larger clonal colonies.

The deciduous leaves usually have 3 leaflets but sometimes 5 or only 1. The plant is dioecious, with male and female being separate plants, also unusual for the genus. As with other Rubus species, the canes are typically vegetative the first year and reproductive in the second.

The fragrant flowers are white, with narrower petals than most related species. The sweet, very aromatic fruits are dark purple, dark red, or black and up to 2 centimetres (3/4 inch) long.

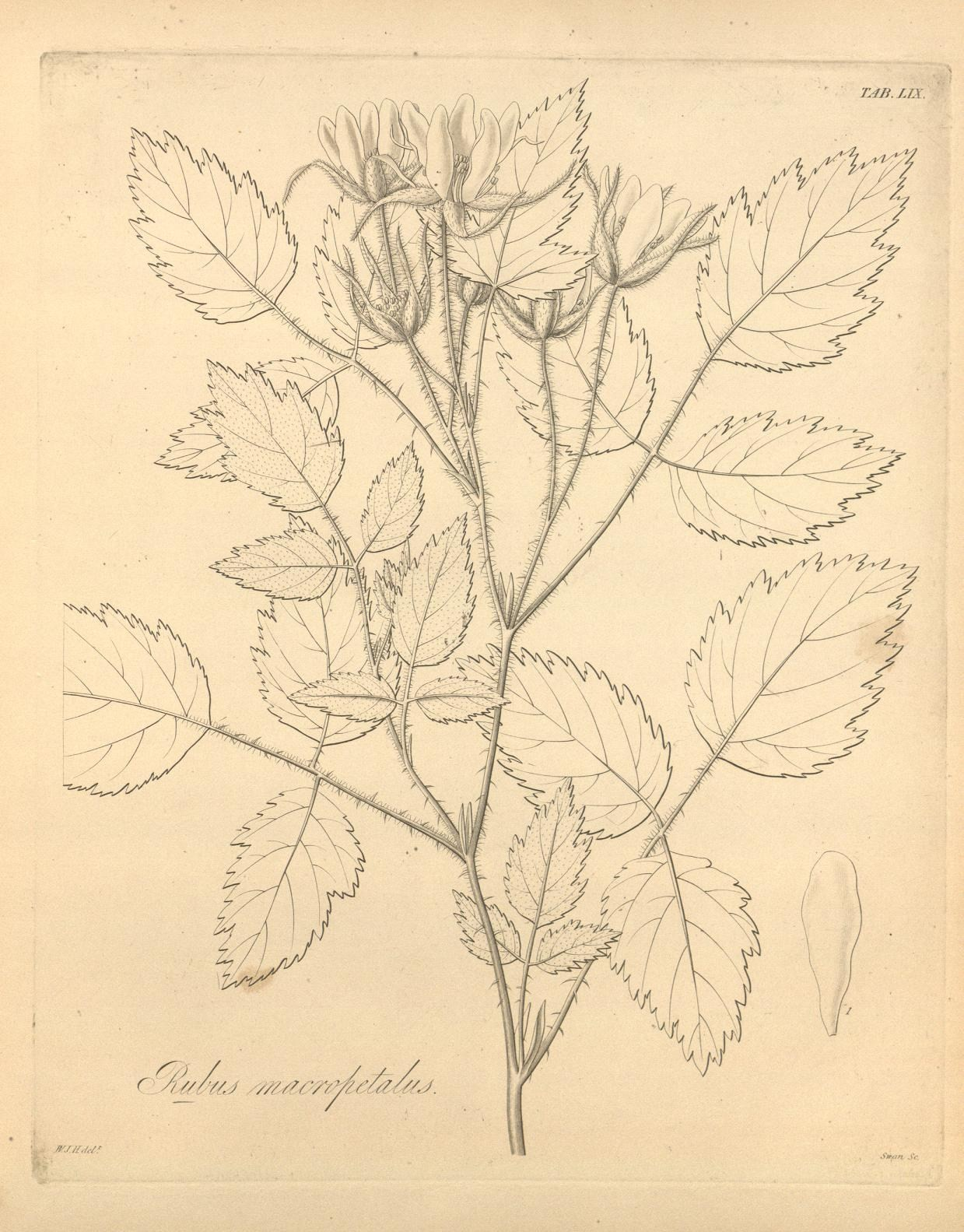
Illustration of leaves

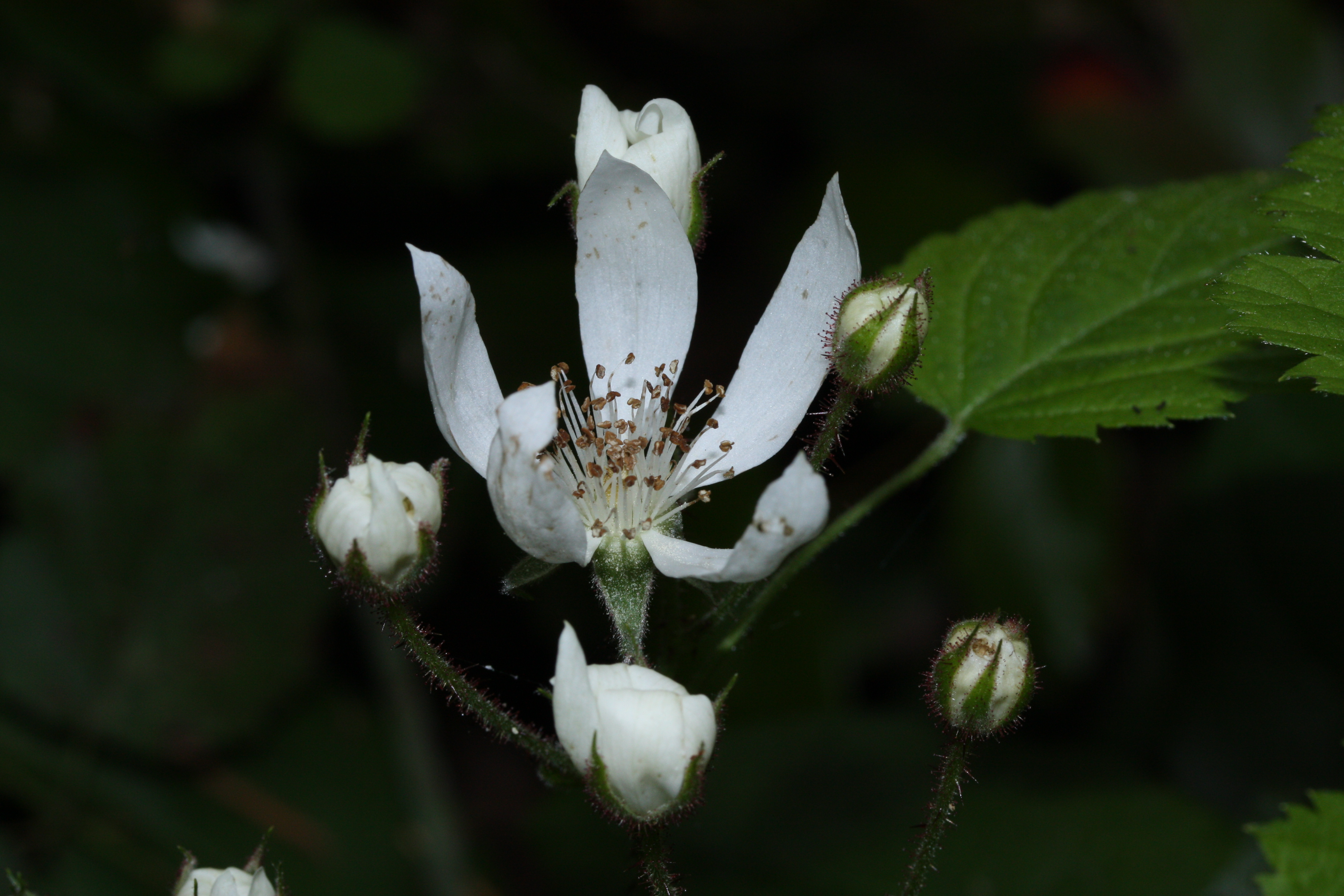
Flower and buds

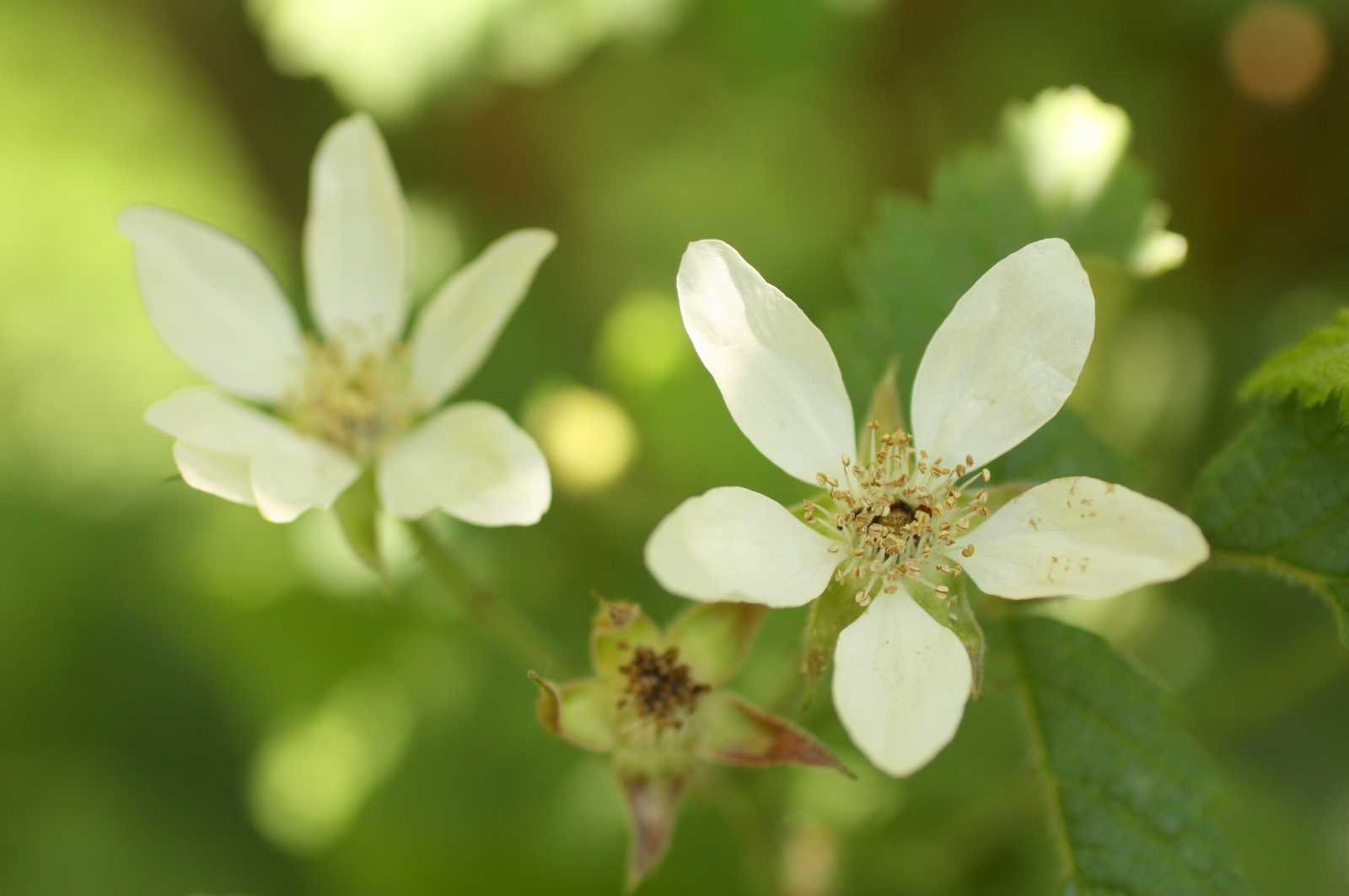
Flowers

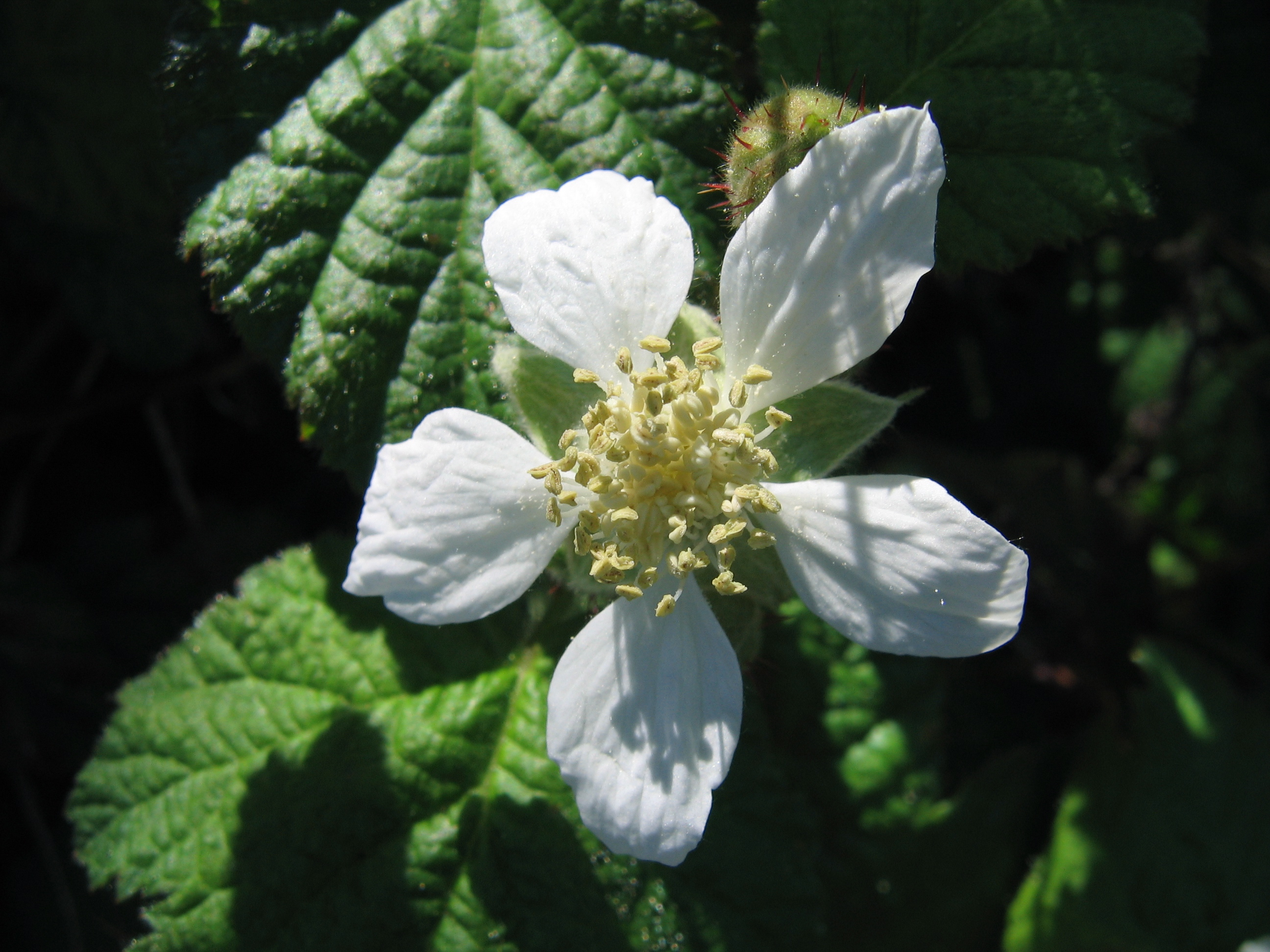
Close-up of flower

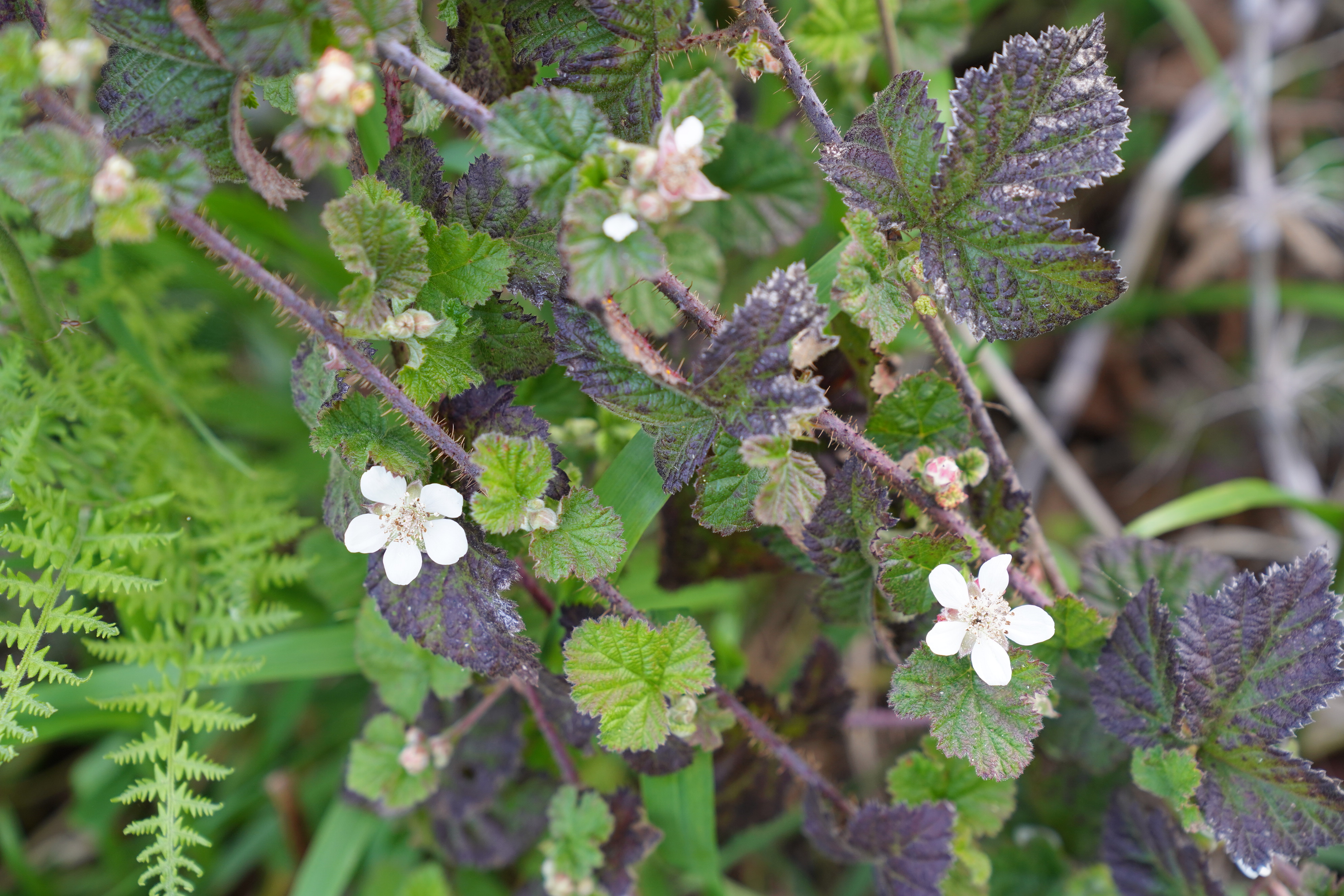
Prickly stems and older leaves

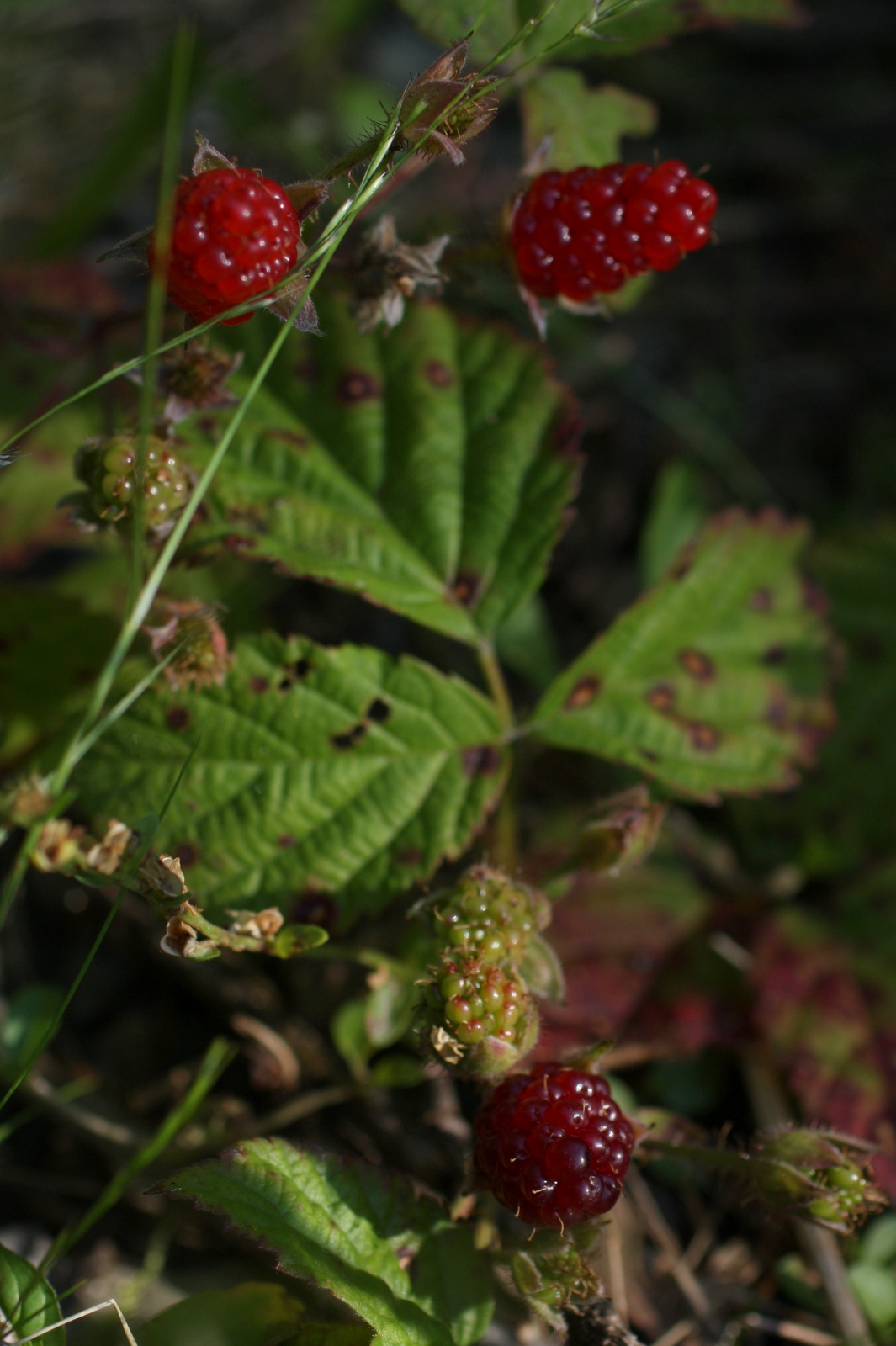
Berries

== Taxonomy ==
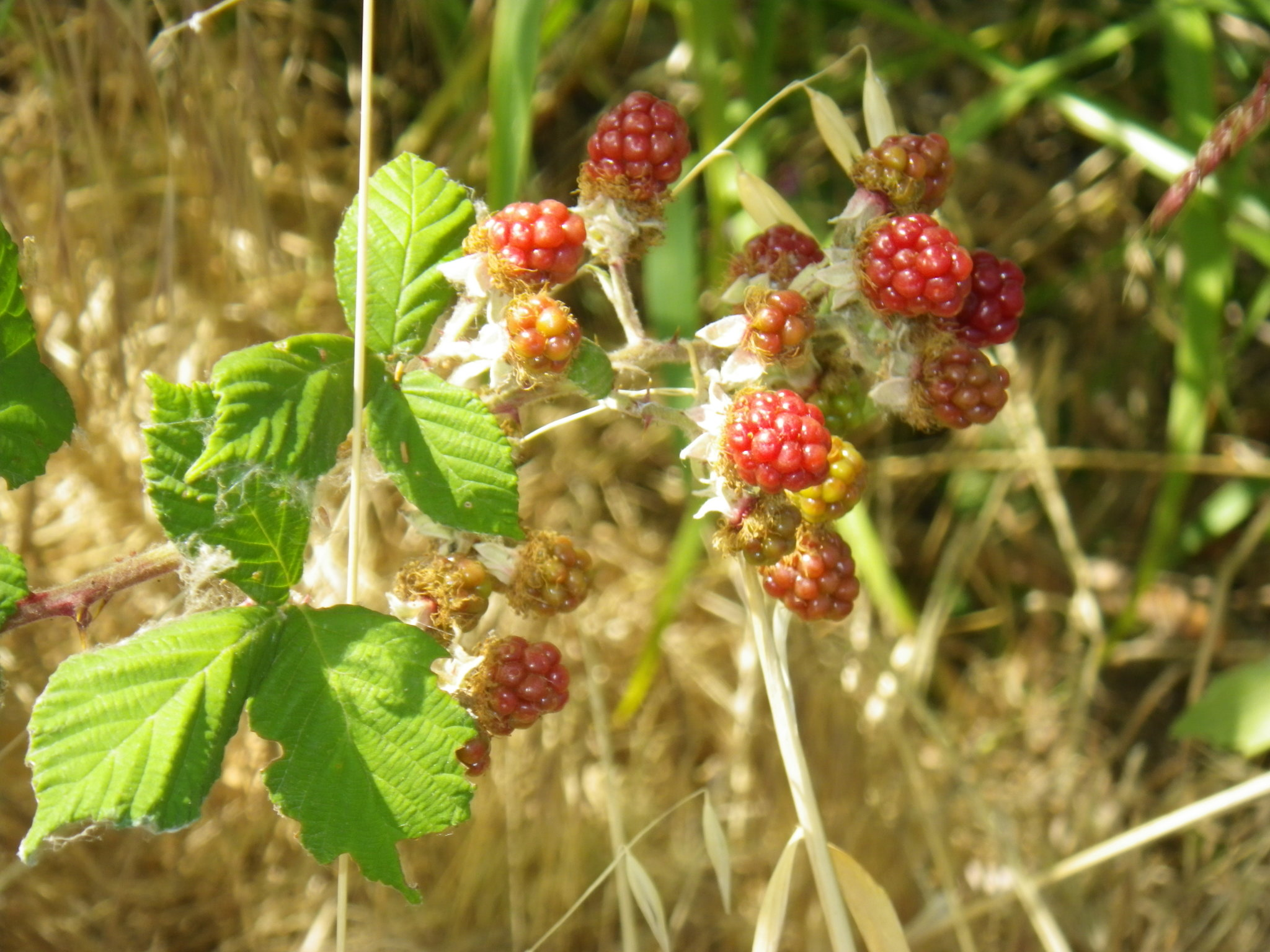
Berries of subsp. macropetalus

=== Subspecies and varieties ===
Current or recent subspecies and varieties include:

- Rubus ursinus subsp. macropetalus — all of distribution range
- Rubus ursinus subsp. ursinus — California and Oregon
- Rubus ursinus var. sirbenus — endemic to California
- Rubus ursinus var. ursinus — California and Oregon

==== Cultivars ====
A cultivar of this species named the 'Aughinbaugh' blackberry was a parent of the loganberry. R. ursinus is also a second-generation parent of the boysenberry and the marionberry, or 'Marion' blackberry.

'Wild Treasure' has the fruit size and flavor of the wild species, but without prickles, and the berries are machine harvestable. It was released by the U.S. Department of Agriculture's Agricultural Research Service in 2010, and is a hybrid between a selection of R. ursinus and 'Waldo' (another cultivar that is a second-generation descendant of the marionberry that has no prickles).

=== Etymology ===
The name is from rubus for "bramble" and ursinus for "bear".

== Distribution ==
The plant is native to western North America, found mainly in British Columbia (Canada); California, Idaho, Montana, Oregon, and Washington (Western U.S.); and Baja California state (Mexico).

== Ecology ==
Diverse wildlife eat the berries, including songbirds, deer, bear, and other large and small mammals. It is of notable pollinator and nesting material value for native bee and bumblebee species. This blackberry species is a larval food source for Papilio rutulus (the western tiger swallowtail butterfly), Nymphalis antiopa (the mourning cloak butterfly), Strymon melinus (the gray hairstreak butterfly), and Celastrina ladon (the spring azure butterfly).

== Uses and cultivation ==
Native Americans such as the Kumeyaay, Maidu, Pomo, Interior Salish, and Coast Salish peoples used R. ursinus as a fresh and dried fruit source and as a traditional medicinal plant. The Concow tribe calls this plant Gol-lē' in the Konkow language.

The plant is cultivated for its edible fruit and also ornamental plant qualities. It is planted in home, native plant, and wildlife gardens, and in natural landscaping projects. It can be espaliered or trained on fences and trellising. When mature/established, the plant is effective in stabilizing creek banks and edges of bioswales.

To set large fruit, the plant needs consistent amounts of moisture. Otherwise it is moderately drought tolerant when established. Seed size seems to be related to fruit "cell" size, and the smallest fully formed berries (about 1 cm or 3/8 in), sometimes called "little wild blackberries", are most highly prized.

=== Rubus ursinus crosses ===
Red Antwerp; Raspberry
Rubus ursinus Pacific Blackberry	Loganberry
Santiam

Rubus ursinus Pacific Blackberry cultivar: Aughinbaugh
Crandall; Eastern Blackberry	Cuthbert; Red Raspberry
Black Logan	Phenomenal
