= James Harvey Logan =

Judge and amateur botanist in Santa Cruz, California (1841–1928)

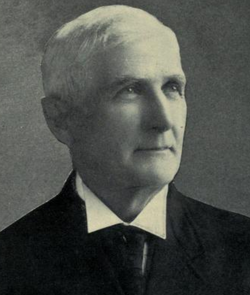
- Born: December 8, 1841; Rockville, Indiana, U.S.
- Died: July 16, 1928 (aged 86); Oakland, California, U.S.
- Burial place: Cypress Lawn Memorial Park, Colma, California, U.S.
- Other name: J. H. Logan
- Occupations: Lawyer, judge, amateur botanist
- Spouse: Mary Elizabeth Couson (m. 1910–)
- Children: 1

James Harvey Logan (December 8, 1841 – July 16, 1928) was an American judge, lawyer, and an amateur botanist in Santa Cruz, California. He is credited with the 1881 creation of the loganberry, a cross between the raspberry and the blackberry.

He was District Attorney in the 1870s, and a Superior Court Judge during the 1880s and 1890s.

== Biography ==
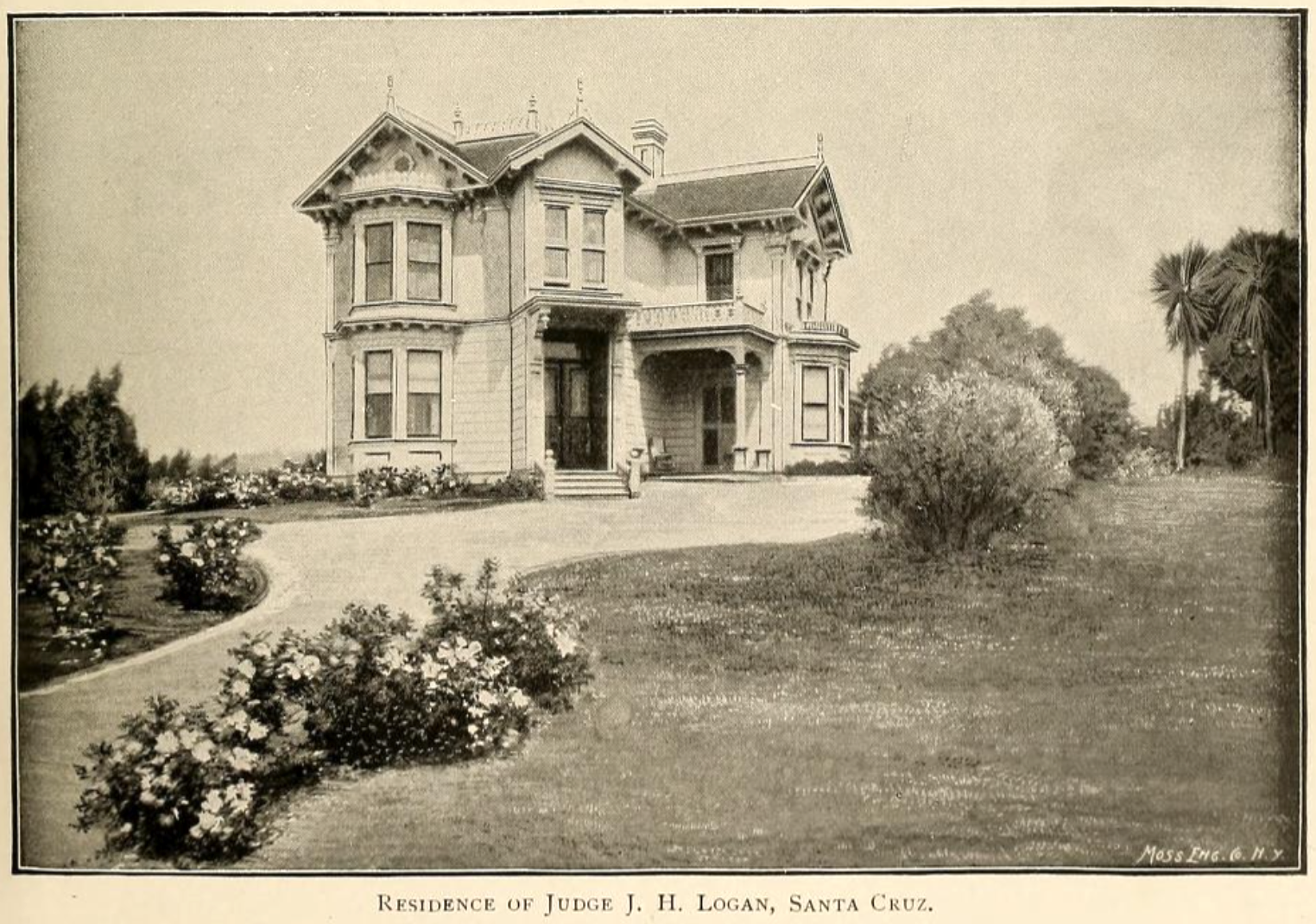
Residence of Judge J. H. Logan, Santa Cruz, California

He was born on December 8, 1841, in Rockville, Indiana. After moving to Santa Cruz, Logan was elected District Attorney on 1 September 1875. He had been endorsed by both the Democrats and the Independent ticket. He had previously served as District Attorney in 1872 and 1873. Logan was subsequently elected to the Superior Court and served several terms as judge, from 1880 to 1884 and from 1893 to 1897.

Logan built the Brookdale Lodge on the site of the Grover Lumber Mill in the 1890s, purchased the Brookdale Town Site in 1902, put in a wagon road and had a cottage built in 1905, and had lots laid out in 1907. His wife, Catherine, died at Brookdale on 13 July 1909. He sold the land to John DuBois for a subdivision by 1911.

Logan married Mary E. Couson on 1 August 1910; they had a daughter—Gladys C. Logan—on 14 August 1911. Although Logan moved to Oakland, California in 1913, he continued business activity in the Santa Cruz area, building a new store in 1915.

He died on July 16, 1928, in Oakland, California.
