= Youngberry =

Hybrid cultivar of fruit and plant

Rubus caesius 'Youngberry'
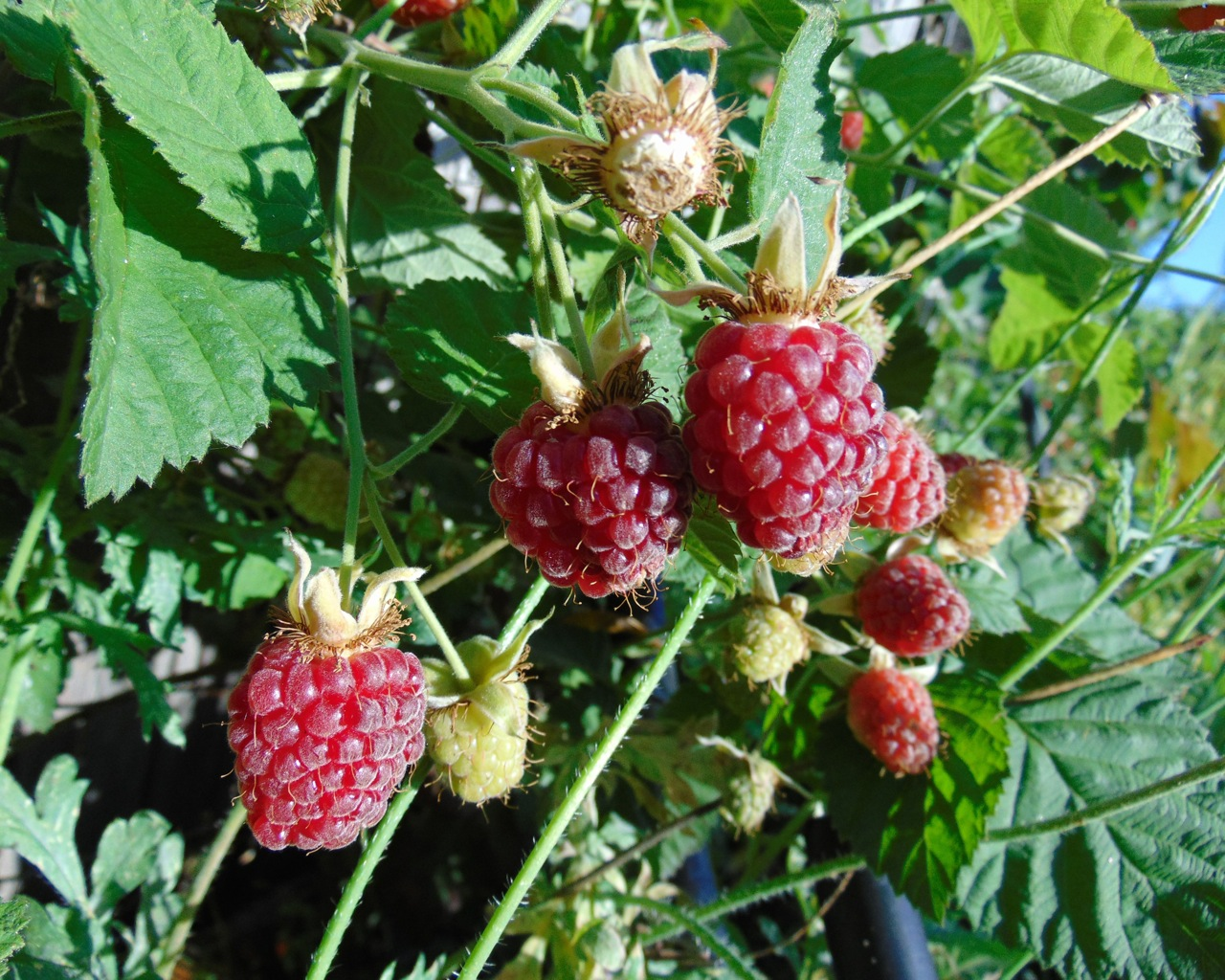
- Species: Rubus caesius
- Cultivar: 'Youngberry'
- Breeder: Byrnes M. Young, a businessman in Morgan City, Louisiana

The youngberry is a complex hybrid between three different berry species from the genus Rubus of the rose family: raspberry, blackberry, and dewberry. The berries of the plant are eaten fresh or used to make juice, jam, and in recipes.

The youngberry was created in the early 20th century by B.M. Young in Louisiana by crossing the 'Phenomenal' blackberry–raspberry hybrid with the 'Mayes' dewberry. It is similar to the loganberry, "nectarberry", and boysenberry in shape, color, and flavor. Youngberries can be grown in fertile clay soils. They are cultivated on small farms and home gardens in temperate climates, such as Louisiana, Texas, western United States, Australia, and New Zealand.
