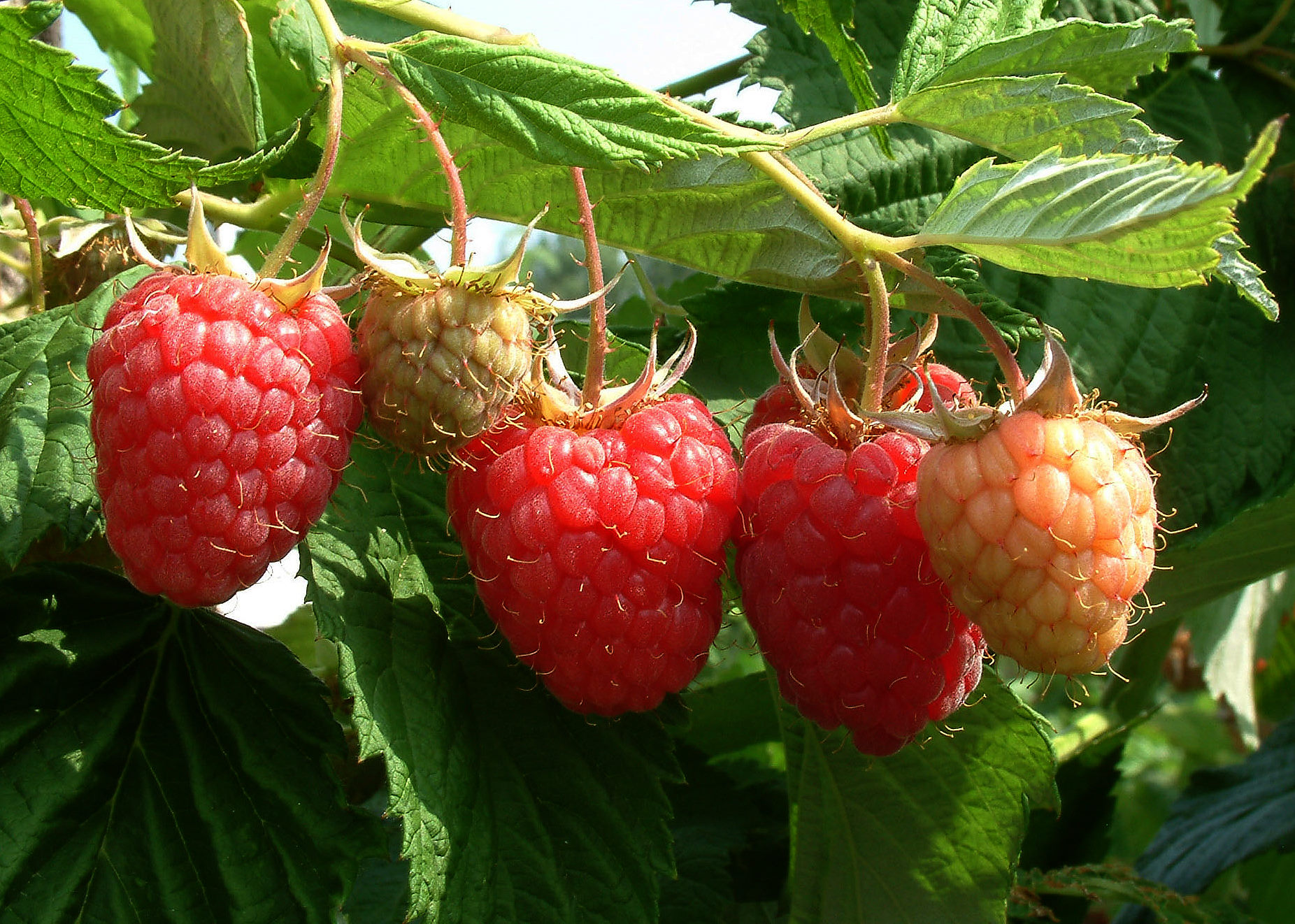

Scientific classification
- Kingdom: Plantae
- Clade: Tracheophytes
- Clade: Angiosperms
- Clade: Eudicots
- Clade: Rosids
- Order: Rosales
- Family: Rosaceae
- Genus: Rubus
- Subgenus: Rubus subg. Idaeobatus
- Species: R. idaeus

Binomial name
- Rubus idaeus L. 1753 not Blanco 1837 nor Vell. 1829 nor Pursh 1814 nor Thunb. 1784

Synonyms
- Synonymy: Batidaea idea (L.) Nieuwl.; Batidaea vulgaris Nieuwl.; Batidea peramoena Greene; Rubus acanthocladus Borb; Rubus buschii (Rozanova) Grossh.; Rubus chrysocarpus Čelak. ex Gyer; Rubus euroasiaticus Sinkova; Rubus fragrans Salisb.; Rubus frambaesianus Lam.; Rubus glaber Mill. ex Simonk.; Rubus greeneanus L.H.Bailey; Rubus leesii Bab.; Rubus obtusifolius Willd.; Rubus sericeus Gilib.; Rubus vulgatus Rozanova; Rubus komarovii Nakai; Rubus melanolasius (Dieck ex Focke) Kom.; Rubus sachalinensis H.Lév.; Rubus sibiricus (Kom.) Sinkova; Rubus nipponicus (Focke) Koidz.; Batidea acalyphacea Greene; Batidea arizonica Greene; Rubus carolinianus Rydb.; Rubus melanolasius Dieck; Rubus neglectus Peck; Rubus strigosus Michx.; Batidea viburnifolia Greene

= Rubus idaeus =

Red raspberry

Rubus idaeus (raspberry, also called red raspberry or occasionally European red raspberry to distinguish it from other raspberry species) is a red-fruited species of Rubus native to Eurasia and commonly cultivated in other temperate regions.

== Description ==
Plants of Rubus idaeus are generally perennials, which bear biennial stems ("canes") from a perennial root system. In its first year, a new, unbranched stem ("primocane") grows vigorously to its full height of 1.5–2.5 metres (5–8 feet), bearing large pinnately compound leaves with five or seven leaflets, but usually no flowers. In its second year (as a "floricane"), a stem does not grow taller, but produces several side shoots, which bear smaller leaves with three or five leaflets.

The flowers are produced in late spring on short racemes on the tips of these side shoots, each flower about 1 centimetre (3/8 inch) in diameter with five white petals. The fruit is red, edible, and sweet but tart-flavoured, produced in summer or early autumn; it is technically not a berry, but an aggregate fruit of numerous drupelets around a central core. In raspberries (various species of Rubus subgenus Idaeobatus), the drupelets separate from the core when picked, leaving a hollow fruit, whereas in blackberries and most other species of Rubus, the drupelets stay attached to the core.

Its fruit persists for an average of 12 days, and bears an average of 35.2 seeds per fruit. Wild fruits average 76.3% water, and their dry weight includes 39.6% carbohydrates and 2.2% lipids.

=== Chemistry ===
Vitamin C and phenolics are present in red raspberries. Most notably, the anthocyanins cyanidin-3-sophoroside, cyanidin-3-(2(G)-glucosylrutinoside) and cyanidin-3-glucoside, the two ellagitannins sanguiin H-6 and lambertianin C are present together with trace levels of flavonols, ellagic acid and hydroxycinnamate.

Polyphenolic compounds from raspberry seeds have antioxidant effects in vitro, but have no proven antioxidant effect in humans. Raspberry ketones are derived from various fruits and plants, not raspberries, and are marketed as having weight loss benefits. There is no clinical evidence for this effect in humans.

=== Similar species ===
A closely related plant in North America, sometimes regarded as the variety Rubus idaeus var. strigosus, is more commonly treated as a distinct species, Rubus strigosus (American red raspberry), as is done here. Red-fruited cultivated raspberries, even in North America, are generally Rubus idaeus or horticultural derivatives of hybrids of R. idaeus and R. strigosus; these plants are all addressed in the present article.

== Etymology ==
The species name, idaeus, refers to its occurrence on Mount Ida near Troy in what is now northwest Turkey, where the ancient Greeks were most familiar with it.

== Distribution and habitat ==
The species is native to Europe and northern Asia and commonly cultivated in other temperate regions.

As a wild plant, R. idaeus typically grows in forests, forming open stands under a tree canopy, and denser stands in clearings. In the south of its range (southern Europe and central Asia), it occurs only at high altitudes in mountains.

== Uses ==
R. idaeus is grown primarily for its fruits, but occasionally for its leaves, roots, or other parts.

=== Fruits ===
The fruit of R. idaeus is an important food crop, though most modern commercial raspberry cultivars derive from hybrids between R. idaeus and R. strigosus. The fruits of wild plants have a sweet taste and are very aromatic.

=== Leaves and other parts ===
Young roots of R. idaeus prevented kidney stone formation in a mouse model of hyperoxaluria. Tiliroside from raspberry is a potent tyrosinase inhibitor and might be used as a skin-whitening agent and pigmentation medicine.

== Gallery ==
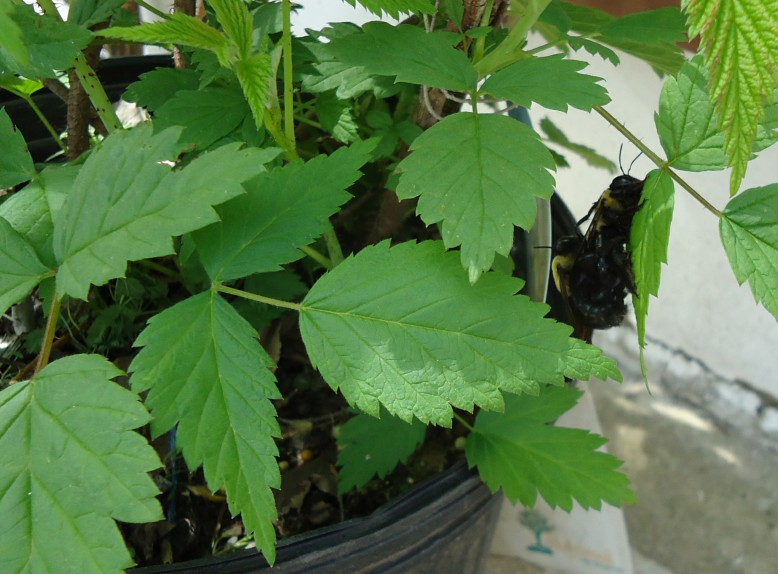
A red raspberry plant in a nursery in Cranford, New Jersey

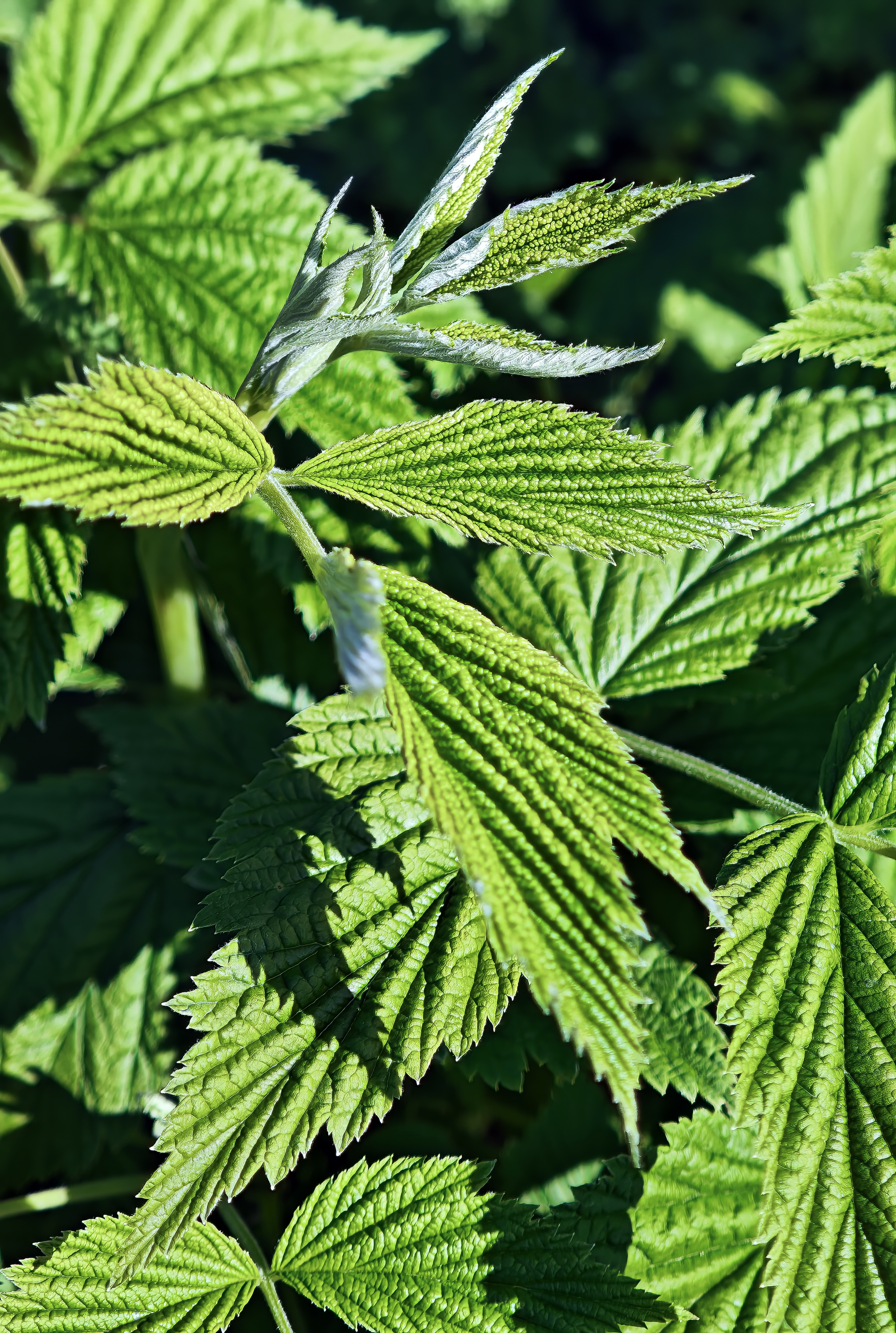
Foliage

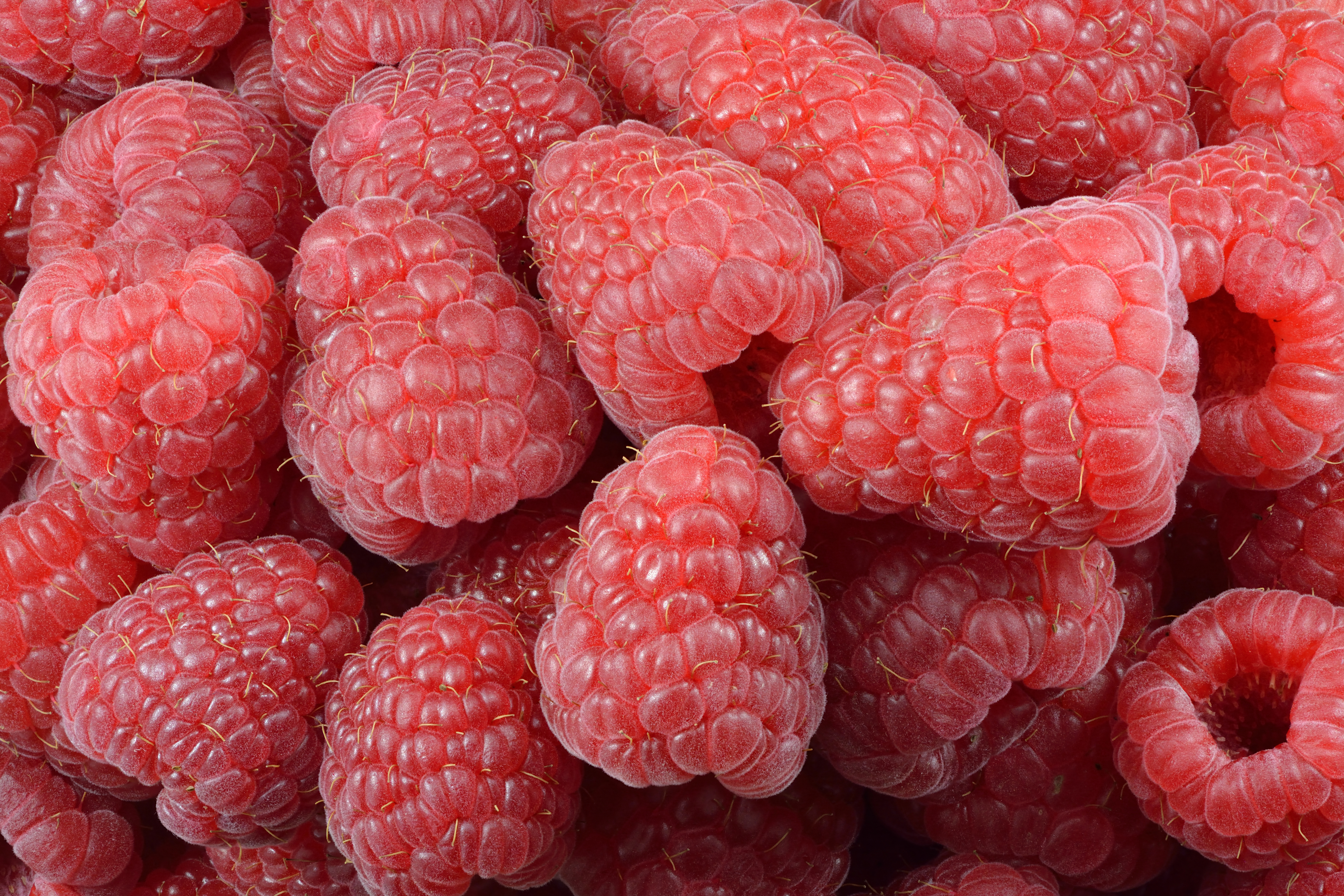
Raspberries

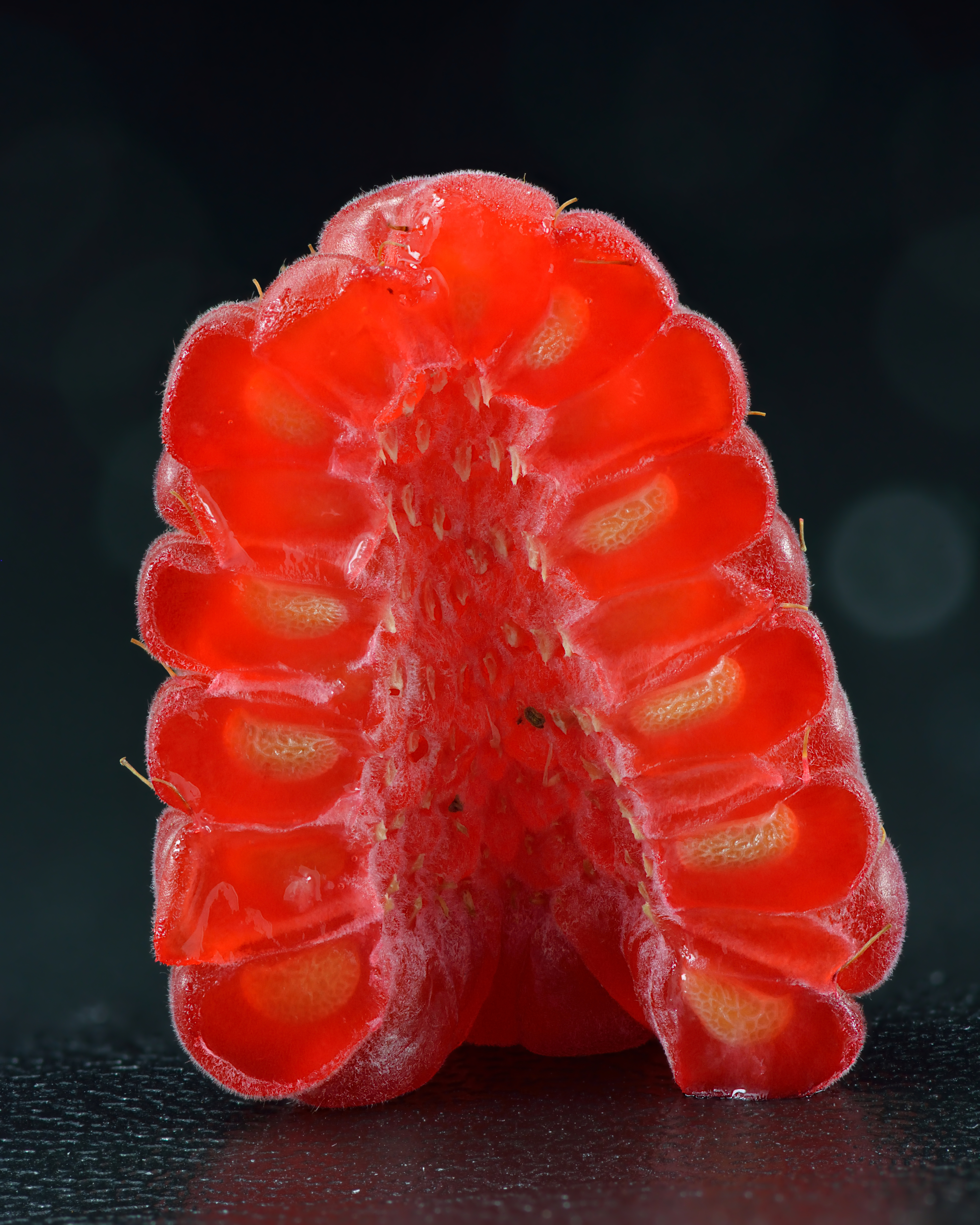
Halved raspberry

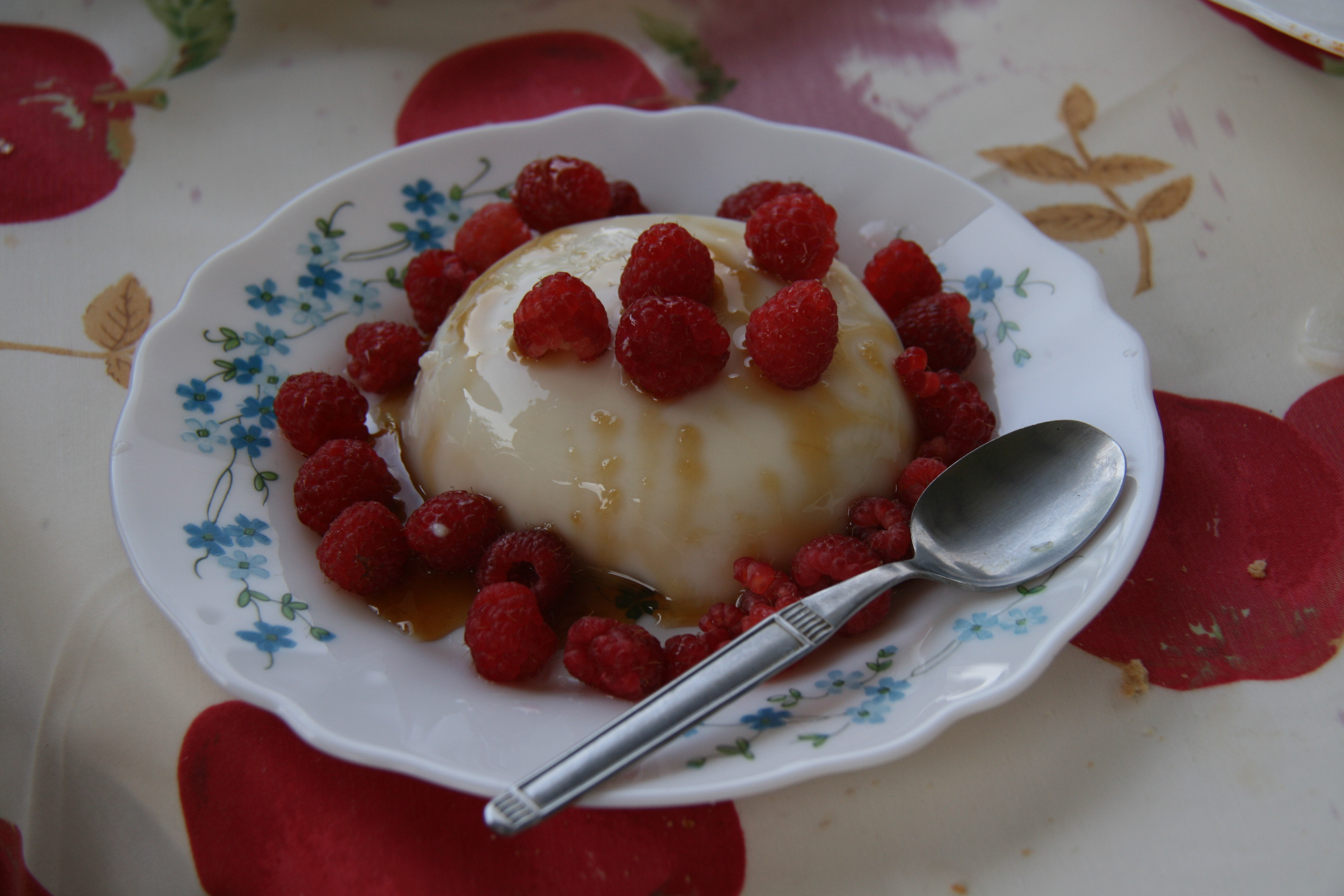
Raspberry dessert with cream cheese and honey

== See also ==
- Chambord (liqueur) – raspberry-based liqueur
- List of culinary fruits

== Bibliography ==
- Ehrlén, Johan; Eriksson, Ove (1991). "Phenological variation in fruit characteristics in vertebrate-dispersed plants". Oecologia. 86 (4): 463–470. Bibcode:1991Oecol..86..463E. doi:10.1007/BF00318311. ISSN 0029-8549. PMID 28313326.
