= George M. Darrow =

American botanist (1889–1983)

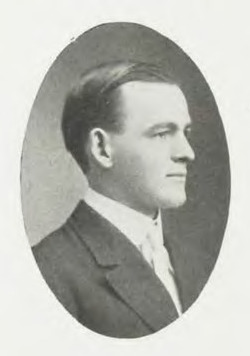
- George McMillan Darrow in 1910
- Born: 2 February 1889; Springfield
- Died: June 1983 (aged 93–94); Maryland
- Alma mater: Cornell University; Middlebury College; Johns Hopkins University
- Occupation: Pomologist
- Employer: United States Department of Agriculture

George McMillan Darrow (1889–1983) was an American horticulturist and the foremost authority on strawberries. He worked for the United States Department of Agriculture (USDA-ARS) for forty-six years as the pomologist in charge of research on deciduous fruit production, and authored a multitude of papers on planting and cultivating small fruits.

== Life and career ==
Darrow was born in Springfield, Vermont on February 2, 1889. He graduated from nearby Chester High School in 1906, and in 1910 from Middlebury College. He went on to Cornell University, obtaining an MA in horticulture in 1911. During 1912-1917 Darrow partnered with future U.S. Senator George Aiken in "Darrow and Aiken," a fruit growing enterprise in Putney, Vermont. By 1917, however, he was committed to full-time work with the U.S. Department of Agriculture. In 1927 he obtained a Ph.D. in plant physiology from Johns Hopkins University. A prolific author, Darrow wrote over 230 research or review articles, bulletins, and book chapters; a majority were USDA publications and reports. The bulk of his career was spent in Maryland (Glenn Dale and later Beltsville). However, in the late 1920s and early 1930s he initiated small fruit breeding programs in Oregon for the USDA. Darrow was constantly looking for ways to improve strawberries, and was responsible for the development of twenty-eight strawberry cultivars, twelve of which remain significant. Another accomplishment that made a profound impression on small fruit scientists was Darrow's establishment of a foundation of genetic material that would figure prominently in breeding new strawberry varieties. He realized that improvement in small fruits had to occur by developing new varieties. In order to do this, he thought that scientists should possess an extensive knowledge of the make-up of a strawberry plant. Darrow is predominantly known for strawberry breeding and research, but he worked with all small fruits, including blackberries, raspberries, and blueberries. His personal hobby and passion was breeding daylilies.

In the late 1920s, Darrow began tracking down reports of a large, reddish-purple berry that had been grown on the northern California farm of a man named Rudolph Boysen. He enlisted the help of Walter Knott, a Southern California farmer who was known as a berry expert. Darrow and Knott learned that Boysen had abandoned his growing experiments several years earlier and sold his farm. Undaunted, Darrow and Knott headed out to Boysen's old farm, on which they found several frail vines surviving in a field choked with weeds. They transplanted the vines to Knott's farm in Buena Park, California, where he nurtured them back to fruit-bearing health, making Knott the first to commercially cultivate "boysenberries".

In 1928, he gave a public lecture on eugenics and religion.

In 1948 Darrow received the Wilder Medal of the American Pomological Society for outstanding work on small fruits. In 1949 he was elected President of the American Society for Horticultural Science. In 1952 he served as U.S. Delegate for the 13th International Horticultural Congress in London, U.K. In 1954 Darrow received the USDA Distinguished Service Award, "For leadership and research contributions to the breeding and improvement of small fruits, thereby providing more dependable, productive, and better quality varieties of value to both the producer and consumer."

In 1956-1957 Darrow surveyed the native strawberries of Chile and collected germplasm in Andean South America. After retiring in 1957 Darrow wrote his classic book, The Strawberry: History, Breeding and Physiology, published in 1966. It is available as a PDF via the National Agricultural Library. He died in 1983 in Maryland. In 1993 he became the eighth inductee into the American Society for Horticultural Science Hall of Fame for extraordinary contributions to horticulture.
