= Ralph Randles Stewart =

American botanist (1890–1993)

- Born: April 15, 1890; Hebron, New York, U.S.
- Died: November 6, 1993 (aged 103); Duarte, California, U.S.
- Education: Columbia University, United States; University of Punjab, Pakistan; Alma College, Michigan, United States
- Known for: His work on the Botany and educational efforts in the Universities and college of Pakistan and United States.
- Awards: Kaiser-e-Hind (1938); Sitara-e-Imtiaz (1961)
- Scientific career
- Fields: Botany
- Workplaces: Gordon College; University of Michigan; Columbia University, New York

Ralph Randles Stewart (April 15, 1890 – November 6, 1993) usually referred to as R. R. Stewart, was an American botanist and principal of Gordon College in Pakistan.

== Education ==
Stewart was born in Hebron, New York. He obtained his B.A. and Ph.D. degrees from Columbia University, New York. He later received a D.Sc. Honorary (1953) from the University of the Punjab, Lahore and an LLD Honorary (1963) from Alma College, Michigan, USA.

== Career ==
Upon receiving his college degree from Columbia University in 1911, Stewart accepted a three-year position with the United Presbyterian Church teaching botany and zoology at Gordon College (Pakistan), in Rawalpindi (then in India). After spending from September, 1911 until July, 1914, in that position, he returned to the United States and in the fall of 1914 began graduate studies in botany at Columbia. In 1916 he completed his Ph.D. and married fellow-Columbia graduate student Isabelle Caroline Darrow, sister of botanist George M. Darrow. Returning to Gordon College, Stewart was Professor of Botany (1917–1960) and Principal (1934–1954).

After retiring from Gordon College in 1960, Stewart moved back to the United States. He took a position as Research Associate (1960–1981) at the University of Michigan Herbarium with over 30,000 plant specimens that he had collected in India, Kashmir, Iran, etc.

== Awards ==
In recognition of his services to educational and botanical work, Stewart was awarded the Kaisar-i-Hind Medal in 1938, and the Sitara-e-Imtiaz (Star of Distinction) in 1961. He was recognized as a Member of the American Association for Advancement of Sciences in 1984, and as a foreign member Pakistan Academy of Sciences in 1983.

In 1972, botanist Eugene Nasir published Stewartiella is a genus of flowering plants from Afghanistan and Pakistan, belonging to the family Apiaceae and was named in Ralph Randles Stewart's honor.

== Activities ==
At that time the flora of India and Western Himalayas was not well known. Stewart embarked on plant collection trips, often on his bicycle, as far as Kashmir and into Western Tibet. He continued to collect plants every summer (1912–1959) without any financial support. In 1960, when Stewart retired at the age of 70, he gave his collection of over 50,000 plant specimens, now called the Stewart Collection, to Professor E. Nasir at Gordon College (Rawalpindi). The Stewart Collection has been deposited in the National Herbarium of the government of Pakistan at Islamabad, leaving a very rich heritage for the students of plant sciences.

Stewart was the father of systematic botany in Pakistan, having spent more than 50 years in the Indian subcontinent. He wrote comprehensive reports on the flora of N. W. Himalayas, Western Tibet, Kashmir, Kurram Valley, flora of Balochistan and grasses of West Pakistan. Apart from collecting flowering plants, Stewart made a scientific contribution in the collection of mosses, plant disease specimens like rusts, smuts and fleshy fungi which have since been published in Mycologia by Dr. Arthur and Dr. Cummins of Purdue University. One of his most important contributions "An Annotated Catalogue of Vascular Plants of Pakistan and Kashmir (1972)" serves as the basis of writing the Flora of Pakistan edited by E. Nasir and S.I. Ali (1970–1988), S. I. Ali and Y. J. Nasir (1989–1991) and S. I. Ali and M. Qaiser (1992–).

Stewart returned to Pakistan in 1990 to visit Gordon College and make a presentation at the International Symposium on Plant life of South Asia. The symposium was organized at the Department of Botany, University of Karachi, to commemorate the centenary of Stewart. The participation of Stewart is indicative of his interest of plant sciences and his love for Pakistan.

In 1982, at the age of 91, Stewart wrote a sort of memoir, Flora of Pakistan: History and Exploration of Plants in Pakistan and Adjoining Areas, in which he wrote:

As a fresh graduate of Columbia University in New York City ... I began to lecture in Botany and Zoology in a tiny Presbyterian Mission college in Rawalpindi with only 86 students. I had a three-year appointment and not expecting to be in India again, I wondered what would be the most interesting way to spend the two summers I expected to have in the East, on a slender budget (my salary was $600 a year with a room in a dormitory). In 1911, with four young men (two Americans, a Bengali and a Scot) who wanted an adventurous summer vacation, we decided that a good way to utilize the summer of 1912 would be to hike in Kashmir and Western Tibet (Ladak). Two of us worked in Gordon College, Rawalpindi, at the beginning of the cart road to Kashmir constructed in 1890 with a good deal of cost and difficulty. It crossed the first Himalayan Range at Jhicca Gali near Murree (2100 m), descended to the Jhelum River at Kohala and then followed the river to Srinagar, a distance of 196 miles. We had nearly three months of vacation and we left Rawalpindi at the beginning of July on our push-bikes. It was still in the horse and buggy age, just before the Model-T Fords and the buses began to carry visitors to Kashmir. Our cook and baggage traveled in a one-horse, springless vehicle called an ekka. I was the only botanist in the party. The other were interested in taking pictures and seeing new country. We spent the summer in Kashmir and Ladak and I enjoyed the trip so much that I helped organize an even longer expedition for the summer of 1913. We again rode bicycles to the Kashmir Valley and again hiked to Leh, the capital of Ladak. Instead of returning to Kashmir we turned east from Leh, crossed the Rupshu plains and entered Lahul by the Baralacha Pass; left Lahul by the Rotang La, visited Kulu and then walked further east to Simla and returned home from there by train.

== Personal life ==
In September 1916, Stewart married Isabelle Caroline Darrow (1888-1953) at the bride's home in Middlebury, Vermont. Darrow, also born in Hebron, New York, graduated from Middlebury College in 1911, and then spent 1911-14 teaching science in a United Presbyterian Church position at Anatolia College in Merzifon. She was the sister of botanist George M. Darrow. The couple met studying for graduate degrees in science at Columbia in 1915, both wishing to return to teaching abroad. They had two daughters at Gordon College, Jean Macmillan Stewart Andrews (1919–1970), born in Sialkot, and Ellen Reid Stewart Daniels (1921–1998), born at Jhelum, followed by six grandchildren and six great-grandchildren. After the death of Stewart's first wife, Isabelle (Darrow) Stewart, he married Winifred Hladia Porter (1896–1984) in 1954. He died in 1993 in Duarte, California.

== See also ==
- Columbia University
- Gordon College
- National Herbarium Islamabad
