= Sacketts Brook Stone Arch Bridge =

- U.S. National Register of Historic Places
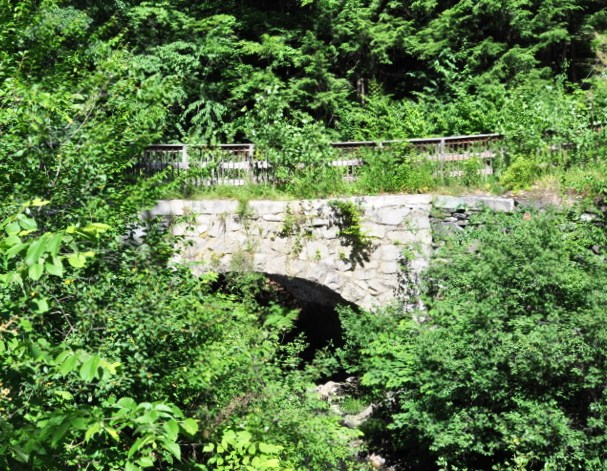

- Location within Vermont Location within the United States
- Location: Off the end of Mill St. and Hi-Lo Biddy Rd., Putney, Vermont
- Coordinates: 42°58′29″N 72°31′5″W
- Area: less than one acre
- Built: 1906
- Built by: Follett, James Otis
- NRHP reference No.: 76000151
- Added to NRHP: December 12, 1976

The Sacketts Brook Stone Arch Bridge, also known locally as the Hi-Lo Biddy Stone Arch Bridge, is a historic bridge just outside the village of Putney, Vermont. It is a stone arch bridge that formerly carried Mill Street (or Hi-Lo Biddy Road) across Sacketts Brook, about 0.25 miles (0.40 km) east of United States Route 5. It was built in 1906 by James Otis Follett, an area stonemason, and is one of a few surviving examples of his work. The bridge was listed on the National Register of Historic Places in 1976.

== Description and history ==
The Sacketts Brook Stone Arch Bridge spans Sacketts Brook in a wooded ravine a short way east of the center of Putney village. The road it formerly carried (now truncated at each end) is designated Mill Street on the west side and Hi-Lo Biddy Road on the east side of the brook. The bridge has a single span, supported by a segmented arch 29 feet (8.8 m) long. It rises about 12.5 feet (3.8 m) above the stream, and has a roadway width of 15.5 feet (4.7 m), sufficient for a single lane of modern traffic. The arch is formed out of mortared granite blocks, with a slightly projecting keystone at the top of the arch. The stones are laid in a mostly regular pattern, and the bridge spandrels are filled in with more irregularly-laid stone. Three layers of stone are laid on top of the arch, above which is the gravel roadbed. The bridge abutments and adjoining wing walls are of irregularly coursed rubblestone laid without mortar.

The bridge was built in 1906 by James Otis Follett, a mason from nearby Townshend. Follett is documented to have built more than 40 bridges and culverts, all at a time when stone bridges were falling out of fashion, supplanted by ironwork bridges. Of these works, this bridge was one of eleven documented to survive at the time of its listing on the National Register in 1976. The bridge was closed to vehicular traffic in 1996, and its abutments and wing walls were described as threatened by erosion in a 2000 report.

== See also ==
- National Register of Historic Places listings in Windham County, Vermont
- List of bridges on the National Register of Historic Places in Vermont
