= Theophilus Crawford House =

Historic house in Vermont, United States

- U.S. National Register of Historic Places
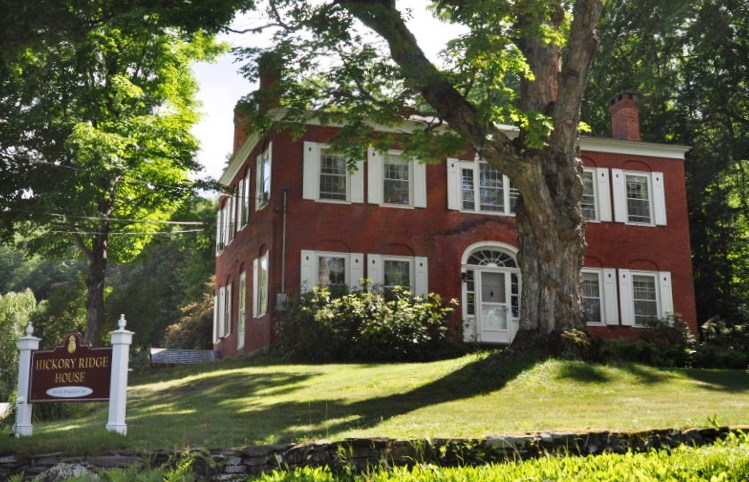

- Location within Vermont Location within the United States
- Location: 53 Hickory Ridge Road S., Putney, Vermont
- Coordinates: 42°59′55″N 72°32′14″W
- Area: 12 acres (4.9 ha)
- Architectural style: Federal
- NRHP reference No.: 95000175
- Added to NRHP: March 9, 1995

The Theophilus Crawford House is a historic house at 53 Hickory Ridge Road South in Putney, Vermont. Built about 1808, it is one of the oldest brick houses in Putney, and one of its finest examples of Federal architecture in brick. It was listed on the National Register of Historic Places in 1995. Its current owners operate it as the Hickory Ridge House Bed and Breakfast Inn.

== Description and history ==
The Crawford House is located north of Putney Village, on the south side of Hickory Ridge Road, just south of the private Grammar School. It is a 2 1/2-story brick structure, with a side gable roof and granite foundation. The north and east walls are laid in Flemish bond, and the other two sides are laid in American bond. A two-story gable-roofed wood-frame ell extends south from the main block. The front facade, facing north to the street, is symmetrically arranged, with a center entry framed by sidelight windows and topped by a fanlight window. Above the entrance on the second level is a Palladian window; the remaining windows are rectangular sash windows, set below blind semi-oval transoms. The interior retains significant original woodwork and hardware.

The house was built in 1807-09 by Theophilus Crawford, a local farmer and sawmill owner. Crawford regularly traveled to Boston, Massachusetts to sell his dairy products, and is said to have brought the window glass from there. The brick was probably sourced at a local brickyard in East Putney. It was probably the first brick house to be built in the town, and is one of the first relatively high-style Federal houses to be built in southeastern Vermont. It remained in the Crawford family until 1913, a relatively long period for the region. It has housed a bed and breakfast inn since 1986.

== See also ==
- National Register of Historic Places listings in Windham County, Vermont
