= The Greenwood School (Putney, Vermont) =

Location
- 14 Greenwood Lane, Putney, Vermont; 42.976093°N 72.552729°W

Information
- Established: 1978
- Headmaster: Sergio W. Simunovic
- Faculty: 20
- Grades: 6-12
- Enrollment: 48 boarding, 1 day
- Campus size: 100 acres (40 ha)
- Website: http://www.greenwood.org

The Greenwood School is a specialized boarding and day school for students in grades 6 through 12. Greenwood is situated on a 100-acre campus outside the village of Putney, Vermont in the southeastern part of the state. The Greenwood School is accredited by the New England Association of Schools and Colleges (NEASC), approved by the state of Vermont, and is a member of the National Association of Independent Schools (NAIS).

== History ==
Therapeutic based hands-on learning. They believed that the education of children who were underachievers, who were diagnosed as "dyslexic" or as having "attention difficulties" was best addressed by giving them intellectual and creative challenges in the classroom using discussion and verbal instruction. Learning was adapted to the students' natural strengths and aptitudes. Because the Scheidler's design for the school embedded a variety of learning experiences in a challenging pre-prep curriculum, Greenwood was not a "special school", but an enriched pre-preparatory program tailored to meet the needs of specific students.

Class days included tutorial help in rote skills, especially reading and writing, but by tailoring the entire program to meet student needs and focusing on their method of teaching via oral tradition, the Scheidlers kept costs down for families and schools.

The curriculum included all elementary and middle school subjects, as well as other required courses. The curriculum included structured exercises in the spoken word, visual art, manual skills and dramatics for all students, in recognition of the enhanced imaginations, visual memory and auditory skills of many Greenwood students and the need to develop students' oral communication skills.

Tom Scheidler published articles about his work using guided imagery (psychosynthesis) techniques with Greenwood students, and concerning his utilization of metaphor to help students get past psychological and emotional barriers to learning. He lectured internationally and also served on the board of the New England Association of Schools and Colleges (NEASC). His work combined with Andrea Scheidler's speech, performance and visual art curriculum to encourage imagination, foster attention and self-discipline. The Scheidlers discovered that when students who were "acting out" were helped to channel energies into theater, storytelling and speech, students gained confidence and social skills that benefited them later in life.

== Philosophy and academics ==
Today, Greenwood is a Special School for students with a variety of academic learning challenges. With a 2:1 student to teacher ratio, classes are small at the Greenwood School, ranging from 1 to 10 students. Greenwood's remedial language program uses a diagnostic-prescriptive approach, including the Lindamood-Bell and Orton Gillingham methods. The program targets all aspects of literacy, including phonology, phonics, morphology, and orthography. Students spend one hour a day in a language tutorial to study and practice reading, spelling, comprehension, handwriting, and writing from dictation. All instruction is multisensory, structured, sequential, and sensitive to students’ individual learning styles. Because written work is such a difficult process for most students with a language-based learning disability, Greenwood students spend an additional period in writing instruction. Assistive technology programs such as Dragon NaturallySpeaking, Inspiration and Kurzweil are used to aid students in the writing process. The language remediation described above is combined with an academic curriculum that includes science, history, literature, art, music, crafts, and athletics. Twice daily study halls train students to apply skills independently. All students attend weekly group social pragmatics lessons, and for some students speech and language therapy, occupational therapy, and/or additional social pragmatics are also part of Greenwood's academic program.

== Facilities ==
Boarding students live in the Greenwood dormitory, which has twenty-four student rooms, four faculty apartments, and three common rooms. The dorm is designed to allow developmental grouping. The remainder of the resident teachers live in adjacent buildings.

The academic center houses the school library and assembly room, the dining hall, a STEM center, and 12 classrooms. A long time partnership with the Yellow Barn Music School and Festival has added nine eco-friendly, cabin-like classroom spaces that Yellow Barn uses as rehearsal spaces during the summer and Greenwood uses as supplemental classrooms during the school year.

The gym, which includes an outdoor skate park and climbing wall, is used for physical education and large gatherings. The campus also includes an expanded woodshop and pottery studio and an administrative building.

== Sports and recreation ==
A gym teacher and four coaches head a variety of seasonal sports and outdoor activities, including interscholastic soccer, basketball, and baseball as well as mountain biking, rock climbing, outdoor leadership, orienteering, cross-country skiing and downhill skiing. A network of trails that wind through the 100-acre (0.40 km^{2}) campus are used for hiking, mountain biking, and cross-country skiing. A 2-acre (8,100 m^{2}) pond is available for science classes, fishing, and boating; and the campus has an outdoor skate/bike park and dirt jump area. The winter sports program includes a weekend trip to Mount Snow for downhill skiing, snowboarding and terrain park. Outdoor activities are emphasized, the gym facility was originally intended to be a covered basketball court for use during rainy days.

== Vacation program ==
The Greenwood School runs the CONNECT Program, a community service-learning program for boys with learning differences.

== National recognition ==
The Greenwood School was featured on Public Television's National Education Report in 2007.

In February 2013, The Greenwood School announced that they were going to work together with Ken Burns on the documentary The Address. The film was aired on PBS in the spring of 2014.

The school also was known for hosting the first annual Learn The Address national competition in 2014, where students from chosen schools would compete while reciting The Gettysburg Address. The national competition ran until 2017 in which other schools have hosted it.
