= Putney (CDP), Vermont =

Census-designated place in Vermont, United States

Putney, Vermont
- Census-designated place
- Location within Vermont Location within the United States
- Coordinates: 42°58′33″N 72°31′33″W
- Country: United States
- State: Vermont
- County: Windham
- Town: Putney

Area
  - Total: 1.41 sq mi (3.64 km^{2})
  - Land: 1.40 sq mi (3.63 km^{2})
  - Water: 0.0039 sq mi (0.01 km^{2})
- Elevation: 489 ft (149 m)

Population (2020)
  - Total: 571
- Time zone: UTC-5 (Eastern (EST))
  - Summer (DST): UTC-4 (EDT)
- ZIP Code: 05346
- Area code: 802
- FIPS code: 50-57625
- GNIS feature ID: 2584792

Putney is the primary village and a census-designated place (CDP) in the town of Putney, Windham County, Vermont, United States. As of the 2020 census, it had a population of 571, compared to 2,617 in the entire town. The Putney Village Historic District occupies the center of the CDP.

== Geography ==
The CDP is in eastern Windham County, on the southern edge of the town of Putney. It is bordered to the south by the town of Dummerston. U.S. Route 5 serves as the village's Main Street; it leads north 13 miles (21 km) to Bellows Falls and south 9 miles (14 km) to Brattleboro.

Sacketts Brook, a south-flowing tributary of the Connecticut River flows through the CDP. The village is sited where the brook drops 100 feet (30 m) in 0.2 miles (0.32 km).
