= Stewartiella =

Scientific classification
- Kingdom: Plantae
- Clade: Embryophytes
- Clade: Tracheophytes
- Clade: Angiosperms
- Clade: Eudicots
- Clade: Asterids
- Order: Apiales
- Family: Apiaceae
- Genus: Stewartiella; Nasir

Synonyms
- Ferula crucifolia Gilli; Stewartiella baluchistanica Nasir

Genus of flowering plants

Stewartiella is a monotypic genus of flowering plants belonging to the family Apiaceae. According to Kew; it only contains one known species, Stewartiella crucifolia (Gilli) Hedge & Lamond

It is native to Afghanistan and Pakistan.

The genus name of Stewartiella is in honour of Ralph Randles Stewart (1890–1993), an American botanist who spent his career teaching and studying plants in Pakistan. The Latin specific epithet of crucifolia is derived from 'cruciform' meaning tortured. It was first described and published in Fl. W. Pakistan Vol.20 on page 152 in 1972. The species was first published in Fl. Iranica Vol.162 on page 213 in 1987.

Another species such as Stewartiella baluchistanica Nasir is deemed to be a synonym by Kew. The genus of Stewartiella is recognized by the United States Department of Agriculture and the Agricultural Research Service, but they do not list any known species.
