= Putney Village Historic District =

Historic district in Vermont, United States

- U.S. National Register of Historic Places
- U.S. Historic district
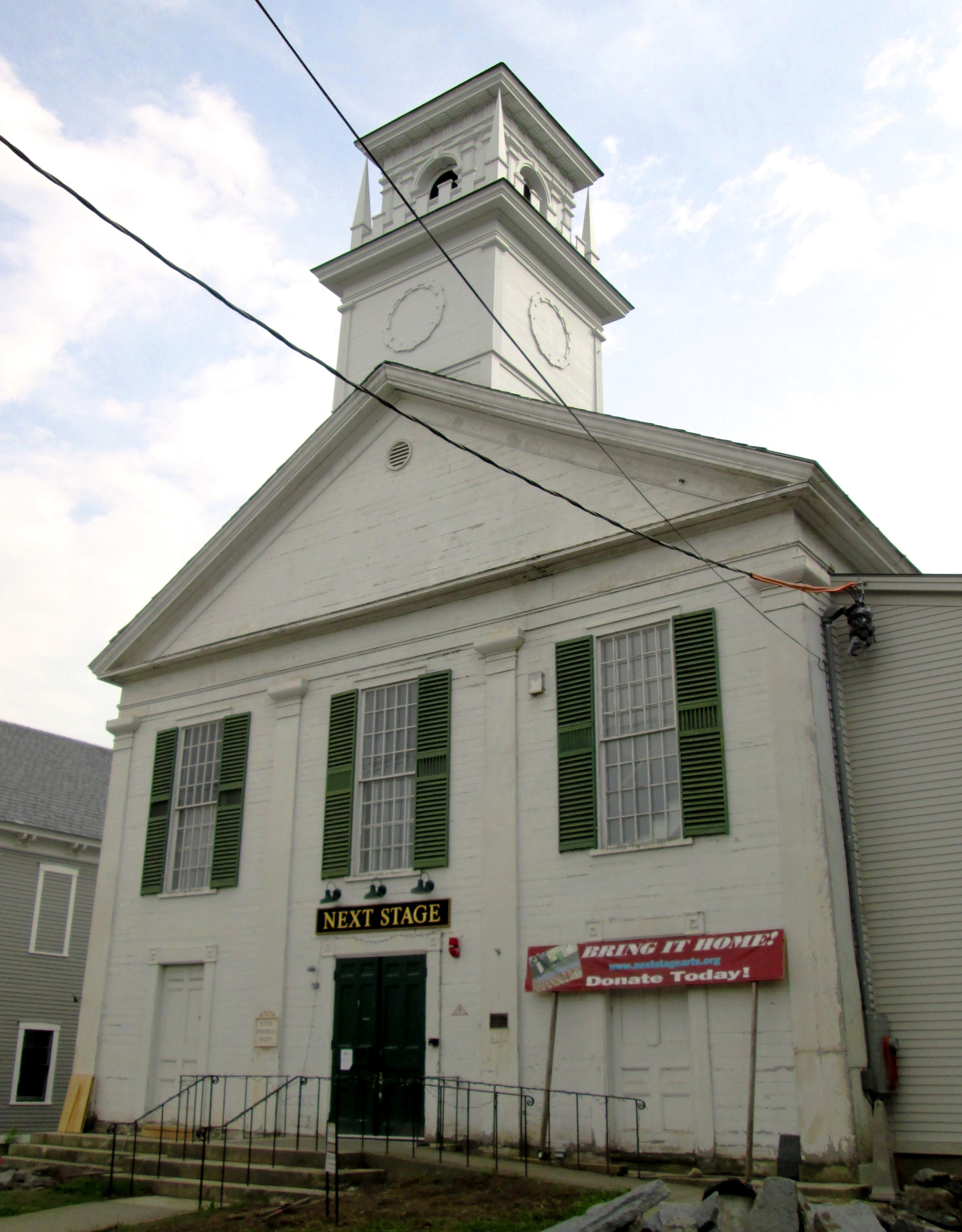
- The former Putney Federated Church, built in 1841, now the Next Stage Arts Project and the headquarters of the Putney Historical Society (2016)

- Location within Vermont Location within the United States
- Location: Westminster W Rd., US 5, Christian Sq., Old US 5, and Depot Rd., Putney, Vermont
- Coordinates: 42°58′30″N 72°31′27″W
- Area: 140 acres (57 ha)
- Built: 1753
- Architectural style: Greek Revival, Late Victorian, Federal
- NRHP reference No.: 86000324
- Added to NRHP: February 20, 1986

The Putney Village Historic District encompasses most of the main village and town center of Putney, Vermont. Settled in the 1760s, the village saw its major growth in the late 18th and early 19th century, and includes a cohesive collection with Federal and Greek Revival buildings, with a more modest number of important later additions, including the Italianate town hall. The district was listed on the National Register of Historic Places in 1986.

== Description and history ==
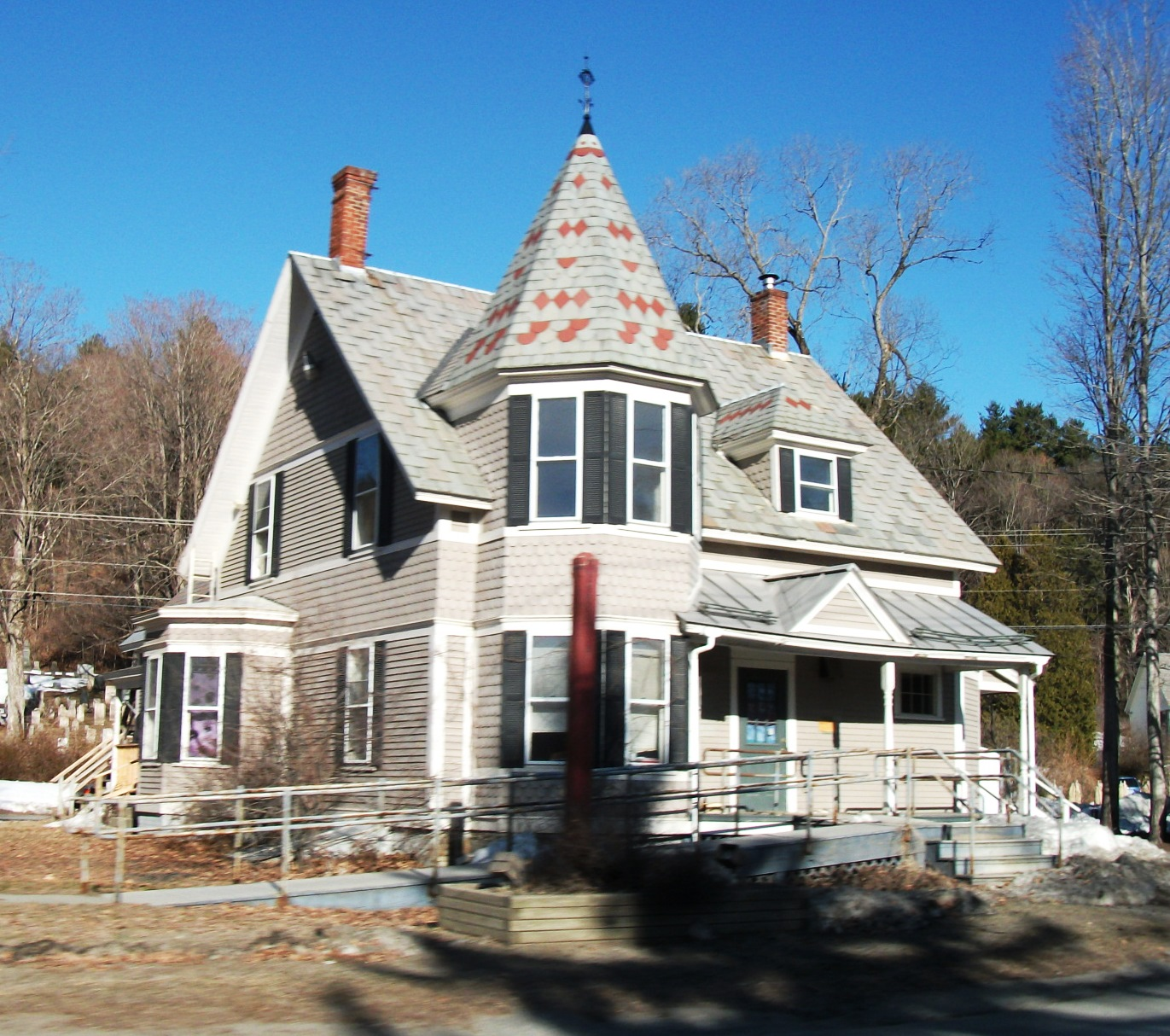
A vernacular Queen Anne-style Victorian house, built c.1905, at 79 Main Street in Putney

The town of Putney was chartered by New Hampshire colonial governor Benning Wentworth in 1753, but significant settlement did not begin until after French and Indian War ended in 1760.

The town arose in a large plain on the west side of the Connecticut River, above the mouth of Sacketts Brook. A falls on the brook provided water power for early mills, and it is around that point that the main village was formed. Because the town did not have abundant sources of water power, it was largely bypassed by the Industrial Revolution of the mid-19th century, and remained largely rural in character. The village's character is defined by the Federal and Greek Revival styles popular during its most significant period of growth, the late 18th to mid-19th century.

The historic district covers most of the present-day village of Putney. The spine of the district is United States Route 5, Kimball Hill, and Westminster West Road, roughly from Sand Hill Road in the north to the Interstate 91 interchange to the south. It includes a number of buildings on adjacent side roads, including all of Old Depot Road (a spur road terminated near the highway), and a portion of Old Route 5. Most of the residences in the district are Greek Revival in style, although there are a fair number of earlier Federal period buildings, as well as a handful of later ones, including a few vernacular Queen Anne houses. There are two churches (Methodist and Congregationalist), both Greek Revival buildings dating to the 1840s. Not surviving is an 1841 chapel of a Christian perfection movement, which was an active religious force here; its adherents later founded the Oneida Community in Upstate New York; the building burned in 1970. The town hall, the village's main municipal civic structure, is an Italianate hall built in 1871, and the large Colonial Revival Central School was added in 1906.

== Gallery ==
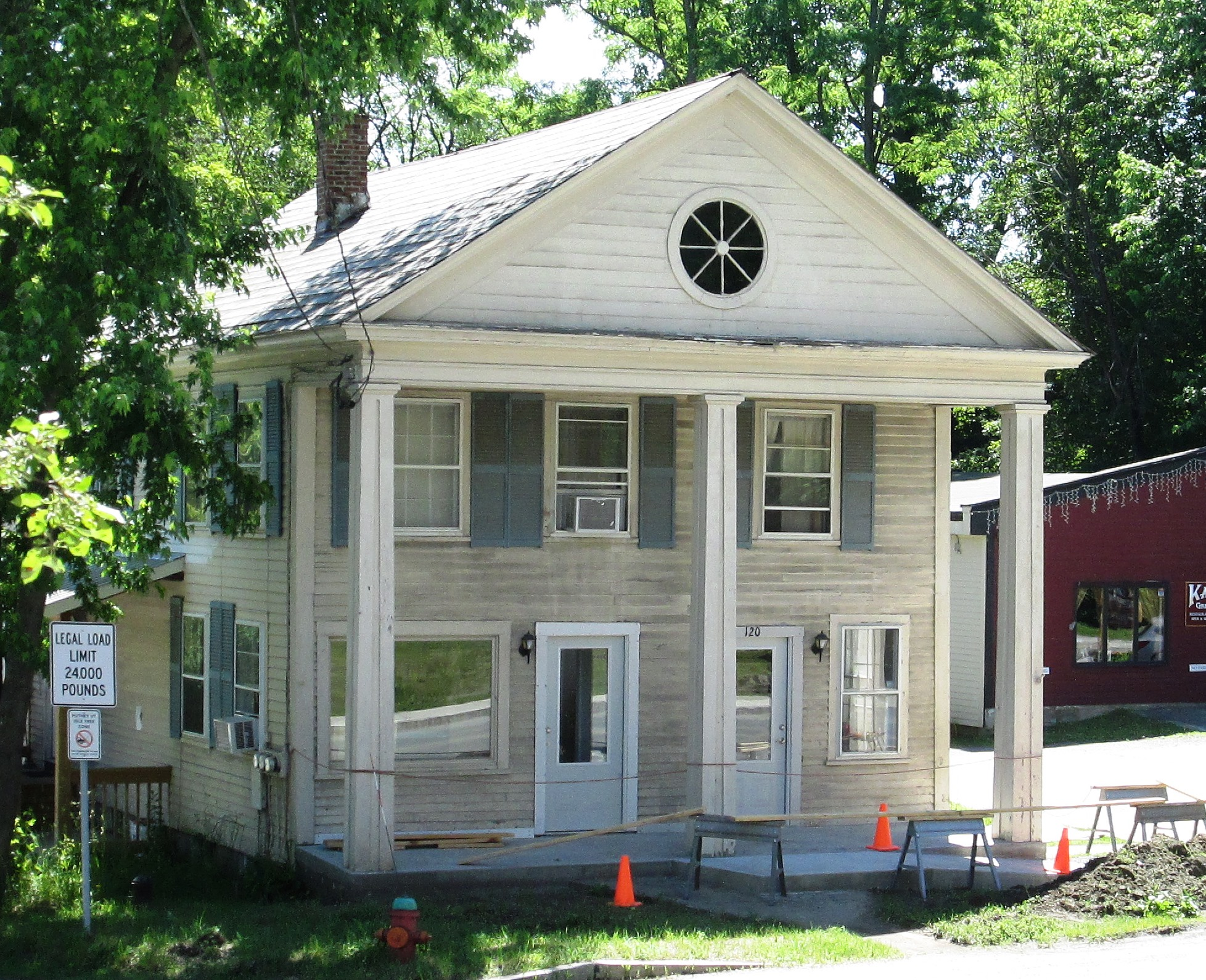
120 Main Street was built c.1835 in the Greek Revival style

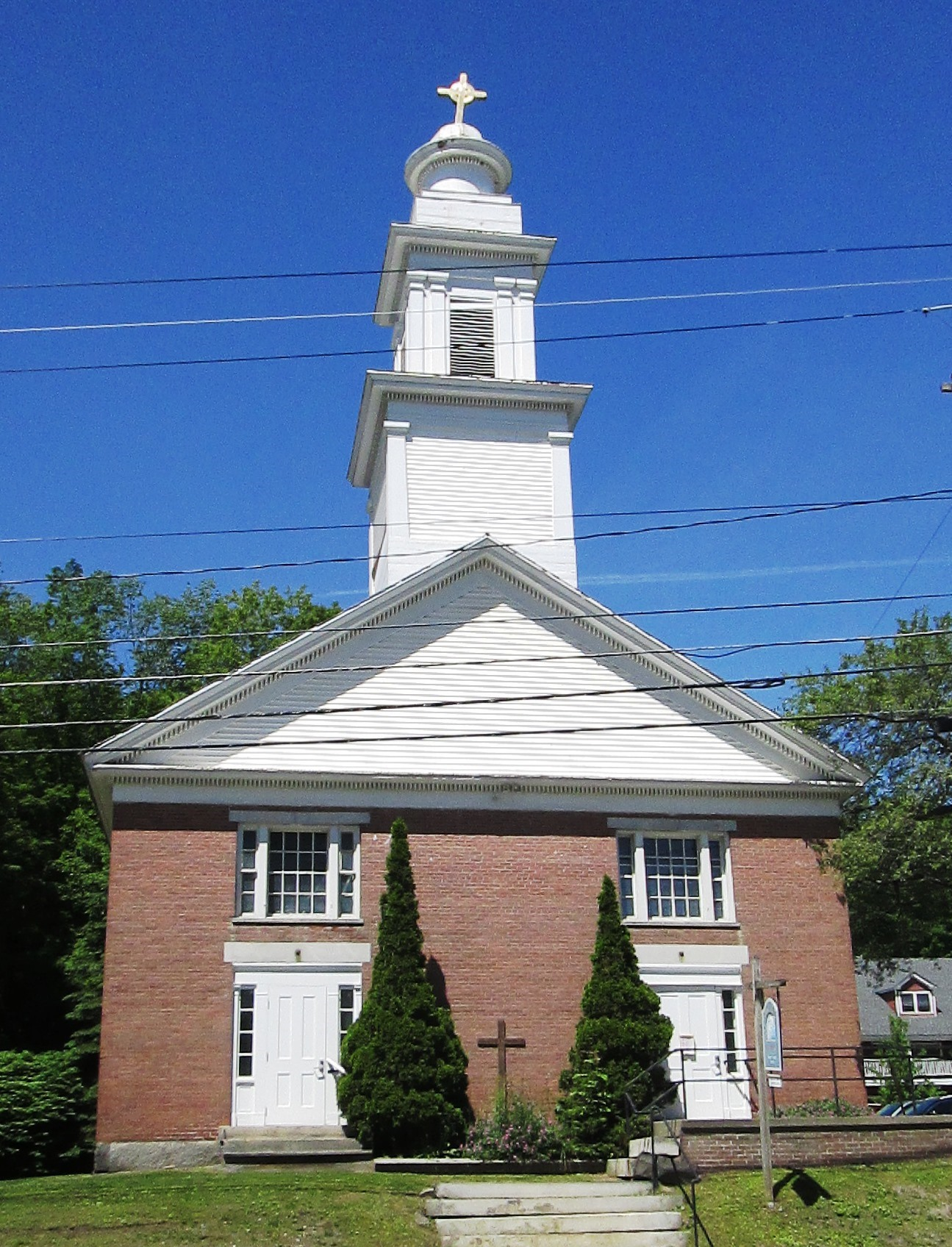
Our Lady of Mercy Roman Catholic Church, formerly the Putney Methodist Church, built in 1842

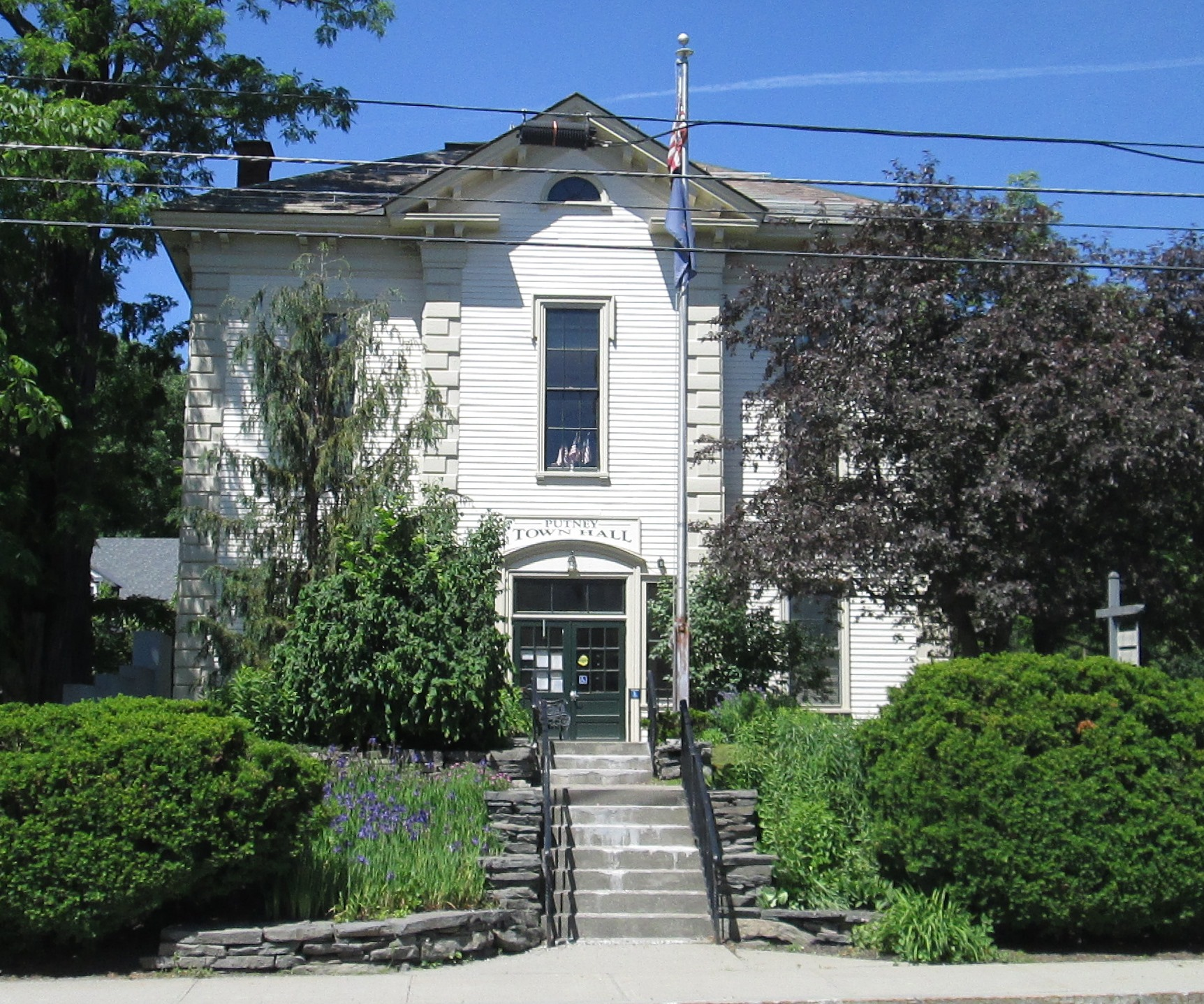
Putney Town Hall, built in 1871

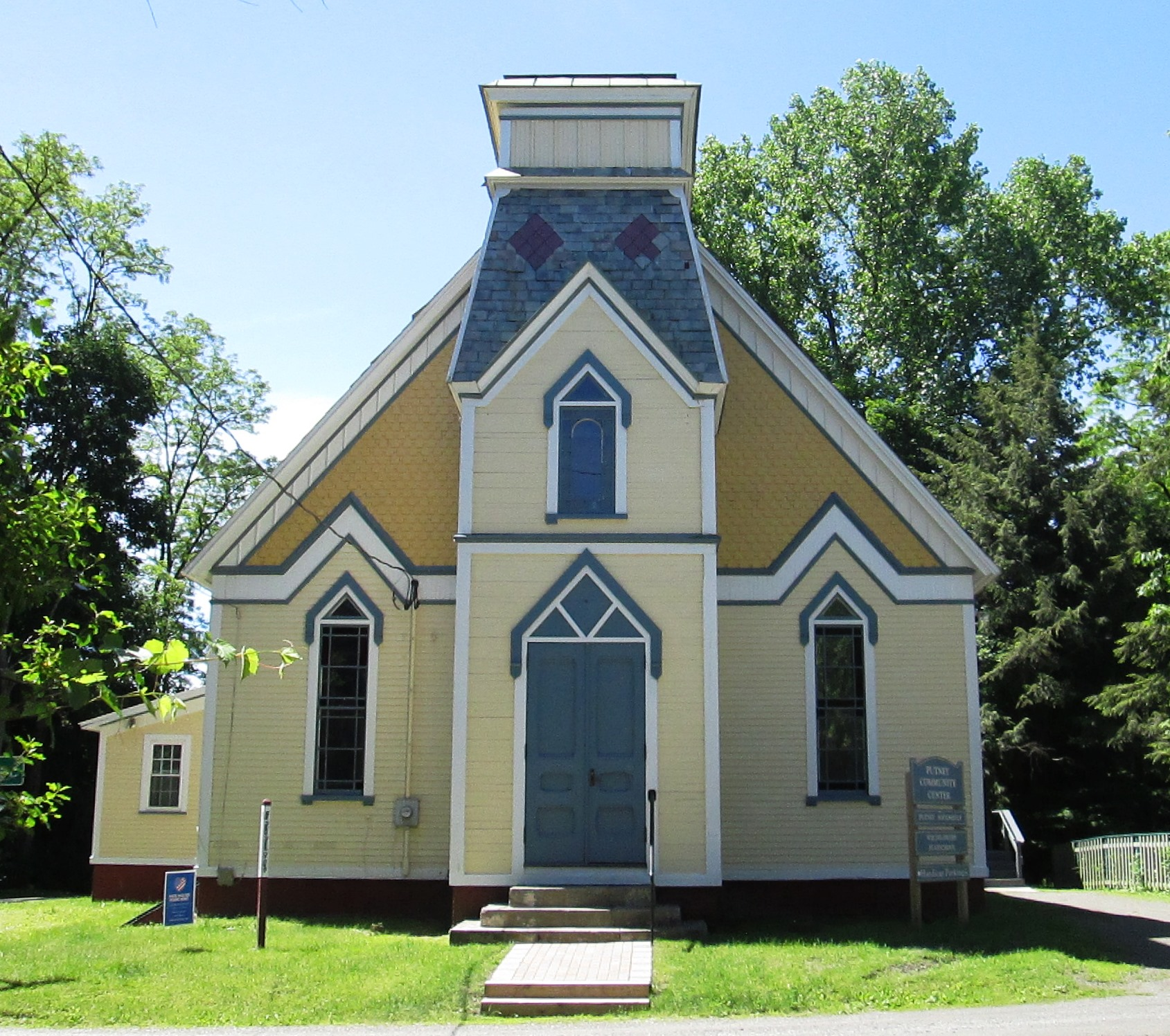
Putney Community Center, built in 1884 as the Putney Baptist Church

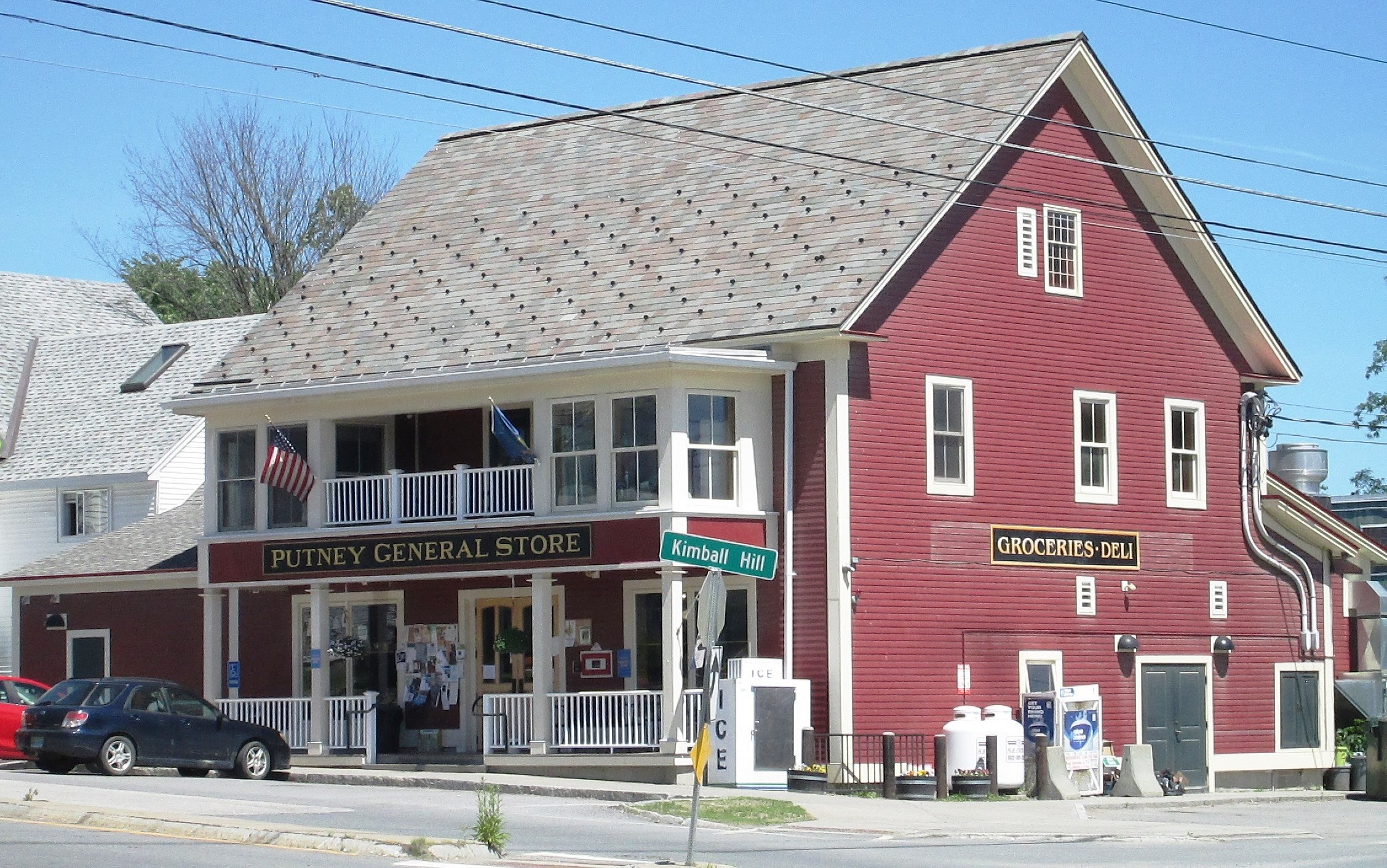
Putney General Store, built 1840-1900

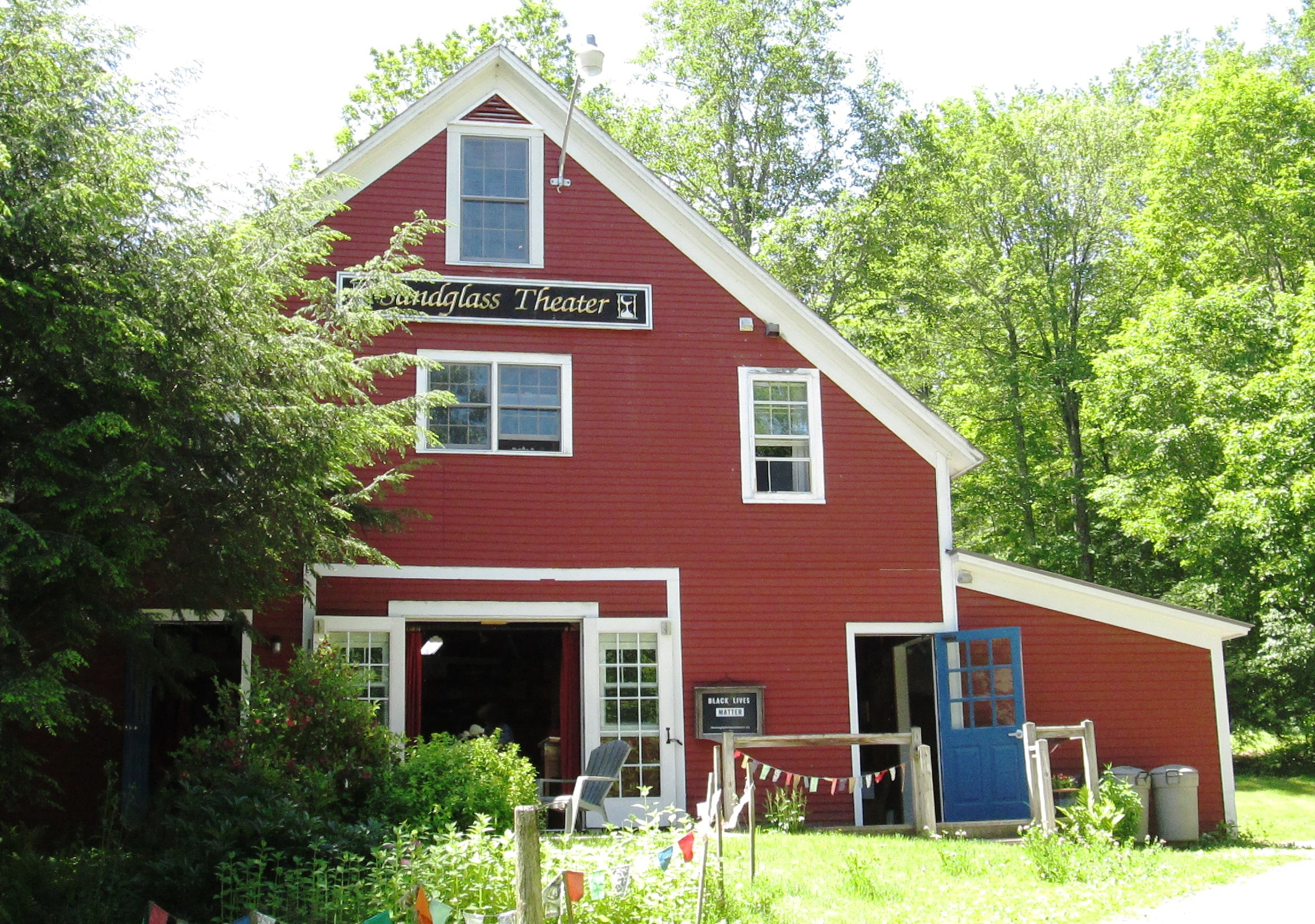
Sandglass Puppet Theater was built in 1915 as a livery stable

== See also ==
- National Register of Historic Places listings in Windham County, Vermont
