= Sabin–Wheat Farm =

- U.S. National Register of Historic Places
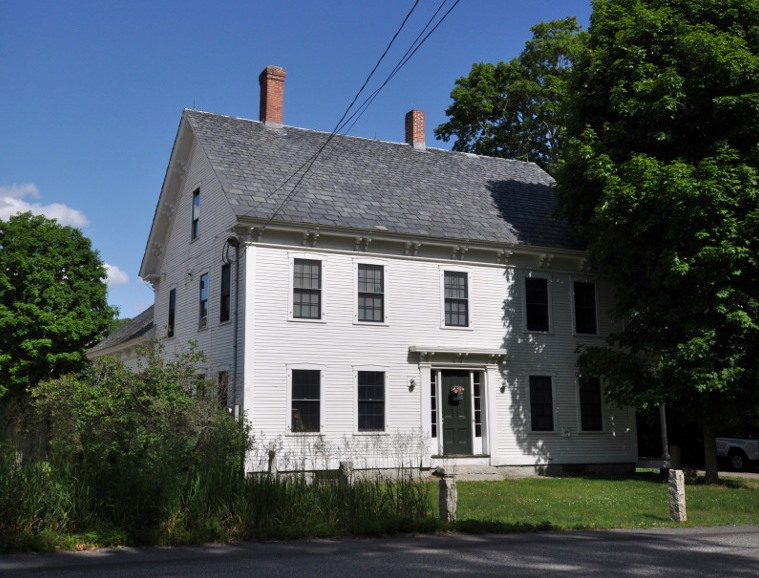

- Location within Vermont Location within the United States
- Location: 346 Westminster Rd., Putney, Vermont
- Coordinates: 42°59′58″N 72°31′55″W
- Area: 2.2 acres (0.89 ha)
- Built: 1790
- Architectural style: Italianate, Early Republic
- NRHP reference No.: 04000771
- Added to NRHP: July 28, 2004

The Sabin–Wheat Farm is a historic farmstead at 348 Westminster Road in Putney, Vermont, United States. Established about 1790 and subject to major alterations in the 1860s, it is a well-preserved and little-altered example of a 19th-century New England connected farmstead. It was listed on the National Register of Historic Places in 2004.

== Description and history ==
The Sabin Wheat Farm stands on the east side of Westminster Road, about 2 miles (3.2 km) north of Putney village, just north of the road's crossing of Sackett's Brook. The farmstead stands close to the road, on 2.2 acres (0.89 ha) that are surrounded by working agricultural fields. The principal feature of the farmstead is the main house, an Italianate structure at the front of the complex that is one of the town's earliest examples of the style. Extending behind it are a kitchen ell, a long shed, and two attached barns, all built or moved to the site in the early 1860s.

The farm was established early in Putney's history, when Noah Sabin purchased the surrounding land and built a house in 1768, probably across the street from the present house. The present house has at its core Sabin's second house, a Federal period structure built c. 1780-90. The farm was owned by Sabins until 1839, when it was sold to a cousin Samuel Wheat, Jr. Wheat, a prosperous farmer, was responsible for the transformation of the 1780s farmstead into the connected complex that we see in largely unaltered form today. For much of the 20th century the farm was worked as a dairy operation by the Braley family.

== See also ==
- National Register of Historic Places listings in Windham County, Vermont
