= Putney, Vermont =

- Town
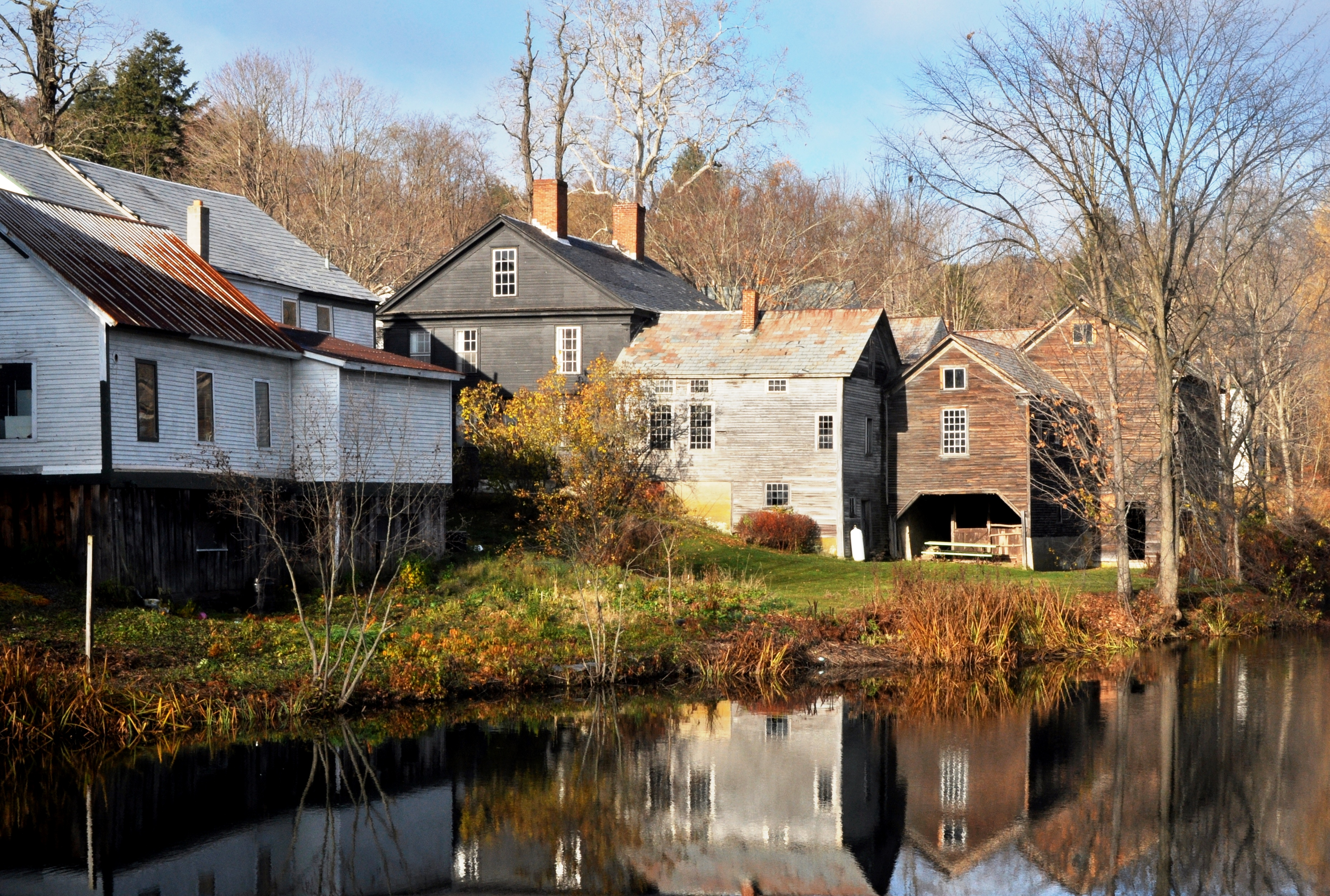
- Sacketts Brook in downtown Putney (2009)

- Seal

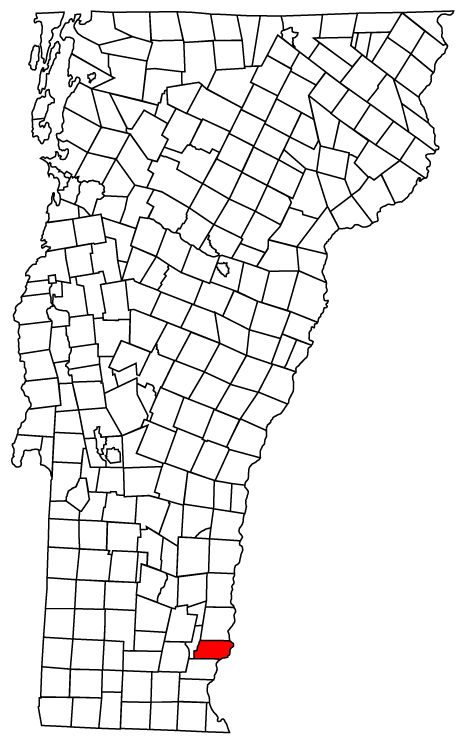
- Putney, Vermont
- Coordinates: 43°00′15″N 72°31′12″W
- Country: United States
- State: Vermont
- County: Windham
- Communities: Putney; East Putney

Area
  - Total: 26.8 sq mi (69.4 km^{2})
  - Land: 26.8 sq mi (69.4 km^{2})
  - Water: 0 sq mi (0.0 km^{2})
- Elevation: 410 ft (120 m)

Population (2020)
  - Total: 2,617
  - Density: 98/sq mi (37.7/km^{2})
- Time zone: UTC−5 (Eastern (EST))
  - Summer (DST): UTC−4 (EDT)
- ZIP Code: 05346
- Area code: 802
- FIPS code: 50-57700
- GNIS feature ID: 1462181
- Website: www.putneyvt.gov

Putney is a town in Windham County, Vermont, United States. The population was 2,617 at the 2020 census.

The town's historic core makes up the Putney Village Historic District, which is listed on the National Register of Historic Places.

== History ==
On December 26, 1753, Colonel Josiah Willard led a proprietors' petition for a Putney charter to be established in the Equivalent Lands. The charter was issued that day by Governor Benning Wentworth – issuer of the New Hampshire Grants under the authority of King George II of Great Britain. Significant settlement of Putney did not begin until after the French and Indian War ended in 1763.

The town arose in a large plain on the west side of the Connecticut River, above the mouth of Sacketts Brook. A falls on the brook provided water power for early mills, and it is around that point that the main village was formed. Because the town did not have abundant sources of water power, it was largely bypassed by the Industrial Revolution of the mid-19th century, and remained largely rural in character. The village's character is defined by the Federal and Greek Revival styles popular during its most significant period of growth, the late 18th to mid-19th century.

Historical population
Census	Pop.	Note	%±
1790	1,848		—
1800	1,574		−14.8%
1810	1,607		2.1%
1820	1,547		−3.7%
1830	1,510		−2.4%
1840	1,382		−8.5%
1850	1,425		3.1%
1860	1,163		−18.4%
1870	1,167		0.3%
1880	1,124		−3.7%
1890	1,075		−4.4%
1900	969		−9.9%
1910	788		−18.7%
1920	761		−3.4%
1930	835		9.7%
1940	904		8.3%
1950	1,019		12.7%
1960	1,177		15.5%
1970	1,727		46.7%
1980	1,850		7.1%
1990	2,352		27.1%
2000	2,634		12.0%
2010	2,702		2.6%
2020	2,617		−3.1%
U.S. Decennial Census

== Geography ==
According to the United States Census Bureau, the town has a total area of 26.8 square miles (69.4 km^{2}), of which 26.76 square miles (69.4 km^{2}) is land and 0.04% is water. Putney Mountain is the highest point in the town, rising 1,657 ft above sea level.

Putney is bordered by Dummerston to the south, Westminster to the north, and Brookline to the west. The Connecticut River serves as the eastern border of Putney, separating the town from Westmoreland, NH. Putney village is in the southern part of the town, along U.S. Route 5 and Sacketts Brook. Putney is approximately 10 miles (16 km) north of Brattleboro and 25 miles (40 km) northwest of Keene, New Hampshire.

== Transportation ==
U.S. Route 5 and Interstate 91 both pass through Putney, which is accessible from Interstate 91 at Exit 4 on the border of Putney and Dummerston.

The New England Central Railroad has track rights through the town. Amtrak's Vermonter passenger rail line runs through Putney but does not stop in town. The closest stations are Bellows Falls to the north and Brattleboro to the south.

== Demographics ==
As of the 2000 census there were 2,634 people, 958 households, and 603 families residing in the town. The population density was 98.3 people per square mile (37.9/km^{2}). There were 1,049 housing units at an average density of 39.1 per square mile (15.1/km^{2}). The racial makeup of the town was 95.63% White, 1.03% African American, 0.49% Native American, 0.76% Asian, 0.04% Pacific Islander, 0.30% from other races, and 1.75% from two or more races. Hispanic or Latino of any race were 1.56% of the population.

There were 958 households, out of which 32.5% had children under the age of 18 living with them, 50.5% were married couples living together, 8.5% had a female householder with no husband present, and 37.0% were non-families. 27.9% of all households were made up of individuals, and 7.0% had someone living alone who was 65 years of age or older. The average household size was 2.43 and the average family size was 2.99.

In the town, the population was spread out, with 22.6% under the age of 18, 16.5% from 18 to 24, 27.5% from 25 to 44, 23.7% from 45 to 64, and 9.8% who were 65 years of age or older. The median age was 36 years. For every 100 females, there were 106.3 males. For every 100 females age 18 and over, there were 108.0 males.

The median income for a household in the town was $40,346, and the median income for a family was $50,170. Males had a median income of $29,922 versus $25,217 for females. The per capita income for the town was $18,576. About 6.2% of families and 8.4% of the population were below the poverty line, including 8.5% of those under age 18 and 5.4% of those age 65 or over.

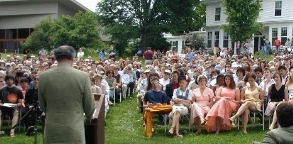
A graduation ceremony at The Putney School in 2004

== Education ==
- The Grammar School is an independent day school serving Preschool through Grade 8 with an emphasis on nature-based curriculum.
- The Putney School is a private independent co-educational boarding and day high school.
- Landmark College is the first college exclusively for students with learning disabilities.
- The Greenwood School is a boarding school for boys in grades 6–12 who have been diagnosed with dyslexia and/or related language-based learning disabilities.
- Putney Central School is the town's public school for Pre-K through grade 8

== Notable people ==
- George Aiken, US Senator and 64th governor of Vermont
- Pete Bernhard, musician, member of the band The Devil Makes Three
- George M. Darrow, horticulturalist and authority on small fruit
- Fernando Gerassi, painter
- Bob Gray, Olympic skier
- William B. Gray, United States Attorney for Vermont
- William Haile, merchant and politician
- Carmelita Hinton, progressive educator and founder of The Putney School
- Reid Hoffman, founder of LinkedIn, graduate of The Putney School
- John Irving, author, Academy Award winner, taught at Windham College
- Manon Kahle, actress
- Melissa Leo, actress
- Prescott Metcalf (1813–1891), eighth mayor of Erie, Pennsylvania
- Errol Morris, documentary filmmaker, MacArthur Fellowship recipient,
- John Humphrey Noyes, American utopian socialist
- Peter Shumlin, 81st governor of Vermont from 2011 to 2017
- Cyndy Szekeres, children's book author and illustrator
- Jody Williams, 1997 Nobel Peace Prize laureate
- John Henry Williams, son of baseball legend Ted Williams

== Notable places ==
- Theophilus Crawford House, a historic house dating from c. 1808, added to the National Register of Historic Places ("NRHP") in 1995
- East Putney Brook Stone Arch Bridge, built in 1902, added to the NRHP in 1976 (East Putney)
- Putney Village Historic District, the historic core of Putney Village, added to the NRHP in 1986
- Sabin-Wheat Farm, a farmstead establish c. 1790, added to the NRHP in 2004
- Sacketts Brook Stone Arch Bridge, known locally as the Hi-Lo Biddy Stone Arch Bridge, built in 1905, added to the NRHP in 1976
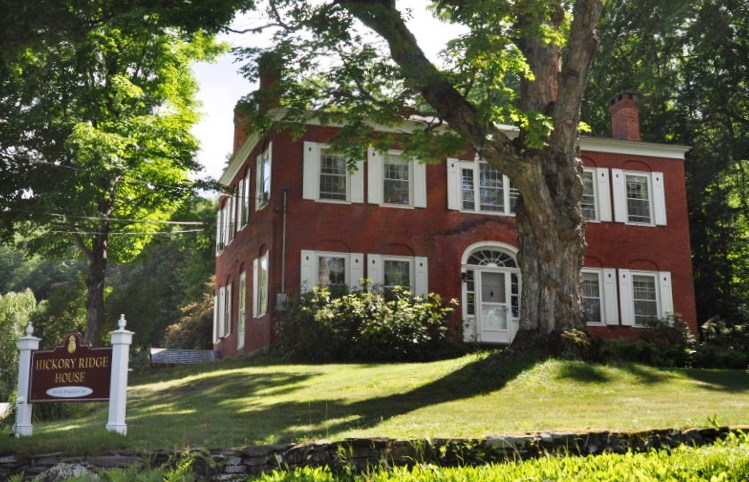
Theophilus Crawford House

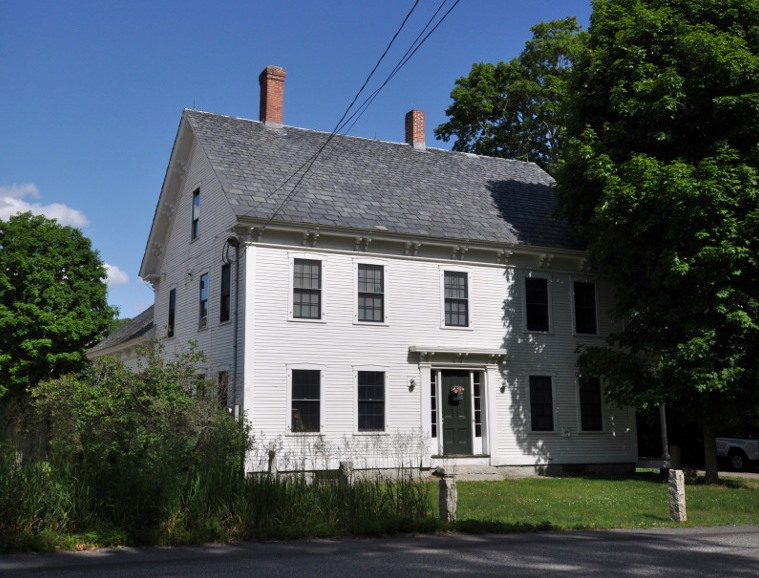
Sabin-Wheat Farm

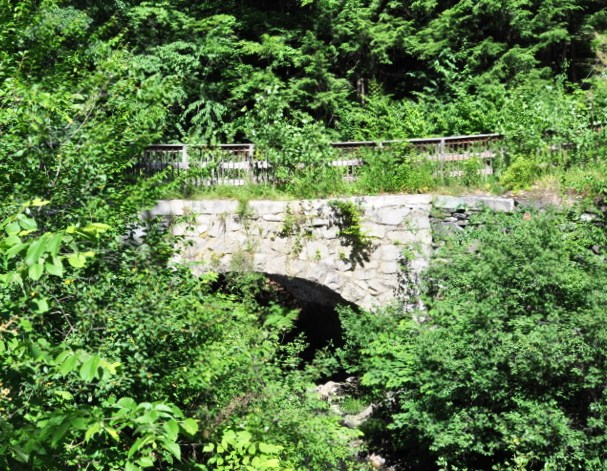
Sacketts Brook Stone Arch Bridge
Putney Village Historic District

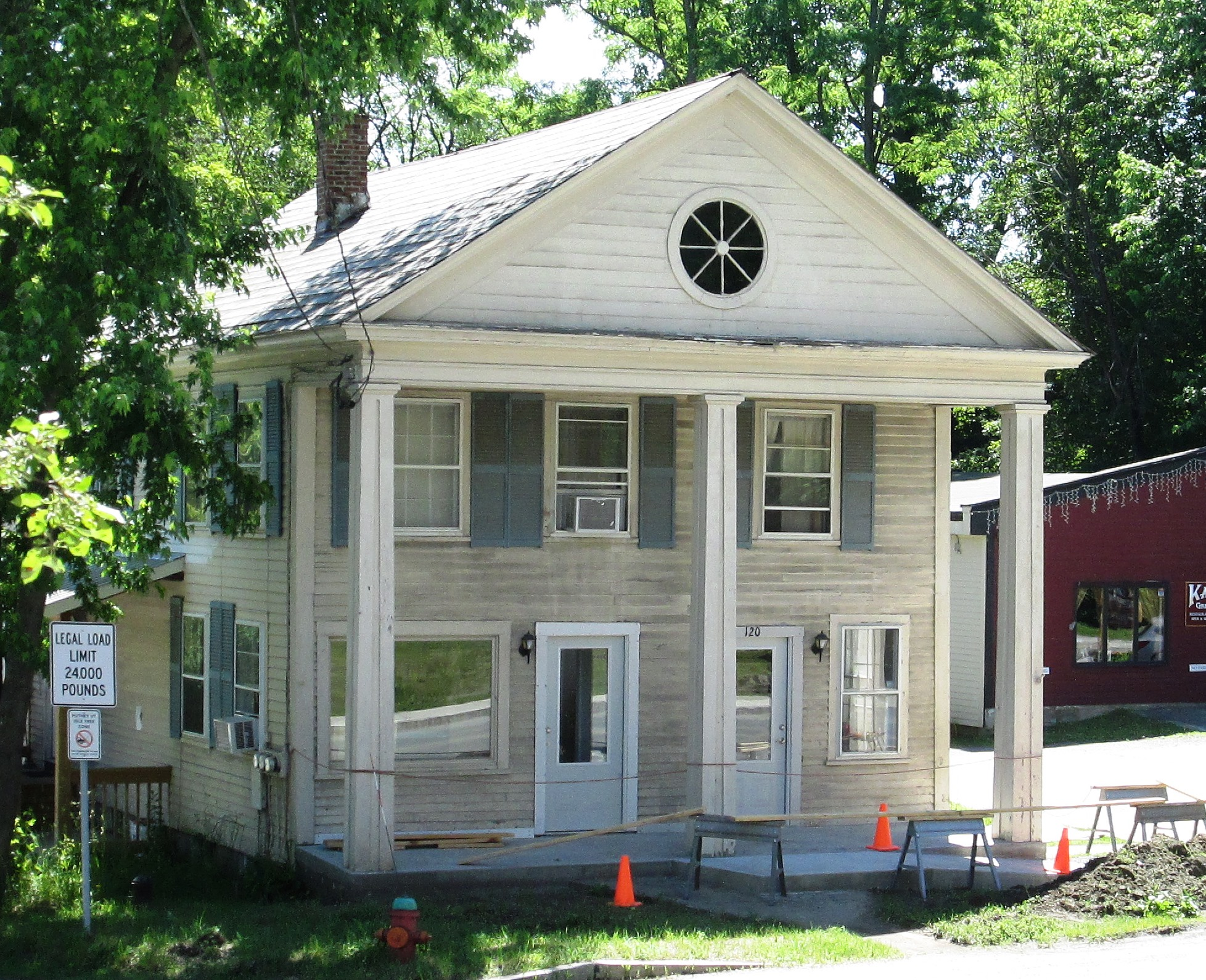
120 Main Street was built c. 1835 in the Greek Revival style

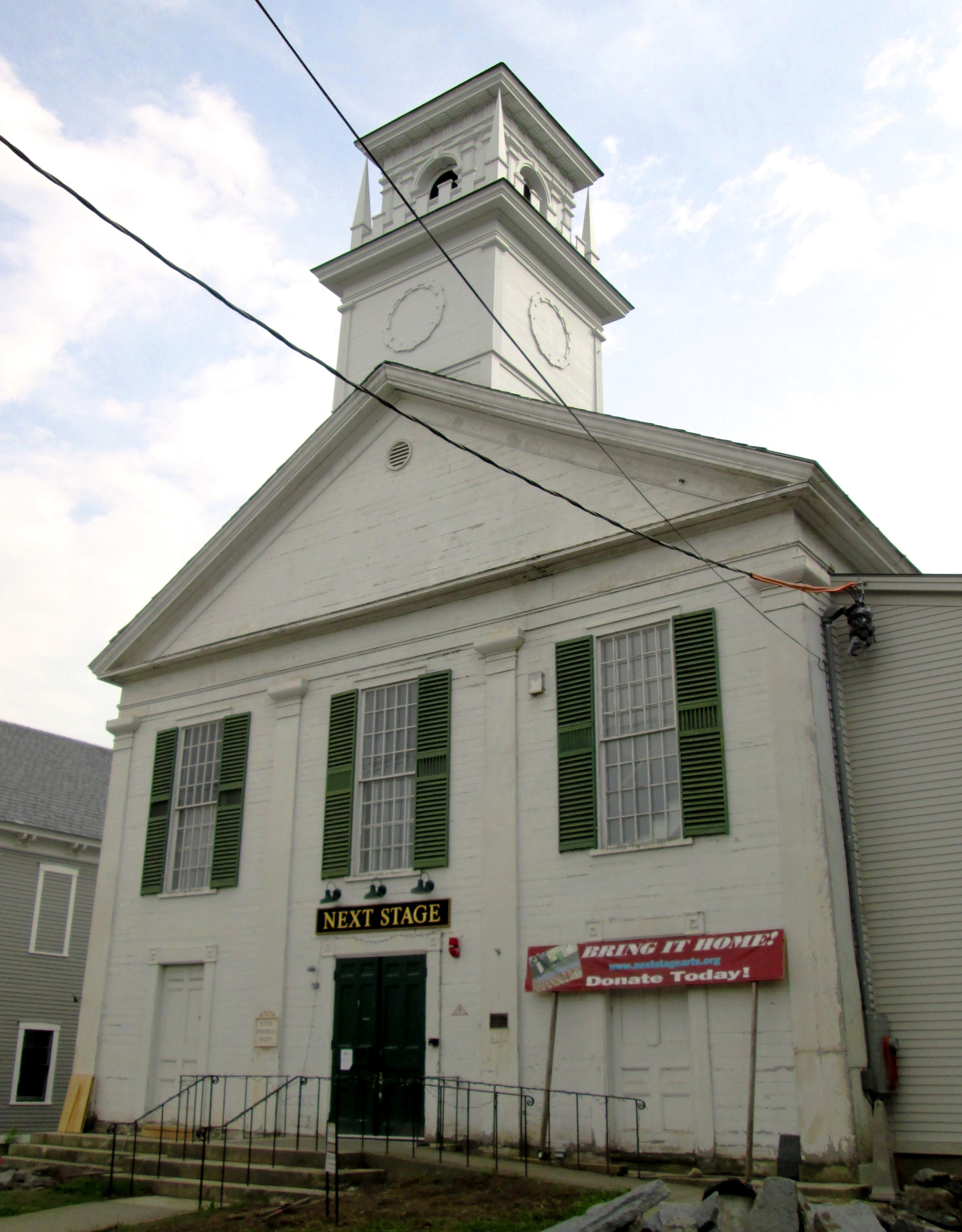
The former Putney Federated Church, built in 1841, now houses Next Stage Arts and the Putney Historical Society

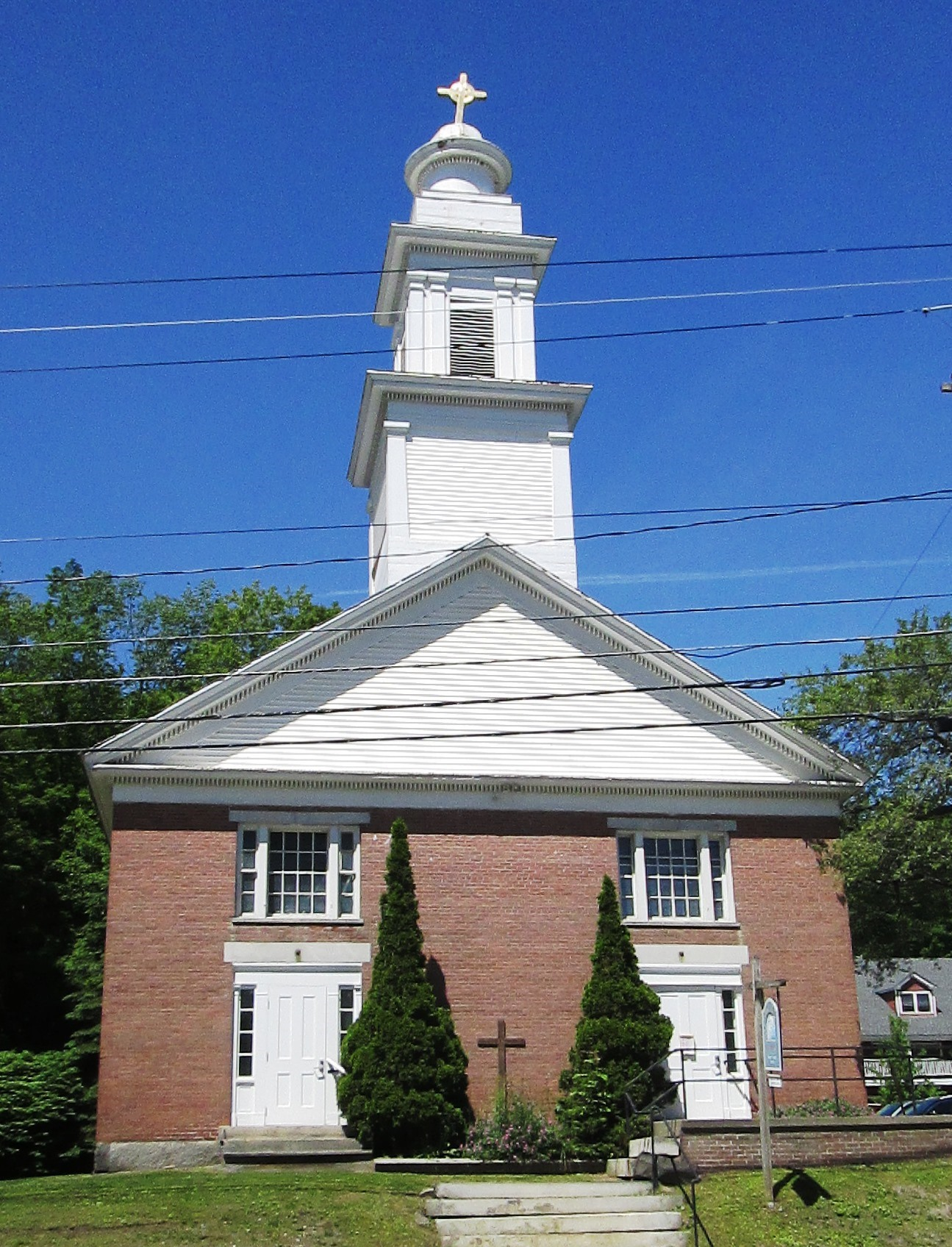
Our Lady of Mercy Roman Catholic Church, formerly the Putney Methodist Church, built in 1842

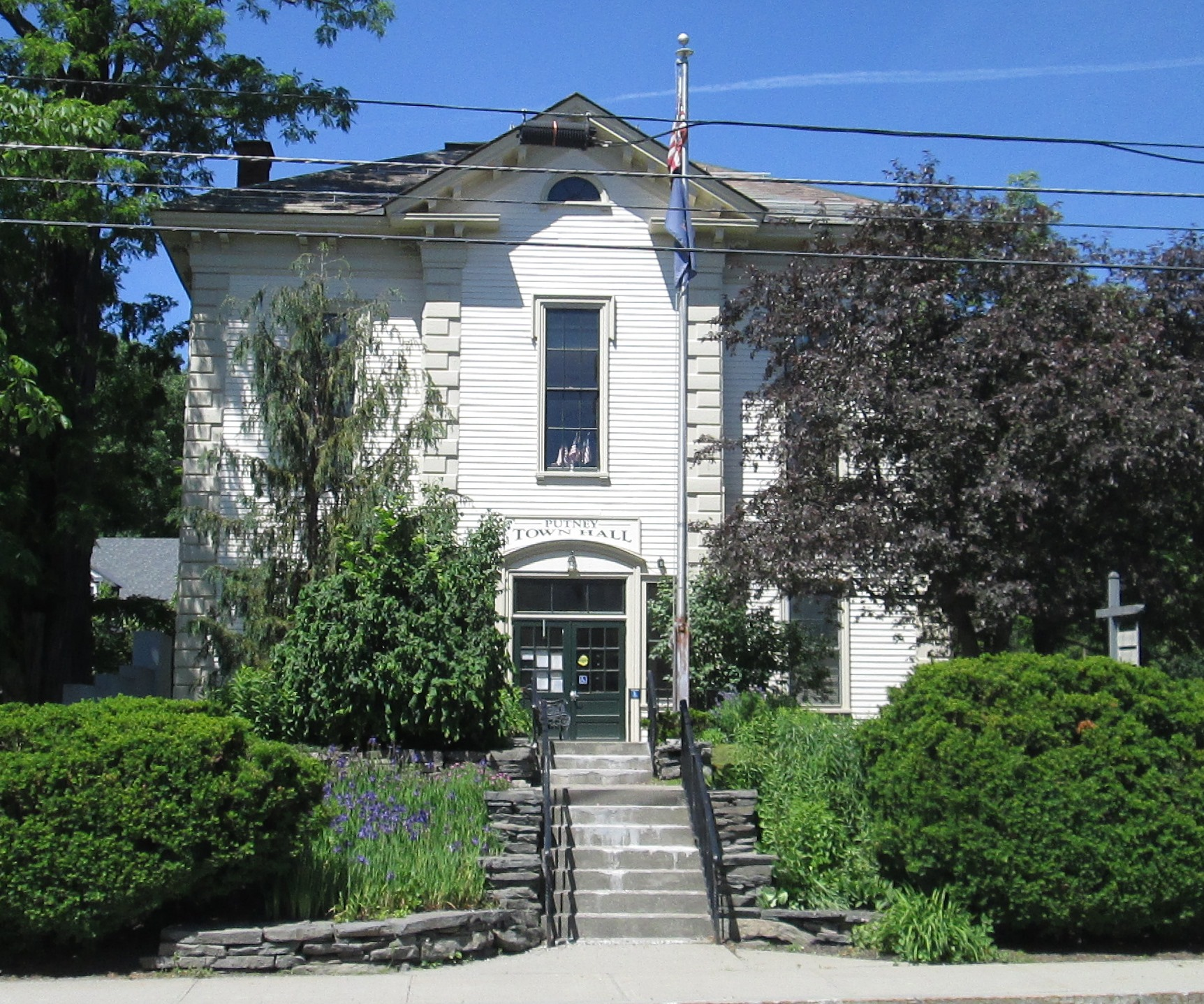
Putney Town Hall, built in 1871

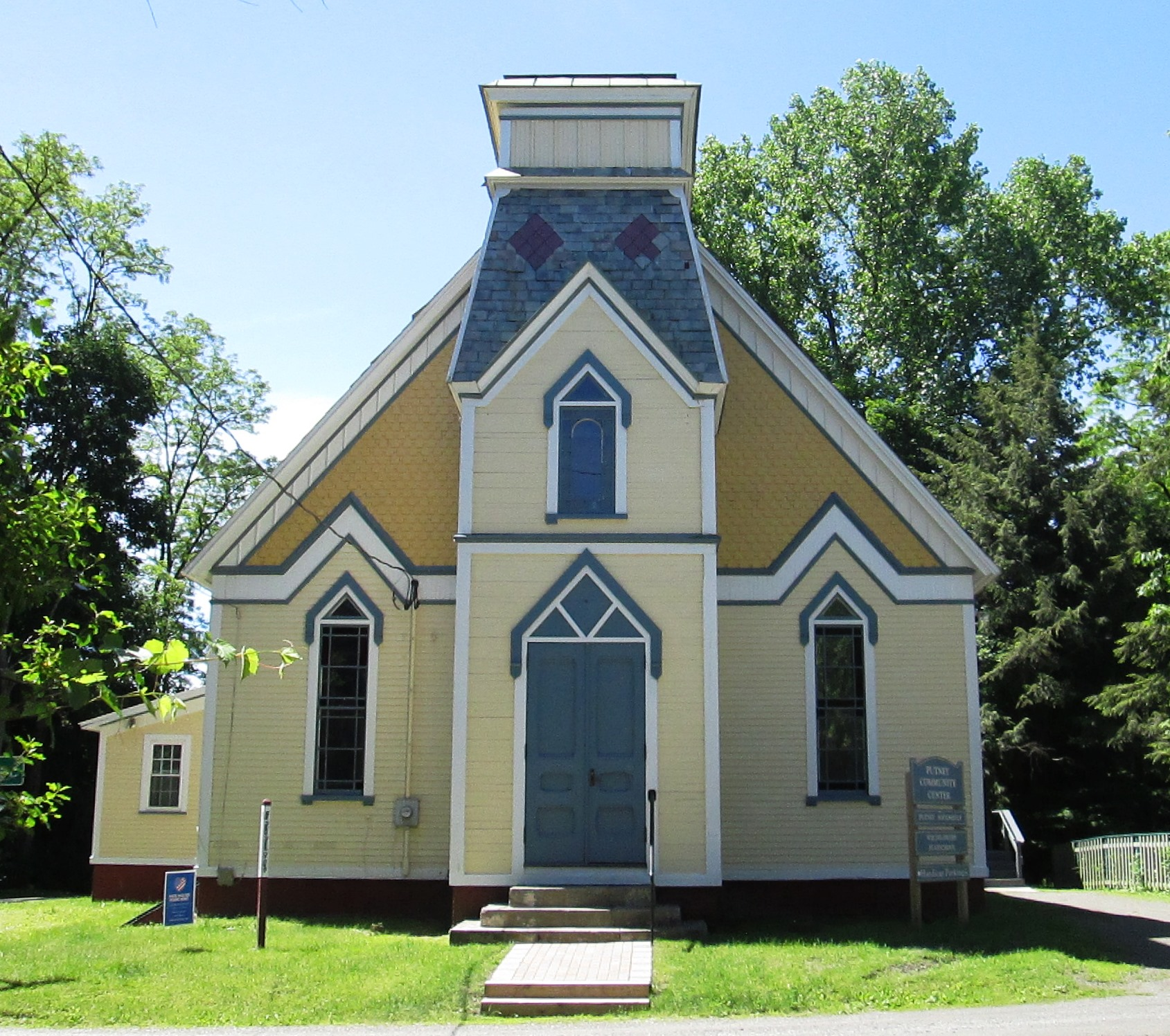
Putney Community Center, built in 1884 as the Putney Baptist Church

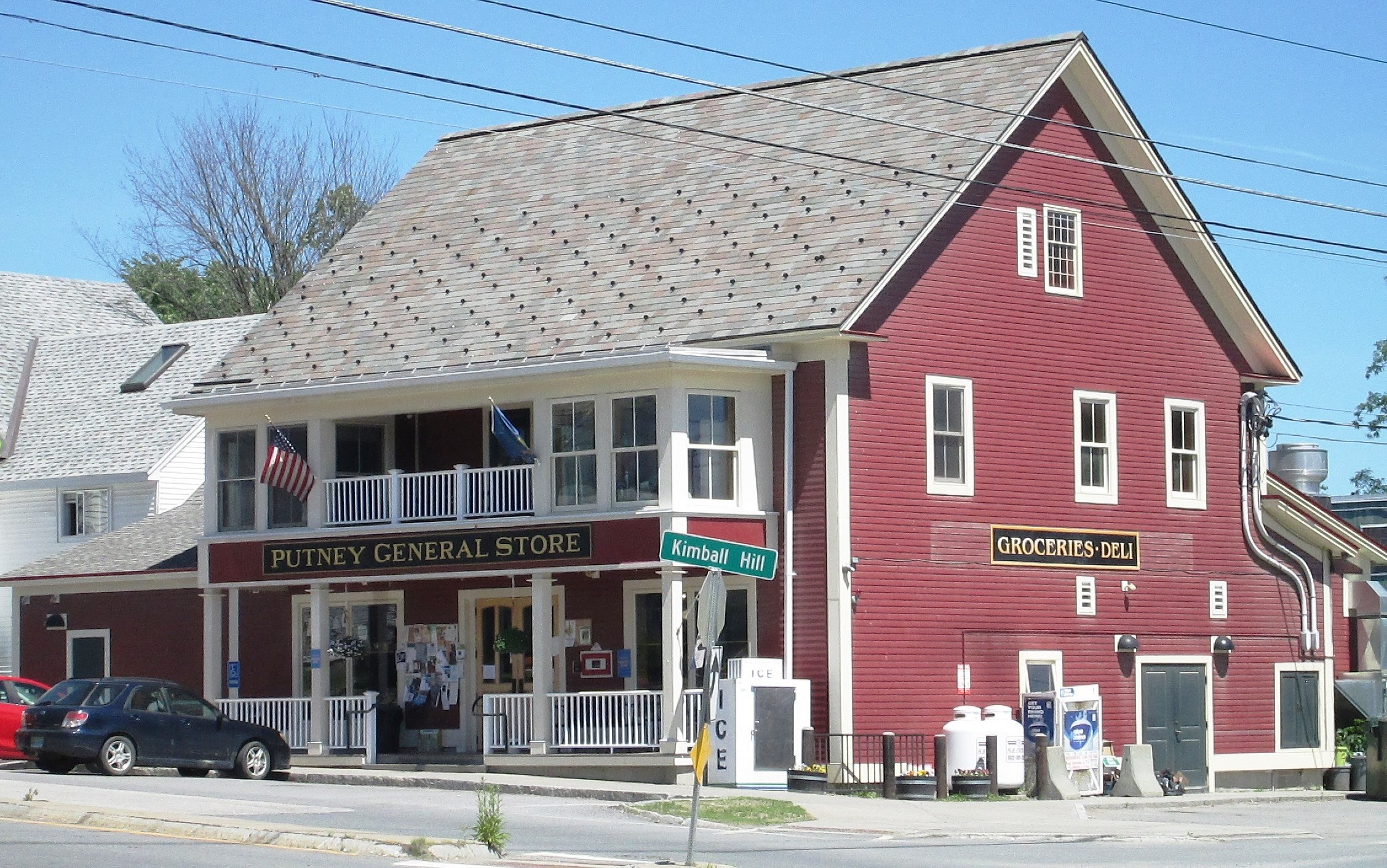
Putney General Store, built 1840–1900

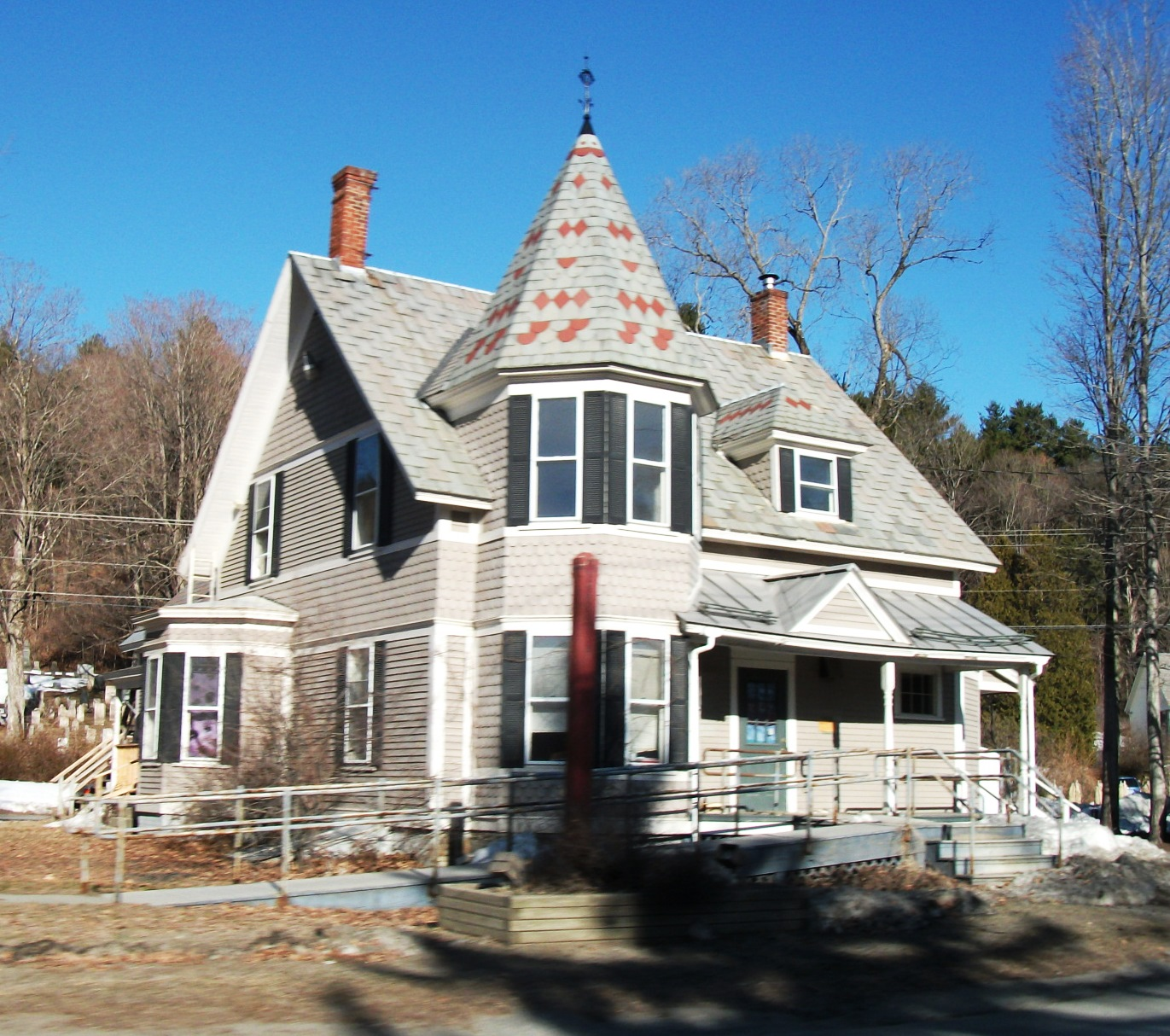
79 Main Street was built c. 1905

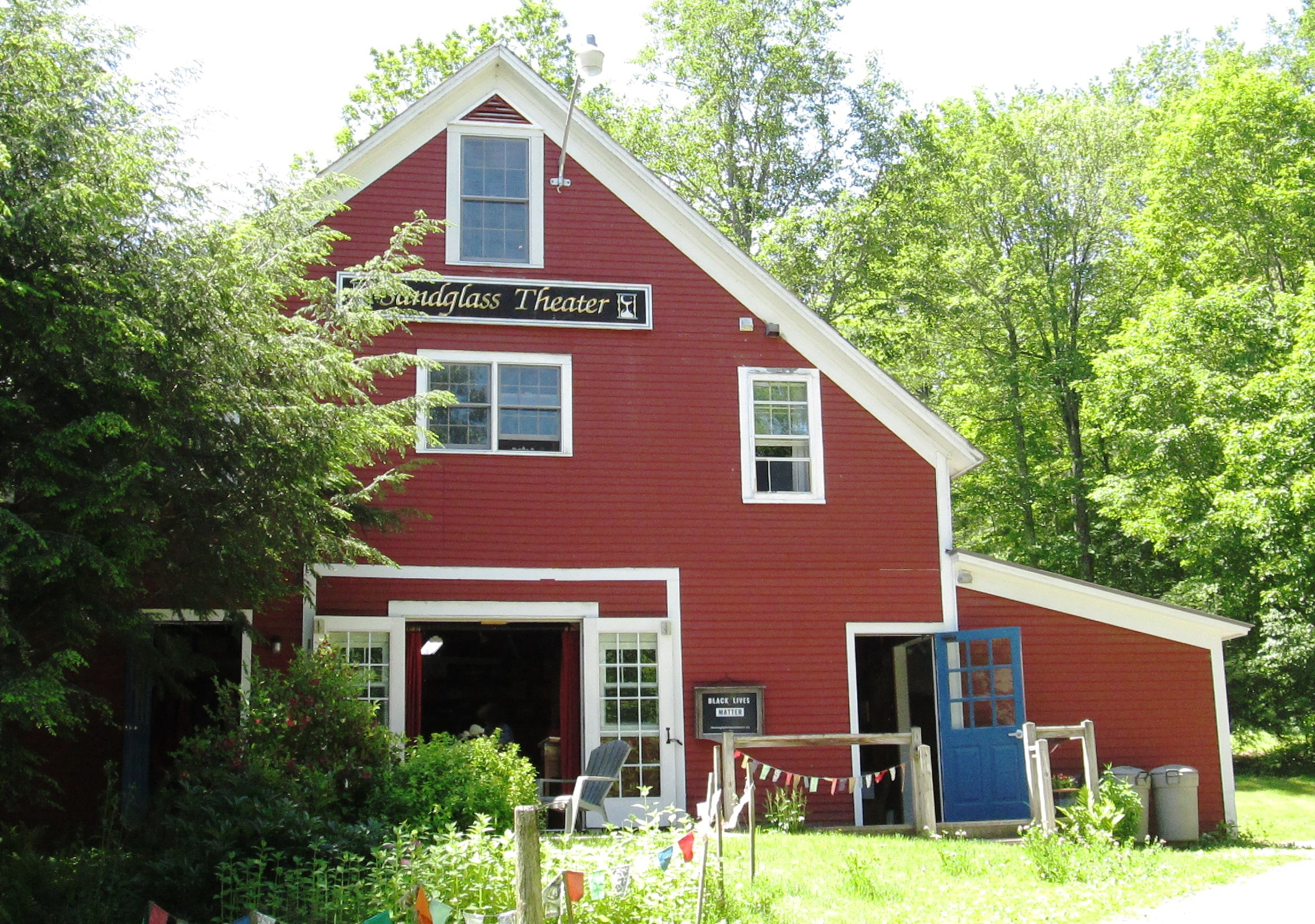
Sandglass Puppet Theater was built in 1915 as a livery stable

== See also ==
- National Register of Historic Places listings in Windham County, Vermont
