= Rudolph Boysen =

American horticulturist (1895–1950)

Charles Rudolph Boysen (July 14, 1895 – November 25, 1950) was an American horticulturist who created the boysenberry, a hybrid between several varieties of blackberries, raspberries, and loganberries.

== Boysenberry ==
Boysen had experimented with various berry crosses in Napa, California, during the 1920s. When Boysen first moved to Orange County, he brought berry vines with him which he planted on his in-law’s farm in Anaheim. Boysen worked as Anaheim City Parks superintendent from 1921 to 1950. In 1923, his hybrid grafted successfully and grew to bear fruit. Unable to make his new berry a commercial success, Boysen abandoned his crop after breaking his back in an accident. In 1927, he took specimens to Coolidge Rare Plant Nursery in Altadena.

Years later, a fellow grower named Walter Knott heard about the berry and tracked down Boysen. Knott was able to bring a few dying vines back to life at his farm, now known as Knott's Berry Farm in Buena Park, California. He named the fruit after Boysen.

== Biography ==
In 1930, Charles Rudolph Boysen was married to Margaret Bruton (1892–1970). They had a child, Robert Matt Boysen (1924–1980).

Boysen died at the age of 55, and is interred at the Melrose Abbey Cemetery in Anaheim.

== Legacy ==
Boysenberry Lane in Placentia, California, and Boysen Avenue in Anaheim, California, are both named for Rudolph Boysen. Boysen Park, a 24-acre (97,000 m^{2}) public park in Anaheim, was named in his honor. It features playgrounds, baseball diamonds, a large lawn, and a stucco-coated Grumman F9F-6P Cougar as a children's climbing toy. The Anaheim Tennis Center is located adjacent to Boysen Park, located at 951 S. State College Blvd. A garden of desert plants collected by Boysen during several trips to the deserts of southern California, Arizona, and Mexico are showcased at Pearson Park in Anaheim.
