= Walter Knott =

Knott's Berry Farm founder (1889–1981)

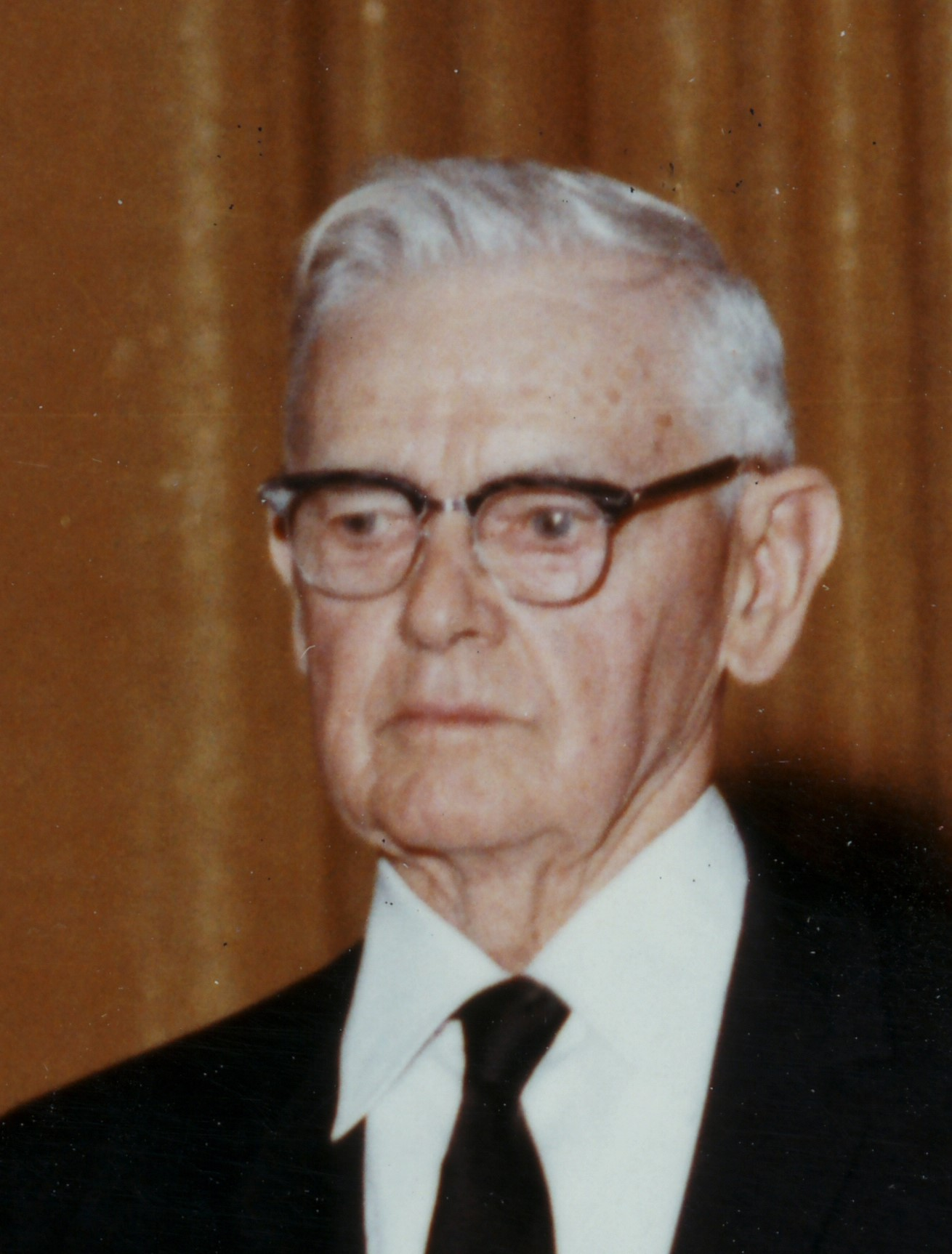
- Knott at his 60th anniversary in 1971
- Born: December 11, 1889; San Bernardino, California, U.S.
- Died: December 3, 1981 (aged 91); Buena Park, California, U.S.
- Resting place: Loma Vista Cemetery, Fullerton, California
- Occupations: Farmer, amusement park owner, businessman
- Years active: 1920–1974
- Known for: Founder of Knott's Berry Farm
- Spouse: Cordelia Hornaday (m. 1911; died 1974)
- Children: 4
- Parents: Elgin Charles Knott (father); Margaret Virginia Daugherty (mother)

Walter Marvin Knott (December 11, 1889 – December 3, 1981) was an American farmer and businessman who founded the Knott's Berry Farm amusement park in Buena Park, California, introduced and mass-marketed the boysenberry, and founded the Knott's Berry Farm food brand.

== Early life ==
Knott was born on December 11, 1889, in San Bernardino, California. His parents were Rev. Elgin Charles Knott, a Southern Methodist minister originally from Tennessee, and Margaret Virginia Daugherty Knott. Knott's father was a preacher at a church in Santa Ana, California, when he was born.

When Elgin died of tuberculosis in 1896, Margaret moved Walter and his brother to Pomona, California. Walter Knott had aspirations of being a farmer from a very young age, and ended his formal schooling at age 16 (which was legal in California at the time) in order to start working.

== Career ==
=== Early efforts ===
Knott was adept at growing produce, and would rent vacant lots around Pomona to grow produce to contribute to his family's income. At the time he married Cordelia Hornaday in 1911, Knott was working for a cement contractor.

In 1913, Knott homesteaded on 160 acres in the Mojave Desert near Newberry Springs and made his first effort at farming, which was unsuccessful. Knott tried farming again in 1917 near Shandon, California—growing produce to feed the employees of a cattle ranch and selling the excess supply for his own profit. This enterprise proved to be more successful, as Knott and Cordelia made enough money to pay off all his debts and had become a major supplier of produce for the area.

=== Arrival in Buena Park ===
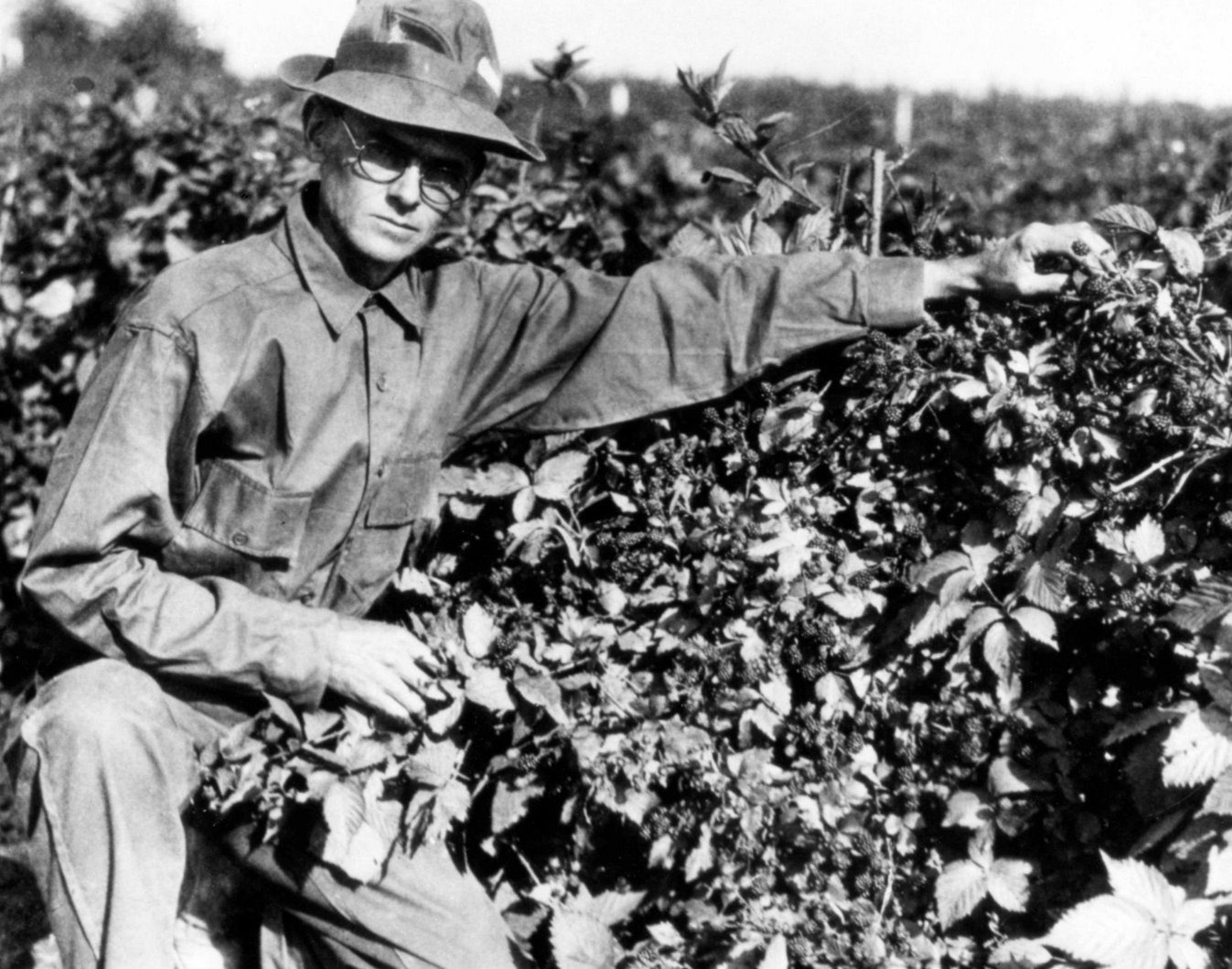
Walter Knott tending to his berry plants, 1948

In 1920, Knott went into a partnership with one of his cousins, berry grower Jim Preston, to farm 20 acres of land in Buena Park, California. In 1923, Knott set up a small berry stand on the property, facing Grand Avenue (later realigned as Beach Boulevard) to sell their produce to locals and tourists on their way to the beach. At the end of their original lease in 1927, Parsons decided to go off on his own and Knott purchased the Buena Park farm from his landlord, William H. Coughran.

The next year, in addition to a new house for his family, Knott built an 80-foot-long stucco building on the farm to house a new berry market, a nursery, and a tea room for Cordelia to sell hamburgers, sandwiches, and pies (Cordelia cooked the food in the Knott family kitchen). When the Great Depression began in 1929, Knott started buying parcels around the farm as the price of land dropped.

In 1934, Knott introduced the hybrid boysenberry, named after its creator, Rudolph Boysen. The previous year, Knott had secured cuttings from Boysen's dilapidated berry plant—which was a cross between a blackberry, red raspberry and loganberry—and planted and cultivated it at his own farm. The plant produced huge berries, and Knott integrated the boysenberry into all of his products as well as Cordelia's tea room menu.

The same year, Cordelia had an idea to serve fried chicken dinners at her tea room. The chicken was a huge hit and the tea room was expanded into a full restaurant over the next six years. Lines outside the restaurant were often several hours long.

=== Building an amusement park ===
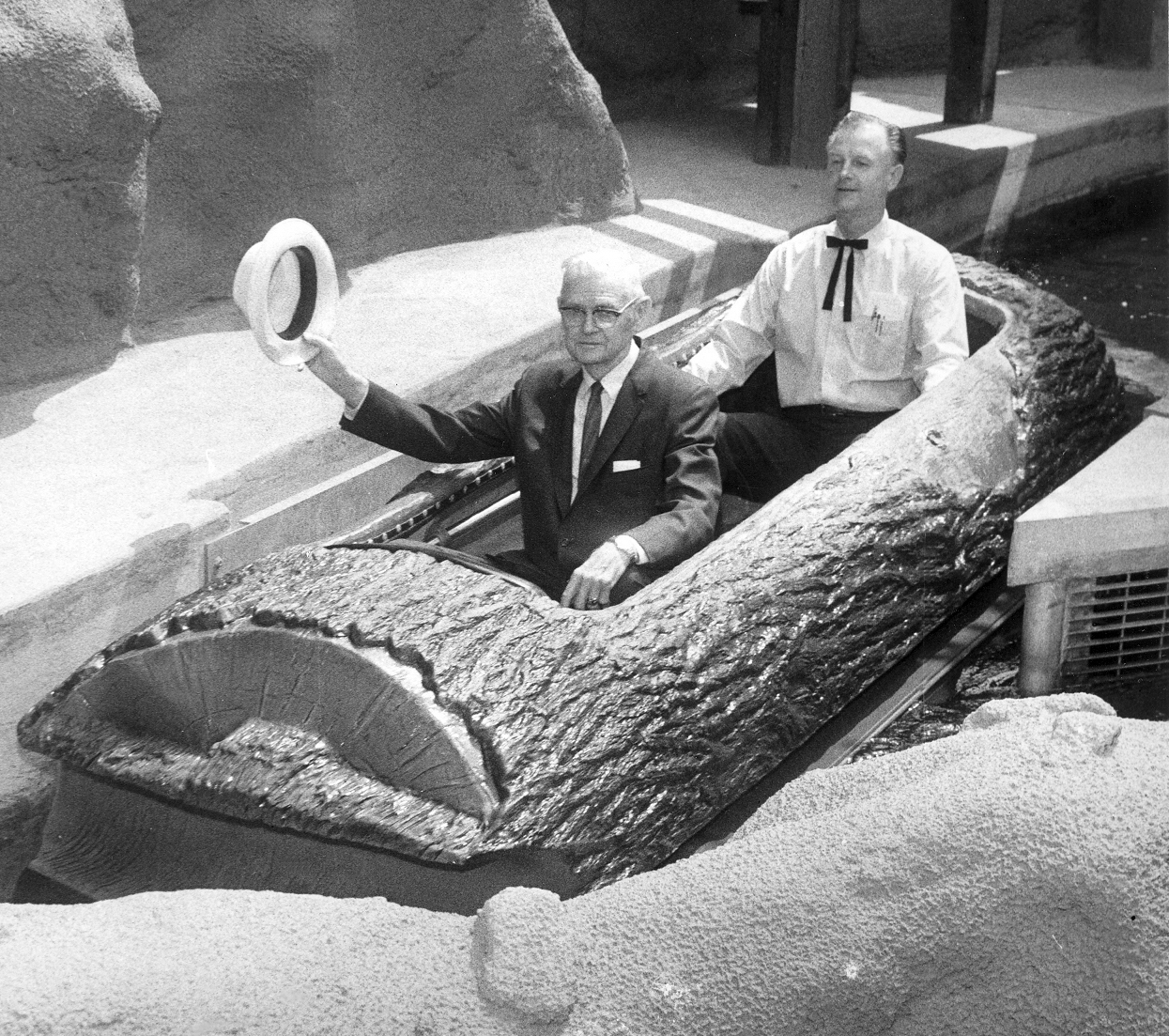
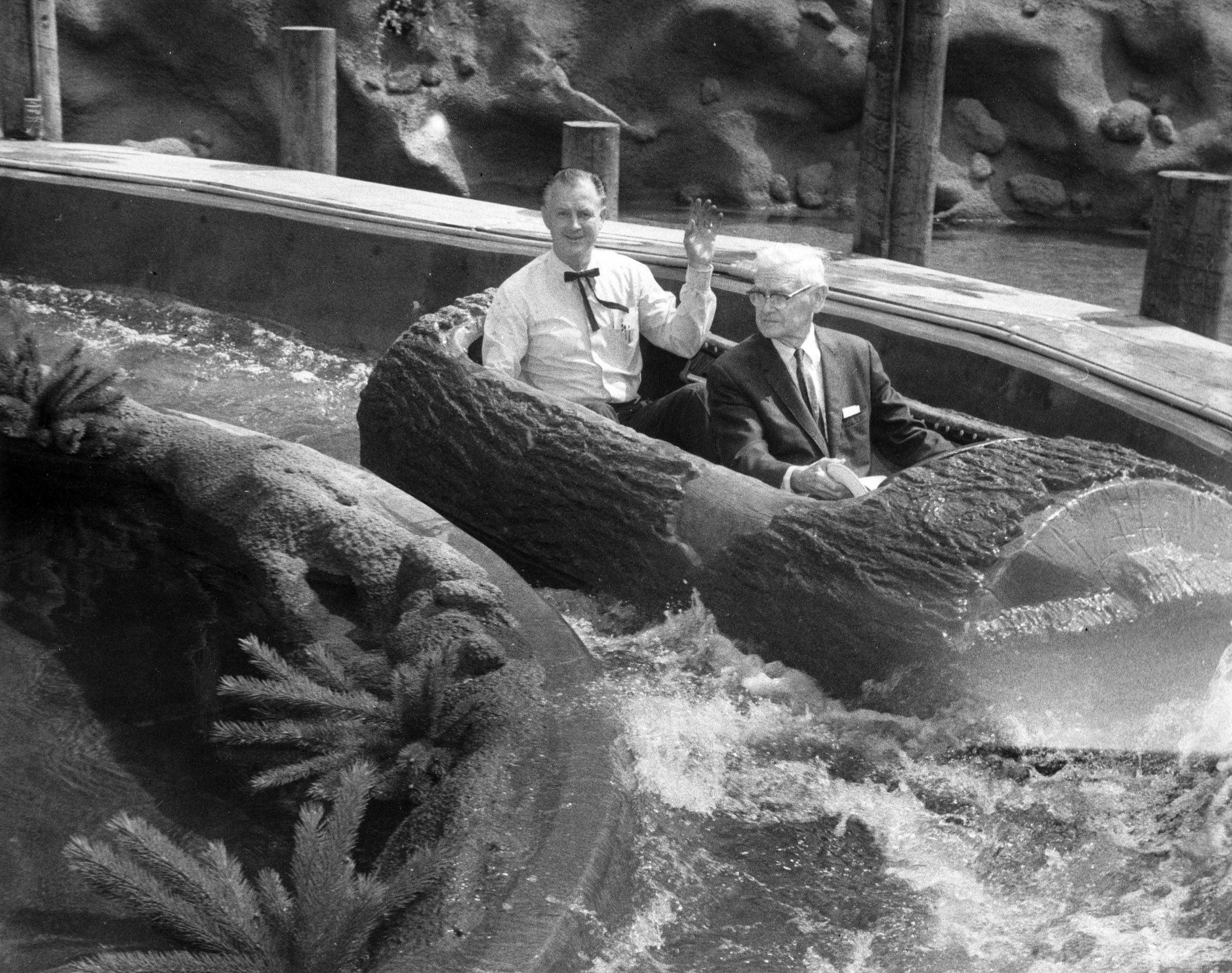
Walter Knott and Bud Hurlbut riding on the Timber Mountain Log Ride in 1969

To entertain the waiting chicken restaurant crowds, Knott built several roadside attractions, exhibits and shops, culminating in the building of a western ghost town on the property in 1940. Knott had an interest in American history, particularly the Old West, and purchased buildings from many old ghost towns around the west (California, Arizona, Nevada and other states). The buildings were dismantled, trucked down to Buena Park, and reassembled on the farm. Knott gradually added to the ghost town over the next few years—including a saloon show, melodrama theater, and a full-scale railroad.

Other attractions came in later years: a San Francisco cable car, a pan-for-gold experience, a stagecoach ride, the Calico Mine Train dark ride, the Timber Mountain Log Ride log flume ride, and a Mexican-themed area. In 1968, the Knott family fenced the farm, charged gate admission for the first time, and Knott's Berry Farm officially became an amusement park.

Even after Disneyland Park opened in 1955 only eight miles away in Anaheim, Knott's Berry Farm continued to thrive. Walt Disney and Walter Knott had a cordial relationship. Knott and Cordelia attended the opening of Disneyland in July 1955 and Walt Disney visited Knott's on several occasions both before and after Disneyland opened. The Knotts and the Disneys even dined at a local Chinese restaurant not far from Knott's Berry Farm. They were both members of the original planning council for Children's Hospital of Orange County.

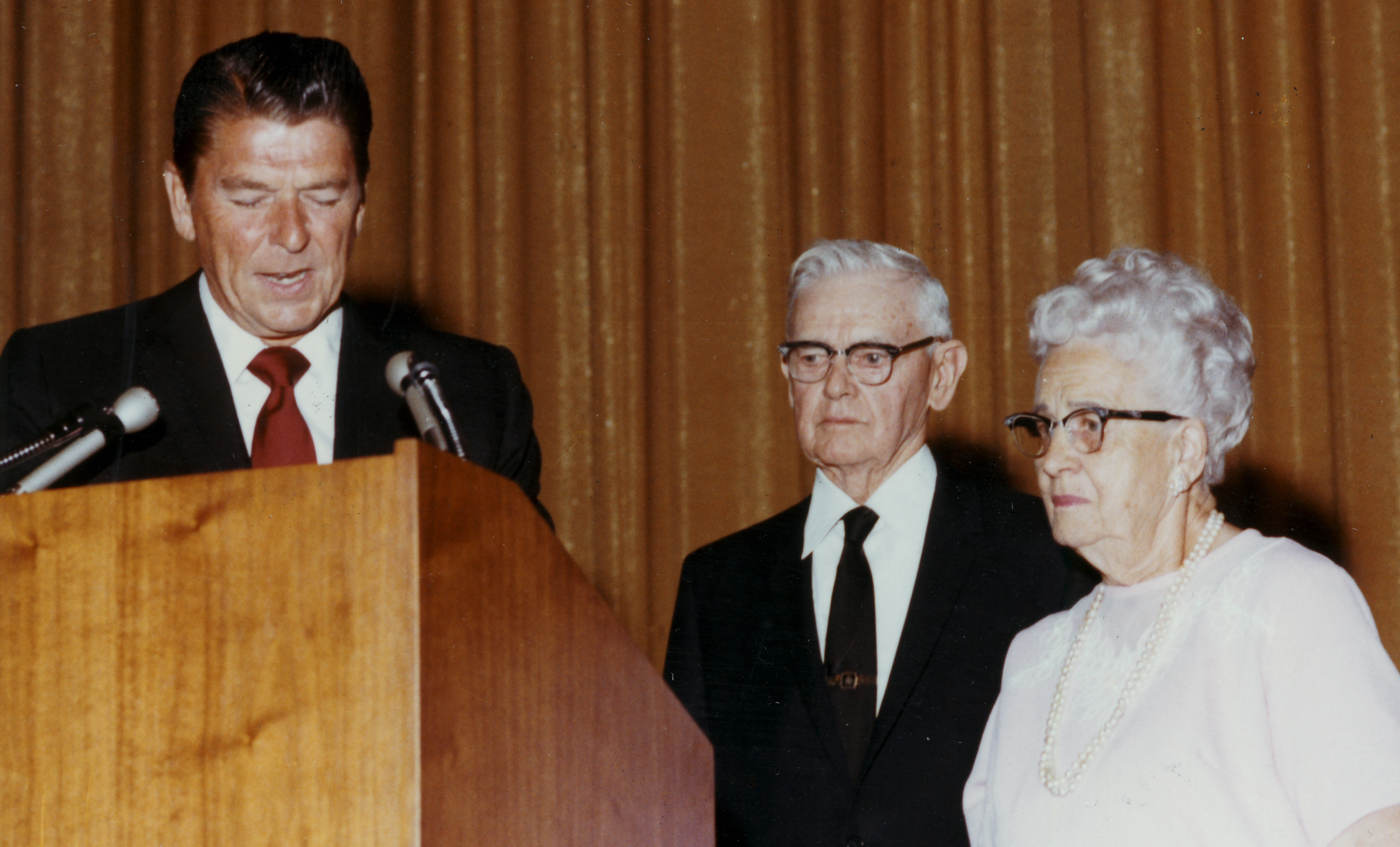
Ronald Reagan speaking at the Knotts' 60th wedding anniversary in 1971

=== Semi-retirement ===
Walter Knott remained active in the operation of Knott's Berry Farm until Cordelia's death in 1974, at which point he left day-to-day park operations to his children and focused on political causes.

== Death and legacy ==
On December 3, 1981, just eight days shy of his 92nd birthday, Walter Knott died from complications of Parkinson's disease at his home in Buena Park, California. Knott is buried at Loma Vista Memorial Park in Fullerton, California.

Knott's Berry Farm continues to operate year-round today. The Knott family remained owners of Knott's Berry Farm until 1997, when the park was sold to Cedar Fair Entertainment Company (now Six Flags Entertainment Corporation) for $300 million.

The J.M. Smucker Co. owns the "Knott's Berry Farm" brand of jams, jellies, and snack foods—which Smucker purchased from ConAgra Foods in 2008. Smucker discontinued selling Knott's branded products in 2024.

== Personal life ==
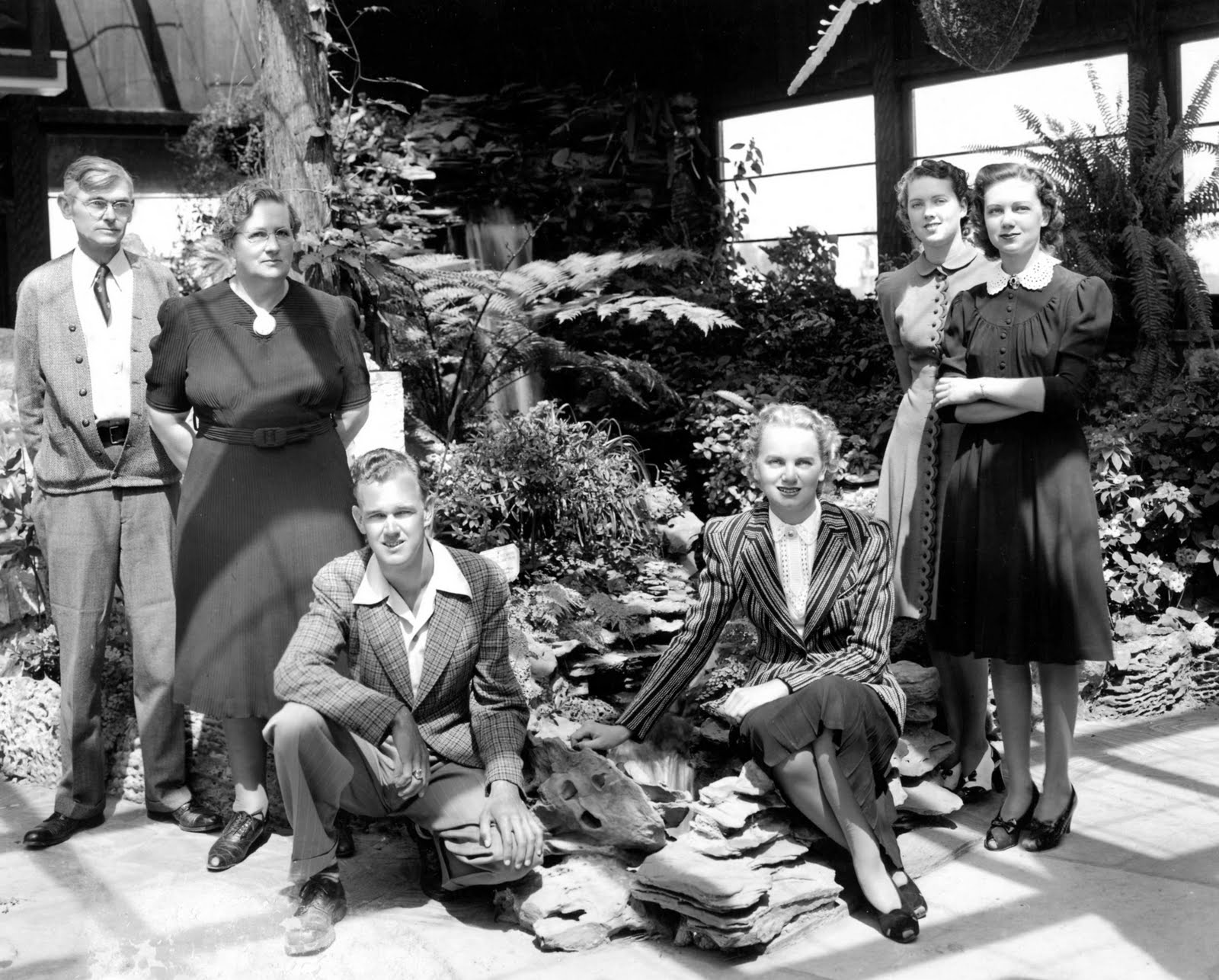
Walter and Cordelia Knott with their four children at Knott's Berry Farm

Walter Knott married his high school sweetheart, Cordelia Hornaday, on June 3, 1911. They had four children: Virginia, Russell, Rachel, and Marion.

After leaving his business operations to his children following the death of his wife on April 12, 1974, Knott focused his attention on conservative politics. Knott was active in a variety of conservative causes, including founding the California Free Enterprise Assistance and endowing various private schools and colleges. He campaigned for Republican politicians like Richard Nixon and Ronald Reagan. Knott also financed the Orange County chapter of the John Birch Society.

Through his time as a struggling farmer and businessman during the Great Depression, Knott became a firm believer in rugged individualism—that anyone could be successful through hard work, and any form of government intervention was wrong. Critics say this 'Old West' theme of his amusement park was a romantic and one-sided reflection of his beliefs.

Because of his interest in American pioneer history, Knott purchased and restored the real silver mining ghost town of Calico, California in 1951. As a child, Knott spent a lot of time in Calico living with his uncle. During World War I, he helped to build a silver mill in Calico. In 1966, he deeded Calico to San Bernardino County, California.

Knott appeared on the December 23, 1954, episode of You Bet Your Life, hosted by Groucho Marx.
