= Rubus fruticosus =

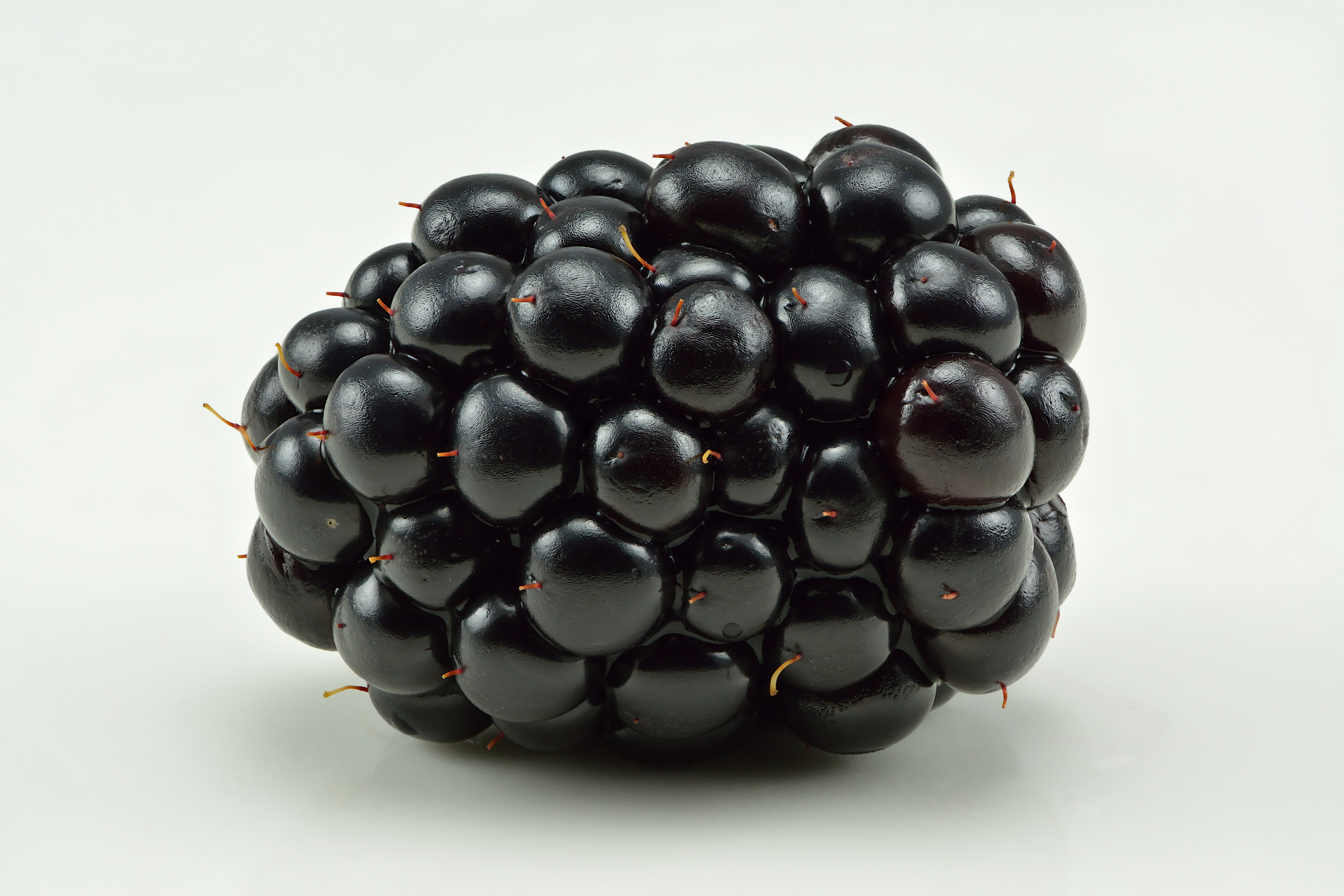
Blackberry

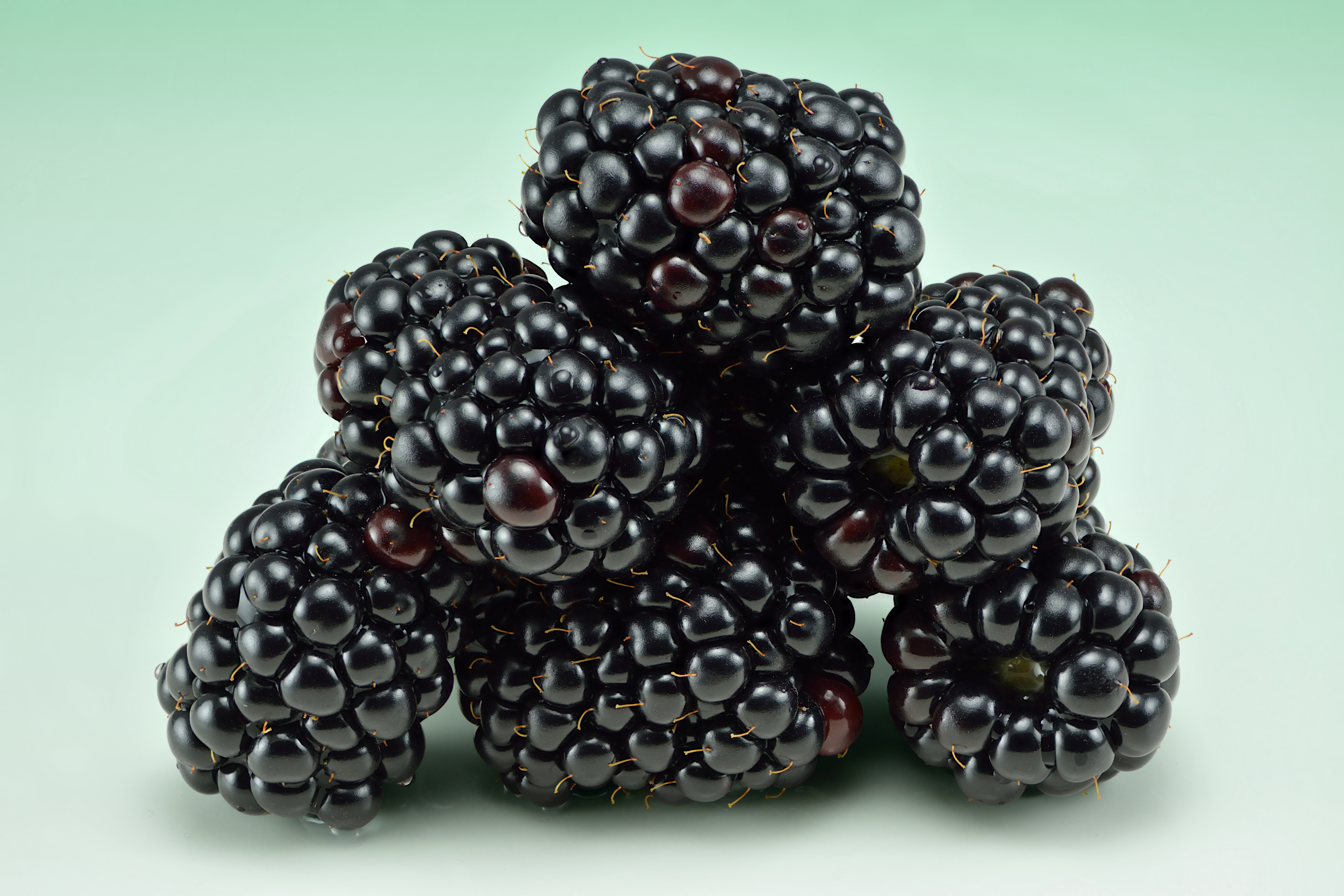
Blackberries

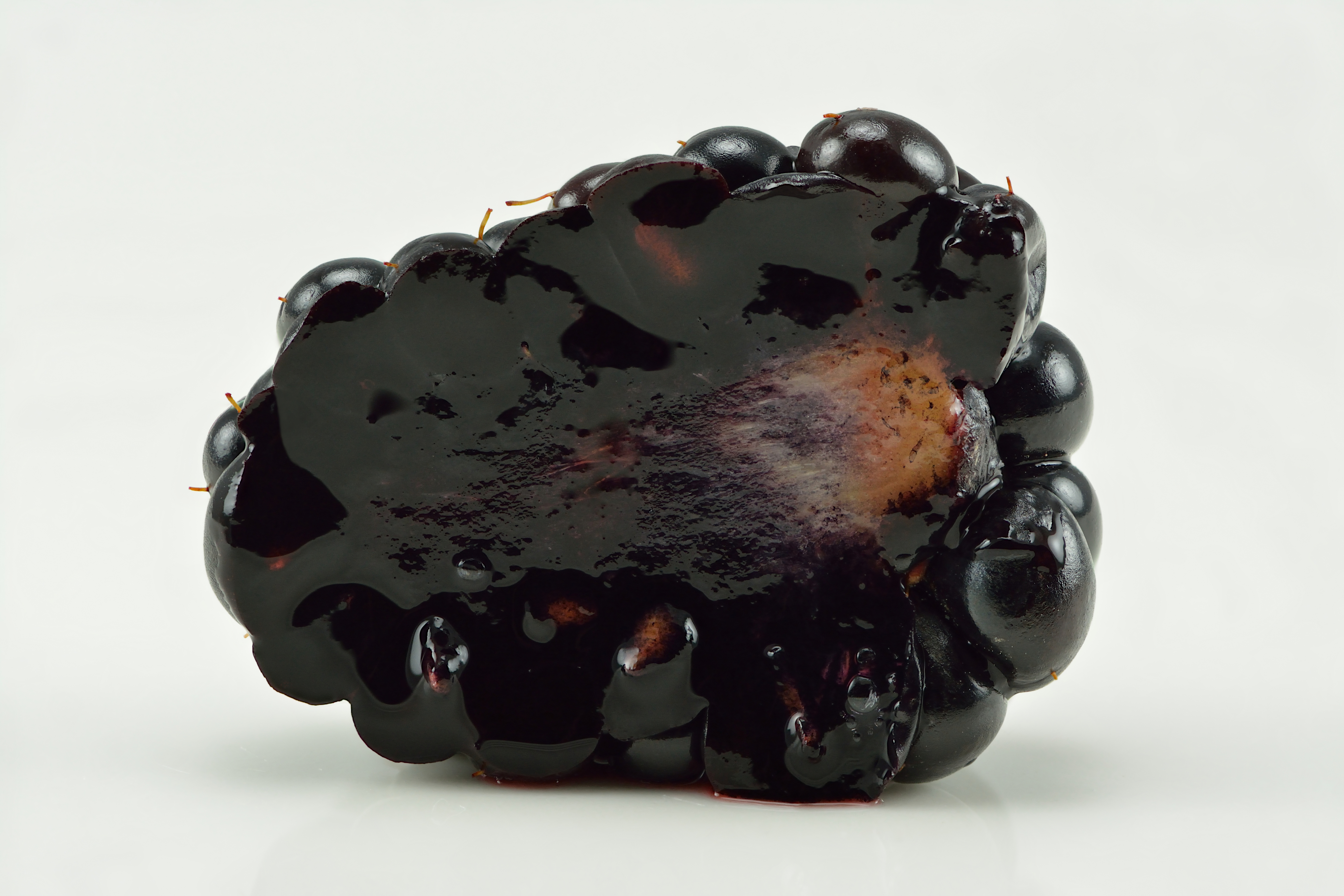
Halved blackberry

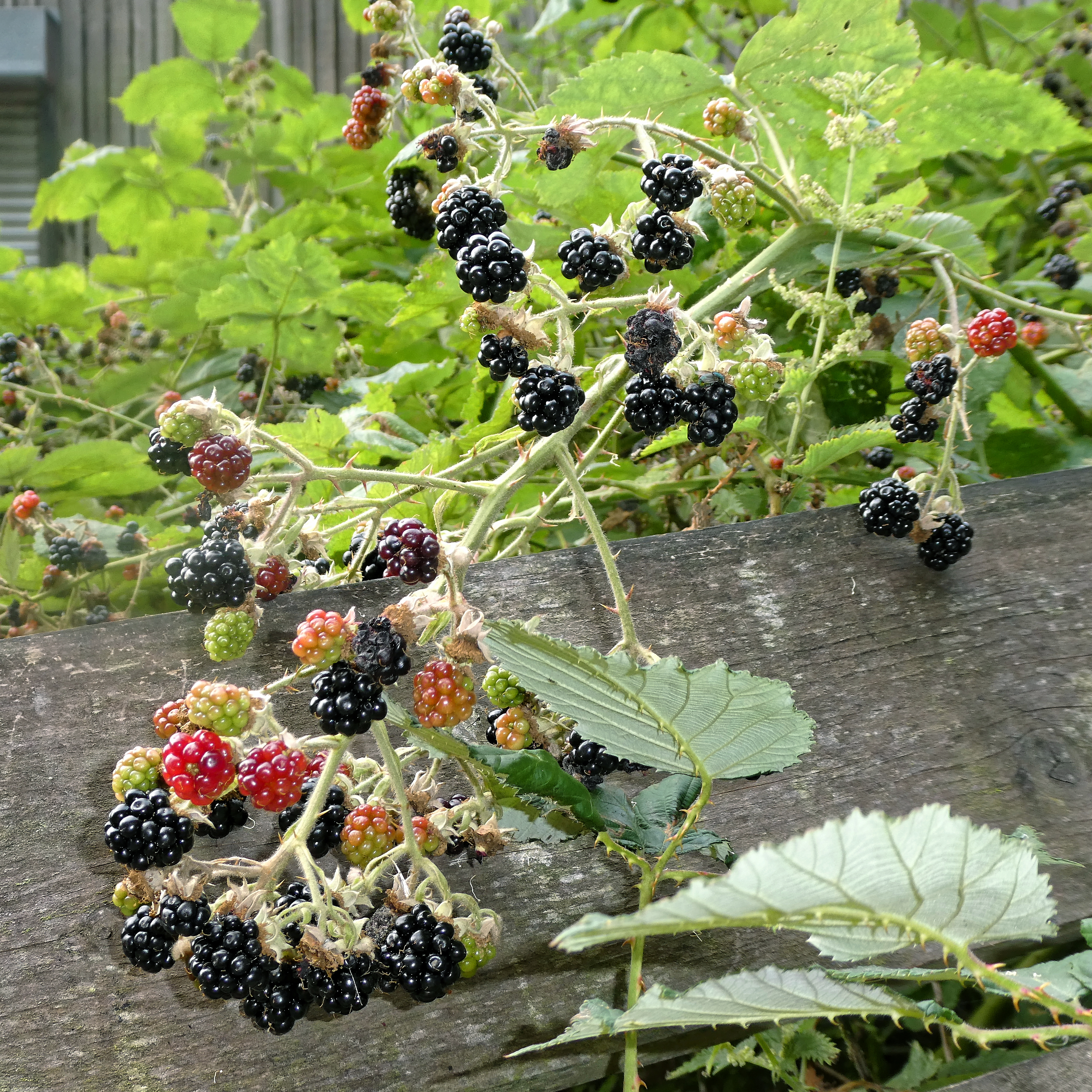
Plant with ripe berries

Rubus fruticosus L. is the ambiguous name of a European blackberry species in the genus Rubus (part of the rose family). The name has been interpreted in several ways:

- The species represented by the type specimen of Rubus fruticosus L., which is also the type specimen of the genus Rubus. This specimen is considered to match the species R. plicatus, in Rubus subgenus Rubus, section Rubus.
- Various species consistent with Carl Linnaeus' original description of the species, which was based on a mixture of specimens now considered to match Rubus ulmifolius and R. plicatus
- a species aggregate (group of similar species) Rubus fruticosus agg. (a nomen ambiguum) that includes most (or rarely all) of a group called Rubus subgenus Rubus (or less often: Rubus section Rubus [sensu latissimo]):
  - in a narrow sense, sometimes separated as the section Glandulosus (alternative name: subsection Hiemales) In this sense the species aggregate does not include the type of the genus Rubus.
  - in a broad sense: (1) (i) sections Glandulosus and Rubus [sensu stricto] (in non-British systems, these two sections are classified together as section Rubus [sensu lato], section Glandulosus being called subsection Hiemales and section Rubus [sensu stricto] being called subsection Rubus) or (ii) "most of" these sections; or (2) sections Glandulosus, Rubus [sensu stricto] and Corylifolii. Section Rubus [sensu stricto] are probably hybrids involving members of section Glandulosus with either R. idaeus or R. allegheniensis. Section Corylifolii are probably hybrids involving members of section Glandulosus with R. caesius.
  - even more broadly, including all the taxa in the subgenus Rubus

== Incorrect applications ==
Apart from the established meaning of Rubus fruticosus L. as R. plicatus, the name R. fruticosus has been incorrectly applied to several species, including:

- Rubus fructicosus Weihe & Nees, Rubi Germ. 24, 1822 -> Rubus montanus Lib. ex Lej., Fl. Spa 2: 317, 1813 (or part of R. montanus)
- Rubus fruticosus G.N.Jones -> Rubus vestitus Weihe
- Rubus fruticosus L. ex Dierb. -> Rubus vulgaris Weihe & Nees
- Rubus fruticosus Lour. -> Rubus cochinchinensis Tratt.
