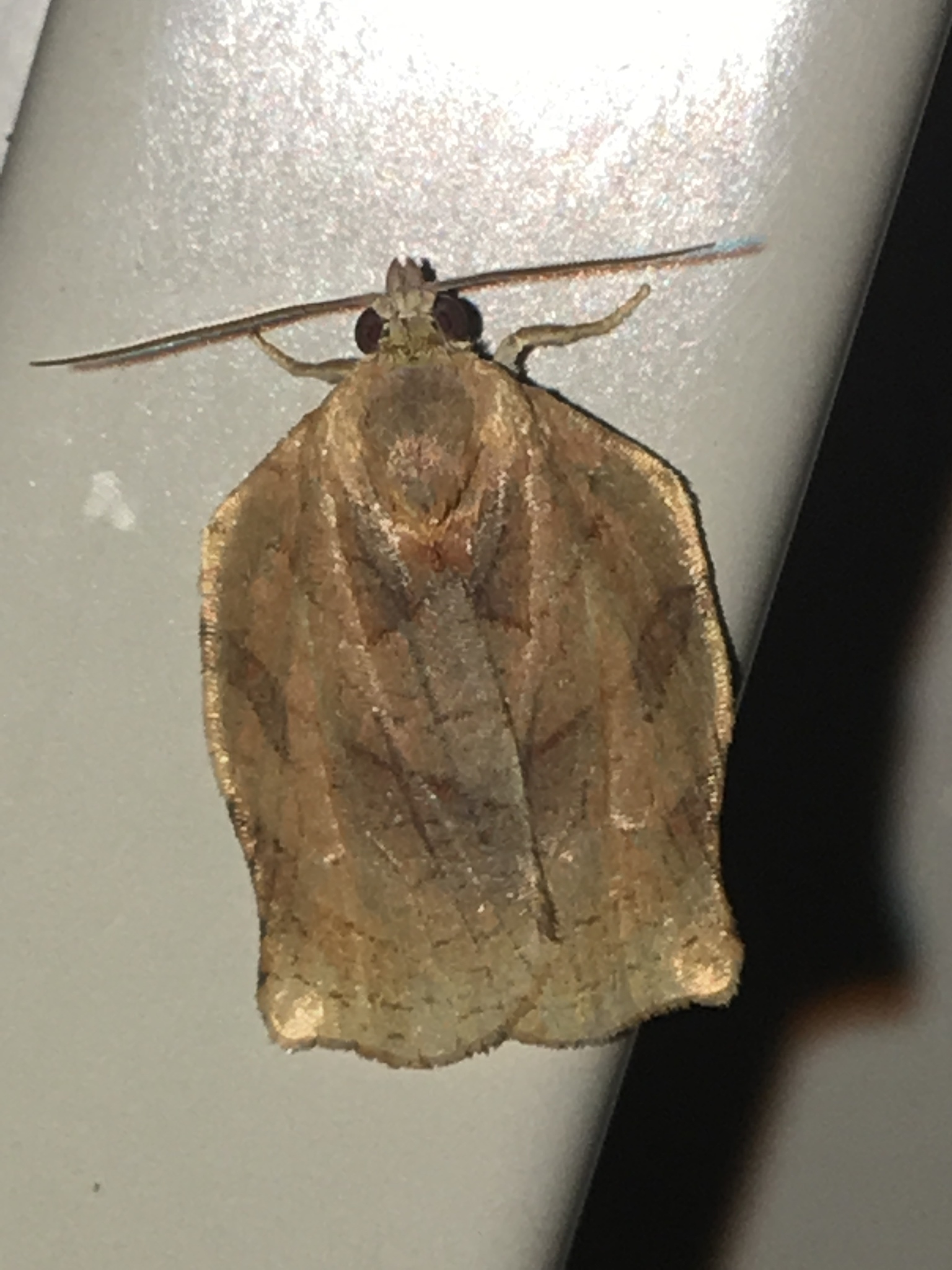

Scientific classification
- Kingdom: Animalia
- Phylum: Arthropoda
- Clade: Pancrustacea
- Class: Insecta
- Order: Lepidoptera
- Family: Tortricidae
- Genus: Archips
- Species: A. purpuranus

Binomial name
- Archips purpuranus (Clemens, 1865)

Synonyms
- Loxotaenia purpurana Clemens, 1865; Archips purpurana; Tortrix gurgitana Robinson, 1869; Cacoecia guritana Darlington, 1947; Tortrix lintneriana Grote, 1873

= Archips purpuranus =

Species of moth

Archips purpuranus, the omnivorous leafroller moth, is a species of moth of the family Tortricidae. It is found in most of eastern North America.

The length of the forewings is 8.5–11 mm for males and 10.5–12.5 mm for females. Adults are on wing from June to July in one generation per year in most of the range.

The larvae are polyphagous and have been recorded feeding on the foliage of a large range of plants, including Rhus, Erigeron annuus, Solidago, Betula (including Betula papyrifera and Betula populifolia), Viburnum, Cornus canadensis, Sedum, Sempervivum, Vaccinium, Lupinus, Quercus macrocarpa, Geranium, Ribes, Sassafras, Maianthemum racemosum, Fraxinus, Fragaria, Malus, Prunus (including Prunus pensylvanica and Prunus virginiana), Rubus (including Rubus plicatus), Spiraea, Populus tremuloides, Salix, Mandragora, Tilia americana and Viola species. They reach a length of 20–30 mm when full grown.
