= Rubus violaceifrons =

Scientific classification
- Kingdom: Plantae
- Clade: Embryophytes
- Clade: Tracheophytes
- Clade: Spermatophytes
- Clade: Angiosperms
- Clade: Eudicots
- Clade: Rosids
- Order: Rosales
- Family: Rosaceae
- Genus: Rubus
- Species: R. violaceifrons

Binomial name
- Rubus violaceifrons P. Havlíček, Trávn. & Velebi 2022

Species of flowering plant

Rubus violaceifrons is a tetraploid species of bramble in the subgenus Rubus. It has densely haired leaves and white flowers with bright red-purple styles. The canes are purple-spotted in the shade and brown-red in sunny areas. It is possibly endemic to Bohemia, where it grows in forest margins and clearings.
