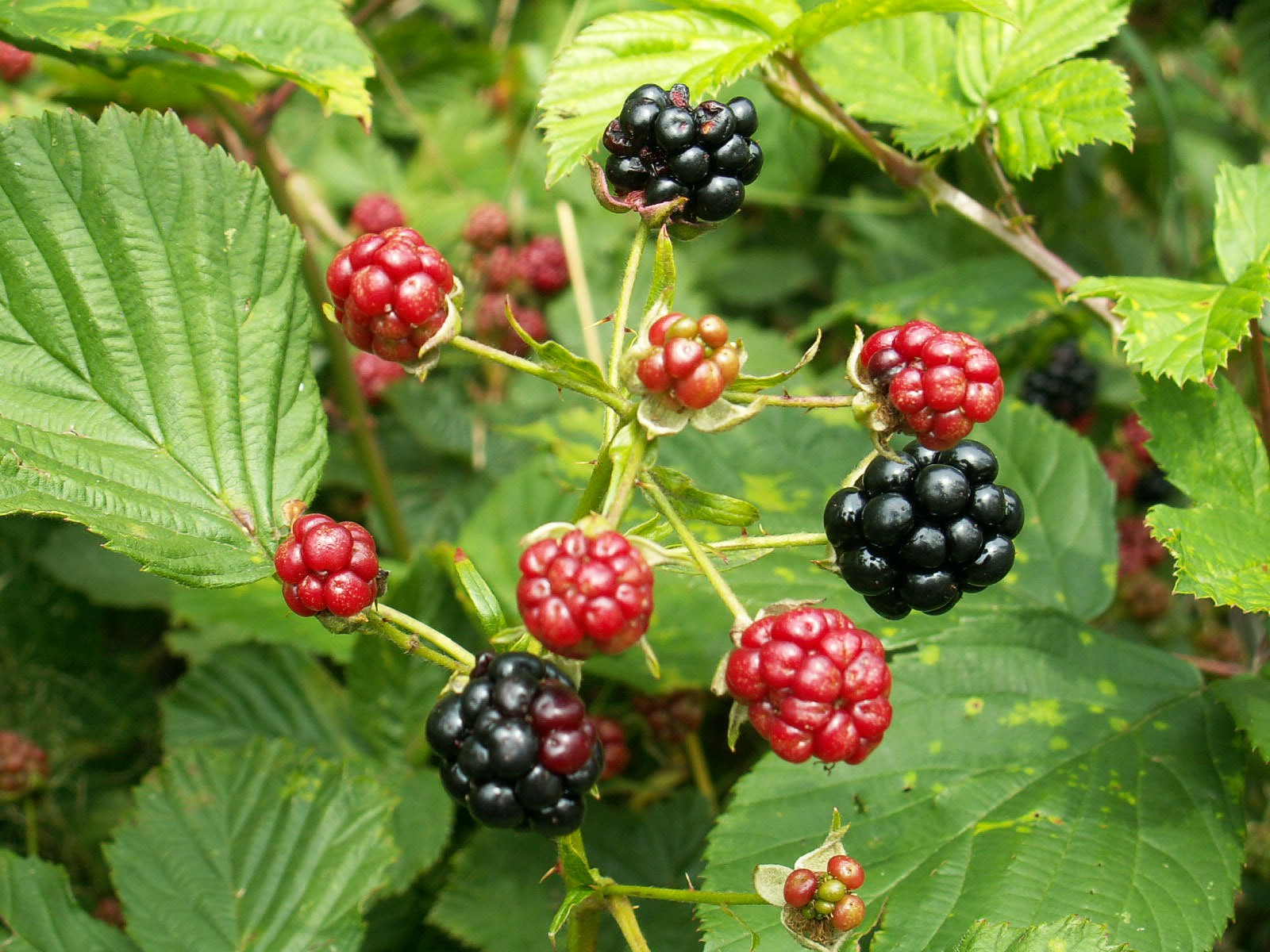

Scientific classification
- Kingdom: Plantae
- Clade: Tracheophytes
- Clade: Angiosperms
- Clade: Eudicots
- Clade: Rosids
- Order: Rosales
- Family: Rosaceae
- Genus: Rubus
- Subgenus: Rubus subg. Rubus
- Species: R. plicatus

Binomial name
- Rubus plicatus Weihe & Nees

Synonyms
- Rubus aestivalis E.H.L.Krause; Rubus affinis Weihe & Nees, p.p.676; Rubus avellanifolius Köhler ex Weihe; Rubus corylifolius Hayne; Rubus ernestibolli E.H.L.Krause; Rubus exaltatus Dumort.; Rubus fruticosus L. sens.str.; Rubus holmiensis Gand.; Rubus longipetiolatus Hülsen; Rubus polymorphus K.F.Schimp. & Spenn.; Rubus rosulentus P.J.Müll.; Rubus spicifolius Boulay; Rubus teutobergensis G.H.Loos

= Rubus plicatus =

Berry and plant

Rubus plicatus is a species of blackberry native to Europe.

== Taxonomy ==
The type specimen of the genus Rubus was selected from among Linnaeus's specimens by Nathaniel Lord Britton and Addison Brown in 1913 as a herbarium specimen labelled Rubus fruticosus. This specimen turned out to include a mixture of pieces that apparently belong to Rubus plicatus and Rubus ulmifolius. From these, a component that appears to match Rubus plicatus was selected to be the type. The type of Rubus plicatus, however, is a different specimen (which permits an individual botanist to decide that R. plicatus and R. fruticosus are not the same species). Whenever R. fruticosus and R. plicatus are considered to belong to the same species, the name Rubus fruticosus has priority. When one must be listed as a synonym of the other, R. fruticosus is usually considered to be a synonym of the later name Rubus plicatus, although strictly speaking that choice is contrary to the International Code of Nomenclature for algae, fungi, and plants.
