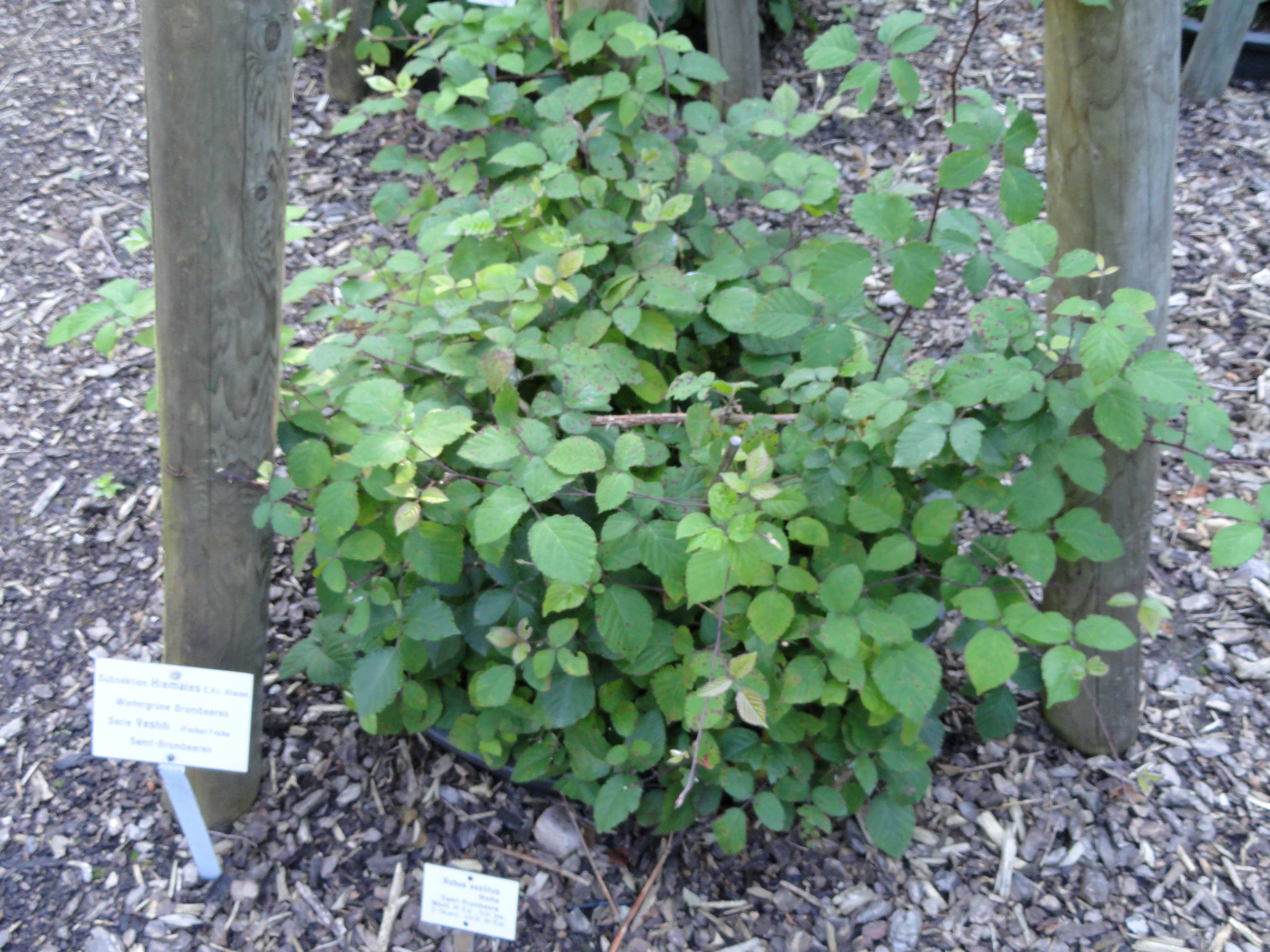

Scientific classification
- Kingdom: Plantae
- Clade: Embryophytes
- Clade: Tracheophytes
- Clade: Spermatophytes
- Clade: Angiosperms
- Clade: Eudicots
- Clade: Rosids
- Order: Rosales
- Family: Rosaceae
- Genus: Rubus
- Species: R. vestitus

Binomial name
- Rubus vestitus Weihe & Nees 1825 not Hegetschw. 1839 nor Wirtg. 1856 nor Holuby ex Focke 1877

Synonyms
- Synonymy: Rubus debilitatus A.Först.; Rubus diversifolius Lindl.; Rubus fruticosus G.N.Jones; Rubus hirsutus Weihe ex Steud.; Rubus lanatus Focke; Rubus leucanthemus P.J.Müll.; Rubus vinetorum Holandre

= Rubus vestitus =

Berry and plant

Rubus vestitus is a European species of bramble, called European blackberry in the United States.

== Description ==
It forms a spiny shrub sometimes as much as 2 metres (6 1/2 feet) tall. The leaves are palmately compound with 3 or 5 leaflets, each leaflet wide, almost round, with a pointed tip and teeth along the edges. The flowers are pink or magenta. The fruits are very dark, nearly black.

== Distribution and habitat ==
The species is native to Europe and is naturalized along the northern Pacific coast of Canada and the United States (British Columbia, Washington, and Oregon). It is one of the most common species of bramble in the British Isles, found in most vice-counties, apart from the far north. Its preference for neutral to slightly alkaline soils places it among a minority of European Rubus species.
