= Kotataberry =

Blackberry cultivar

- Genus: Rubus
- Hybrid parentage: OSC 743 ['Pacific' × 'Boysen'] × OSC 877 ['Jenner' × 'Eldorado']
- Cultivar: 'Kotata'
- Origin: Corvallis, Oregon, United States 1984

'Kotata' is a blackberry cultivar with a diverse ancestry in a few Rubus species including western and eastern North American blackberry species and red raspberry. 'Kotata' was developed by the United States Department of Agriculture Agricultural Research Service in Corvallis, Oregon, United States in their cooperative breeding program with Oregon State University. In 1984, 'Kotata' was released as a potential replacement for the 'Marion' blackberry, with better cold tolerance and fruit firmness. However, while the taste of the 'Kotata' is unique and invariably good, it did not replace 'Marion' but was used as a slightly earlier complement to 'Marion'. 'Kotata' was selected from a cross of the two parents OSC 743 ['Pacific' × 'Boysen'] × OSC 877 ['Jenner' × 'Eldorado']. The pedigree of 'Kotata' has boysenberry, wild Pacific Northwest blackberries, an Eastern U.S. blackberry species and loganberry in its background. While it was released as a cultivar in 1984, it was first selected as OSC 1050 in 1951 and was grown commercially under that name. 'Kotata' has been grown primarily in the Pacific Northwest region of North America and in the United Kingdom.

== Description ==
Kotataberries are black, longish, and have a "glossy skin that dulls as it ripens."

== Data ==
- Color: Deep black
- Season: July 1 - July 24 in Oregon, USA
- Seed size: Medium
- Size: 6g to 7g
