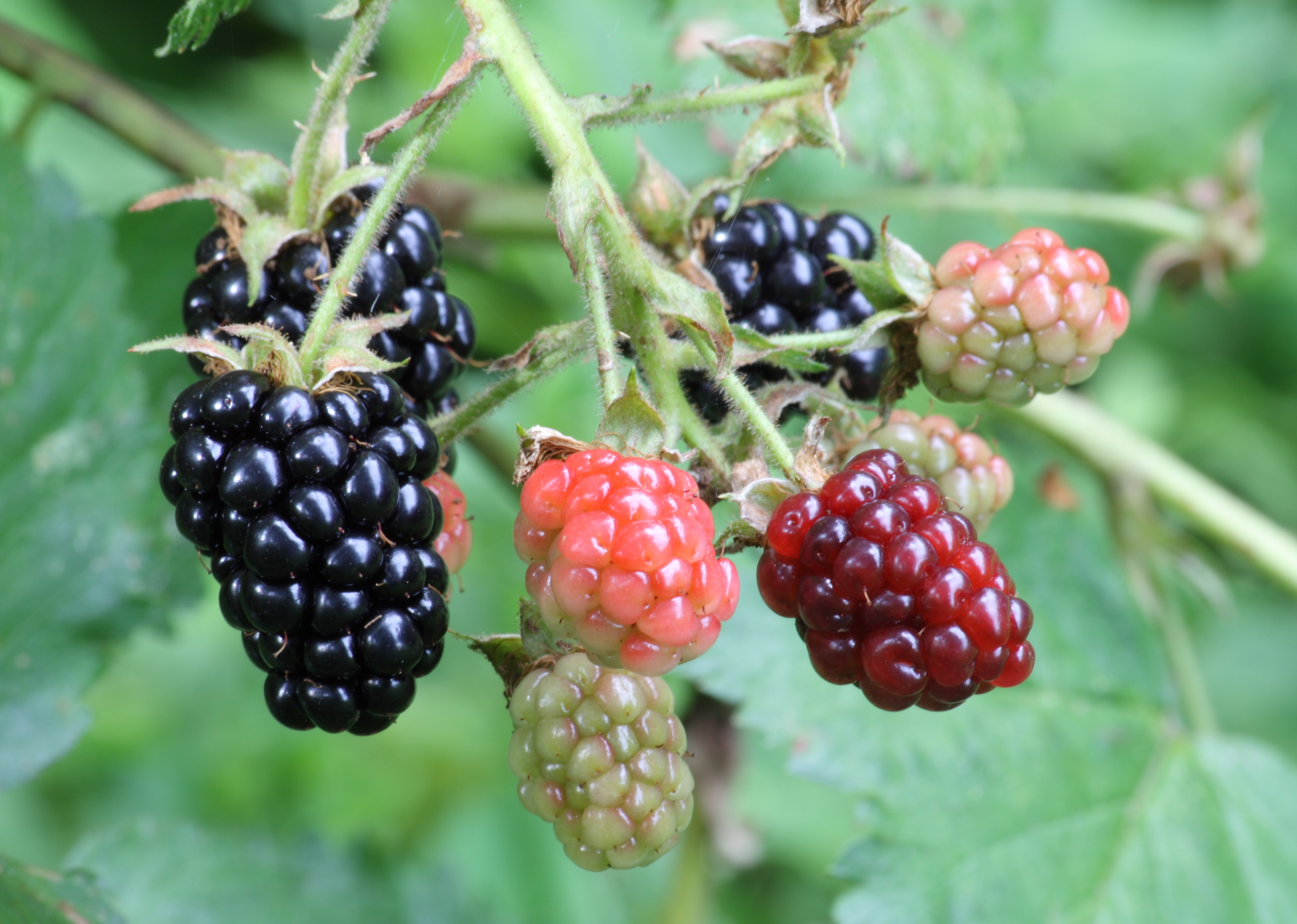
- Ripe, ripening, and unripe Allegheny blackberries (Rubus allegheniensis)
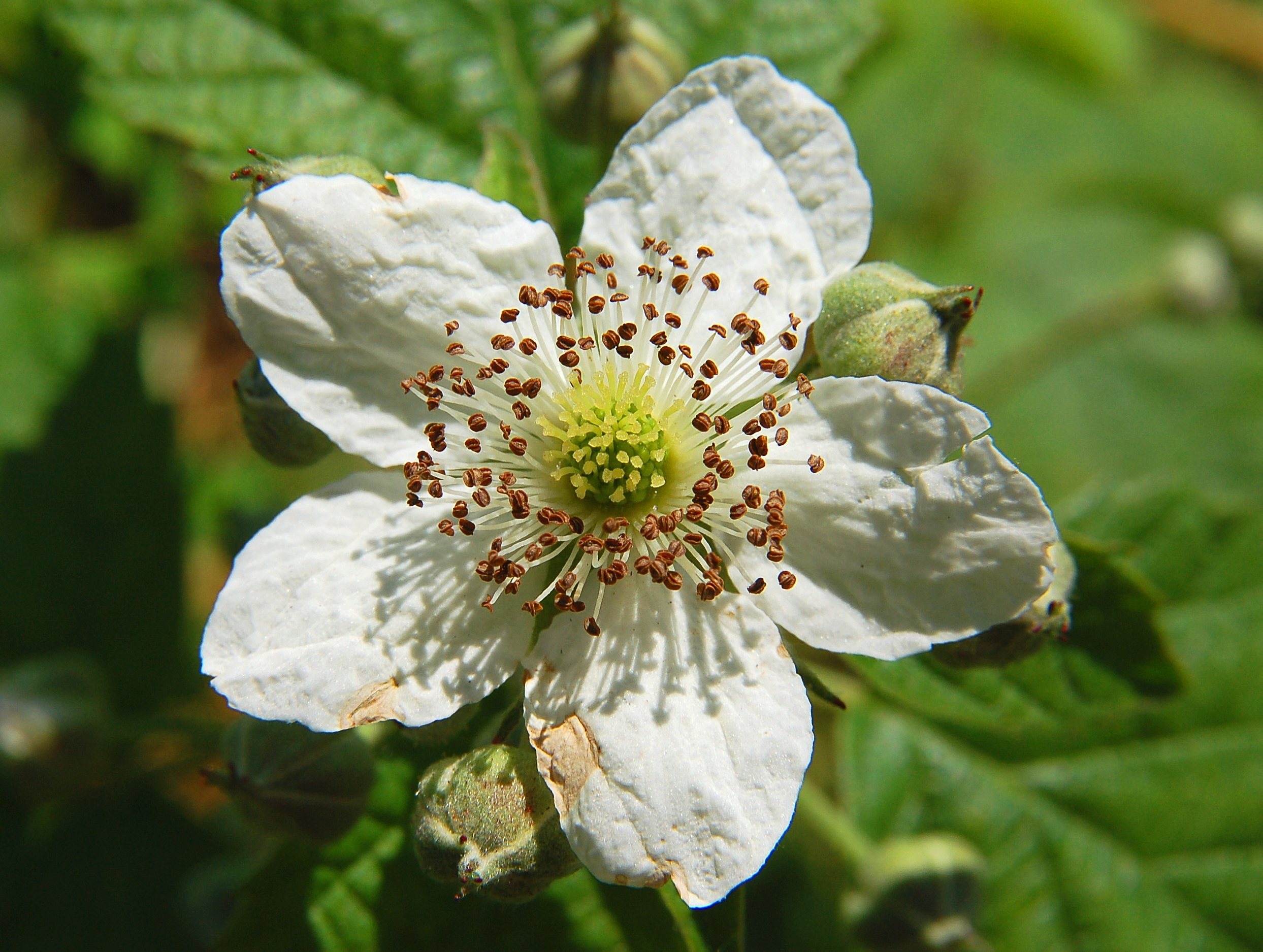
- Blackberry flower, Rubus fruticosus species aggregate

Scientific classification
- Kingdom: Plantae
- Clade: Tracheophytes
- Clade: Angiosperms
- Clade: Eudicots
- Clade: Rosids
- Order: Rosales
- Family: Rosaceae
- Genus: Rubus
- Subgenus: Rubus subg. Rubus

Species
- Rubus ursinus; Rubus laciniatus— Evergreen blackberry; Rubus argutus; Rubus armeniacus— Himalayan blackberry; Rubus plicatus; Rubus ulmifolius; Rubus allegheniensis; Rubus violaceifrons; And hundreds more microspecies (the subgenus also includes the dewberries)

Synonyms
- Rubus subg. Eubatus

= Blackberry =

Fruit of Rubus species

A blackberry is an edible fruit produced by many species in the genus Rubus in the family Rosaceae, hybrids among these species within the subgenus Rubus, and hybrids between the subgenera Rubus and Idaeobatus. The taxonomy of blackberries has historically been confused because of hybridization and apomixis so that species have often been grouped together and called species aggregates.

Blackberry fruit production is abundant with annual volumes of 20,000 pounds (9,100 kg) per 1 acre (0.40 ha) possible, making this plant commercially attractive.

Rubus armeniacus (Himalayan or Armenian blackberry) is considered a noxious weed and invasive species in many regions of the Pacific Northwest of Canada and the United States, where it grows out of control in urban and suburban parks and woodlands.

== Description ==
The blackberry looks similar to its raspberry relatives. What distinguishes the blackberry is the connection between the berry and the torus (receptacle or stem). When a raspberry is picked, the torus remains on the vine. This is why there is a hollow core in the raspberry fruit. When a blackberry is picked, the torus stays with the fruit.

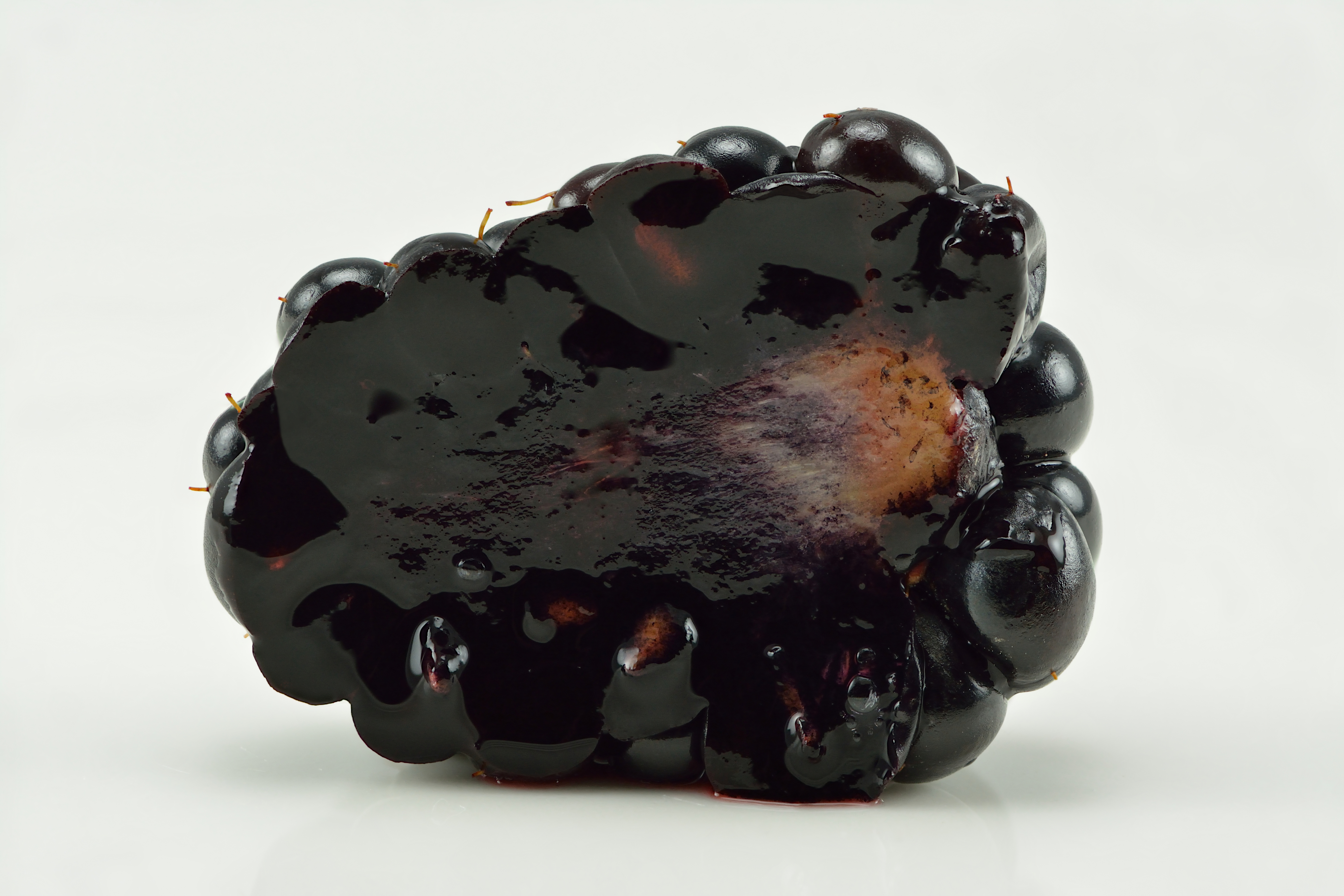
Halved blackberry with present torus

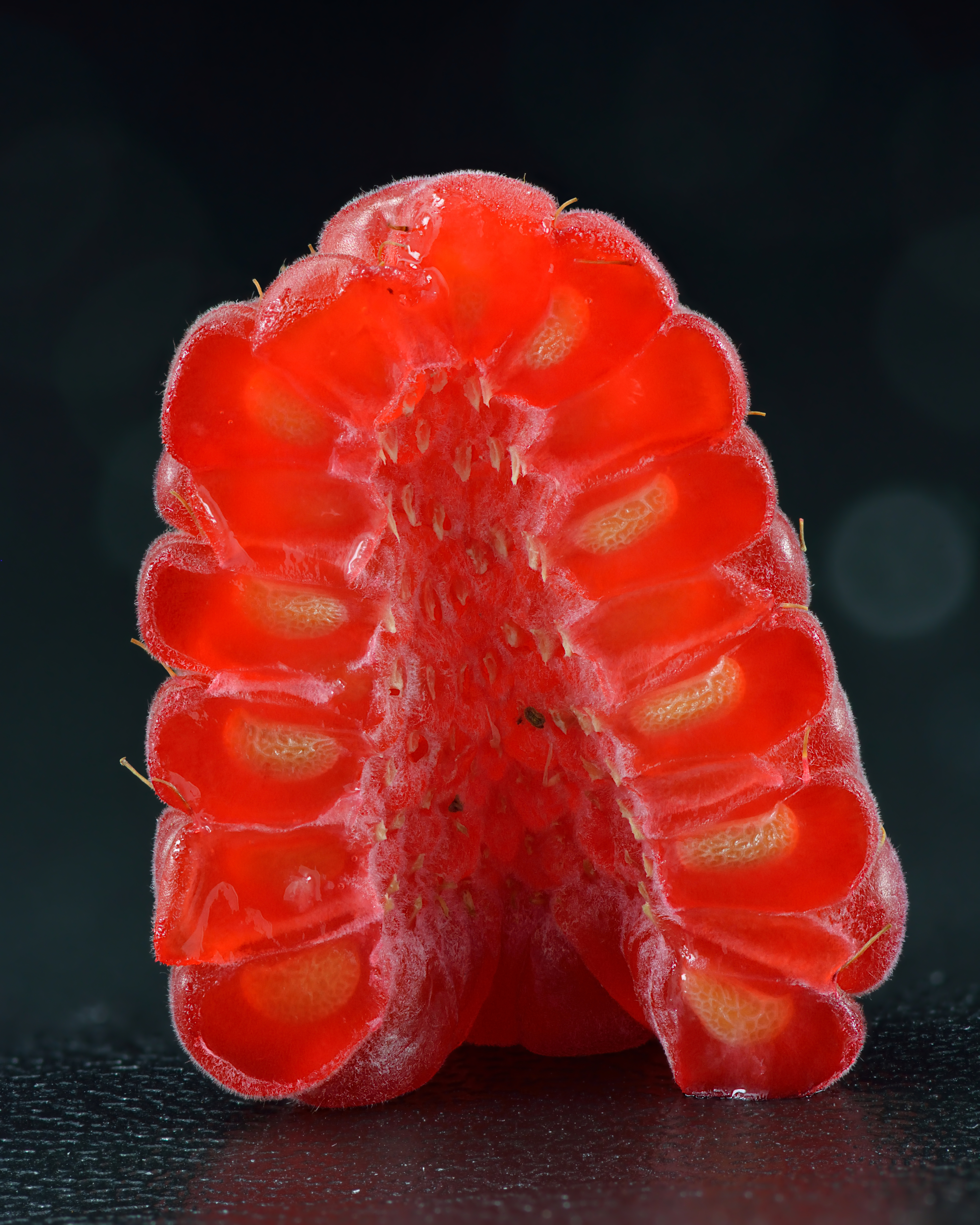
Halved raspberry with absent torus, for contrast

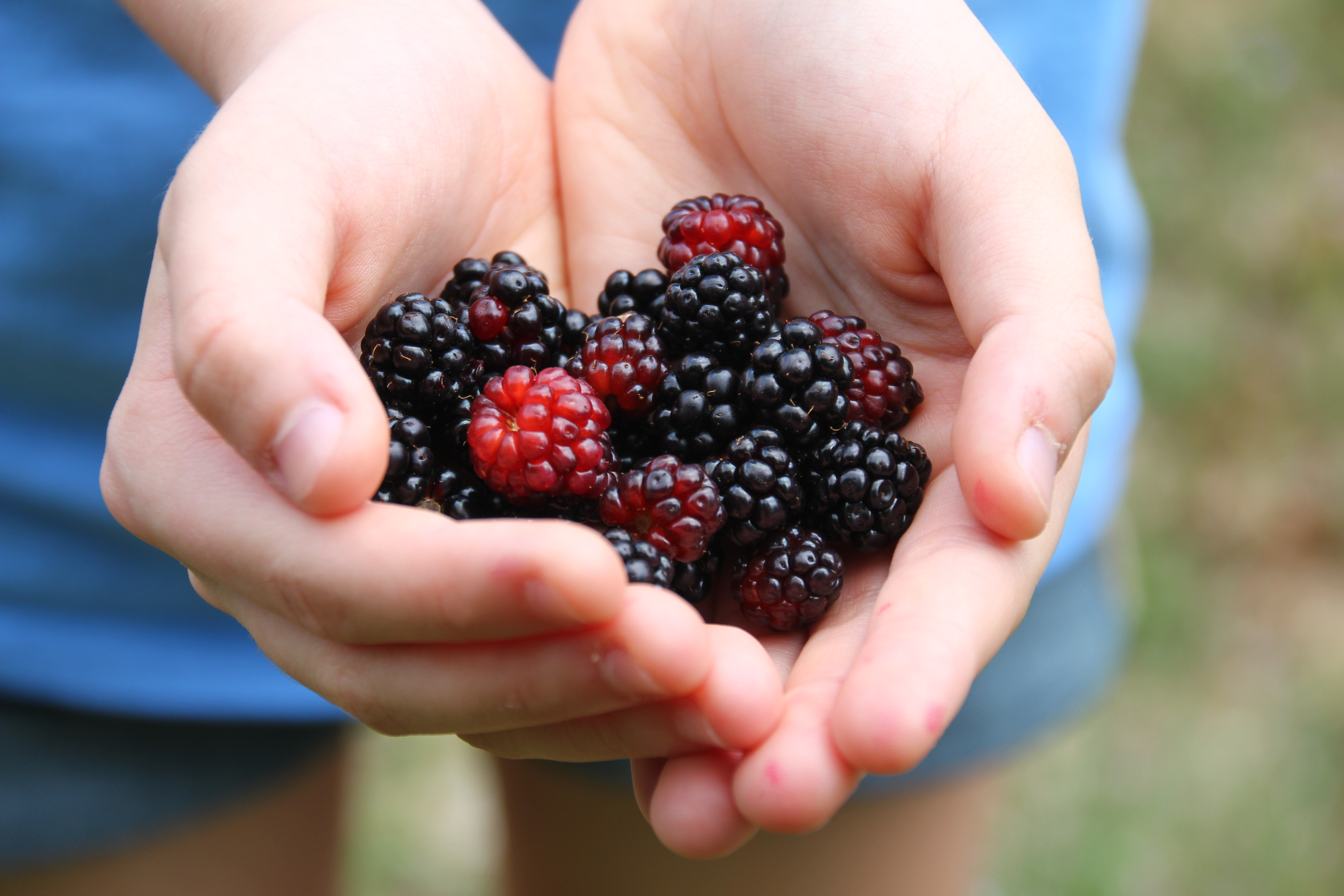
Wild blackberries picked in May in Texas

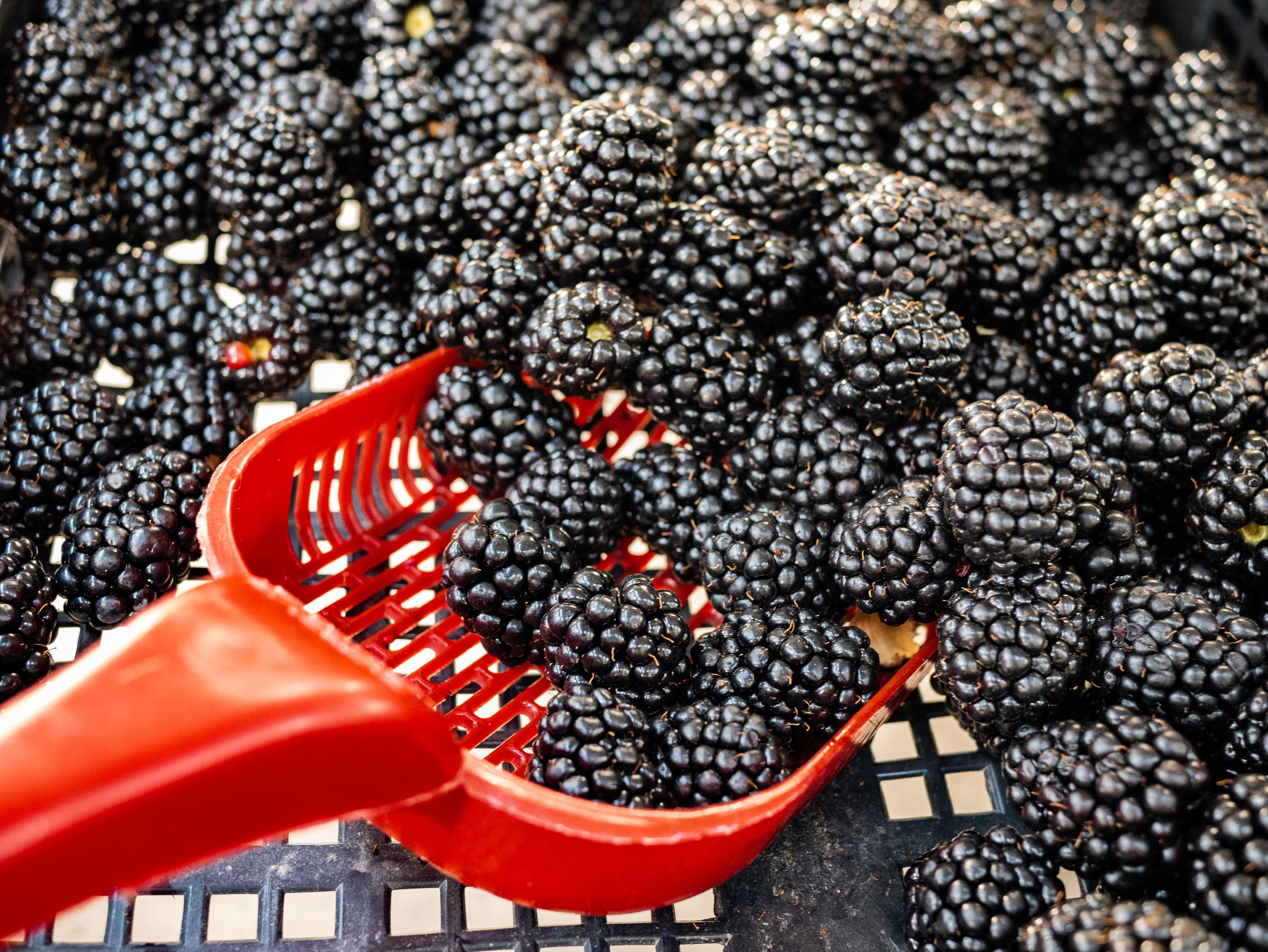
Blackberries from Srem, Serbia

The term bramble, a word referring to any impenetrable thicket, has in some circles traditionally been applied specifically to the blackberry or its products, though in the United States it applies to all members of the genus Rubus. In the western US, the term caneberry is used to refer to blackberries and raspberries as a group rather than the term bramble. Briar or brier may be used to refer to the dense vines of the plant, though this name is used for other thorny thickets (such as Smilax) as well.

The usually black fruit is not a berry in the botanical sense, as it is termed botanically as an aggregate fruit, composed of small drupelets. It is a widespread and well-known group of over 375 species, many of which are closely related apomictic microspecies native throughout Europe, northwestern Africa, temperate western and central Asia and North and South America.

=== Plants ===
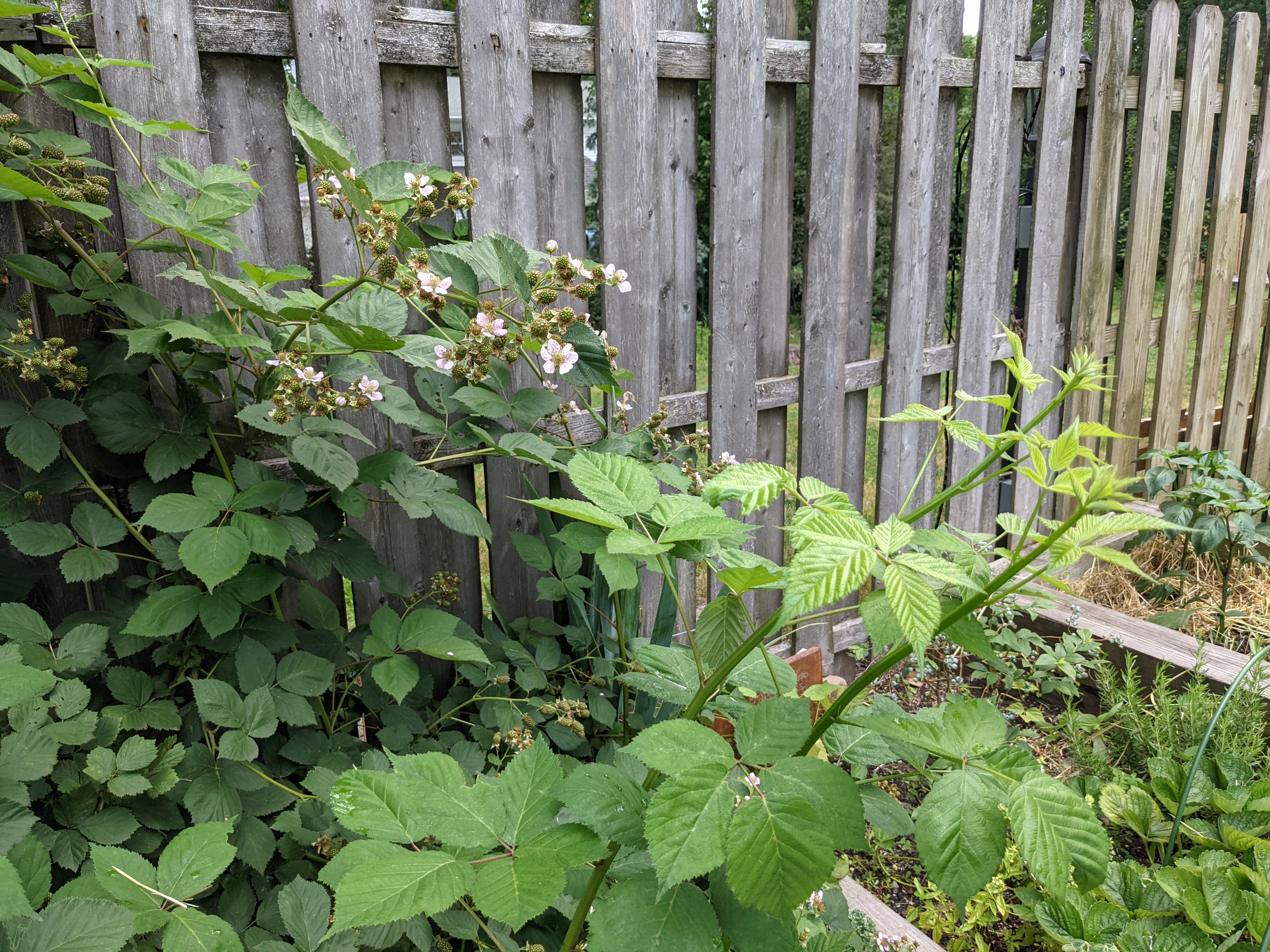
Second-year flowering, fruiting floricanes to the left. First-year primocanes without flowers or fruit growing on the right.

Blackberries are perennial plants bearing biennial stems (called canes) from their roots.

In its first year, a new stem, the primocane, reaches a full length of about 3–6 metres (10–20 feet) trailing on the ground and bearing large palmate compound leaves with 5–7 new leaves; it does not produce any flowers. In its second year, the cane is a floricane with a non-growing stem. The lateral buds open to produce flowering laterals. First- and second-year shoots produce short-curved, sharp thorns. Thornless cultivars have been developed during the early 21st century.

Unmanaged plants tend to aggregate in a dense tangle of stems and branches, which can be controlled in gardens or farms using trellises. Blackberry shrubs can tolerate poor soils, spreading readily in wasteland, ditches, and roadsides.

The flowers bloom in late spring and early summer on the tips of branches. Each flower is about 2–3 centimetres (3/4–1 1/4 inches) in diameter, with five white-pink petals. Each drupelet develops around an ovule fertilized by a male gamete from a pollen grain. The most likely cause of undeveloped ovules is inadequate pollinator visits. Infection with raspberry bushy dwarf virus sometimes causes no visible symptoms and sometimes causes incomplete drupelet development and crumbly fruit.

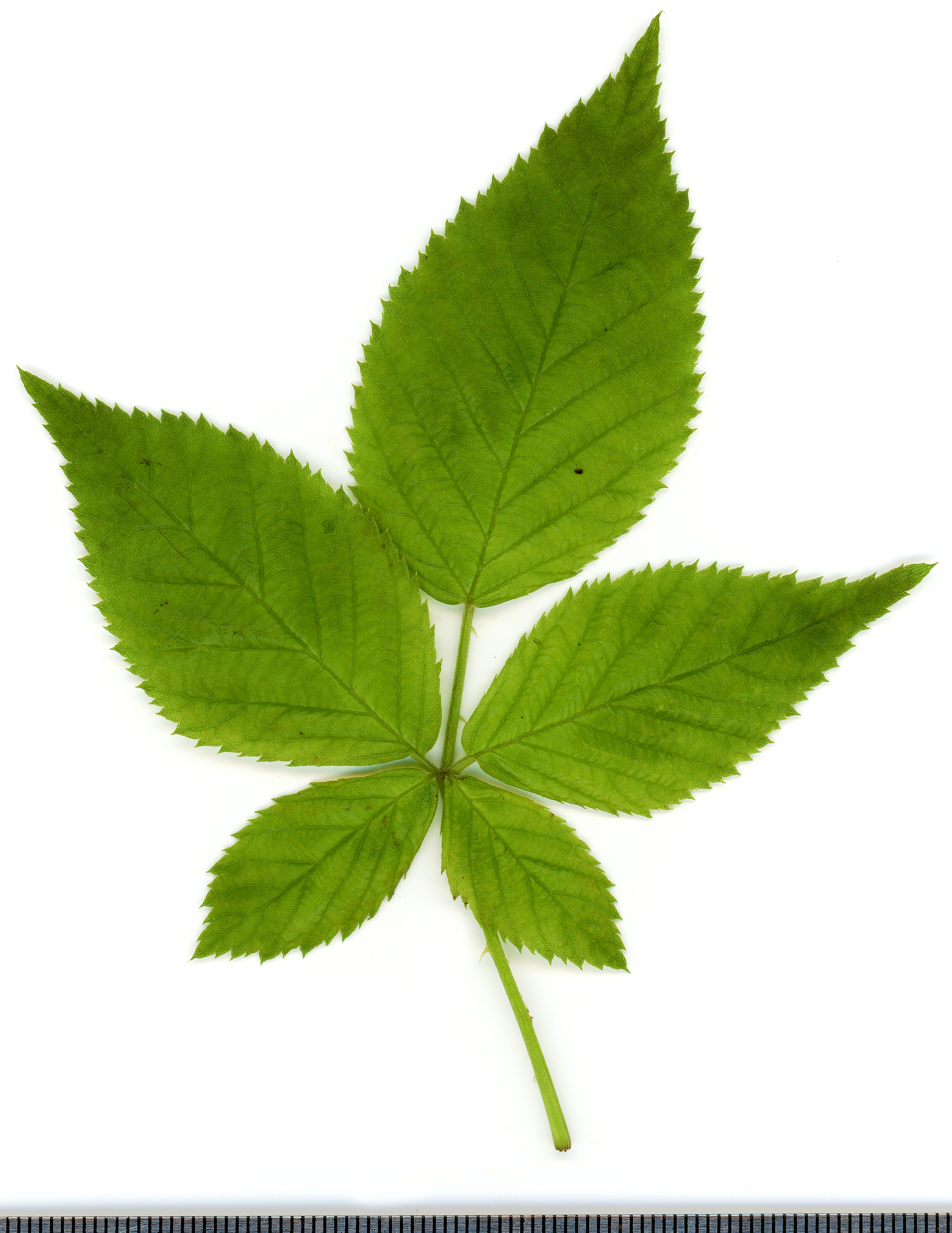
Leaf: adaxial side

=== Genetics ===
The loci controlling the primocane fruiting was mapped in the F Locus, on LG7, whereas thorns/thornlessness was mapped on LG4. Better understanding of the genetics is useful for genetic screening of cross-breds, and for genetic engineering to control for desirable traits.

== Ecology ==
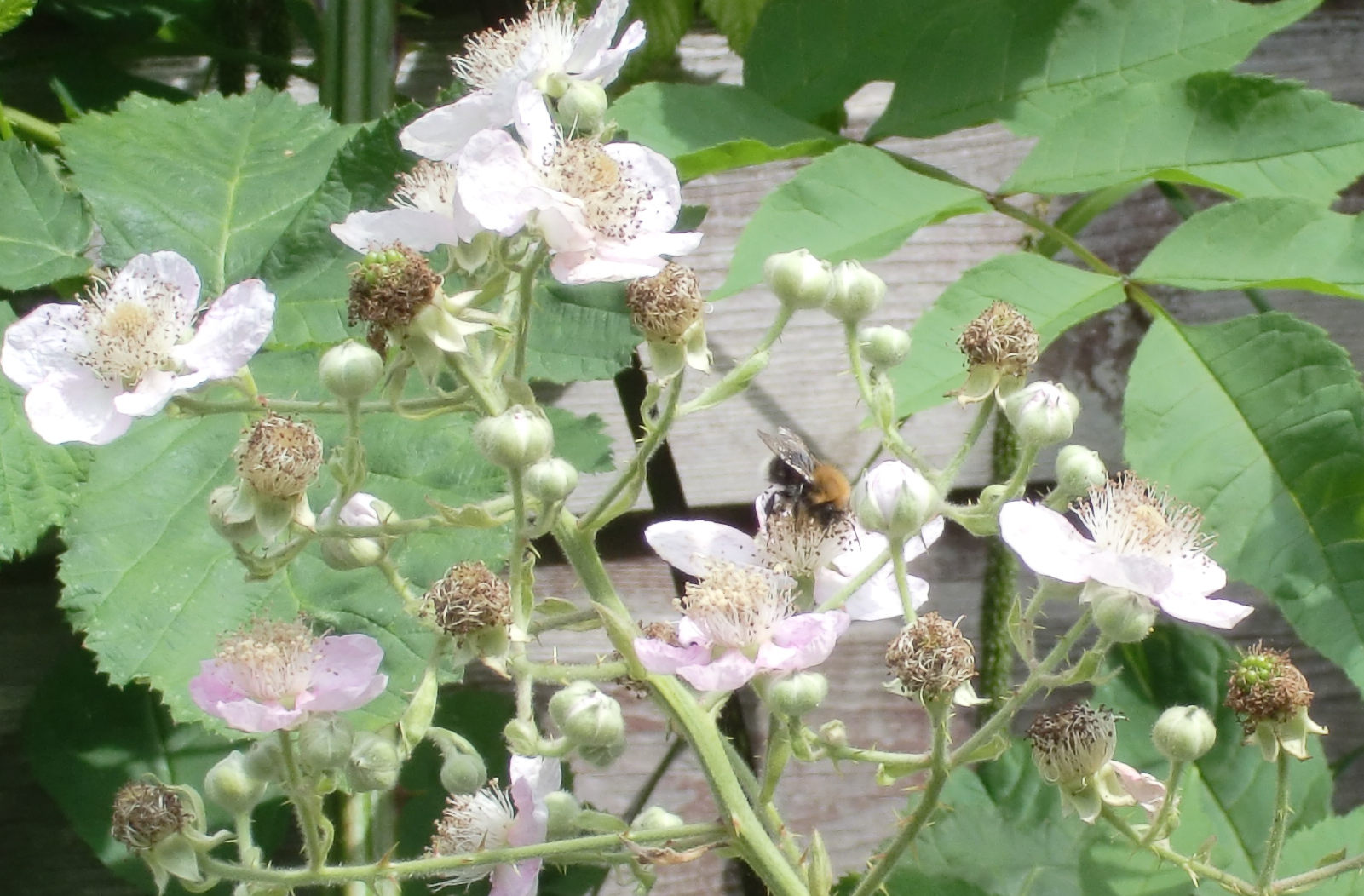
A tree bumblebee (Bombus hypnorum) pollinating blackberries

Blackberry leaves are food for certain caterpillars; some grazing mammals, especially deer, are also very fond of the leaves. Caterpillars of the concealer moth Alabonia geoffrella have been found feeding inside dead blackberry shoots. When mature, the berries are eaten and their seeds dispersed by mammals, such as the red fox, American black bear, and the Eurasian badger, as well as by small birds.

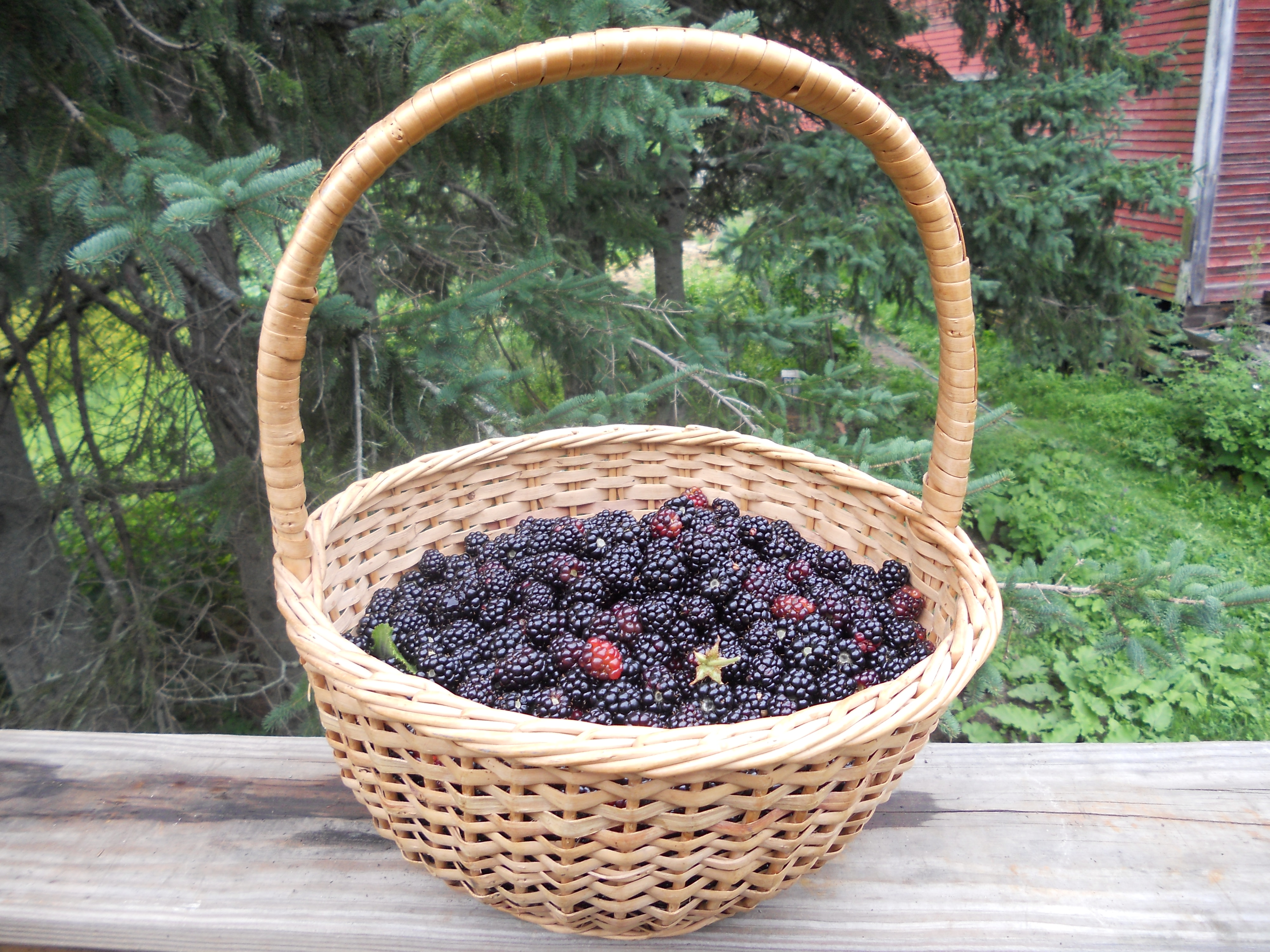
A wild blackberry harvest

Blackberries grow wild throughout most of Europe. They are an important element in the ecology of many countries, and harvesting the berries is a common pastime. However, their vigorous growth and tendency to grow unchecked if not managed correctly mean that the plants are also considered a weed, sending down roots from branches that touch the ground, and sending up suckers from the roots. In some parts of the world, such as in Australia, Chile, New Zealand, and the Pacific Northwest of North America, some blackberry species, particularly Rubus armeniacus (Himalayan blackberry) and Rubus laciniatus (evergreen blackberry), are naturalized and considered an invasive species and a noxious weed.

Blackberry fruits are red when unripe, leading to an old expression that "blackberries are red when they're green".

== Farming ==
Worldwide, Mexico is the leading producer of blackberries, with nearly the entire crop being produced for export into the off-season fresh markets in North America and Europe. Until 2018, the Mexican market was almost entirely based on the cultivar 'Tupy' (often spelled 'Tupi', but the EMBRAPA program in Brazil from which it was released prefers the 'Tupy' spelling), but Tupy fell out of favor in some Mexican growing regions. In the US, Oregon is the leading commercial blackberry producer, producing 19,300,000 kilograms (42,600,000 pounds) on 2,500 hectares (6,300 acres) in 2017.

Numerous cultivars have been selected for commercial and amateur cultivation in Europe and the United States. Since the many species form hybrids easily, there are numerous cultivars with more than one species in their ancestry.

=== History ===
Modern hybridization and cultivar development took place mostly in the US. In 1880, a hybrid blackberry-raspberry named the loganberry was developed in Santa Cruz, California, by an American judge and horticulturalist, James Harvey Logan. One of the first thornless varieties was developed in 1921, but the berries lost much of their flavor. Common thornless cultivars developed from the 1990s to the early 21st century by the US Department of Agriculture enabled efficient machine-harvesting, higher yields, larger and firmer fruit, and improved flavor, including the Triple Crown, Black Diamond, Black Pearl, and Nightfall, a marionberry.

=== Hybrids ===
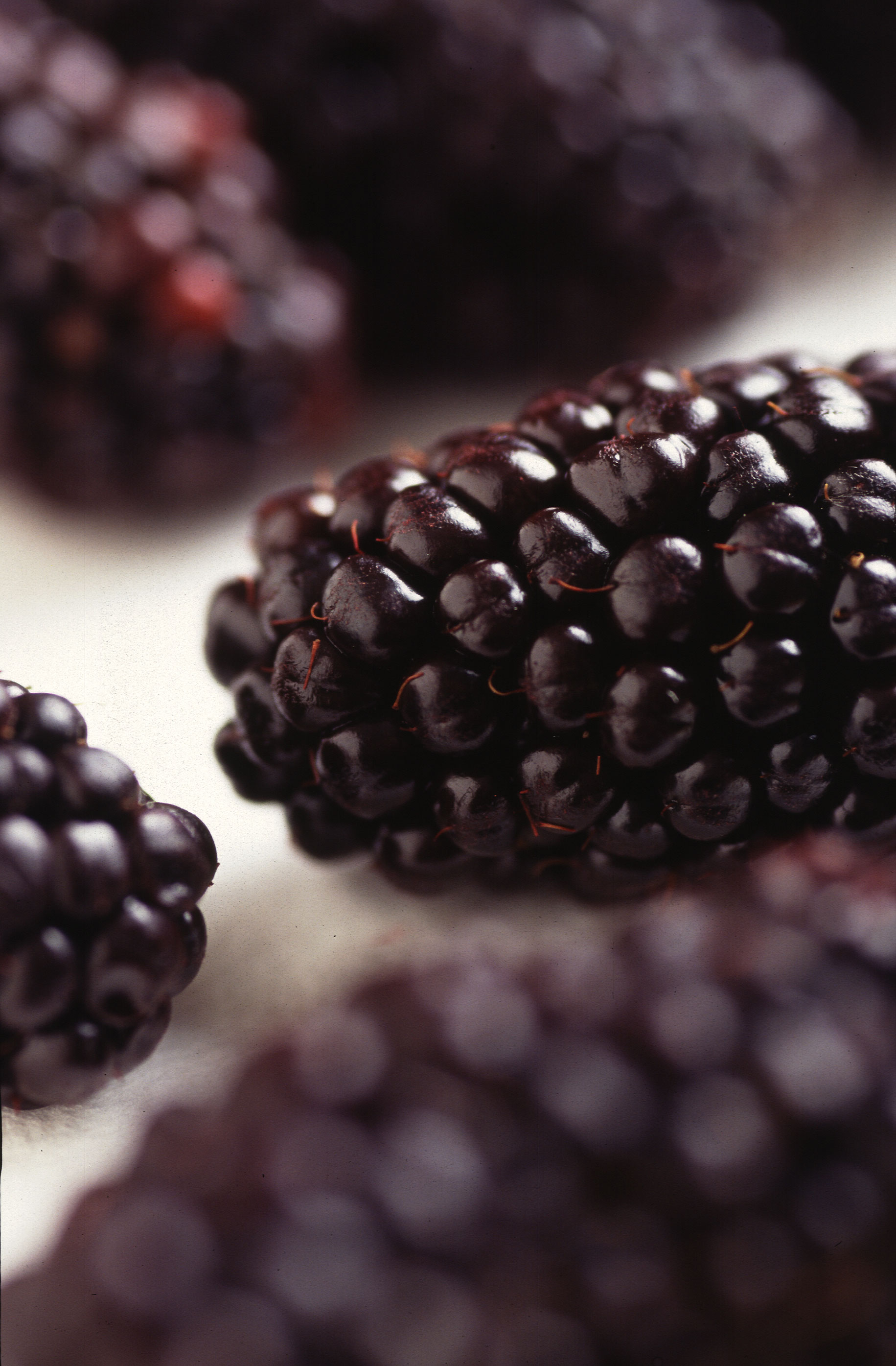
Black Butte blackberry

'Marion' (marketed as "marionberry") is an important cultivar that was selected from seedlings from a cross between 'Chehalem' and 'Olallie' (commonly called "Olallieberry") berries. 'Olallie' in turn is a cross between loganberry and youngberry. 'Marion', 'Chehalem' and 'Olallie' are just three of many trailing blackberry cultivars developed by the United States Department of Agriculture Agricultural Research Service (USDA-ARS) blackberry breeding program at Oregon State University in Corvallis, Oregon.

The most recent cultivars released from this program are the thornless cultivars 'Black Diamond', 'Black Pearl', and 'Nightfall' as well as the early-ripening 'Obsidian' and 'Metolius'. 'Black Diamond' is now the leading cultivar being planted in the Pacific Northwest. Some of the other cultivars from this program are 'Newberry', 'Waldo', 'Siskiyou', 'Black Butte', 'Kotata', 'Pacific', and 'Cascade'.

Varieties with good commercial characteristics developed in Arkansas are grown in nurseries in Oklahoma. Such blackberries are easy to grow, and may produce fruit for a decade or more. These varieties have diverse flavors varying from sweet to tart.

=== Trailing ===
Trailing blackberries are vigorous and crown-forming, require a trellis for support, and are less cold-hardy than erect or semi-erect blackberries. In addition to the Pacific Northwest, these types do well in similar climates, such as New Zealand, Chile, and the Mediterranean countries.

=== Thornless ===
Semi-erect, prickle-free blackberries were first developed at the John Innes Centre in Norwich, UK, and subsequently by the USDA-ARS in Beltsville, Maryland. These are crown-forming and very vigorous and need a trellis for support. Cultivars include 'Black Satin', 'Chester Thornless', 'Dirksen Thornless', 'Hull Thornless', 'Loch Maree', 'Loch Ness', 'Loch Tay', 'Merton Thornless', 'Smoothstem', and 'Triple Crown'. 'Loch Ness' and 'Loch Tay' have gained the RHS's Award of Garden Merit. The cultivar 'Cacanska Bestrna' (also called 'Cacak Thornless') has been developed in Serbia, since the 1980s.

=== Erect ===
The University of Arkansas has developed cultivars of erect blackberries. These types are less vigorous than the semi-erect types and produce new canes from root initials (therefore they spread underground like raspberries). There are prickly and prickle-free cultivars from this program, including 'Navaho', 'Ouachita', 'Cherokee', 'Apache', 'Arapaho', and 'Kiowa'. They are also responsible for developing the primocane fruiting blackberries such as 'Prime-Jan' and 'Prime-Jim'.

=== Primocane ===
In raspberries, these types are called primocane fruiting, fall fruiting, or everbearing. 'Prime-Jim' and 'Prime-Jan' were released in 2004 by the University of Arkansas and are the first cultivars of primocane fruiting blackberry. They grow much like the other erect cultivars described above; however, the canes that emerge in the spring will flower in midsummer and fruit in late summer or fall. The fall crop has its highest quality when it ripens in cool mild climates such as in California or the Pacific Northwest.

Most blackberry plants do not survive temperatures below −10 °F (−23 °C), but the 'Illini Hardy', a semi-erect prickly cultivar introduced by the University of Illinois, can survive colder temperatures than most cultivars. In comparative study at Urbana, Illinois, it was the only type to survive the 1989–1990 winter when temperatures dropped to −24 °F (−31 °C). It is one of only a couple varieties that is cane hardy in zone 5, where blackberry production has traditionally been problematic since canes often failed to survive the winter.

=== Mexico and Chile ===
Blackberry production in Mexico expanded considerably in the early 21st century. In 2017, Mexico had 97% of the market share for fresh blackberries imported into the United States, while Chile had 61% of the market share for American imports of frozen blackberries.

While once based on the cultivar 'Brazos', an old erect blackberry cultivar developed in Texas in 1959, the Mexican industry is now dominated by the Brazilian 'Tupy' released in the 1990s. The 'Tupy' has the erect blackberry 'Comanche', and a "wild Uruguayan blackberry" as parents. The Uruguayan cultivar is believed to be the widely grown 'Boysenberry', a hybrid of several different species of Rubus. To produce these blackberries in regions of Mexico where there is no winter chilling to stimulate flower bud development, chemical defoliation and application of growth regulators are used to promote blooming.

=== Diseases and pests ===
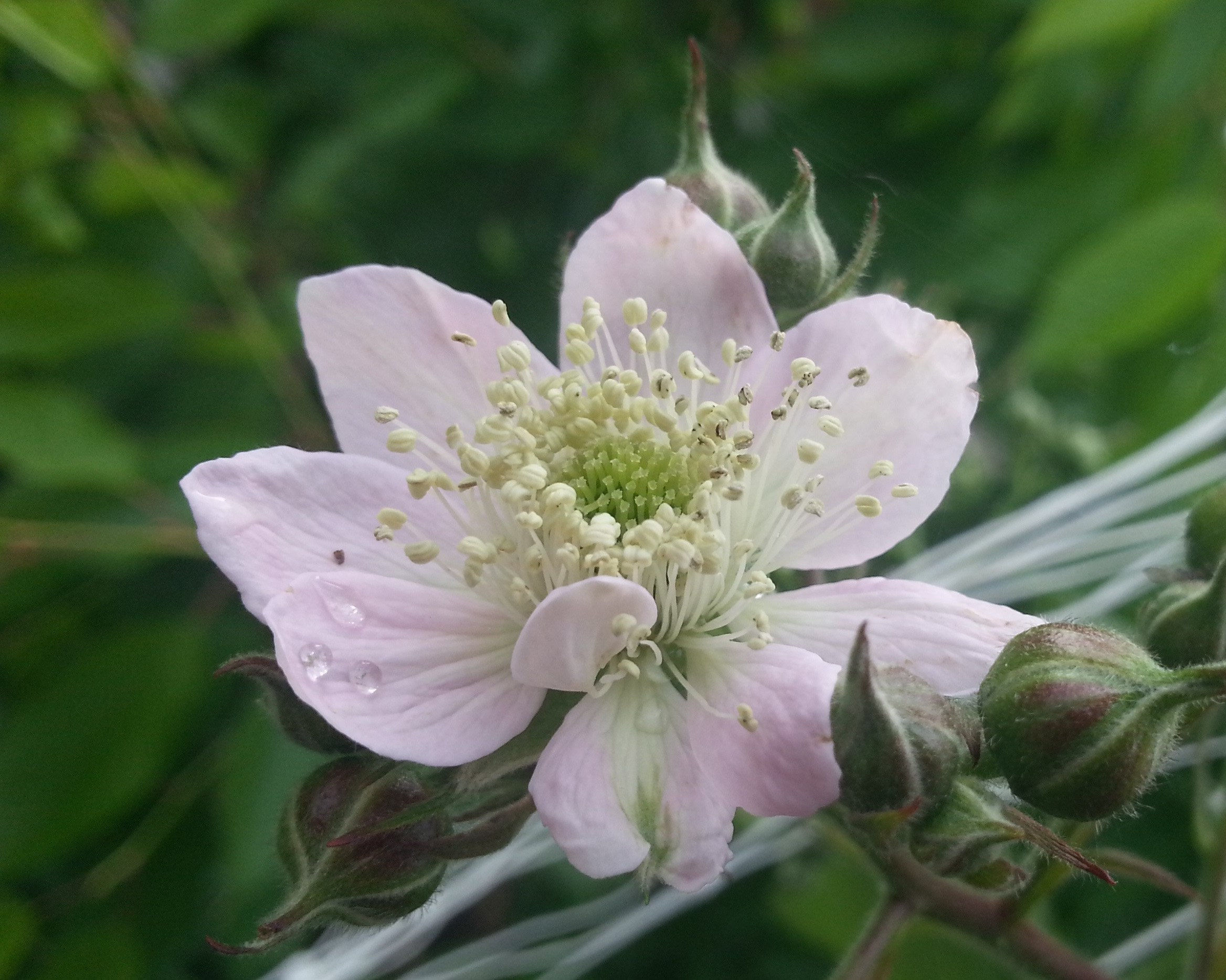
The pale pink blackberry blossom

Because blackberries belong to the same genus as raspberries, they share the same diseases, including anthracnose (a type of canker), which can cause the berry to have uneven ripening. Sap flow may also be slowed. They also share the same remedies, including the Bordeaux mixture, a combination of lime, water and copper(II) sulfate. The rows between blackberry plants must be free of weeds, blackberry suckers and grasses, which may lead to pests or diseases. Fruit growers are selective when planting blackberry bushes because wild blackberries may be infected, and gardeners are recommended to purchase only certified disease-free plants.

The spotted-wing drosophila, Drosophila suzukii, is a serious pest of blackberries. Unlike its vinegar fly relatives, which are primarily attracted to rotting or fermented fruit, D. suzukii attacks fresh, ripe fruit by laying eggs under the soft skin. The larvae hatch and grow in the fruit, destroying the fruit's commercial value.

Another pest is Amphorophora rubi, known as the blackberry aphid, which eats not just blackberries but raspberries as well.

Byturus tomentosus (raspberry beetle), Lampronia corticella (raspberry moth) and Anthonomus rubi (strawberry blossom weevil) are also known to infest blackberries.

== Uses ==
=== Nutrients ===
Blackberries, raw (Rubus spp.)
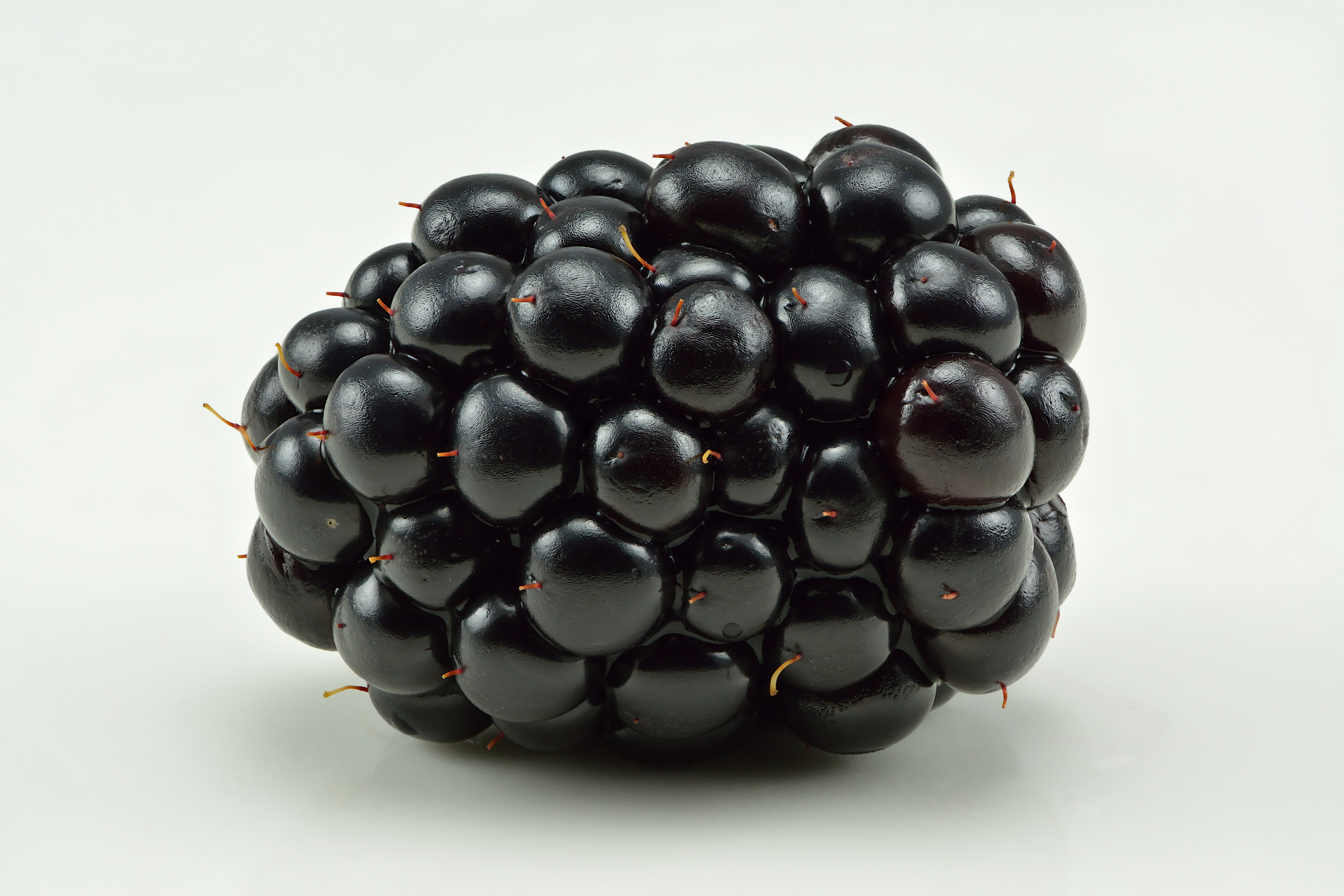
- Close-up view of a blackberry

Nutritional value per 100 g (3.5 oz)
- Energy: 180 kJ (43 kcal)
- Carbohydrates: 9.61 g
- Sugars: 4.88 g
- Dietary fiber: 5.3 g
- Fat: 0.49 g
- Protein: 1.39 g
Vitamins and minerals
Vitamins	Quantity %DV^{†}
Vitamin A	214 IU
Thiamine (B1)	2% 0.020 mg
Riboflavin (B2)	2% 0.026 mg
Niacin (B3)	4% 0.646 mg
Vitamin B6	2% 0.030 mg
Folate (B9)	6% 25 μg
Vitamin C	23% 21.0 mg
Vitamin E	8% 1.17 mg
Vitamin K	17% 19.8 μg
Minerals	Quantity %DV^{†}
Calcium	2% 29 mg
Copper	18% 0.165 mg
Iron	3% 0.62 mg
Magnesium	5% 20 mg
Manganese	28% 0.646 mg
Phosphorus	2% 22 mg
Potassium	5% 162 mg
Sodium	0% 1 mg
Zinc	5% 0.53 mg
- Other constituents: Quantity
- Water: 88 g
- Link to USDA Database entry
- ^{†}Percentages estimated using US recommendations for adults, except for potassium, which is estimated based on expert recommendation from the National Academies.

Raw blackberries are 88% water, 10% carbohydrates, 1% protein, and 0.5% fat (table). In a reference amount of 100 grams (3.5 oz), raw blackberries supply 43 calories, and are a rich source (20% or more of the Daily Value, DV) of dietary fiber, manganese (28% DV), and vitamin C (23% DV), with a moderate amount of vitamin K (17% DV) and copper (18% DV) (table).

==== Seed composition ====
Blackberries contain numerous large firm seeds containing omega-3 (alpha-linolenic acid) and omega-6 (linoleic acid) fats, protein, dietary fiber, carotenoids, ellagitannins, and ellagic acid.

=== Culinary use ===
The ripe fruit is commonly used in desserts, jams, jelly, wine, and liqueurs. It may be mixed with other berries and fruits for pies and crumbles.

=== Phytochemical research ===
Blackberries contain numerous phytochemicals including polyphenols, flavonoids, anthocyanins, salicylic acid, ellagic acid, and fiber. Anthocyanins in blackberries are responsible for their rich dark color. One report placed blackberries at the top of more than 1,000 polyphenol-rich foods consumed in the United States, but this concept of a health benefit from consuming dark-colored foods like blackberries remains scientifically unverified and not accepted for health claims on food labels.

=== Historical uses ===
One of the earliest known instances of blackberry consumption comes from the remains of the Haraldskær Woman, the naturally preserved bog body of a Danish woman dating from approximately 2,500 years ago. Forensic evidence found blackberries in her stomach contents, among other foods. The use of blackberries to make wines and cordials was documented in the London Pharmacopoeia in 1696. In the culinary world, blackberries have long been used alongside other fruits to make pies, jellies, and jams.

Blackberry plants were used for traditional medicine by Greeks, other European peoples, and aboriginal Americans. A 1771 document described brewing blackberry leaves, stem, and bark for stomach ulcers.

Blackberry fruit, leaves, and stems have been used to dye fabrics and hair. The shrubs have also been used for barriers around buildings, crops, and livestock. The wild plants have sharp, thick prickles, which offer some protection against enemies and large animals.

== In culture ==
Folklore in the United Kingdom and Ireland states that blackberries should not be picked after Old Michaelmas Day (11 October) as the devil (or a Púca) has made them unfit to eat by stepping, spitting or fouling on them. There is some value in this legend as autumn's wetter and cooler weather often allows the fruit to become infected by various molds such as Botryotinia which give the fruit an unpleasant look and may be toxic. According to some traditions, a blackberry's deep purple color represents Jesus's blood and the crown of thorns was made of brambles, although other thorny plants, such as Crataegus (hawthorn) and Euphorbia milii (crown of thorns plant), have been proposed as the material for the crown.

== See also ==
- Rubus plicatus, a common European species of blackberry
- Rubus ulmifolius, another common European species of blackberry
- Pacific blackberry, a North American species of blackberry
- Rubus fruticosus, an ambiguous name used by Carl Linnaeus that applied to multiple species
- Mulberry, similar fruit appearance, but a tree rather than a bramble
- Redberry mite, a common pest of North American blackberry crops
