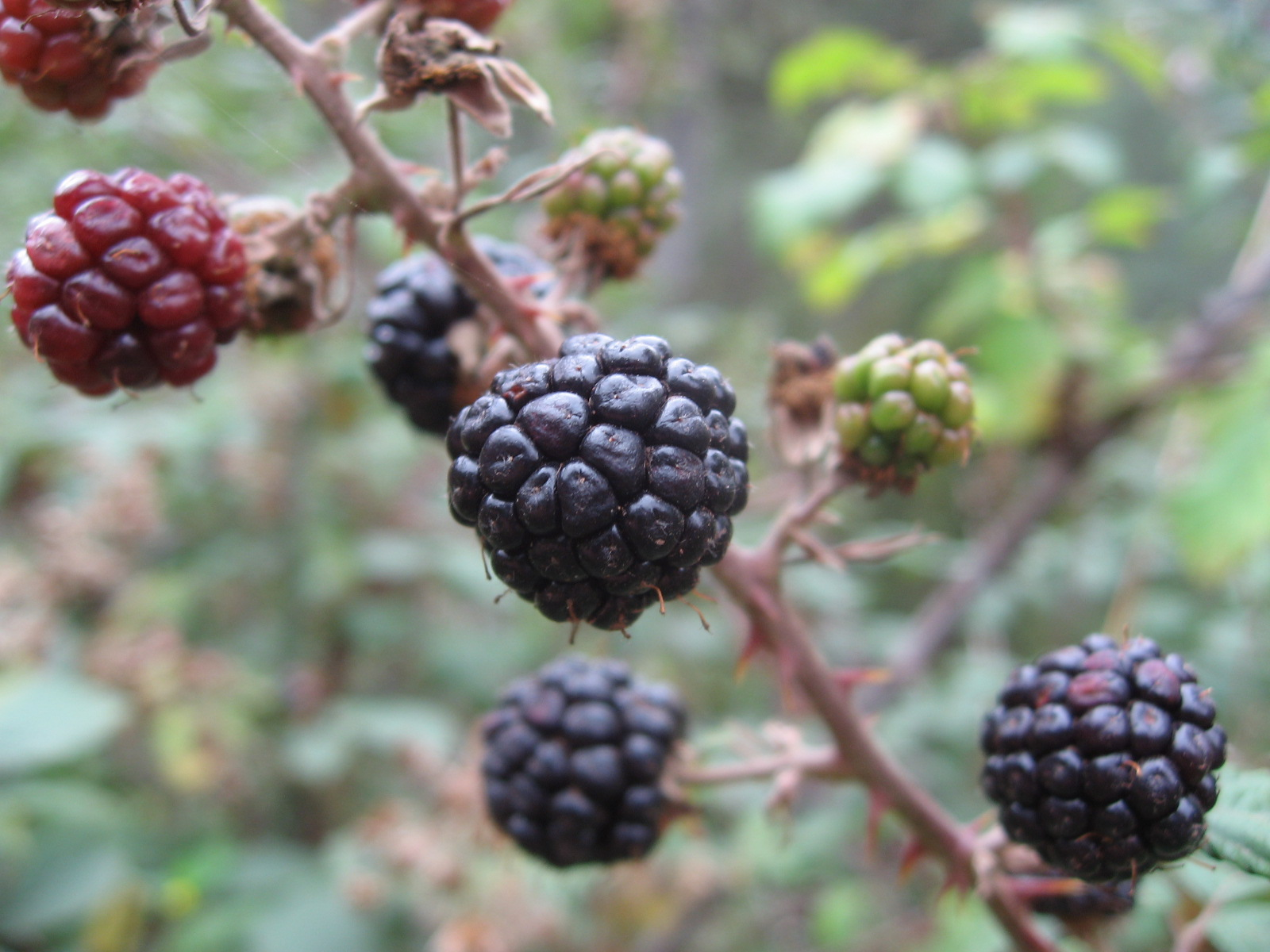

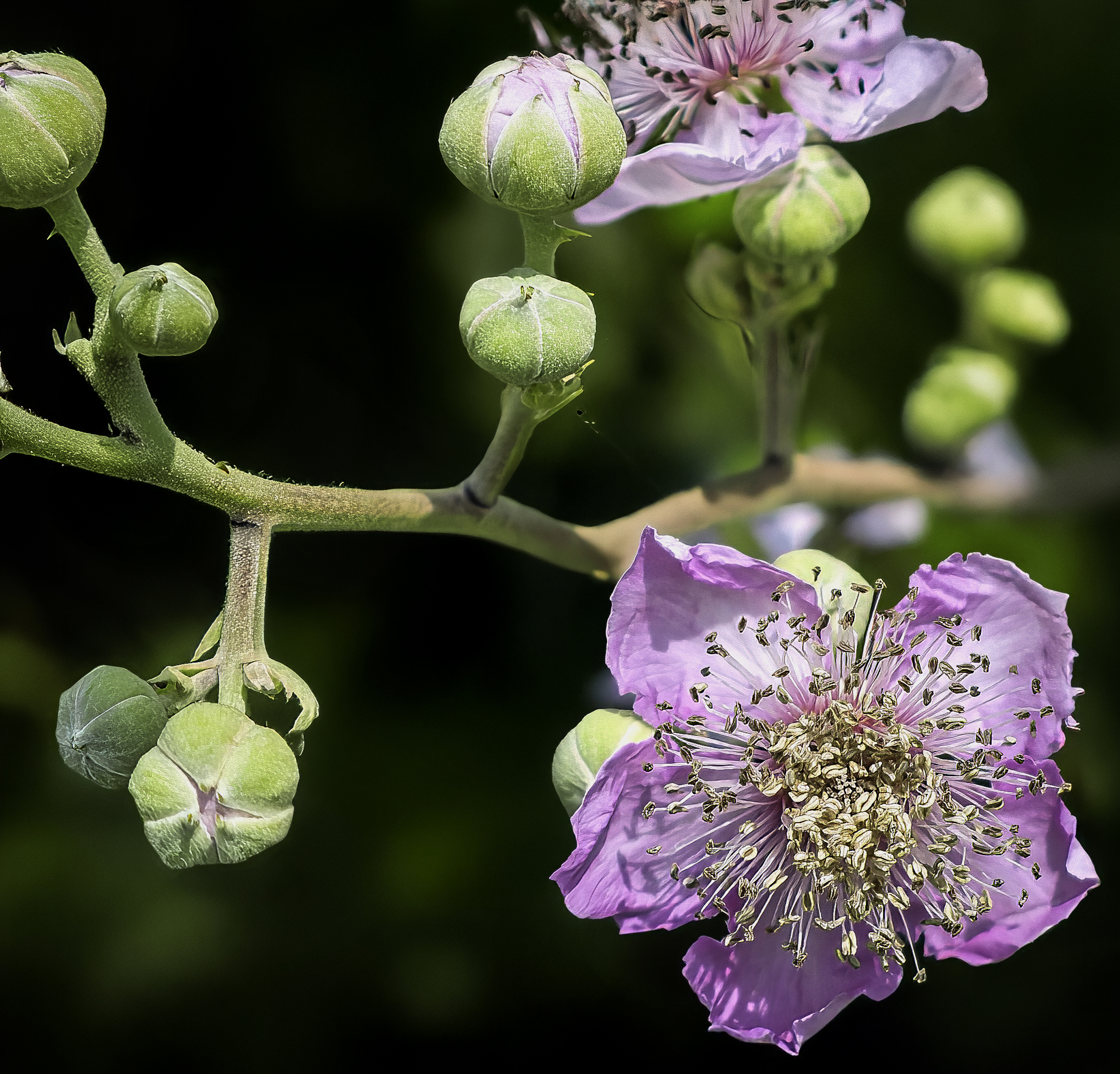

Scientific classification
- Kingdom: Plantae
- Clade: Embryophytes
- Clade: Tracheophytes
- Clade: Angiosperms
- Clade: Eudicots
- Clade: Rosids
- Order: Rosales
- Family: Rosaceae
- Genus: Rubus
- Species: R. ulmifolius

Binomial name
- Rubus ulmifolius Schott

Synonyms
- List: Rubus abruptus Lindl.; Rubus aetneus Tornab.; Rubus albescens Boulay & Gillot; Rubus appenninus Evers; Rubus bellidiflorus hort. ex K.Koch; Rubus bujedanus Sennen & T.S.Elias; Rubus castellanus Sennen & T.S.Elias; Rubus cocullotinus Evers; Rubus crispulus Gand.; Rubus discolor Syme; Rubus discolor Weihe & Nees; Rubus edouardii Sennen; Rubus gerundensis Sennen; Rubus hispanicus Willk.; Rubus inermis A.Beek; Rubus karstianus Borb s; Rubus legionensis Gand.; Rubus lejeunei Weihe ex Lej.; Rubus longipetiolatus Sennen; Rubus minutiflorus Lange; Rubus oculus-junonis Gand.; Rubus panormitanus Tineo; Rubus rusticanus Mercier; Rubus segobricensis Pau; Rubus siculus C.Presl; Rubus sinusifolius Sennen; Rubus × tridentinus Evers; Rubus valentinus Pau

= Rubus ulmifolius =

Berry and plant

Rubus ulmifolius is a species of blackberry native to western and southern Europe and northwestern Africa. It has also become widely naturalised elsewhere in Europe, and in northern India, the Americas, southern Africa, and Australasia.

== Description ==
Rubus ulmifolius is a bramble shrub that typically grows to 2–3 metres (6 ft 7 in – 9 ft 10 in) tall, adapted to more open, sunny habitats than many other blackberries. It usually has numerous small prickles. The leaves are palmately compound with 3 or 5 leaflets, the leaflets green on the upper surface but greenish-white on the underside because of a dense layer of woolly hairs.

The flowers are usually pink, sometimes white. The fruit is a compound drupe, ripening dark purple to almost black.

Rubus ulmifolius is unique among subgenus Rubus in displaying normal sexual reproduction; all other species are facultative apomicts.

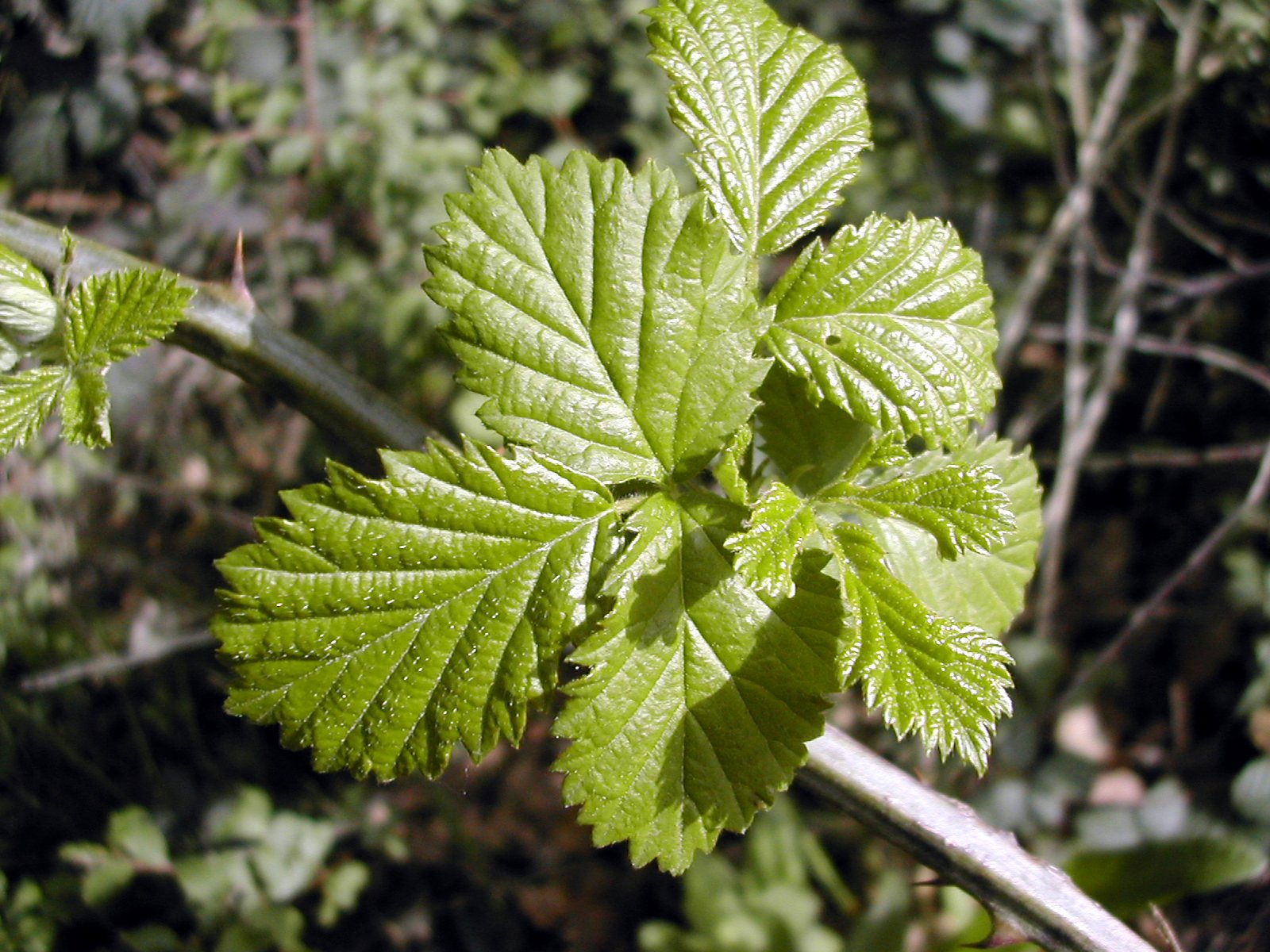
The leaves resemble those of elms.

A spineless form, Rubus ulmifolius f. inermis (Wild.) Rehd., is the progenitor of a number of cultivars grown for fruit, which is more easily harvested than in natural spiny forms.

== Subspecies ==
Rubus sanctus is often considered to be a subspecies of R. ulmifolius.

== Distribution and habitat ==
Rubus ulmifolius is found in its native range across Western Europe, from the Netherlands south to Spain and Portugal, in Britain and Ireland, as well as northwest Africa. It is naturalised in the west in the Americas (as well as southern South America) and Australasia.

In Britain and Ireland it is a plant of hedges and woodland edges on calcareous soils.
