= Reading Civic Centre =

Municipal building in Reading, Berkshire, England

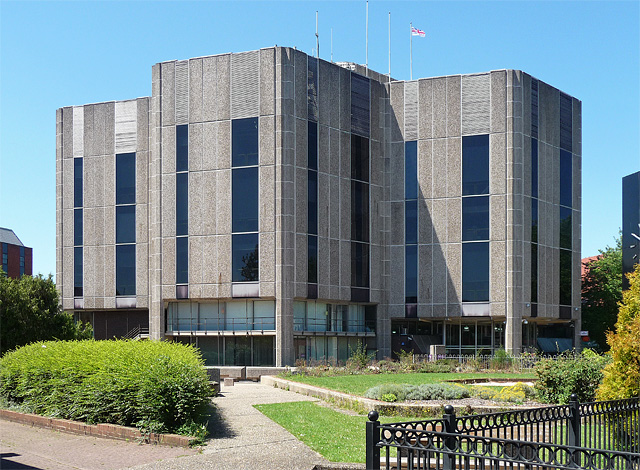
- Reading Civic Centre in 2011

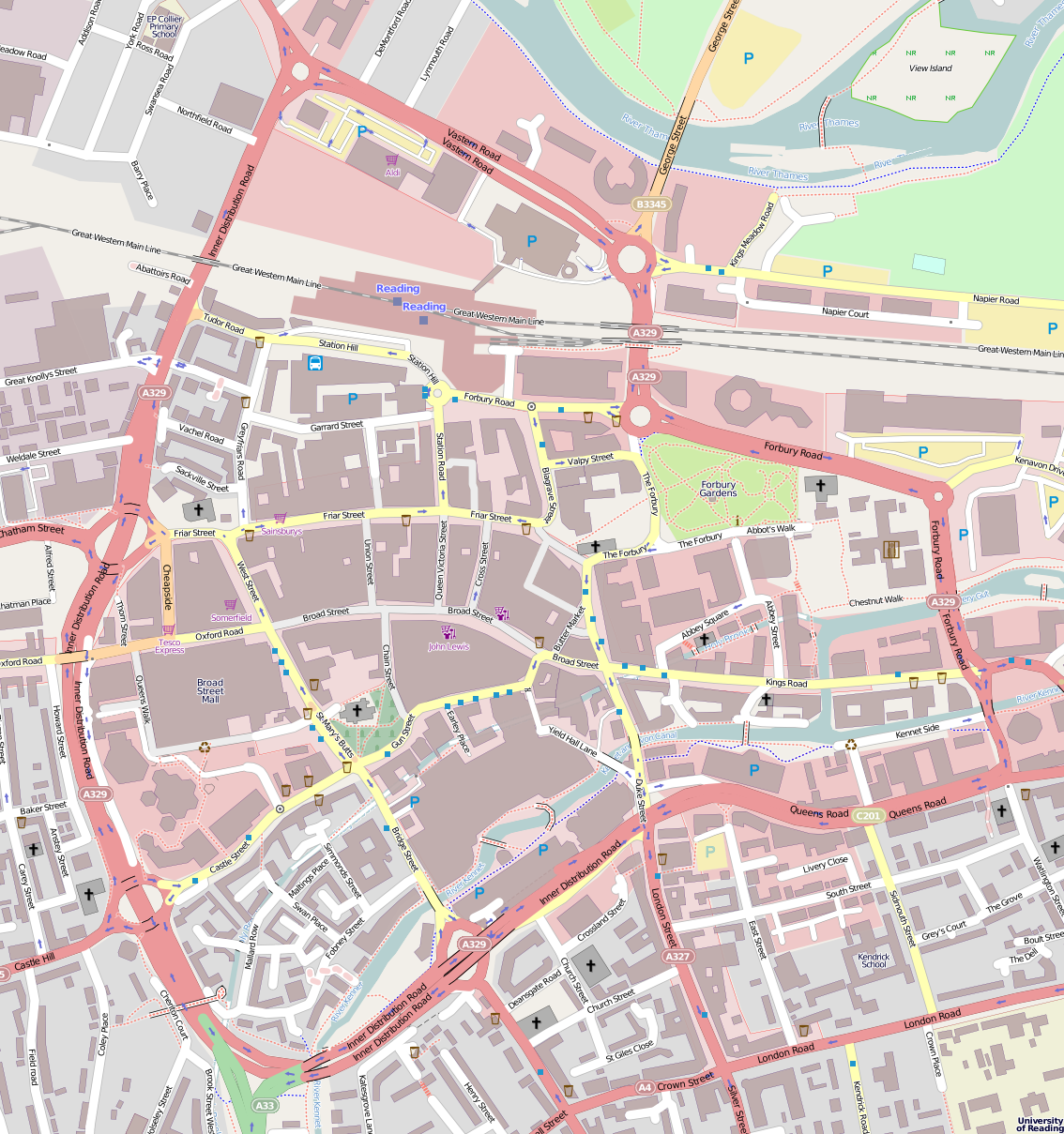
- Location within Reading Central

General information
- Type: Civic centre
- Location: Reading, Berkshire, UK
- Coordinates: 51.453519°N 0.976989°W
- Construction started: 1976
- Completed: 1978

Design and construction
- Architect: Robert Matthew, Johnson-Marshall & Partners

Reading Civic Centre was a civic centre in the town of Reading, itself in the English county of Berkshire. The centre dated from the mid-1970s.

== History ==
Prior to the 16th century, civic administration for the town of Reading was situated in the Yield Hall, a guild hall situated by the River Kennet near today's Yield Hall Lane. After a brief stay in what later became Greyfriars Church, the town council created a new town hall by inserting an upper floor into the refectory of the Hospitium of St John, the former hospitium of Reading Abbey. This was to remain the site of Reading's civic administration, through the successive re-buildings that eventually created today's Reading Town Hall, until the 1970s.

By the 1950s the administration of the town of Reading had overflowed the available offices in the Town Hall, and the council decided to build new civic offices. The decision was taken to build these at the opposite end of the town centre from the Town Hall, where land was available following slum clearance. The architect for the new civic offices was the firm of Robert Matthew, Johnson-Marshall & Partners, who also designed the new police station and Hexagon theatre. The new Civic Centre was officially opened by Queen Elizabeth II in May 1978.

In 2014, the civic offices were deemed to be at the end of its design life and the council gave approval for demolition. The civic offices were demolished between 2015 and 2016.

== Architecture ==
The civic centre originally comprised four adjacent and interlinked buildings. All four buildings were positioned around the southern and western sides of an above-ground public plaza, with the area below the buildings and plaza given over to service roads and car parking structures.

- Reading Civic Offices, housing the offices of Reading Borough Council
- Reading Police Station, the local headquarters of the Thames Valley Police
- Reading Magistrates' Court, the local magistrates' court
- The Hexagon, a local multi-purpose arts venue and theatre

Whilst the plaza, police station, magistrates court and theatre are still extant and in use for their original purposes, the civic offices became empty after Reading Borough Council relocated their offices to Bridge Street in 2014, and the civic offices were demolished between 2015 and 2016.
