= Reading School =

Grade II listed state grammar school in the United Kingdom

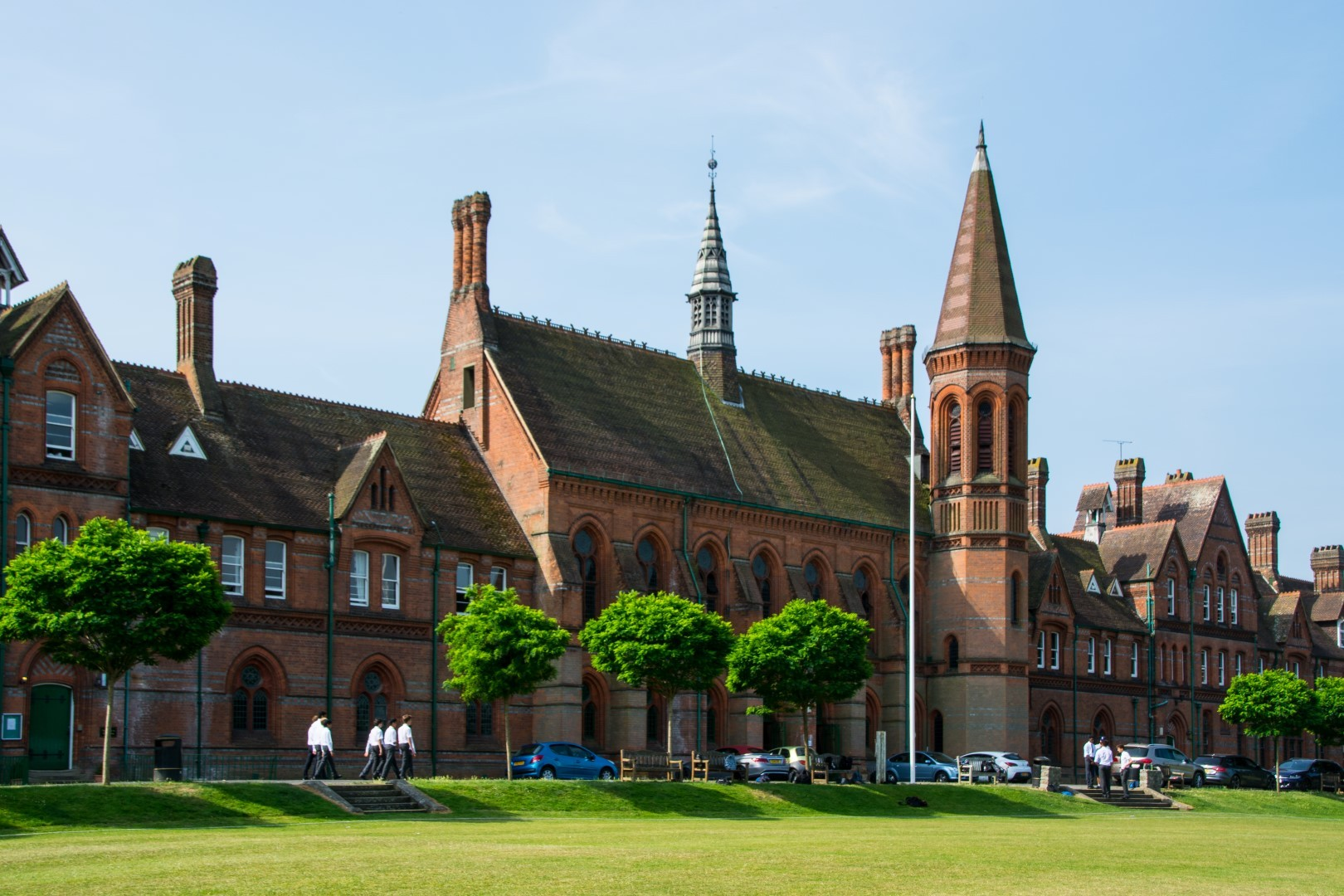
- Reading School

Location
- Erleigh Road; Reading, Berkshire, RG1 5LW; United Kingdom; 51°26′54″N 0°57′18″W

Information
- Type: Grammar academy; Day and boarding school; State boarding school
- Motto: Floreat Redingensis (Latin: May Reading [School] flourish)
- Religious affiliation: previously Church of England
- Established: 1125; 901 years ago 1486 (refounding)
- Founder: Henry VII
- Department for Education URN: 136449 Tables
- Ofsted: Reports
- Headmaster: Chris Evans
- Gender: Boys
- Age: 11 to 18
- Enrolment: 1,104
- Houses: County (maroon); East (pink/cerise); Laud (sky/blue); School (green); West (yellow)
- Colours: Navy Blue, Silver
- Publication: Floreat Redingensis
- Alumni: Old Redingensians
- Boarding houses: East Wing; South House
- Website: www.reading-school.co.uk

Reading School is a state grammar school for boys with academy status in the English town of Reading, the county of Berkshire. It traces its history back to the school of Reading Abbey and is, thus, one of the oldest schools in England, although it closed for a few years in the 1860s. It is a state boarding school. There are no tuition fees for day pupils, and boarders only pay for food and lodging. Reading is one of the best state schools in the UK according to the GCSE and A-level tables and has consistently ranked in the top ten.

== History ==
Reading School was founded as part of Reading Abbey. The date of the Abbey's charter, 29 March 1125, is taken as the foundation date, despite the closure of the school in the 1860s. This date makes it the 10th oldest school in England, although there are hints that there may have been a school running in Reading before this.

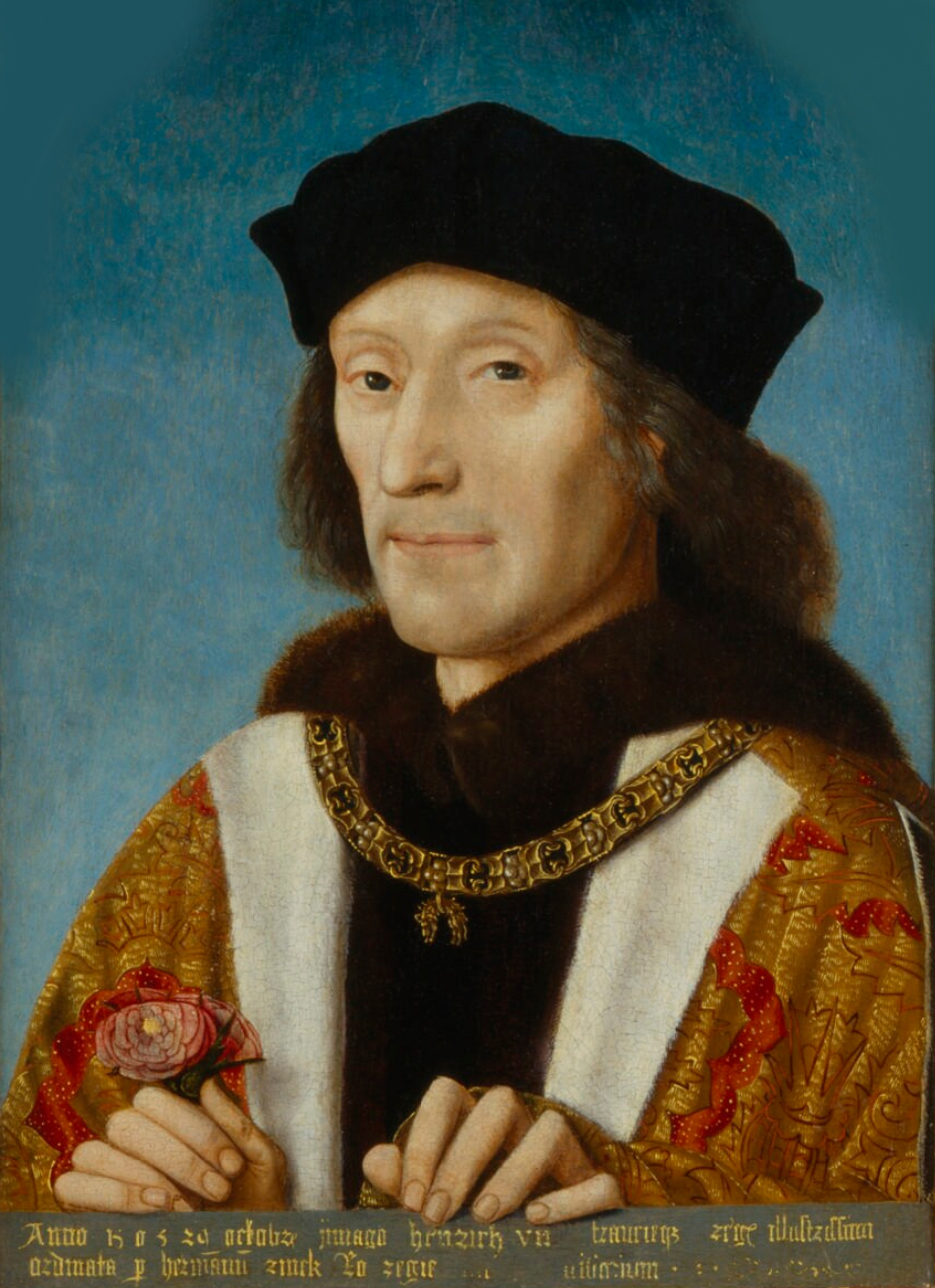
King Henry VII of England, who refounded the school in 1486

In 1486, the school was refounded as a "Free Grammar School" ("free" here meaning teaching the free, or liberal, arts, not that no fees were paid) by Henry VII on the urging of the then Abbot, John Thorne. From at least this time, the School was housed in the former Hospitium of St John. The main building of the hospitium still exists, but the refectory, which once housed the schoolroom, was demolished in 1785 and Reading Town Hall now stands on the site.

After the dissolution of Reading Abbey in 1539, the school fell under the control of the corporation of Reading, its status being confirmed by Letters Patent issued by Henry VIII in 1541. This was reconfirmed in the royal charter granted to the Corporation of Reading by Elizabeth I in 1560, which made the corporation liable for the salary of the headmaster and gave them the power of appointing him.

There were interruptions to schooling in 1665, when Parliament, forced out of London by the Great Plague, took over the schoolhouse. The English Civil War also interrupted, with the school being used as a garrison by royalist forces. The school prospered at the start of the nineteenth century; in 1830, when Richard Valpy retired from the post of headmaster, there were 120 pupils. By 1866 disagreements between the town and school and problems with the lease on the school buildings had led to falling numbers. The school closed in the 1860s.

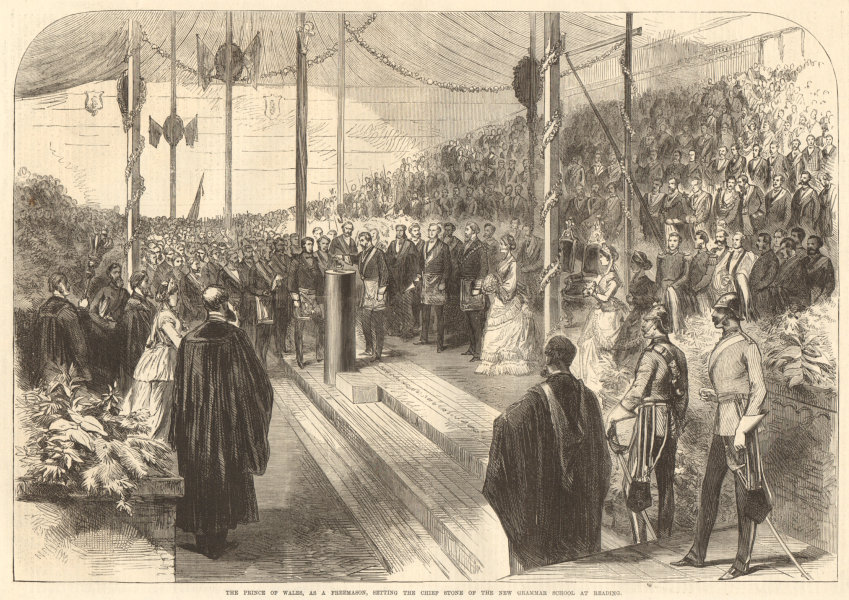
The Prince of Wales Edward VII, as a freemason, setting the chief stone of the new grammar school at Reading

Reading School Act 1867
- Act of Parliament
- Parliament of the United Kingdom
- Long title: An Act for the better Regulation of the Grammar School and John Kendricke's Loan Charity, Reading.
- Citation: 30 & 31 Vict. c. 5

Dates
- Royal assent: 12 August 1867

Text of statute as originally enacted

The school re-opened, however, with the Reading School Act 1867 (30 & 31 Vict. c. 5) setting out its administration and funding. The foundation stone for new buildings in Erleigh Road, designed by Alfred Waterhouse (who also designed the Natural History Museum, London), was laid by the Prince of Wales Edward VII in 1870, and in 1871 the school moved in. In 1915 Kendrick Boys' School (founded in 1875 from the legacy of John Kendrick), which had a large endowment but poor facilities, was taken over by Reading, which was poorly funded but had excellent facilities.

The Education Act 1944 saw the abolition of fees (apart from boarding charges), with the cost of education now being met by the local authority. The 1960s saw the rise of comprehensive education in England and Wales, but Reading was exempted in 1973 (along with the girls' grammar school in Reading, Kendrick) after a petition of over 30,000 local people (a third of the voters of Reading) was handed to the government.

On 6 July 2007 Reading School was officially designated as the landing site for the Thames Valley and Chiltern Air Ambulance when it needs to transport patients to the nearby Royal Berkshire Hospital. Previously, seriously injured or ill patients from the Reading area had to be flown either to Wexham Park Hospital near Slough, or to the John Radcliffe Hospital in Oxford for treatment. The new arrangement means that the school field can now be used for emergency touchdowns. Patients are transported by land ambulance from the school to the hospital's accident and emergency department across the road. While this arrangement was only made official in 2007, the school field had been unofficially used on several occasions by the Thames Valley and Chiltern Air Ambulance in previous years.

The school became an academy in 2012.

In 2020, the school was found to have discriminated against a visually-impaired child by not making adjustments to enable him to take the eleven-plus entrance examination.

== School site ==
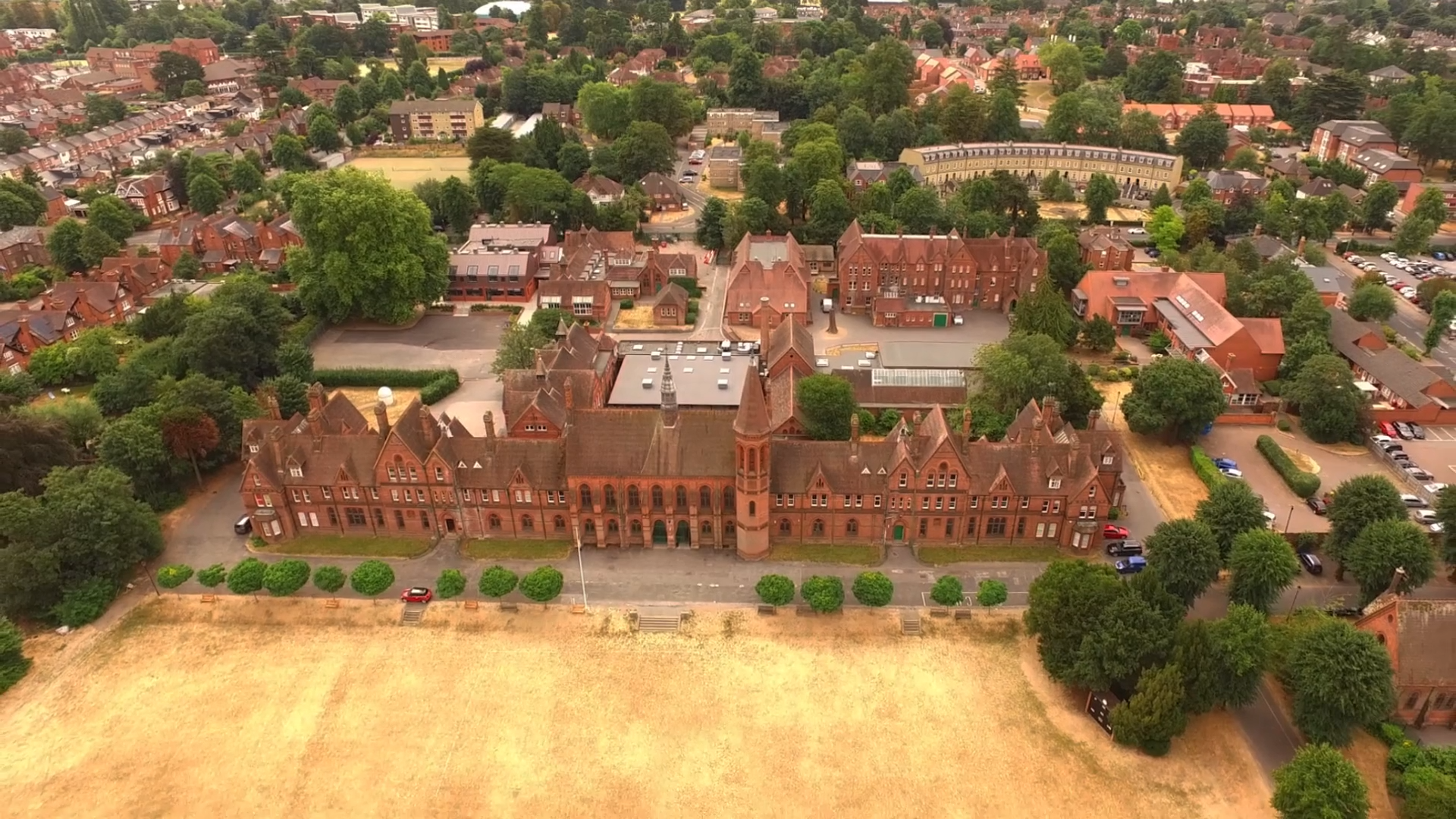
Reading School site from above.

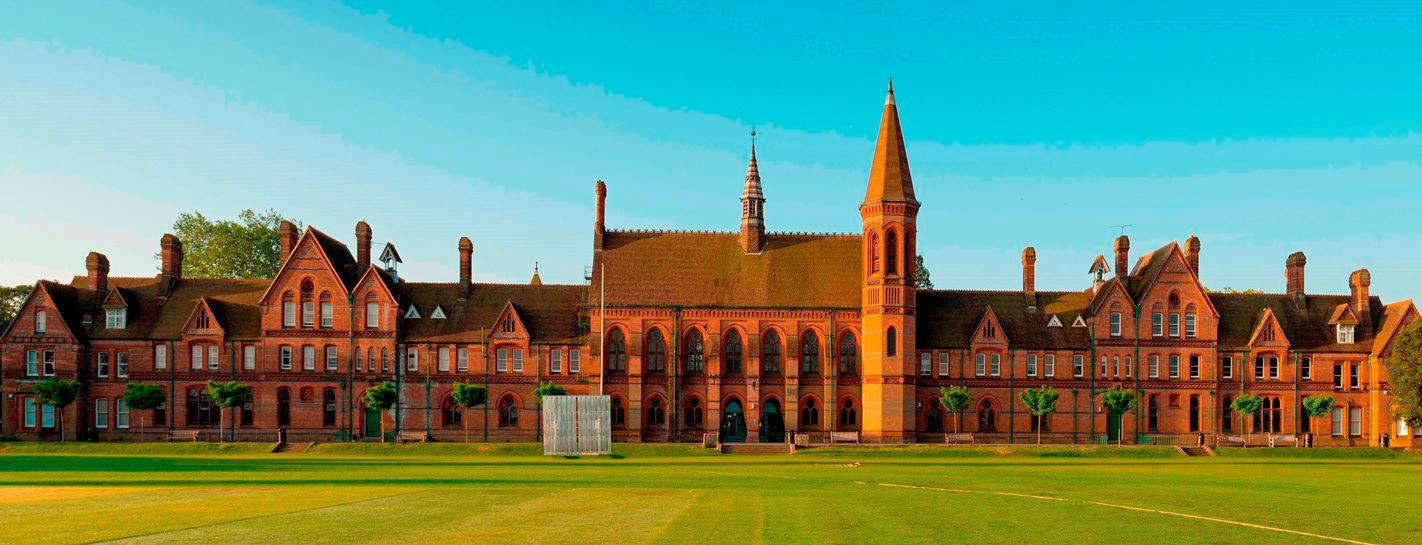
Reading School main building.

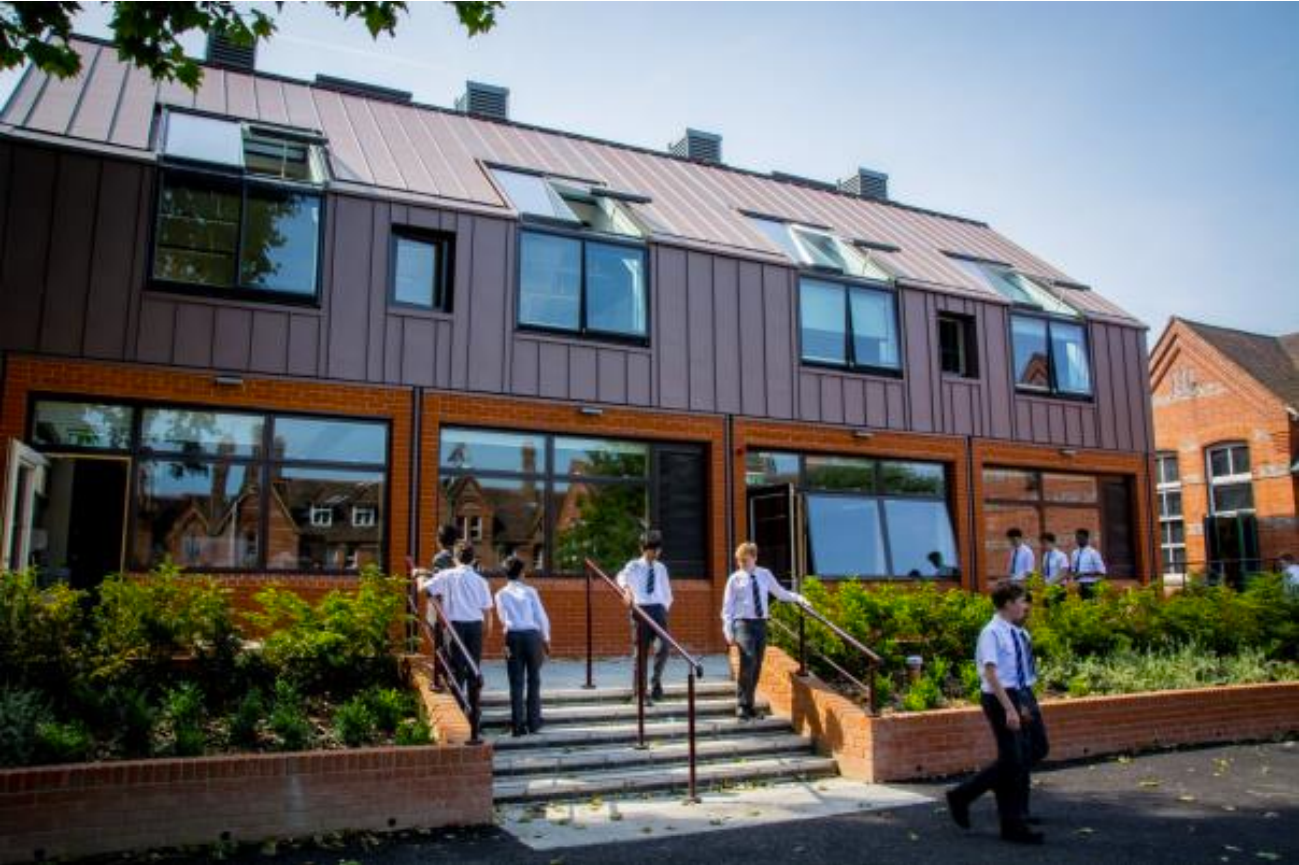
The Philip Mitchell Science Centre, Reading School

The current school site consists of a main block (with two wings), a Science block, the Page building, the John Kendrick building, South House, Music School (formerly known as Junior School) and a chapel. The main school building, the chapel, South House and the building to the east of South House have all been designated as Grade II listed buildings by English Heritage.

The chapel is where the school's Christmas, Remembrance and Easter services take place, and every student attends once a week. The chapel has four groups of pews, facing towards the central aisle. Above the entrance is the organ, and at the far end is the altar and vestry.

Plans have been developed for improved sports and science facilities as part of the "1125 campaign". Work on improving science facilities began in 2015 and was completed in Spring 2017 as stated above. Work on the new sports facilities has begun, with a new fitness suite made on the location of the old squash courts next to chapel, and refurbishments on the gym and changing rooms completed. Work to refurbish the Physics block began in 2022, finishing with an official reopening in early 2023.

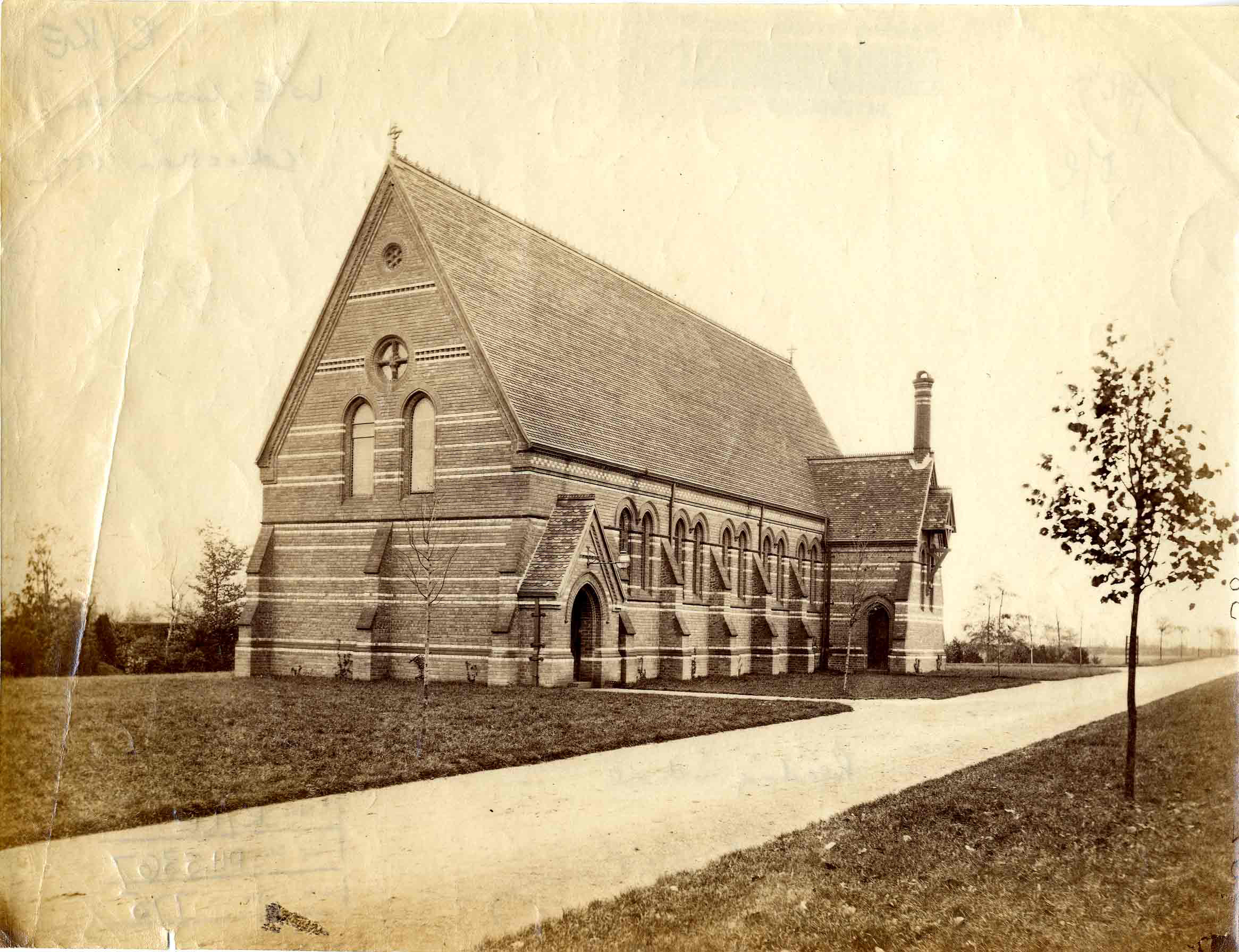
The Chapel, Reading School, c. 1873

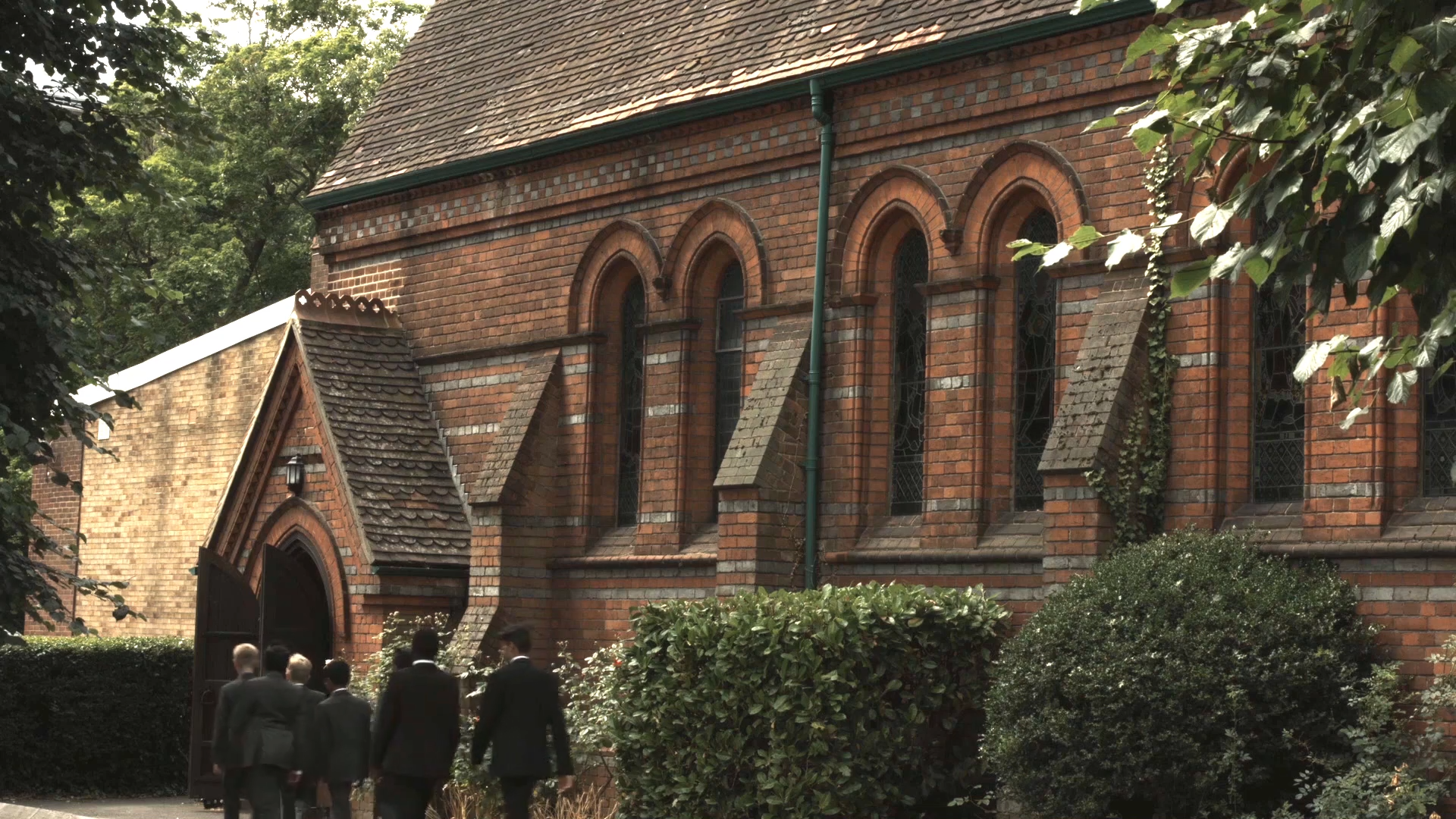
Outside The Chapel, Reading School

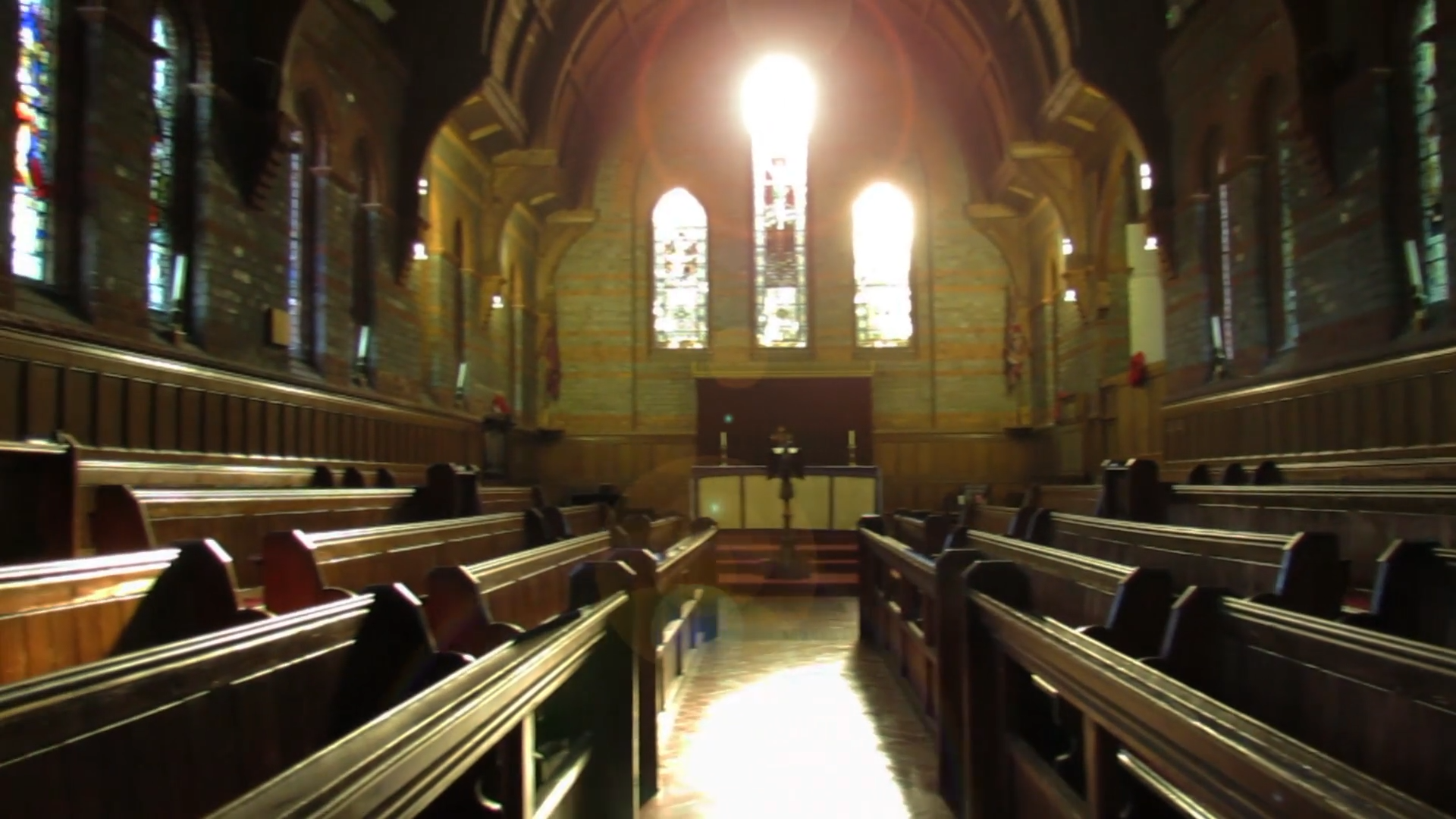
The Chapel Interior, Reading School

=== International sites ===
The school established a subsidiary in 2018 to participate in its cooperation with Lunhua Education and Lujiazui Corporation to establish international schools with "fusion" curricula called Suzhou Reading School in China. The first school, located on plot 2 in the town of Xushuguan in Suzhou New District, was planned to have a site area of 35,100 and construction area of 50,772 m^{2}. However, according to a report from Phoenix New Media, after completing construction in 2021, Reading School lost its license to operate there after failing its environmental assessment due to heavy soil pollution. The plot was reclassified as industrial land by the municipal Natural Resources and Planning Bureau in 2023.

== Sports ==
Reading School hold the boys' KS4 National Badminton Championship for the 2023/24 season. They also hold the U16 Boys' VICTOR School Sport Magazine National Badminton Championship for the 2023/24 season.

== Deceased Old Redingensians (chronological order) ==
Name	Year of birth	Year of death	Notable achievements
Sir Thomas White	1492	1567	Founder of St John's College, Oxford and Lord Mayor of London in 1553
Sir Francis Moore	1559	1621	MP for Reading
John Blagrave	c.1561	1611	Mathematician
William Laud	1573	1645	Chancellor of the University of Oxford 1629–1645, Archbishop of Canterbury, 1633–1645, beheaded in 1645 during the Civil War
John Kendrick	1573	1624	Elizabethan/Jacobean merchant and philanthropist
Daniel Blagrave	1603	1668	MP for Reading, Regicide (signatory of the death warrant of Charles I in 1649). Escaped to exile in Aachen at the Restoration in 1660
Sir Constantine Phipps	1656	1723	Lord Chancellor of Ireland (1710–1714)
Henry Vansittart	1732	1770	Governor of Bengal (1759–1764)
Francis Annesley	1734	1812	MP for Reading (1774–1806), First Master of Downing College, Cambridge
Henry Addington, 1st Viscount Sidmouth	1757	1844	MP, Prime Minister of the United Kingdom (1801–1804), Chancellor of the Exchequer (1801–1804), Lord President of the Council (1805, 1806–1807, 1812), Home Secretary (1812–1822)
Henry Bright	1784	1869	MP for Bristol (1820–1830)
Thomas Noon Talfourd	1795	1854	MP for Reading (1835–1841, 1847–49), Judge and writer
Admiral Sir Charles Elliot KCB	1801	1875	British Royal Navy officer, diplomat and colonial administrator. Chief Superintendent of British Trade in China (1836–41), first Administrator of Hong Kong (1841), Governor of Bermuda (1846–54), Governor of Trinidad (1854–56), and Governor of Saint Helena (1863–70).
Horace William Wheelwright	1815	1865	Lawyer, hunter, naturalist and writer
Sir Alexander Tilloch Galt	1817	1893	Politician and a father of the Canadian Confederation, Member of the Canadian Parliament (1867–72), Inspector General of Canada, Canadian Minister of Finance (1867), Canadian High Commissioner to the United Kingdom (1880–83). Founder of the Alberta Railway and Coal Company and founding president of The Guarantee Company of North America.
Captain Hastings Harington	1832	1861	Awarded the Victoria Cross as a lieutenant with the Bengal Artillery for conspicuous gallantry in the relief of Lucknow, 1857; died at Agra having achieved the rank of captain.
Joseph Wells	1855	1929	Warden of Wadham College, Oxford 1913–1927, Vice-Chancellor of the University of Oxford 1923–1926
Robert Hedley	1857	1884	English soldier and footballer, who captained the Royal Engineers team in the 1878 FA Cup Final. He was a centre-forward and was called up to the England squad against Scotland in 1878 and 1879.
General Sir Havelock Hudson GCB, KCIE	1862	1944	British Indian Army officer, commanded 8th Infantry Division during World War I. Member of the Council of India.
Lionel Cripps CMG	1863	1950	First Speaker of the Parliament of Southern Rhodesia
Sir Hugh Percy Allen	1869	1946	Director of the Royal College of Music, Professor of Music in the University of Oxford
Herbert Leader Hawkins FRS (elected 1937)	1887	1968	President of the Palaeontological Society, professor of palaeontology, University of Reading, authority on sea urchins
Major-General Charles Fullbrook-Leggatt CBE, DSO, MC	1889	1972	British army officer who served in both World Wars. Commanded the 61st Infantry Division
William Costin	1893	1970	President of St John's College, Oxford, Proctor of Oxford University.
Major General David Tennant Cowan CB, CBE, DSO & Bar, MC	1896	1983	British Army Officer in World War I and World War II. Led the 17th Indian Infantry Division during the Burma campaign.
Dom Christopher Butler O.S.B	1902	1986	A Benedictine Monk of Downside Abbey, Languages Scholar, Historian, Scripture Scholar, Theologian, Catholic Priest, Abbot of Downside, Abbot Primate of the English Benedictine Congregation, Auxiliary Bishop in the Archdiocese of Westminster, and the most prominent English reformer at the Second Vatican Council.
Arthur Negus OBE	1903	1985	Broadcaster and antiques expert
Malcolm Fewtrell	1909	2005	Detective Chief Superintendent who led the initial investigation into the Great Train Robbery in 1963.
Norman Gash CBE	1912	2009	Vice-Principal of the University of St Andrews (1967–1971). Historian, professor of modern history, who wrote a two-volume biography of Sir Robert Peel.
John Boulting	1913	1985	Film director and producer known for a popular series of satirical comedies in the 1950s and 1960s along with his brother, Roy Boulting.
Roy Boulting	1913	2001	Film director and producer known for a popular series of satirical comedies in the 1950s and 1960s along with his brother, John Boulting.
Horace Edgar "Tom" Dollery	1914	1987	England national cricketer and Warwickshire county cricket captain.
Basil Lam	1914	1984	Early Music scholar, harpsichordist, Head of Classical Music for BBC
John Minton	1917	1957	Artist, lecturer and teacher
George William Series FRS	1920	1995	Physicist, notable for his work on the optical spectroscopy of hydrogen atoms; Professor of Physics, Reading University (1968–1982)
Sir Clifford Charles Butler FRS	1922	1999	Physicist, best known as the co-discoverer of hyperons and mesons, Vice-Chancellor of Loughborough University (1975–1985)
Sir Douglas Lowe GCB, DFC, AFC	1922	2018	Pilot, Air Chief Marshal in the Royal Air Force
J. L. Ackrill	1921	2007	Professor of Classics at the University of Oxford. Philosopher and classicist, specialising in Ancient Greek philosophy.
Sir Richard Body	1927	2018	MP (1955–1959, 1966–2001), President of the Anti-Common Market League
Lord Roper of Thorney Island	1935	2016	MP for Farnworth (1970–1983), House of Lords Chief Whip, Liberal Democrats (2001–2005).
Sir Clive Sinclair	1940	2021	Entrepreneur and inventor.
Nigel David "Sharkey" Ward DSC, AFC	1943	2024	Former Royal Navy officer and fighter pilot who commanded 801 Naval Air Squadron during the 1982 Falklands War.
Lord McKenzie of Luton	1946	2021	Member of the House of Lords (2004–2021).

=== Living Old Redingensians (alphabetical order) ===
Name	Year of birth	Notable achievements
Paul Badham	1942	Professor of Theology and Religious Studies, University of Lampeter, Director of the Alister Hardy Religious Experience Research Centre
George W. Bernard	1950	Professor of Early Modern History at the University of Southampton
Roderick Campbell	1953	Lawyer, Former MSP (2011–2016)
Ross Brawn	1954	Former Technical Director of Benetton and Ferrari Formula 1 teams, former Team Principal of Honda F1, former owner of Brawn GP, former Team Principal of Mercedes Grand Prix and currently Formula One Managing Director of Motorsports.
Jonathan Davies	1994	International middle and long distance runner. Double 2017 Universiade medalist (1500m and 5000m) and 2019 European Cross-Country champion (mixed relay).
Mark Field	1964	Former MP (2001–2019) – Shadow Minister for London (2003–05), Shadow Financial Secretary to the Treasury (2005), Shadow Minister for Culture, Media and Sport (2005–06), Vice Chairman (International) of the Conservative Party (2016–17), Minister of State for Asia and the Pacific (2017–19).
Damian Green	1956	MP (1997–2024) – Shadow Secretary of State for Education and Skills (2001–03), Shadow Secretary of State for Transport (2003–04), Shadow Minister of State for Immigration (2005–10), Minister of State for Immigration (2010–12), Minister of State for Policing and Criminal Justice (2012–2014), Secretary of State for Work and Pensions (2016–2017), First Secretary of State and Minister for the Cabinet Office (2017) Chairman of the One Nation Conservative Caucus (2019–)
Sir Oliver Heald	1954	MP (1992–2024) – Shadow Leader of the House of Commons (2003–05), Shadow Secretary of State for Constitutional Affairs (Justice) (2004–07), Shadow Chancellor of the Duchy of Lancaster (2005–07) Solicitor General for England and Wales (2012–2014), Minister of State for Courts and Justice (2016–17)
Ben Loader	1998	London Irish Rugby player, England U20 International
Robert Ladislav Parker	1942	Geophysicist and mathematician, Professor Emeritus of Geophysics, Scripps Institution of Oceanography, University of California
Christopher Renshaw	1951	Theatre and Musical Director
Andrew Smith	1952	Former MP (1987–2017) – Shadow Chief Secretary to the Treasury (1994–96), Shadow Secretary of State for Transport (1996–97), Minister of State for Disability and Employment Rights (1997–99), Chief Secretary to the Treasury (1999–2002), Secretary of State for Work and Pensions (2002–2004)
Peter Swallow	1993	Current Member of Parliament for Bracknell (2024-).
David Warburton	1965	Former MP (2015–2023), composer and businessman
Edward Young	1966	Private Secretary to the Sovereign (2017–2023), Deputy Private Secretary to the Sovereign (2007–17), Executive at Barclays Bank and Granada PLC.

== Notable headmasters ==
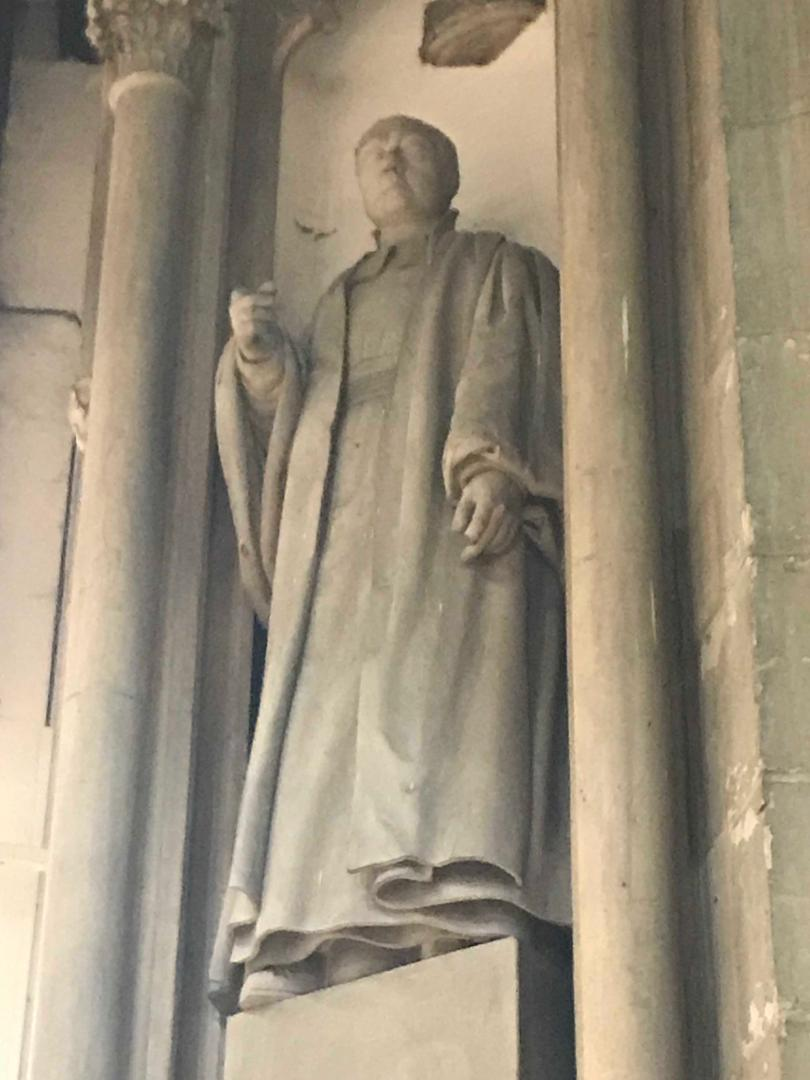
Dr. Richard Valpy by Samuel Dixon, St Laurence's Church, Reading (Roche Abbey stone)

- 1588–1589: Thomas Braddock
- 1781–1830: Richard Valpy (1754–1836)
- 1871–1877: Thomas Henry Stokoe

== Inspections and awards ==
A 2023 OFSTED report mentions "Impressively high aspirations for academic excellence", "Pupils’ attitudes to learning are consistently positive" and " A determination to provide the absolute best for pupils and to contribute to the wider community are abundantly clear in the collective work of trustees, leaders and staff". The 2005 Key Stage 3 results were both the best in the country for value-added and for the average points score of each student.

In the 2004 school league tables for England (including fee-paying schools), it came fifth for GCSE-level results (average 602.5 points), 106th for A-level results (average 409.3 points) and 170th for value-added between ages 11 and 16 (score of 1037.7 compared with a baseline of 1000). In 2005, it became a DFES specialist school for the Humanities, specialising in English, Geography and Classics – the first school to specialise in Classics – despite entry being selected by Mathematics and verbal and non-verbal logic ability.

In 2005 the school was awarded the Sportsmark gold award for a four-year period. In the same year Reading was one of just 35 schools nationally to be made a Microsoft Partner School.

In 2007, the school was identified by the Sutton Trust as one of only 20 state schools among the 100 schools in the UK responsible for a third of admissions to Oxford and Cambridge Universities over the five preceding years. 16.0% of pupils went to Oxbridge and a 62.1% in total went to universities identified by the Sutton Trust as "top universities". In July 2011, the school was further identified by the Sutton Trust as the third highest state school, and among the top 30 schools in the country, for proportion of higher education applicants accepted at Oxford and Cambridge Universities. The report found that 16.7% of pupils were accepted to Oxbridge and 81.5% were accepted to the highly selective Sutton Trust 30 universities over the previous three years.

Reading School was given the "State School of the Year" award by The Sunday Times newspaper in 2010 and 2019, in recognition of the school's academic achievements and community orientated ethos.

In 2025, a student from Reading School qualified for UK's National Mathematics Team after participating in the UKMC (United Kingdom Mathematics Challenge) and won honourable mention at the International Mathematical Modeling Challenge.

== Subjects taught ==
Subject	Taught at KS3	Taught at KS4	Taught at Sixth Form
Ancient History; Classical Civilisation	No	Yes	Yes
Art	Compulsory	Yes	Yes
Biology	Compulsory	Compulsory	Yes
Chemistry	Compulsory	Compulsory	Yes
Computer Science	Compulsory	Yes	Yes
Drama; Theatre Studies	Compulsory	Yes	Yes
Economics	No	Yes	Yes
Electronics	No	Yes	No
English	Compulsory	Compulsory (GCSE English Language and GCSE English Literature)	Literature only
French	Compulsory in Year 7^{[1]}	Yes^{[2]}	Yes
Geography	Compulsory	Yes	Yes
German	Compulsory in Year 7^{[1]}	Yes^{[2]}	Yes
History	Compulsory	Yes	Yes
Latin	Compulsory^{[2]}	Yes^{[2]}	Yes
Mandarin Chinese	Yes ^{[1]}	Yes	No
Mathematics^{[3]}	Compulsory	Compulsory	Yes (A-Level Mathematics and Further Mathematics offered)
Music	Compulsory	Yes	Yes
Philosophy; Religious Studies	Compulsory (as Religious Studies)	Compulsory^{[4]}	No
Physical Education	Compulsory	Yes^{[5]}	Yes^{[5]}
Physics	Compulsory	Compulsory	Yes
PSHE^{[6]}	Compulsory	Compulsory	Compulsory
Spanish	Compulsory in Year 7^{[1]}	Yes^{[2]}	Yes
Floreat (Student Leadership)^{[6]}	Compulsory	Compulsory	No

1. French, German, Spanish and Latin are compulsory in Year 7, while Mandarin can be chosen to replace a language except Latin. In Year 8 students must take 2 modern languages and Latin.

2. At least one ancient or modern language must be taken for the GCSEs.

3. Additional Maths is taken by the top four sets at the same time as their GCSEs. Further Maths is optional at A Level, with some students being able to take it in one block with Maths.

4. The top half of the year take an externally-assessed AS-level Philosophy exam at the end of Year 11. Those who score a B or higher can either opt-out of the subject, continue onto the A2 or redo the exam the following year. Those who didn't score a B or higher can redo the exam the following year.

5. In the sixth form, P.E. can optionally be taken as an examined A-Level. Those that do not do this must still take part in games weekly, though this is not examined or graded in any way, or must take part in Community Service during Games lessons. In Years 10 and 11, certain students are given the option of taking the GCSE as an additional subject. All students must complete Games lessons.

6. Not examined.

== See also ==
- List of the oldest schools in the United Kingdom
- List of the oldest schools in the world
- Reading Abbey Girls' School
- List of English and Welsh endowed schools (19th century)
- List of international schools in China
