= Greyfriars Church, Reading =

Greyfriars Church
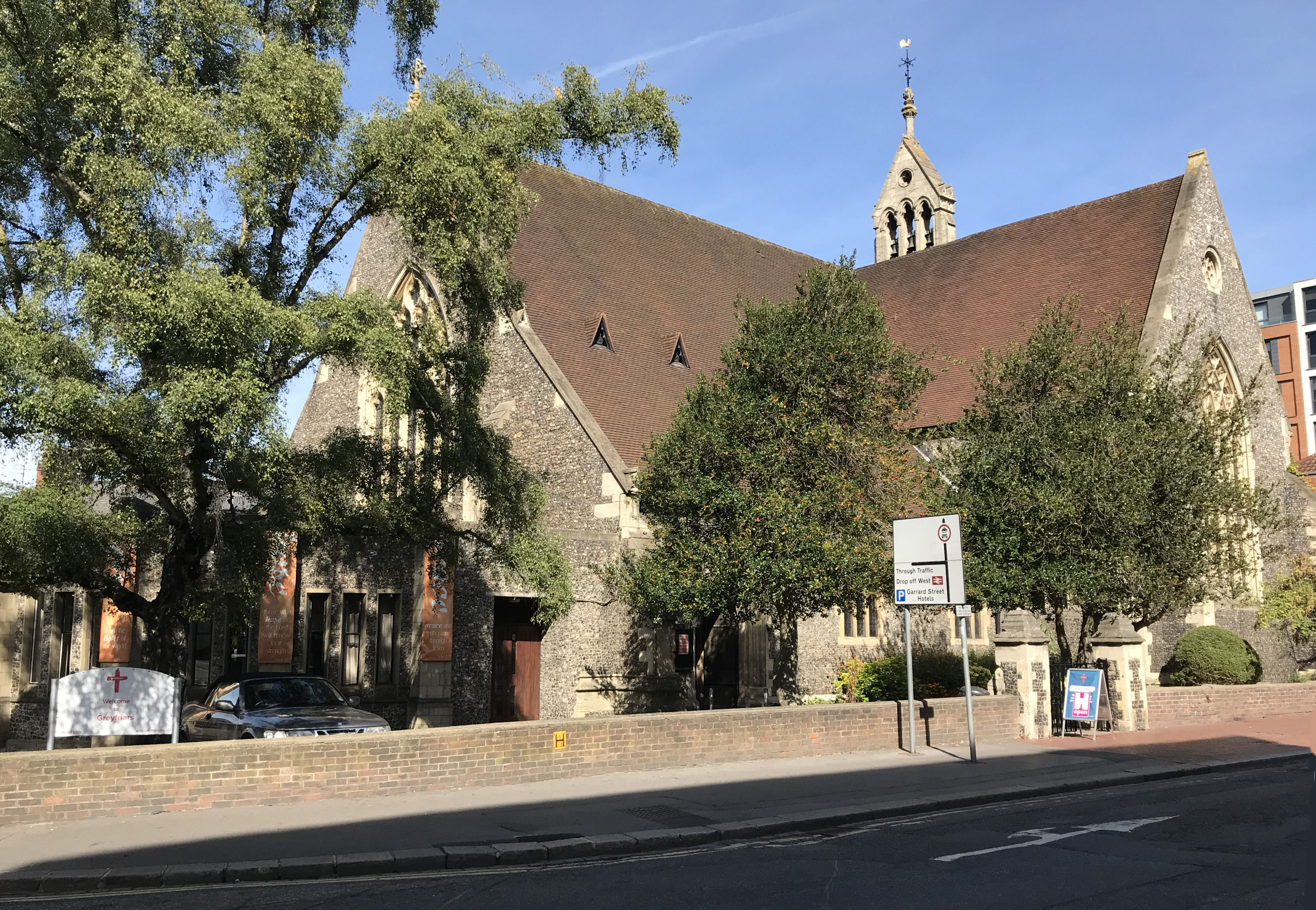
- Greyfriars' Church on Friar Street

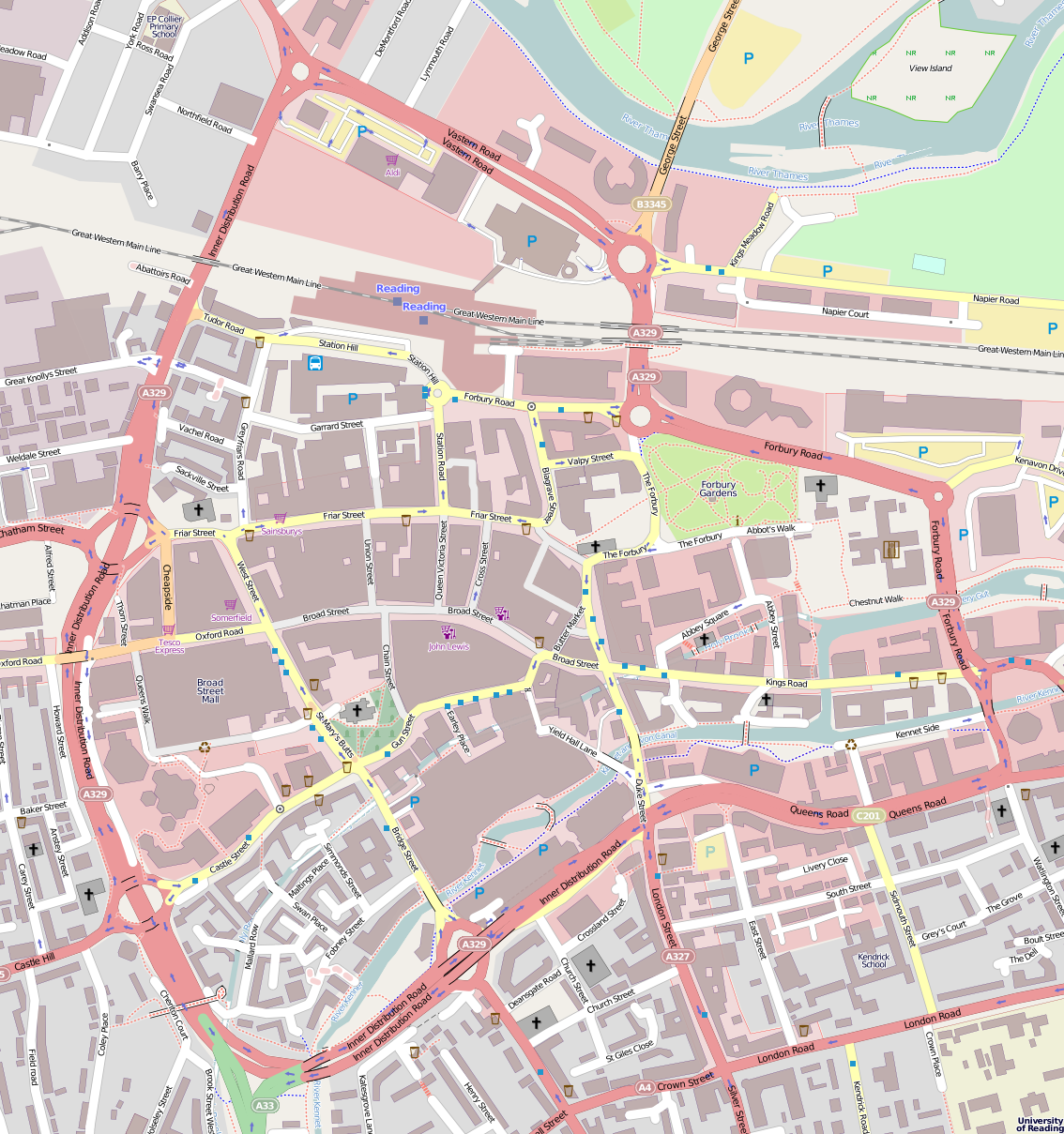
- Location within Reading Town Centre
- 51°27′24.38″N 0°58′35.52″W
- Location: Reading, Berkshire, England
- Denomination: Anglican
- Website: Greyfriars Church website

History
- Former name: Franciscan friary

Architecture
- Heritage designation: Grade I
- Years built: 1311

Administration
- Diocese: Diocese of Oxford

Greyfriars Church is an evangelical Anglican church, and former Franciscan friary, in the town centre of Reading in the English county of Berkshire. The church forms part of the Church of England's Diocese of Oxford.

It is the oldest Franciscan church still in use as a place of worship in the UK, and is said to be the most complete surviving example of Franciscan architecture in England. As a consequence, it has been listed as a Grade I listed building.

== History ==
=== As a friary ===
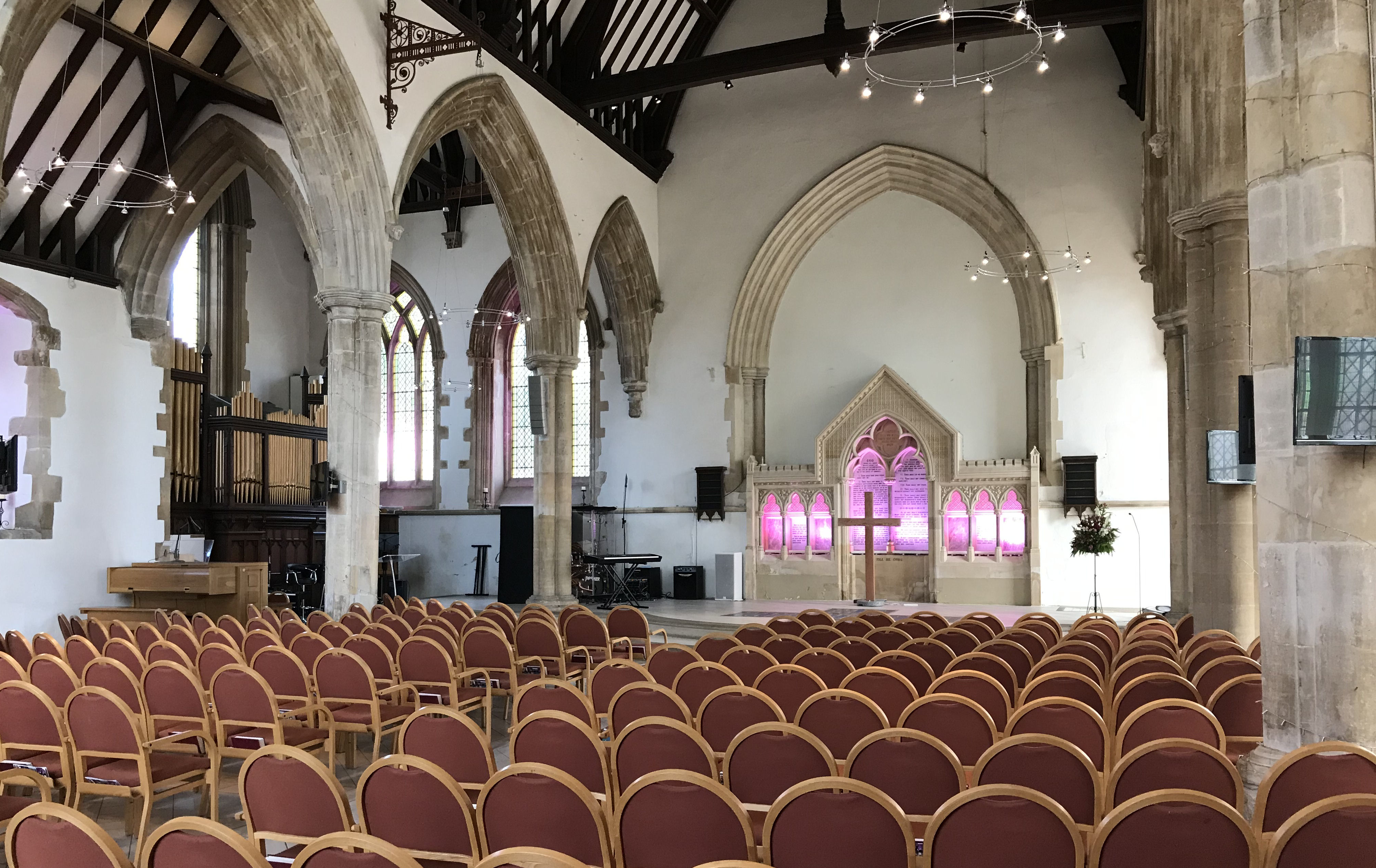
The nave looking East

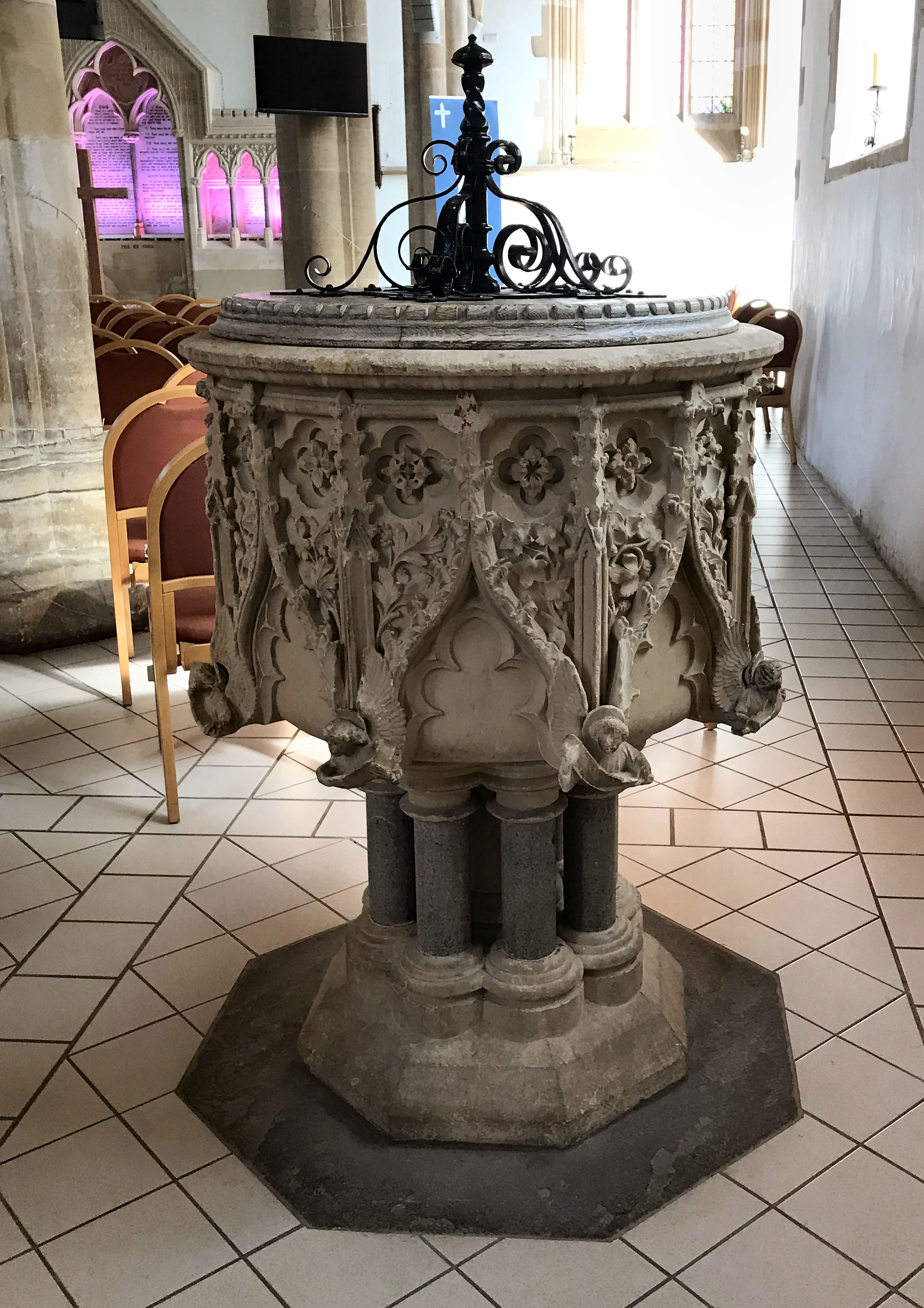
The Victorian baptismal font

The Franciscan order of friars first arrived in Reading in 1233 with the intention of creating a community to minister to the poor and the oppressed. This arrival was not welcomed by the established Reading Abbey, but the fact that the friars had royal patronage meant that Adam de Lathbury, the then abbot, was obliged to assist. Nevertheless the first mention of a painted altarpiece known in Europe comes from the friary, which is recorded as having "unam tabulam ad altarem depictam et auro stellatam" in 1239.

Initially the friars were granted a site alongside the road to Caversham Bridge, and by 1259 had erected a friary there, complete with church, chapter house, dormitory and refectory. However the site proved prone to flooding, impeding the ability of the friars to undertake their ministry. Eventually John Peckham, who was both the Archbishop of Canterbury and a fellow Franciscan, intervened and by 1285 a new site had been obtained at the west end of what is now Friar Street.

The new friary on the new site, that was eventually to become Greyfriars Church, was ready by 1311. The friars were expelled in 1538 as part of King Henry VIII's dissolution of the monasteries.

=== As a secular building ===
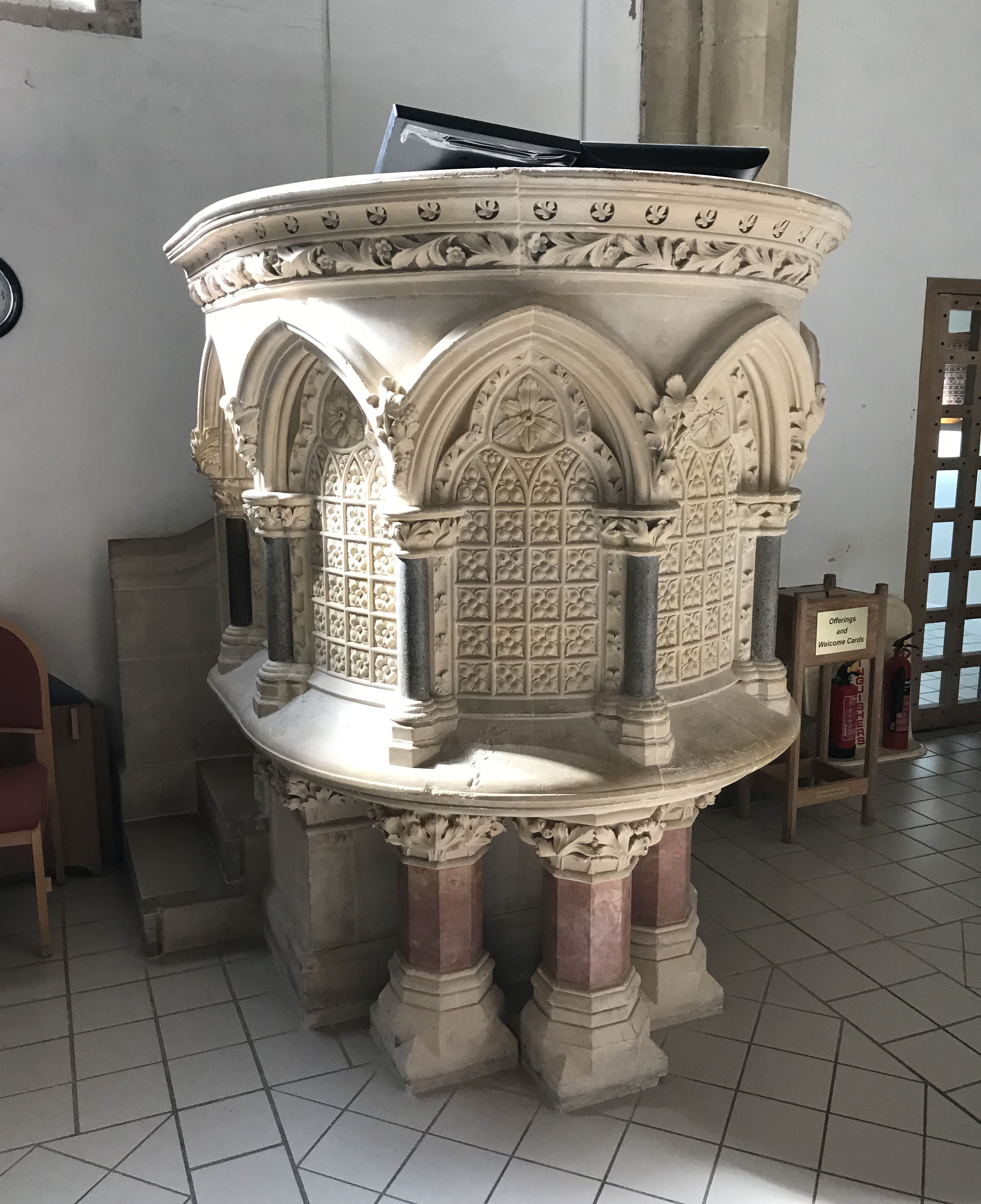
The Victorian pulpit

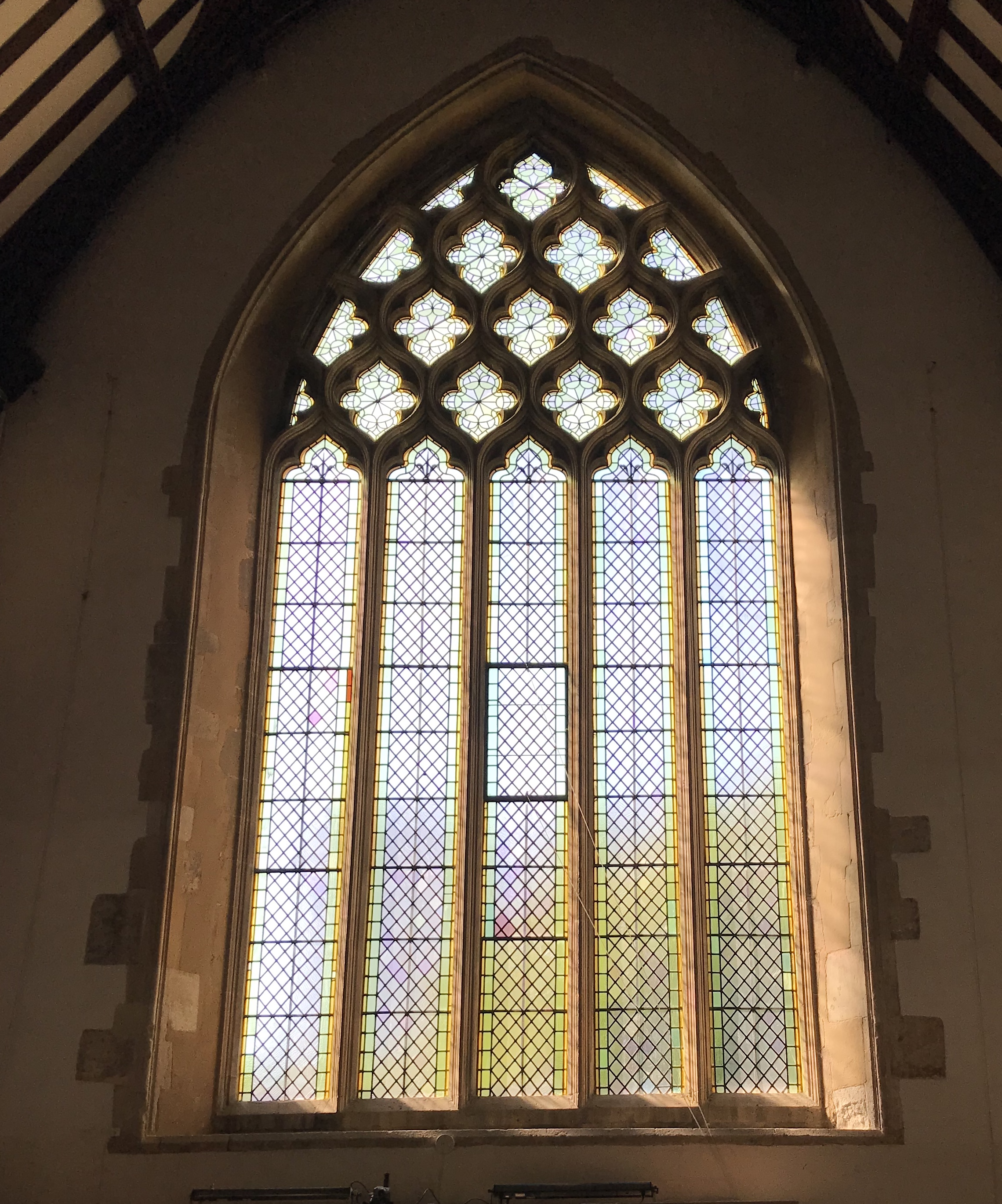
The West Window is of 5 lights in a decorated style with reticulated tracery

At the time of the dissolution, the town of Reading was administered from a guild hall known as the Yield Hall, situated beside the River Kennet close to today's Yield Hall Lane. However, by the middle of the 16th century this had proved too small. The mayor, along with Thomas Vachell of Coley Park, petitioned the king to grant the nave and aisles of the church for use as a town hall. In 1543, this petition was granted. The remainder of the church and friary, together with the adjoining grounds, were sold to Robert Stanshawe, after whom the nearby Stanshawe Road is named.

However Greyfriars did not prove a successful town hall, and some twenty years later the council created a new town hall by inserting an upper floor into the refectory of the Hospitium of St John, the former hospitium of Reading Abbey. This was to remain the site of Reading's civic administration, through the successive re-buildings that eventually created today's Reading Town Hall, until the move to Reading Civic Centre in the 1970s.

Thereafter Greyfriars was used successively as a hospital for the poor (1578) and a house of correction for the punishment of idle or vagrant people (1590). In the 18th century it became the town's jail. By the middle of the 19th century, only the walls survived, and the derelict structure was in danger of collapse.

=== As a parish church ===
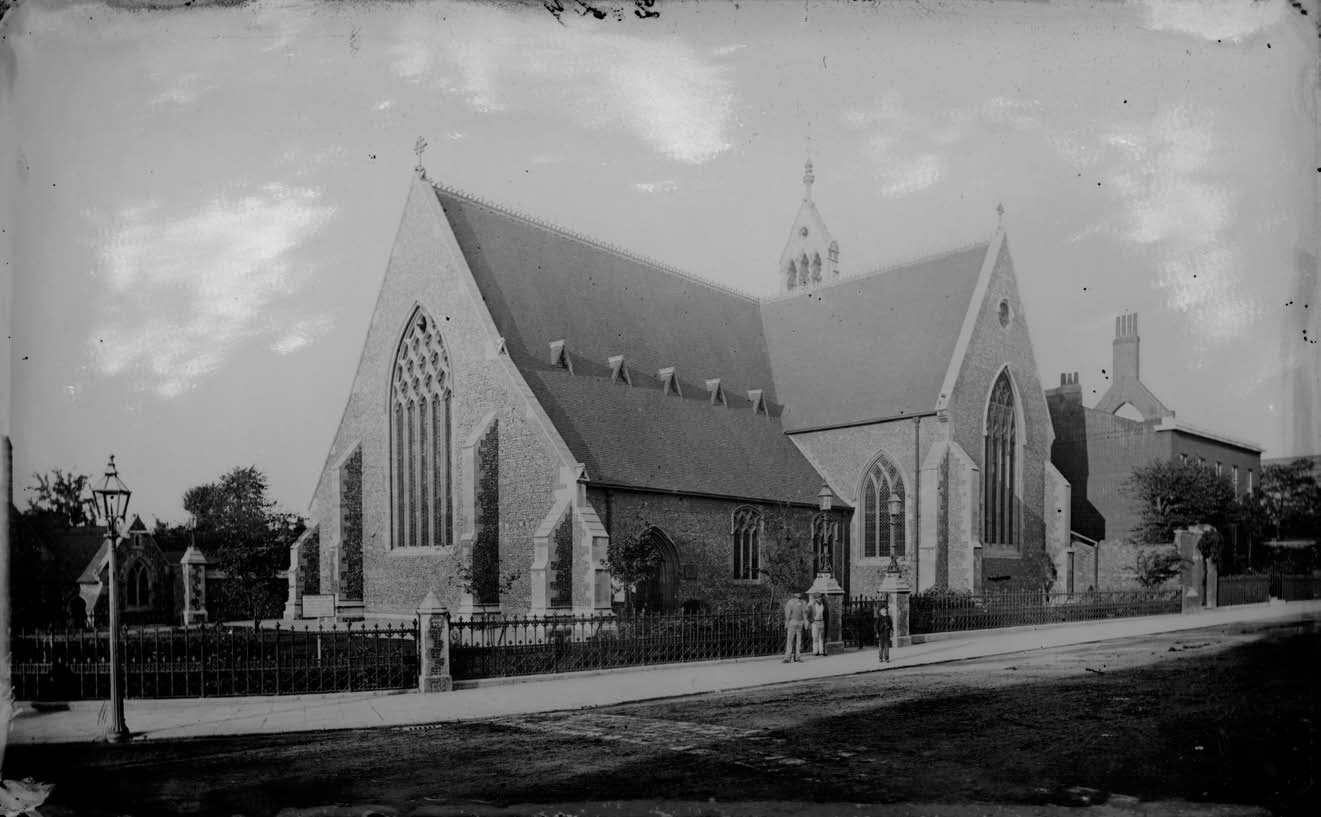
Greyfriars Church c. 1875 by Henry Taunt

The church was restored around 1863 by the Reading Borough Surveyor, W H Woodman. The original building is constructed from squared and knapped flints with a stone plinth and buttresses. The tiled roof sweeps down over aisles, and the church has a three bay nave. The large transept and triple arched belfry were added to the church by Woodman. The nave has segmental headed 3 light windows of plain decorated style and an extremely fine west window of 5 lights, in a decorated style with reticulated tracery. The interior is spacious, with a crown post and wind brace roof supported on original cruciform and quadriblobe shafts. The font and pulpit date from the restoration.

The Memorial Hall, a building seating about fifty opens both to the north side of the Church and to Sackville Street, was constructed in the early twentieth century. It can be divided into three rooms.

The Vicarage building was re-built in 1961–62 with the outward appearance of the original Georgian town house, but with a modern interior. It has now been purchased from the diocese, together with its garden, by the congregation of Greyfriars to be used for the mission of the church, initially as a Day Nursery.

Attached to the main church building is the West End, which was constructed in the 1970s to create an entrance foyer and a semi-circular lounge with seating for 100–150. Movable screens allow for it to be divided into four smaller areas. There are also a small kitchen and toilets. The Greyfriars Centre, adjacent to the Church, was completed in 1983 and consists of a general purpose hall for sports and other activities, a coffee lounge with kitchen, bookshop, two meeting rooms, the Church office, toilets and showers.

In 2000, the church's interior was reordered and modernised. The Victorian pews were replaced with movable seating to allow greater flexibility in the building's use, such as the large dinners which launch the church's Alpha Courses. The pulpit was moved to the rear of the nave. A baptistery was also installed.

== See also ==
- List of English abbeys, priories and friaries serving as parish churches
