= The Hexagon =

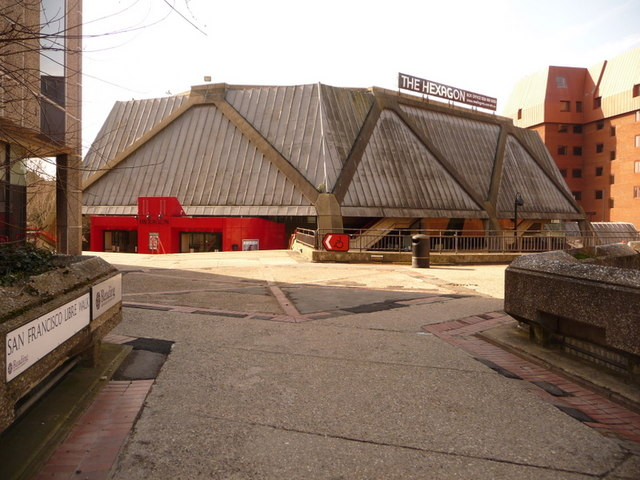
- View of The Hexagon from San Francisco Libre Walk

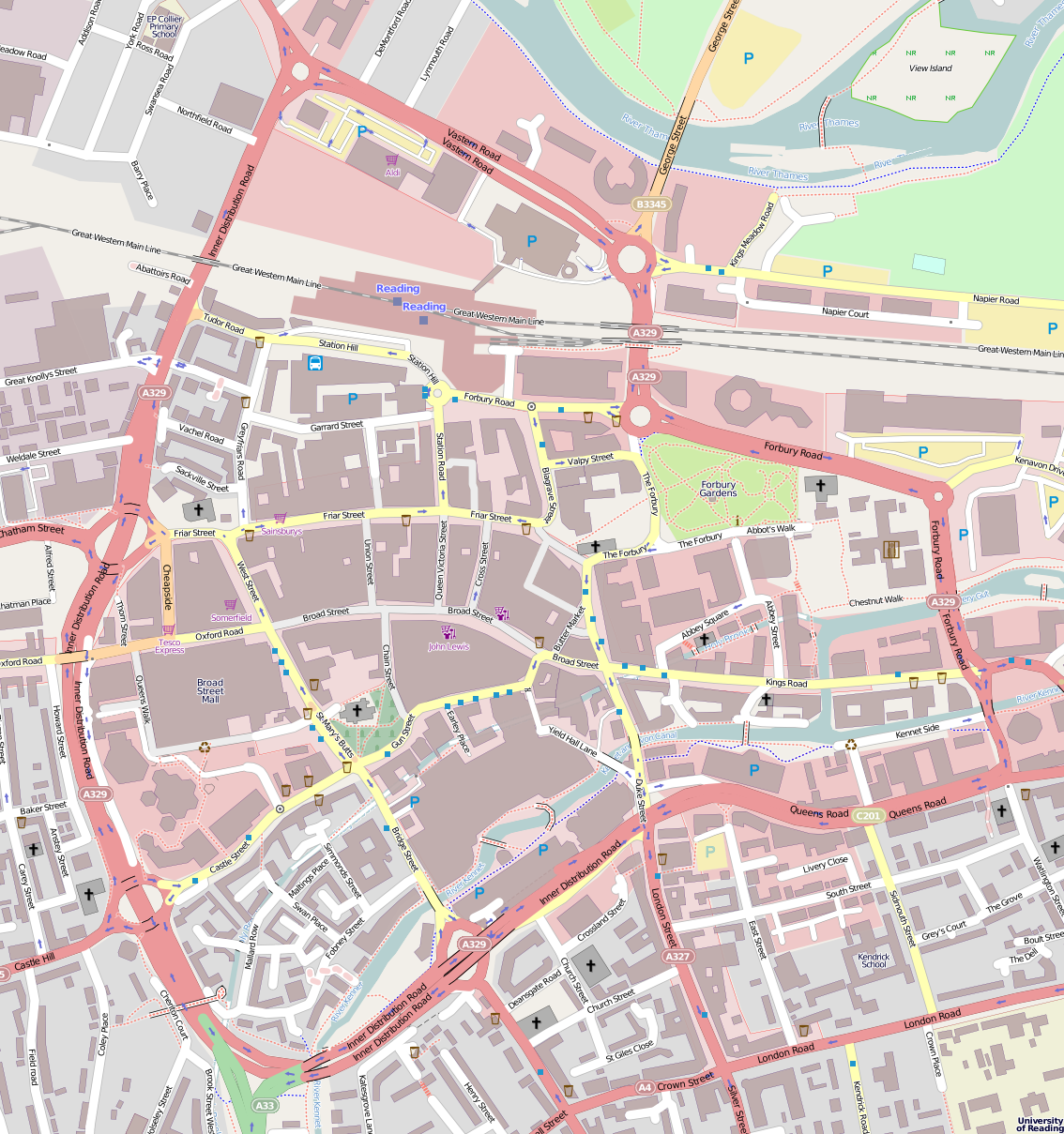
- Location within Reading Central

General information
- Type: multi-purpose arts venue and theatre
- Location: Queens Walk, Reading, Berkshire, United Kingdom, RG1 7UA
- Coordinates: 51.4539°N 0.9778°W
- Construction started: 1977; 49 years ago
- Inaugurated: First performance 'The Gondoliers' performed by The Sainsbury Singers on 7 November 1977
- Owner: Reading Borough Council

Design and construction
- Architect: RMJM

Other information
- Seating capacity: 1,200 seated 1,686 standing and seated

Website
- whatsonreading.com/.../hexagon/...

The Hexagon is a multi-purpose theatre and arts venue in Reading, Berkshire, England. Built in 1977 in the shape of an elongated hexagon, the theatre is operated by Reading Borough Council under the name "Reading Arts and Venues" along with South Street Arts Centre and Reading's concert hall.

== Architecture ==
The theatre was built in 1977 by Robert Matthew Johnson Marshall (RMJM), who also built the adjacent Civic Centre. The original design featured a proscenium but no fly tower. Upon opening, the venue was comparable to Derby's Assembly Rooms—which also opened in 1977—but the Hexagon was described as architecturally and acoustically superior.

As the building was designed to operate as a multi-use venue, the arena-style seating was used to avoid limited visibility. This proved useful for sports such as snooker or boxing, but rendered a number of seats unusable during performances that utilised the proscenium. A review of the Hexagon's architectural design in a 1979 edition of the Architects' Journal surmised that dramatic performances were seen as a low priority in the design—despite an estimated quarter of all events being of this type.

The stalls, which use removable and retractable seats, have less headroom than the balcony above. This results in shallow overhangs. The theatre floor, which usually holds stall seating, is adjustable to allow a contiguous service with the stage, providing a 517 square metres (5,560 sq ft) surface. The balconies, which are separated by gaps around the auditorium, are similar to those at Christchurch Town Hall in New Zealand. Similarly, the inclined panels around the room—to introduce reflections—may have been inspired by that venue.

The venue allows a number of different seating configurations, which affect the capacity. For performances with a proscenium arch, the capacity is 946. This increases to 1,200 for an all-seated concert and 1,686 for standing with balcony seating. The various seating arrangements affect the auditorium volume—8,280 cubic metres (292,000 cu ft) and 5,720 cubic metres (202,000 cu ft) respectively for music and drama performances, as well as the reverberation times—1.1 seconds for concerts and 0.9 seconds for drama. The theatre's diameter is roughly 30 metres (98 ft).

In July 2025, work began on adding the new Studio Theatre. It will have a capacity if 200 for seated events, and, by removing the seating, 300 for standing events. The Studio Theatre is set to open in the spring of 2027.

In April 2026, The Hexagon received £2.06 million in funding from Arts Council England. The funding will be used to replace the seating and fire doors, as well as update the drainage system.

=== Acoustics ===
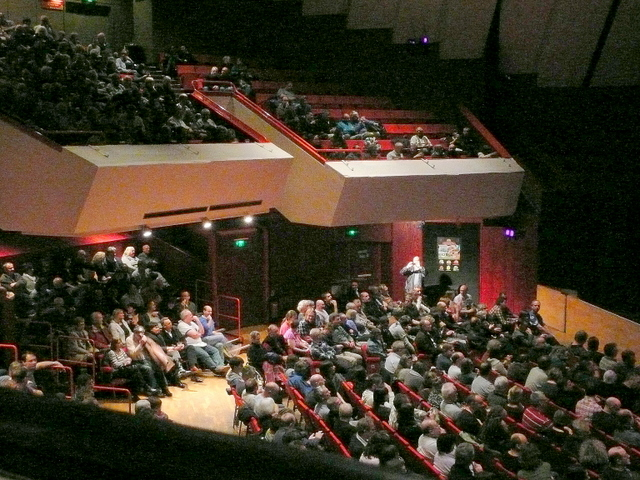
Inside the theatre

Originally, the Hexagon used an electronically assisted reverberation system; this has now been removed. In a review of the system, one author wrote that the system "seemed inaudible in the stalls but made a minor contribution in the balcony", concluding that it "still [left] an inadequate sense of reverberation." Acoustic panelling is used throughout the auditorium. The ceiling features rotatable acoustic screens to provide reflections to the balcony seats.

In acoustic tests performed by Sound Research Laboratories, the venue was found to have a short reverberation time—roughly one second in theatre configuration—which results in a high objective clarity. The assisted resonance system was found to increase this to 1.5 seconds at 200 Hz. The balcony seats have been described as having an inadequate level of early reflections and speech performance was judged to be poor. It has been concluded that rectifying the room's acoustics for the benefit of theatre and speech would be detrimental to other uses of the venue such as boxing.

Events include classical music, comedy, dance, drama, pop and rock concerts. In past years the venue has also been used for snooker.
