= Reading Town Hall =

Municipal building in Berkshire, England

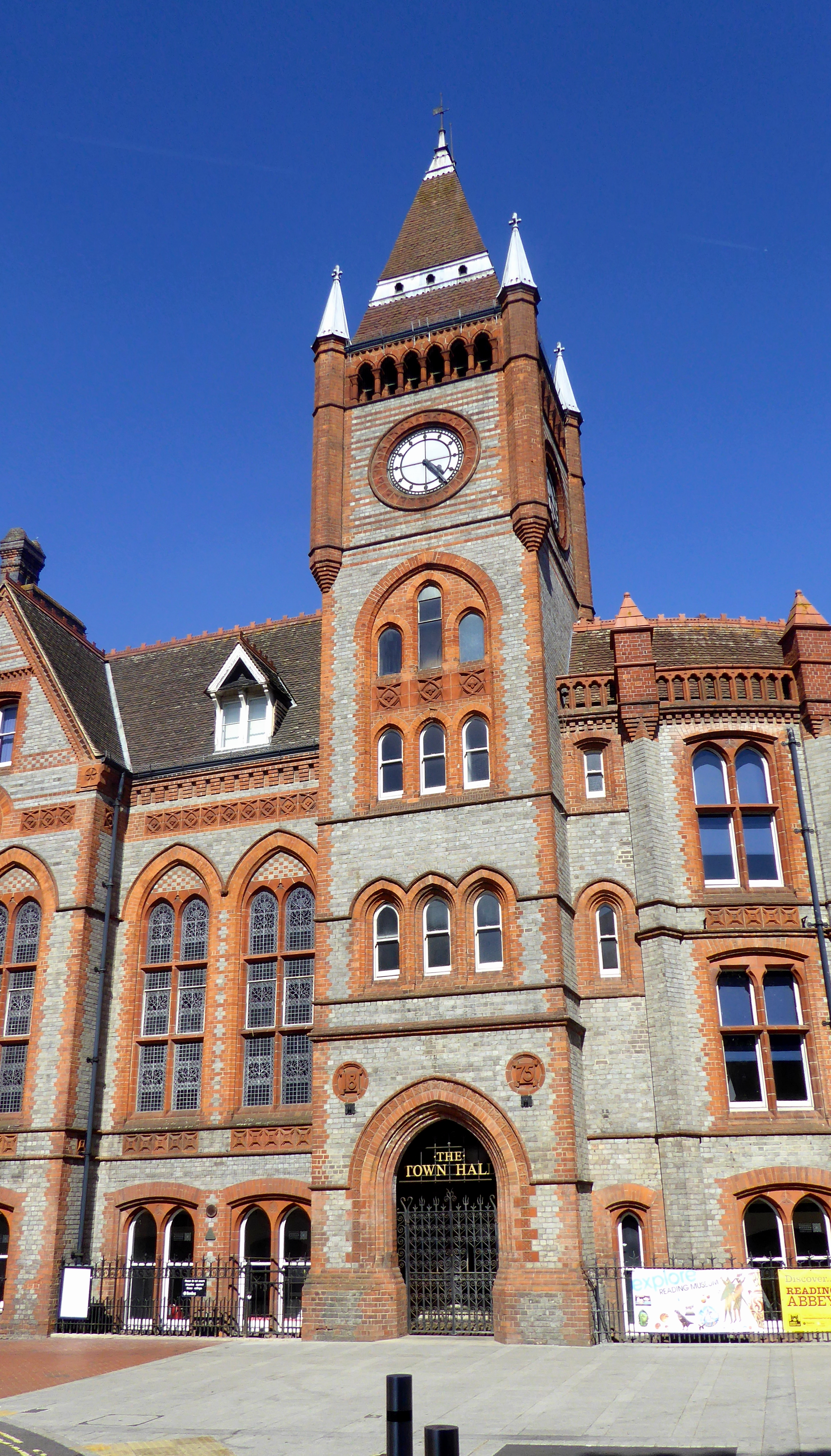
- The town hall in 2018

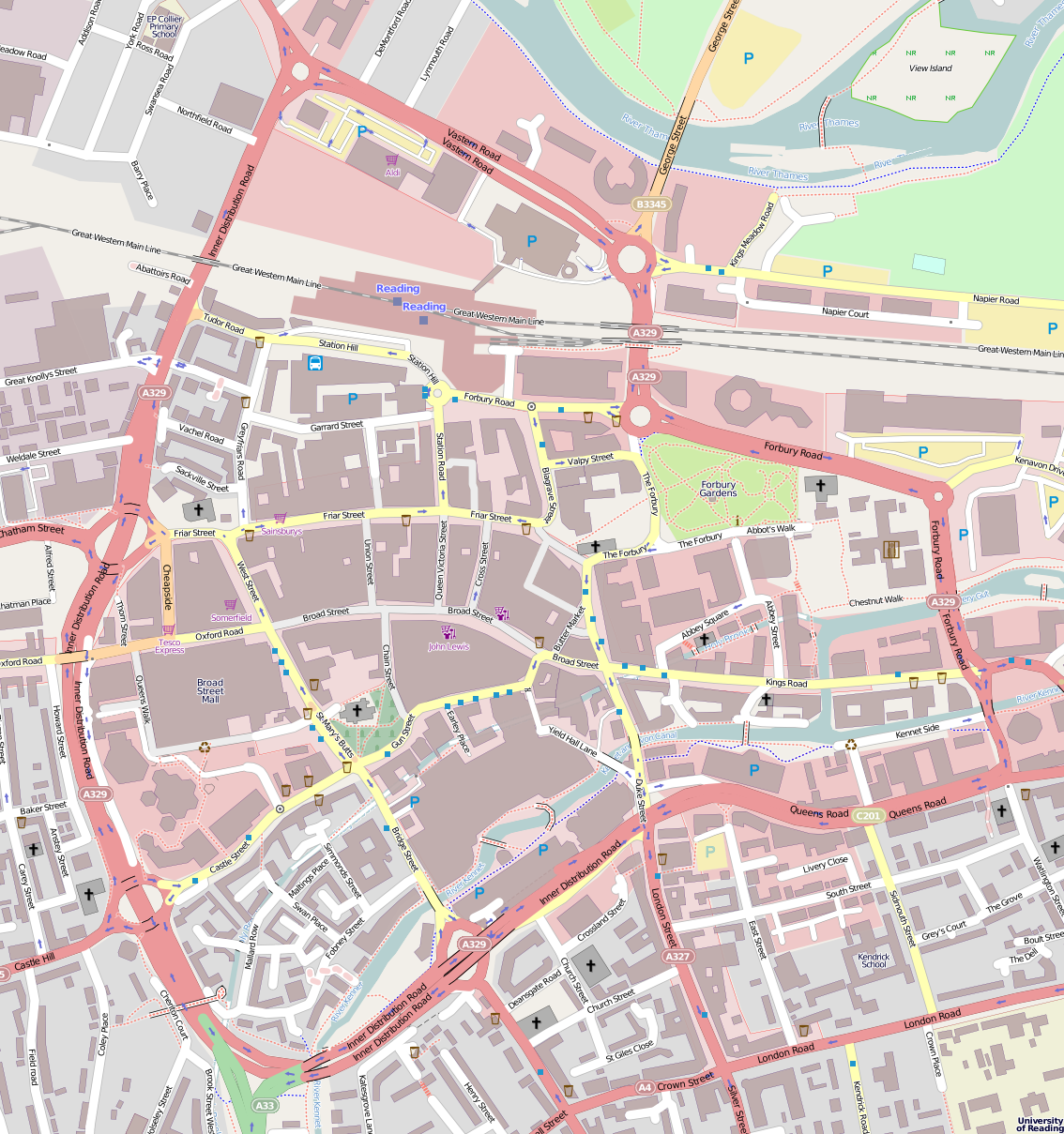
- Location within Reading Central

General information
- Type: Town hall
- Architectural style: Italianate
- Location: Reading, Berkshire, England
- Coordinates: 51.45695°N 0.97005°W
- Construction started: 1786
- Completed: 1875; 151 years ago

Design and construction
- Architect: Alfred Waterhouse

Listed Building – Grade II*
- Official name: Reading Town Hall
- Designated: 22 March 1957
- Reference no.: 1113400

Reading Town Hall is the town hall of Reading, Berkshire, England. The town hall was built in several phases between 1786 and 1897, although the principal facade was designed by Alfred Waterhouse in 1875. Situated close to the site of Reading Abbey, it is adjoined to the north by the Hospitium of St John and to the south by St Laurence's Church.

No longer the home of the town's administration, the Town Hall now houses the Reading Museum, a large concert hall, several smaller halls and conference rooms, a marriage ceremony room, and a public cafe. It is a listed building, with the block designed by Waterhouse being listed Grade II*, whilst other parts of the building are listed Grade II.

== History ==
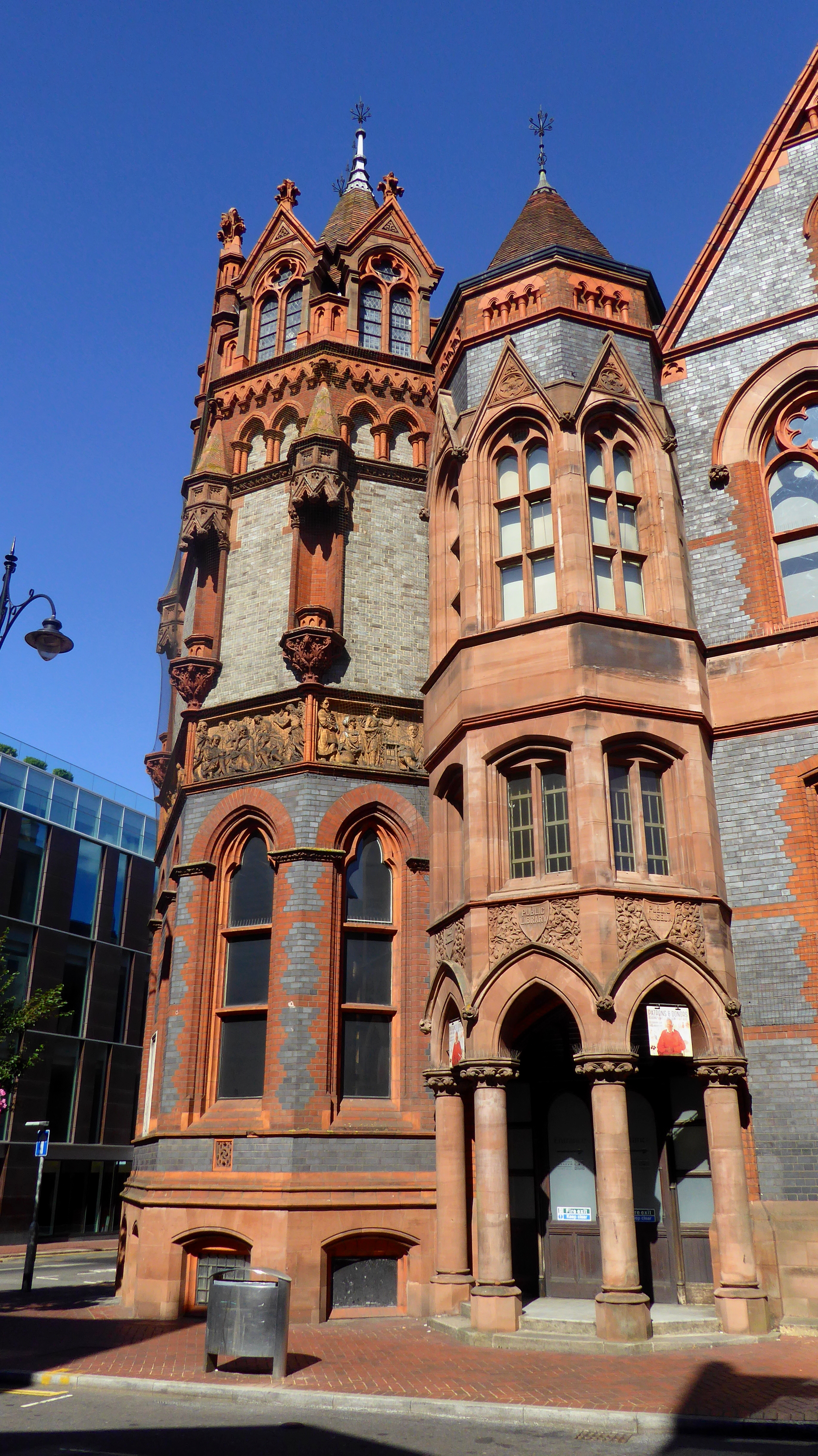
The northwest corner of the town hall

The first recorded town or guild hall for Reading was known as the Yield Hall and is known to have been situated beside the River Kennet near the current Yield Hall Lane. However, by the middle of the 16th century this had proved too small, and the spoils of the dissolution of the monasteries were to provide both of the town's next two halls. Initially, in 1543, the town was granted part of the former friary that was later to become Greyfriars Church.

However Greyfriars did not prove a successful town hall, and some 20 years later the council created a new town hall by inserting an upper floor into the former refectory of the Hospitium of St John, Reading Abbey's hospitium. The lower floor of this building continued to be used by Reading School, as it had been since 1486. For the next 200 years, the old monastic building continued to serve as Reading's town hall, but by the 18th century it was suffering from structural weakness.

Between 1785 and 1786, the old hall was dismantled and replaced on the same site by the first of several phases of building that were to make up today's Town Hall. This part of the building later became known as the Small Town Hall or the Victoria Hall, to distinguish it from the much later concert hall. The new hall was designed by Alderman Charles Poulton, a cabinet maker by trade, and is today largely hidden behind later extensions. The rear elevation and four sash windows with semi-circular tops can be seen from St Laurence's churchyard.

In 1864 the 1780s building was redecorated in an Italianate style by William Henry Woodman, the borough surveyor. At the same time an organ, built by Father Willis and presented by the Reading Philharmonic Society, was installed.

In 1875 an extension and new frontage was designed in Victorian Gothic style by the architect Alfred Waterhouse, involving partial demolition of the 1780s building but retaining the core hall. The new frontage was built with red and grey bricks, together with terracotta ornaments, all of which were products of the town's Colliers' brickworks. This extension added a council chamber and offices to the building, and the clock tower over its entrance (which is still a distinctive Reading landmark). The tower contained a clock and carillon by Gillett & Bland, which played 14 different tunes on ten bells.

Waterhouse was subsequently asked to design a further extension including a new concert hall, museum and library, but this was thought too expensive. Instead the council decided to hold a design competition, and this was won by Thomas Lainson with a design that continued Waterhouse's Gothic styling. Again an Italianate style was used for the interior, and Lainson designed a new Baroque style case for the organ, which was enhanced and relocated into the new concert hall. The concert hall opened in 1882, and was followed by the museum and library in 1883–4.

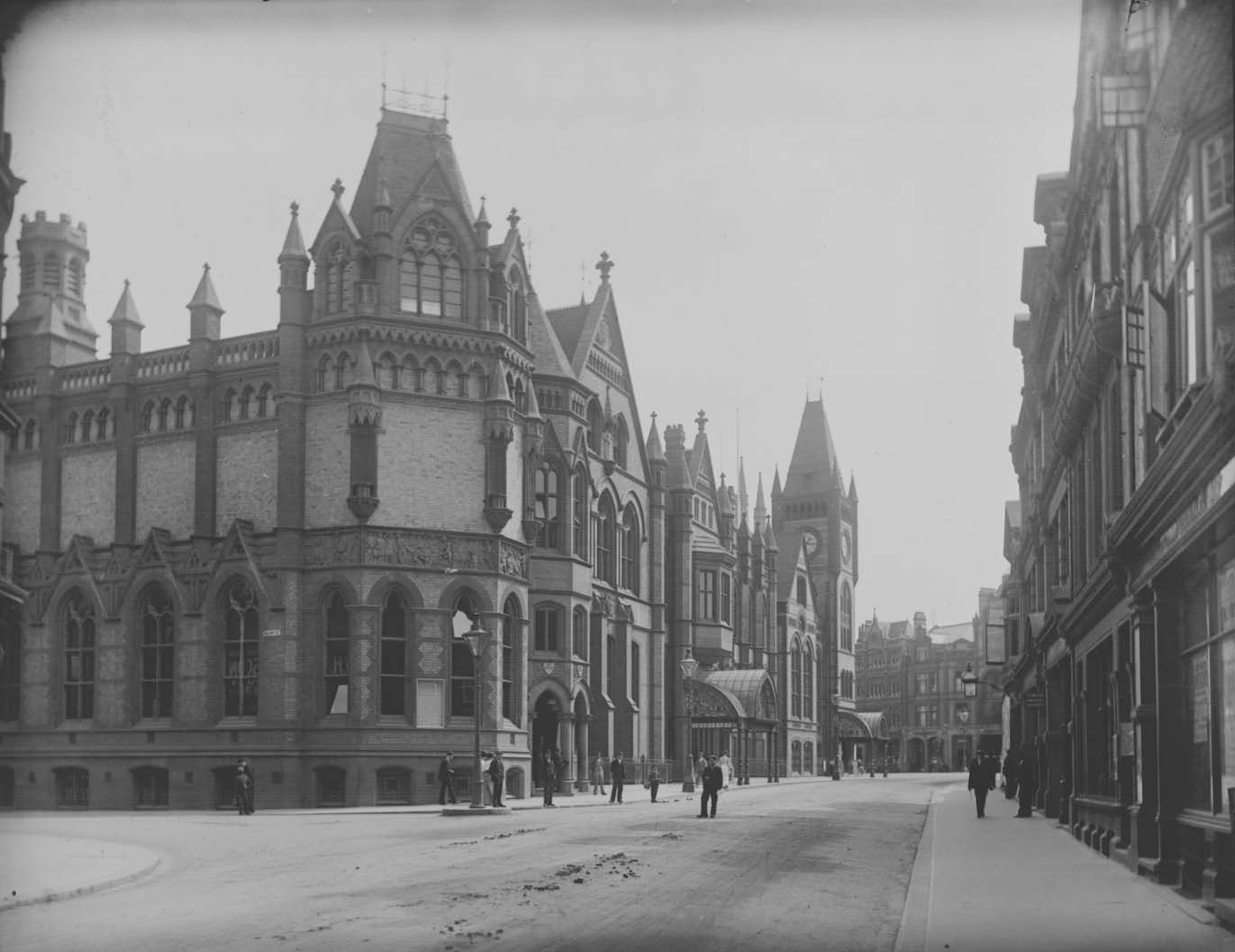
Reading Town Hall, c. 1900 by Henry Taunt. The far end is Waterhouse's work, the nearer work is by Lainson

A final extension opened in 1897 and contained an extension to the library and an art gallery. This was designed by William Roland Howell, and includes the frontage on Valpy Street. In 1943 during the Second World War, the southern end of the building suffered serious damage during an air raid. The scars of this attack remained visible until restoration work was carried out some 50 years later. A gala ball and a cabaret were held in the town hall that year as part of the borough's fund raising efforts for Wings for Victory Week.

By 1951 the administration of the town had overflowed the available offices in the Town Hall, and the council decided to build new civic offices. Finally in 1976, the civic offices moved out to the newly built Reading Civic Centre. In 1985 the library moved to a new central library building on King's Road, leaving only the museum and concert hall in use. After some debate, plans to demolish the Town Hall and replace it with a new cultural centre were dropped, and in 1986 refurbishment of the building started with the closure of the concert hall. The refurbishment was completed in 2000, bringing the concert hall back into use and providing several new galleries for the museum and art gallery.

== See also ==
- Grade II* listed buildings in Berkshire
