= Hospitium of St John the Baptist =

Hospitium of St John
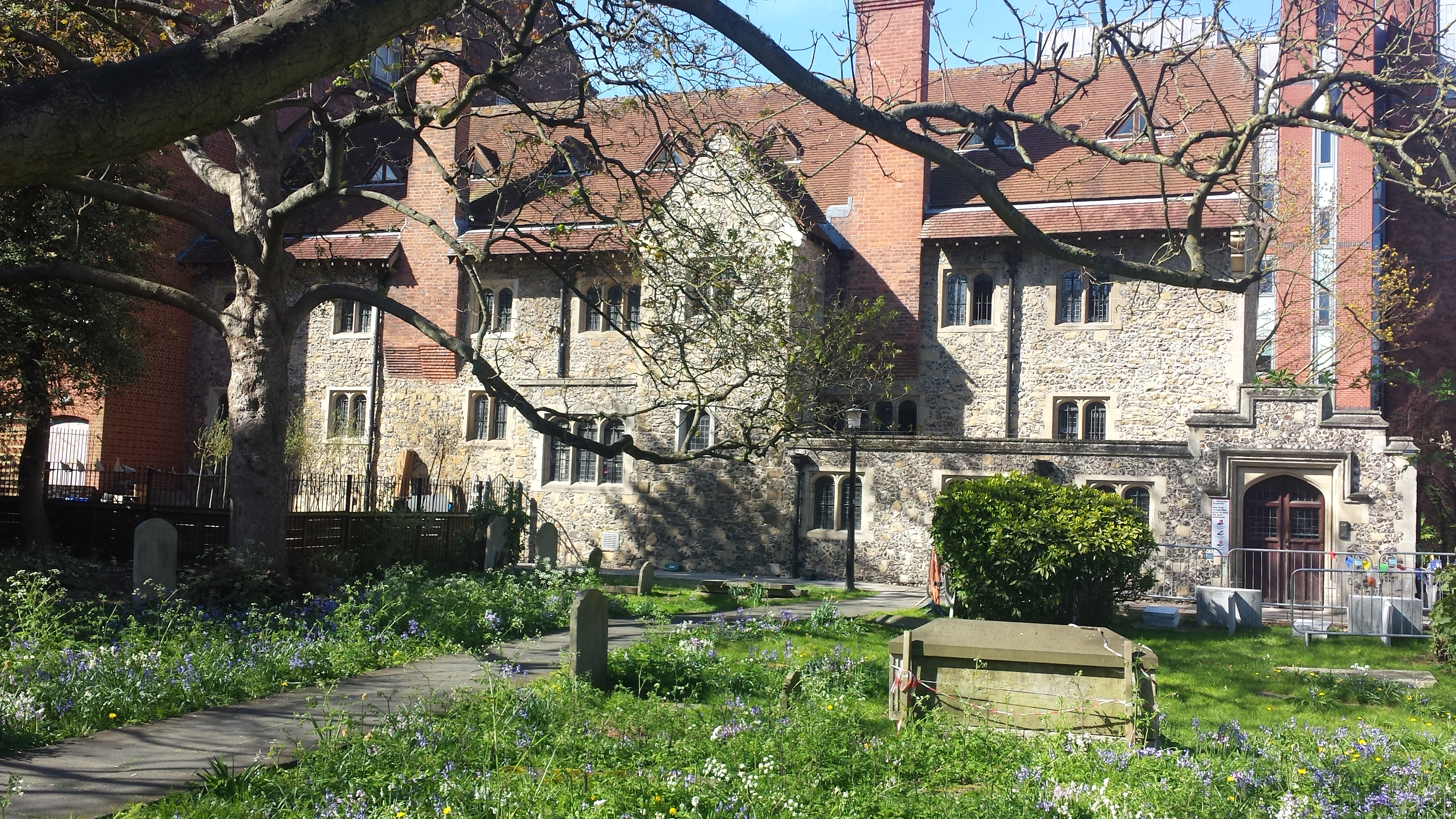
- The former main building of the hospitium

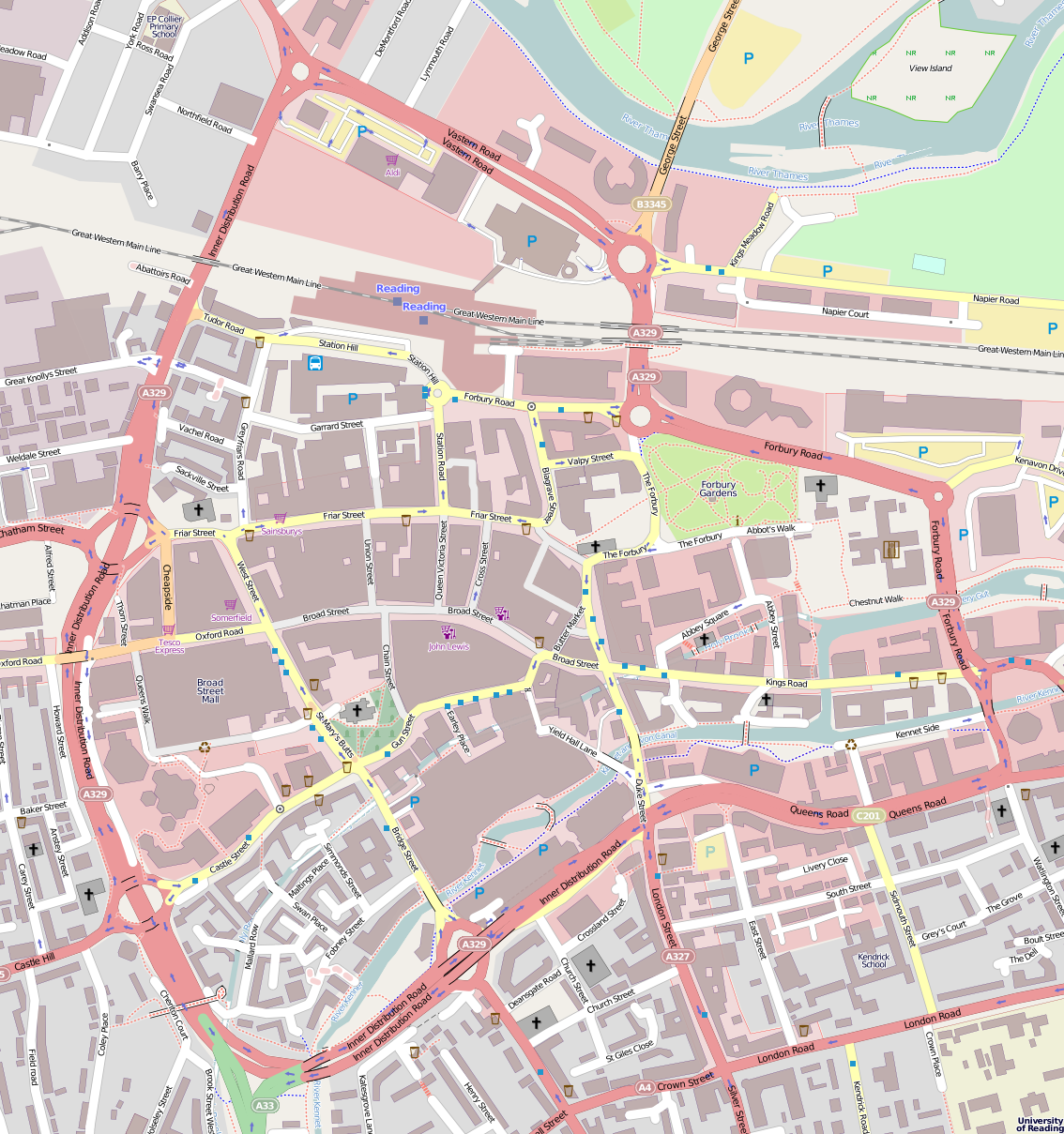
- Location within Reading Central
- 51°27′25.0″N 0°58′09.3″W
- Type: Hospitium

History
- Built: 1189 / 1485

Listed Building – Grade II
- Official name: Municipal Buildings
- Designated: 22 March 1957
- Reference no.: 1113402

The Hospitium of St John the Baptist was the hospitium, or dormitory for pilgrims, of Reading Abbey, which today is a large, ruined abbey in the centre of the town of Reading, in the English county of Berkshire. The hospitium was founded in 1189, and at its maximum comprised a range of buildings that could accommodate 400 people. The main building of the hospitium has survived, and is grade II listed. Much of the remainder of the hospitium was located where Reading Town Hall now stands.

The abbey school, which was founded in 1125, moved into the hospitium in 1485 as the Royal Grammar School of King Henry VII. The surviving building probably dates from this date, albeit incorporating some of the earlier building. The abbey school still exists in the form of Reading School, a state grammar school, albeit in different buildings on a different site.

About 100 years after the abbey school occupied the hospitium, and after the dissolution of the monasteries, Reading town council created a new town hall by inserting an upper floor into the hospitium's refectory, leaving the lower floor to be used by the school. This was the home of the town's administration for about 200 years, but the old refectory building eventually became structurally unsound. Between 1785 and 1786, the refectory building was dismantled and replaced on the same site by the first of several phases of building that were to make up today's Town Hall. The main building of the hospitium survived this demolition, and various other uses followed.

In 1892 the College at Reading was founded in the hospitium building as an extension college of the University of Oxford. The college occupied the hospitium until it was given a site on London Road in 1904 by the Palmer family of Huntley & Palmers fame. In 1926 the college received a Royal Charter and became the University of Reading. More recently the hospitium has been incorporated into an office development, and is occupied by a children's nursery.

Today the surviving building occupies a rather isolated site, with no direct street access. It abuts the main concert hall of Reading Town Hall to the west, and the south of the building opens directly onto the churchyard of St Laurence's Church. The building is surrounded to the north and east by a modern office development, with a small intermediate courtyard.

== Gallery ==
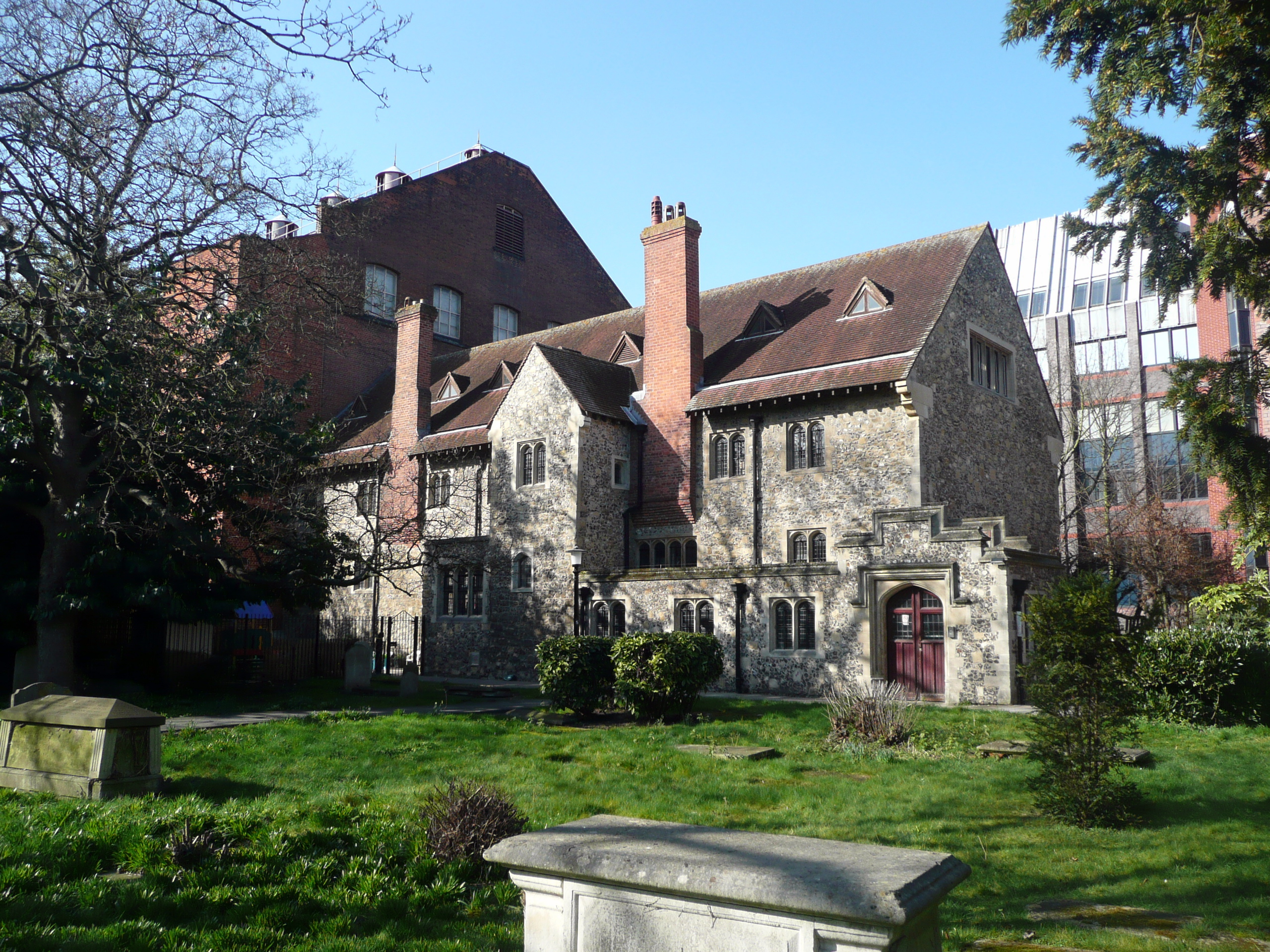
The Hospitium seen from the churchyard, with Town Hall to left and office development behind

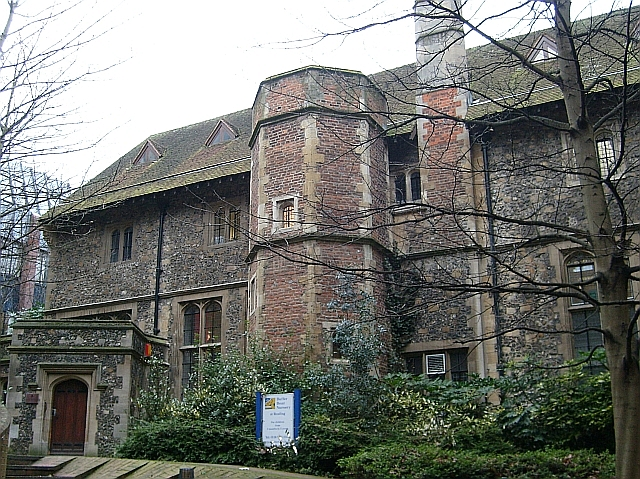
The north side of the Hospitium seen from the courtyard of the office development

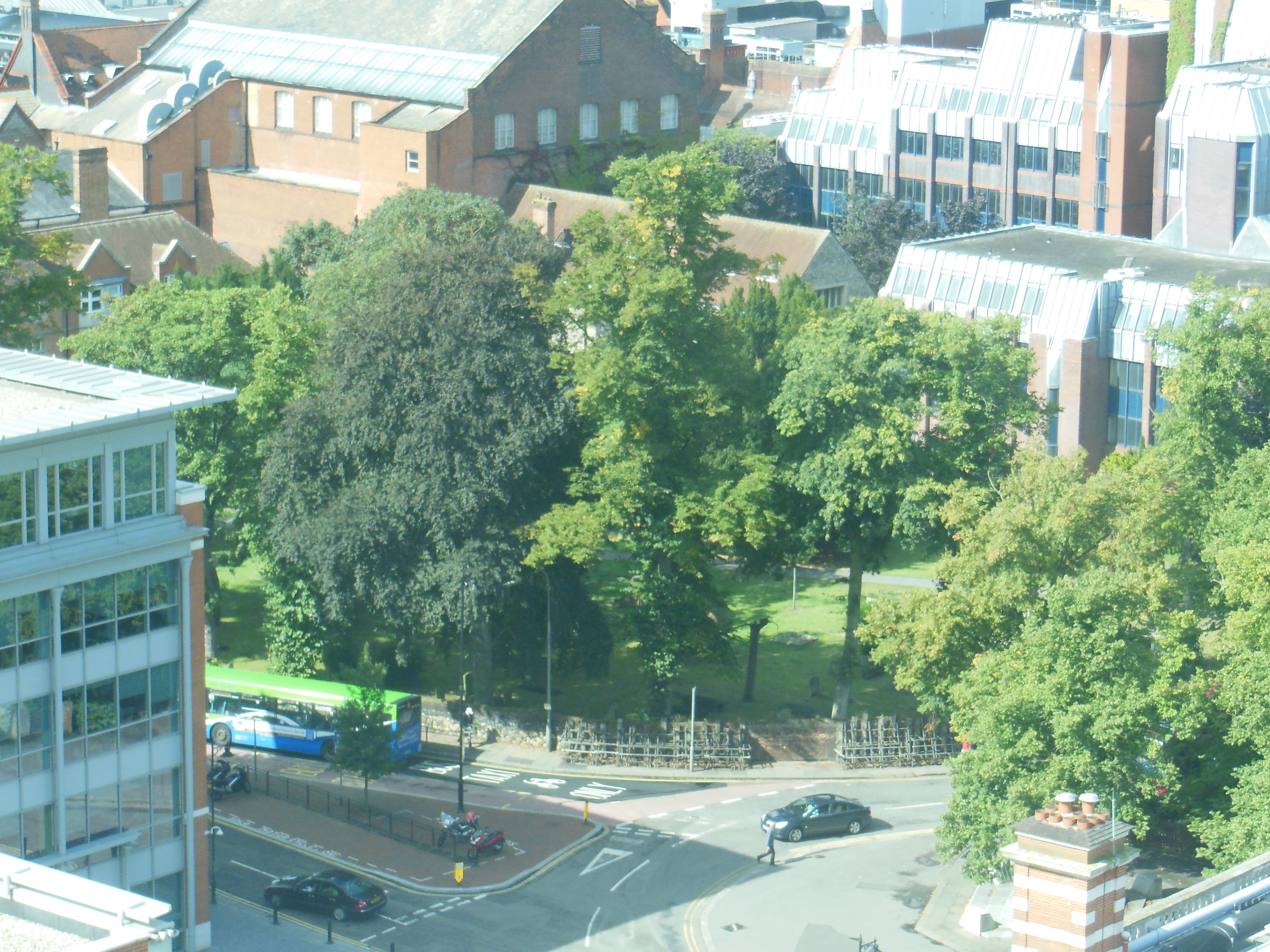
The roof of the hospitium is seen in the centre here, surrounded by churchyard, Town Hall and offices
