= St Laurence's Church, Reading =

St Laurence's Church
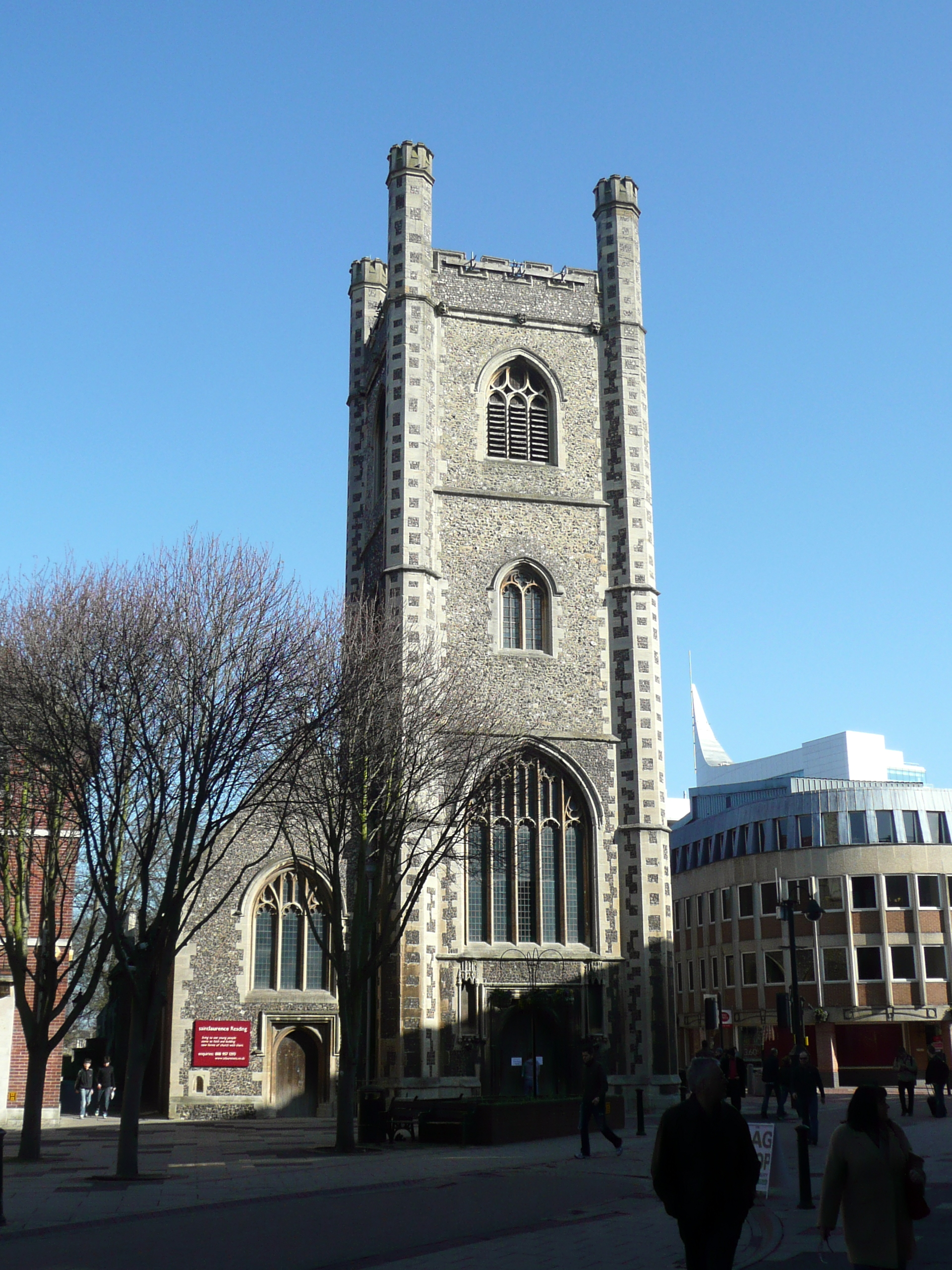
- St Laurence's Church with The Blade in the background

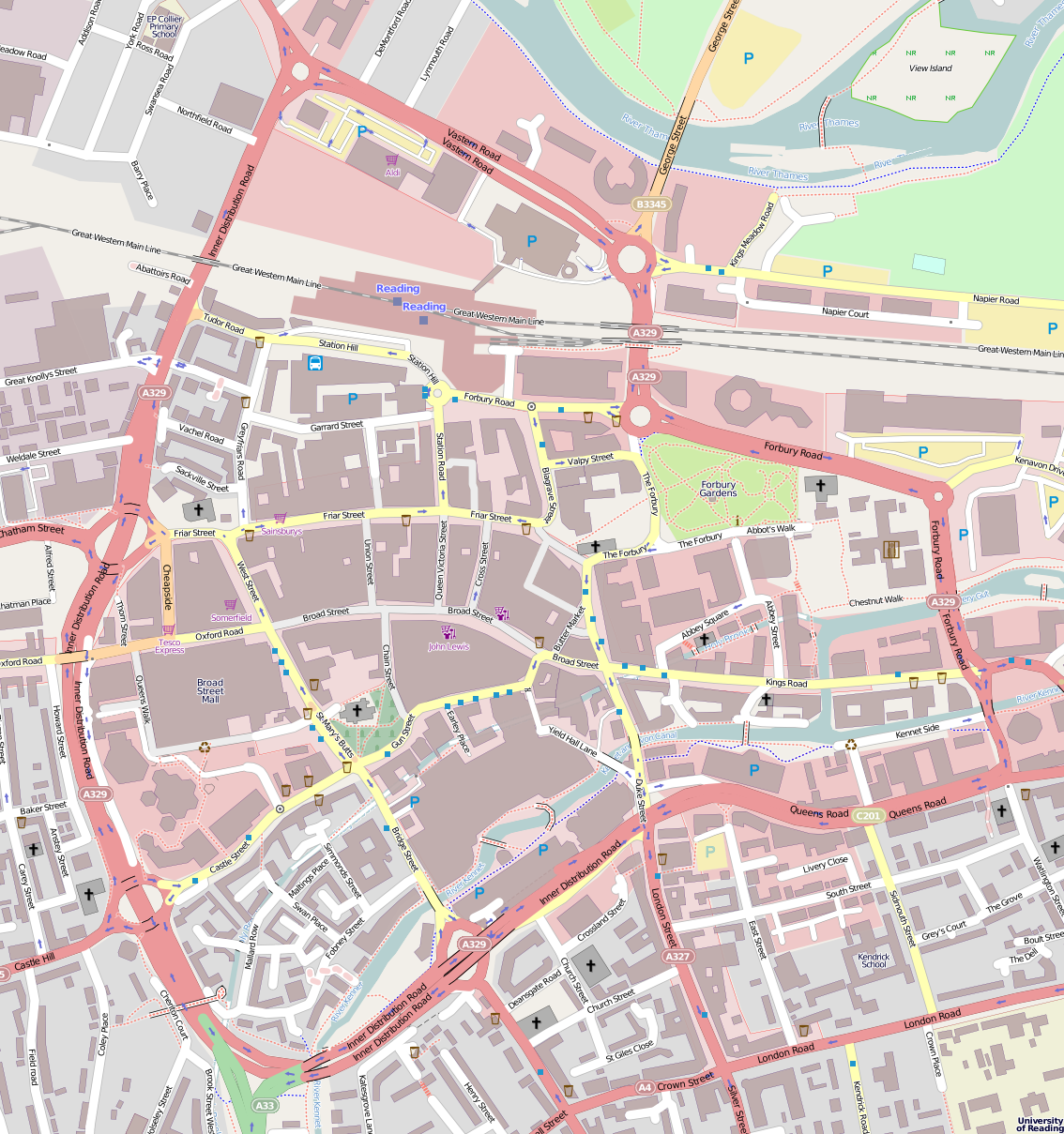
- Location within Reading Town Centre
- 51°27′23.59″N 0°58′10.01″W
- Location: Reading
- Country: England
- Denomination: Church of England
- Website: stlreading.org

History
- Founded: 1121
- Dedication: St Laurence

Architecture
- Functional status: Active
- Heritage designation: Grade I
- Style: Norman

Administration
- Diocese: Oxford
- Archdeaconry: Berkshire

Clergy
- Vicar: Rev. Chris Jones

St Laurence's Church is a Church of England mission and former parish church in the town of Reading in the English county of Berkshire. It is situated alongside the site of Reading Abbey, formerly bounded by the main Compter Gate to the south and the Hospitium of St John to the north. What was once the private chapel of the latter institution still remains in the north aisle. The church is a Grade I listed building.

== History ==
St Laurence's was one of the three original parish churches, along with St Mary's and St Giles', serving the medieval borough of Reading. It was built to serve the people of the eastern part of the town. Its location next to the Abbey stimulated trade in that part of the town and St Laurence's soon became surrounded by a large market place which included a pillory and stocks.

The church dates from the Norman period but underwent major rebuildings in 1196, in the 15th century and in 1867. The building is of flint with ashlar quoins. The principal feature of the church is a three-stage tower, built in 1458, which closes the vista to the north of Reading's old Market Place. The interior of the church contains several interesting items, including a memorial to John Blagrave, the 16th-century English mathematician, and a 1522 font used for the christening of Archbishop Laud. In 1619, a six-arched loggia known as Blagrave's Piazza was erected along the south wall in 1619. It had a small lockup under the furthest arch.

On 10 February 1943 the church was damaged by a bombing raid that killed 41 people. The damage can still be seen today.

=== Present ===
In the 1970s, a declining congregation meant that the parish of St Laurence was merged with that of St Mary's. Numbers continued to decline, and at the end of the 20th century it was decided to seek a new role for the church. The interior of the church was reorganised and a modern mezzanine floor inserted to one side of the nave. Today it serves as a mission church with a mandate to encourage the faith amongst young people.

== Gallery ==
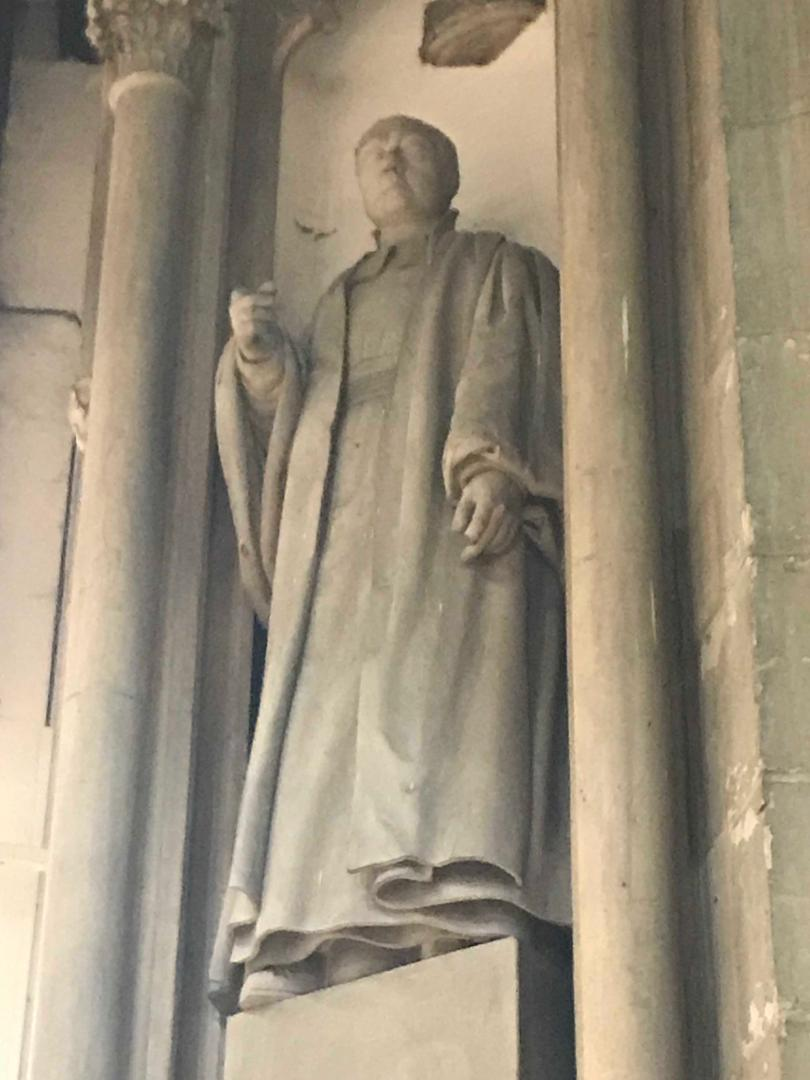
Richard Valpy by Samuel Dixon, St Laurence's Church, Reading (Roche Abbey stone)

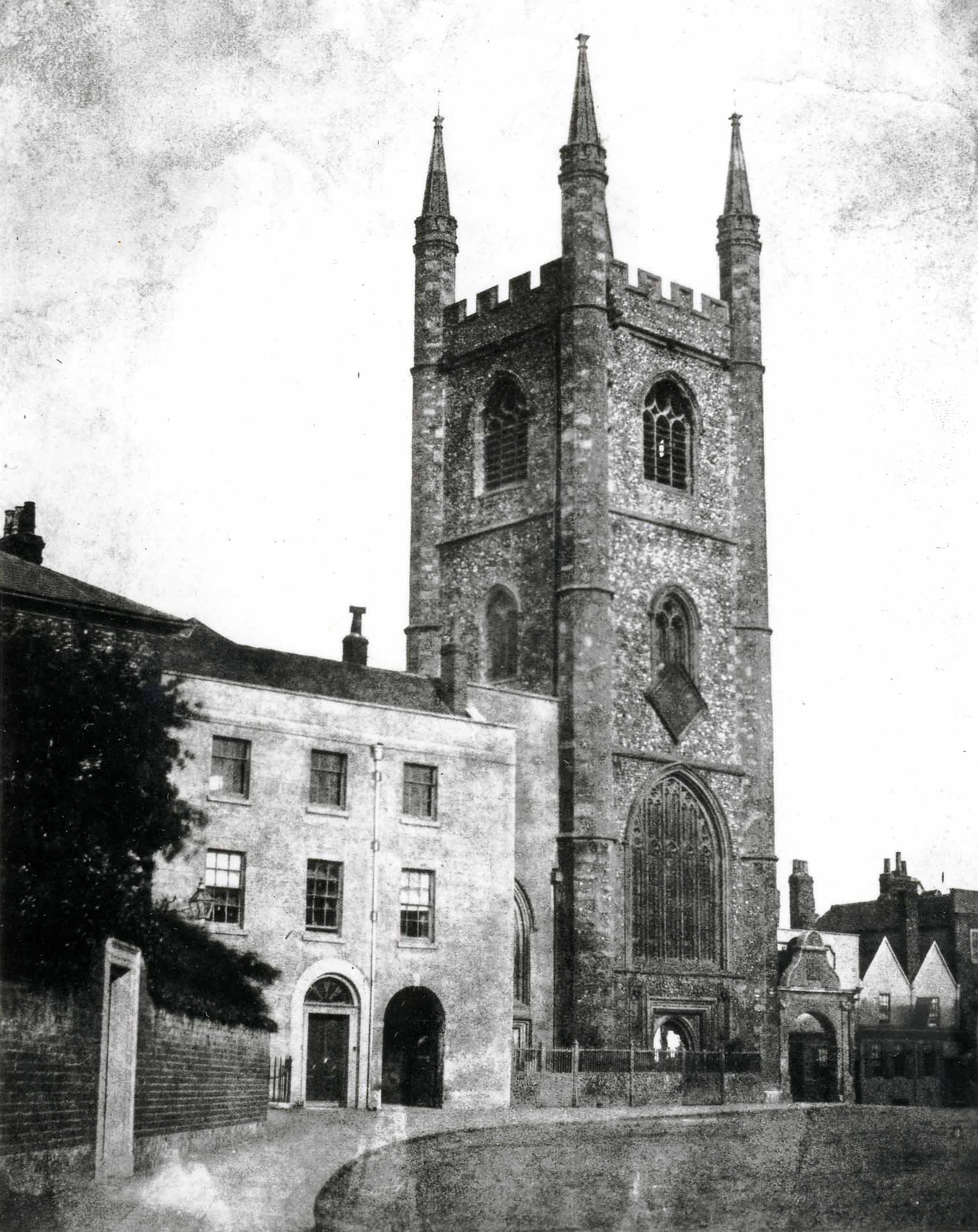
St Laurence's Church c. 1845 by William Fox Talbot
