= Reading Abbey Girls' School =

Historic boarding school in Reading, Berkshire, attended by Jane Austen

Coordinates: 51.45645°N 0.96679°W

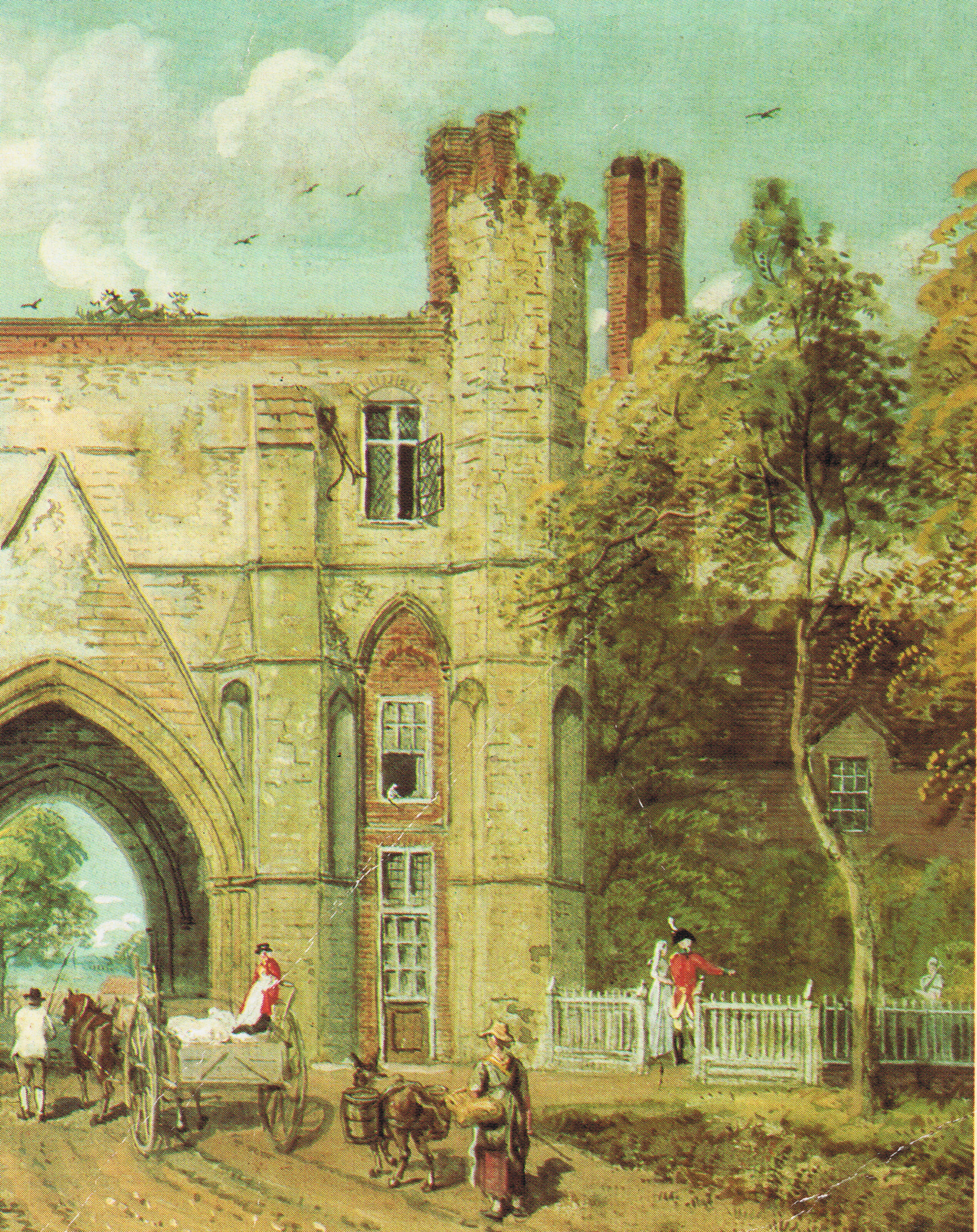
Reading Abbey Gateway by Paul Sandby (c.1730–1809)

Reading Abbey Girls' School, also known as Reading Ladies’ Boarding School, was an educational establishment in Reading, Berkshire open from at least 1755 until 1794. Many of its pupils went on to make a mark on English culture and society, particularly as writers. The most famous is Jane Austen, who used the school as a model of "a real, honest, old-fashioned Boarding-school".

== Abbey School, Reading ==
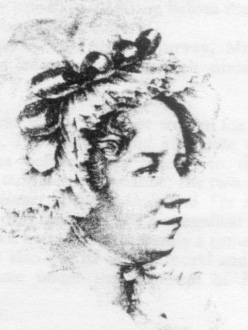
Mary Martha Sherwood

George Butt, sometime Chaplain-in-Ordinary to George III, sent his only son to his great friend Richard Valpy, headmaster of Reading School. On a visit to the town in 1790, he was favourably impressed by the girls' school, and decided to send his elder daughter as parlour boarder, a cut above the ordinary boarder. Mary Butt, later known as the prolific author Mrs Sherwood, devoted two chapters of her memoirs to her schooldays in the 1790s, giving a detailed portrait of life at this long-established boarding school.

Two buildings of Reading Abbey survived the Dissolution of the monasteries, the Hospitium, and the Inner Gateway. The latter, and a more modern building attached to it, housed the girls' establishment, which was thus known as the Abbey School or the Gateway School. (The Oxford Dictionary of National Biography calls it "Reading Ladies boarding-school".) It had its own garden, overlooking the open ground of abbey ruins known as the Forbury, where the boys played. The girls' school dates to before 1755, when Lydia Bell took on as assistant her half-sister Esther (later Sarah) Hackett, who later chose to call herself Mrs La Tournelle, despite being English and unmarried. Bell bequeathed the school to her sister, whose skills lay more as a housekeeper than a teacher. A Miss Pitts, who was there as a parlour boarder, went on to take partnership of the school.

Dr Valpy hired a French émigré, formerly a diplomat, Dominique de St Quentin (often spelled without the particle, and sometimes as Quintin). St Quentin and Pitts married, and took over management of the girls' school: "with his knowledge and ability [they] soon raised [its] standard and prestige". Teachers included Francois Pierre Pictet, formerly secretary to Catherine the Great, Empress of Russia, and her connection to Voltaire.

By the time the Butt sisters were there (Mary was joined the following year by her sister, later Lucy Lyttelton Cameron), the school had about 60 pupils, including three of the nine daughters of artist Philip Reinagle. It was expanding, from the ancient gatehouse to adjoining more modern buildings, giving the school new studies and dormitories. The girls were kept busy with rehearsals for "exhibitions" such as a play, in French, and a ball, featuring a quadrille. These performances, shared to some extent with the boys' school, were a good way to demonstrate to parents and prospective customers just what accomplishments they would be purchasing.

Jane Austen was the school's most famous pupil, attending with her sister Cassandra 1785–1786. She drew on her experiences there when writing Emma:

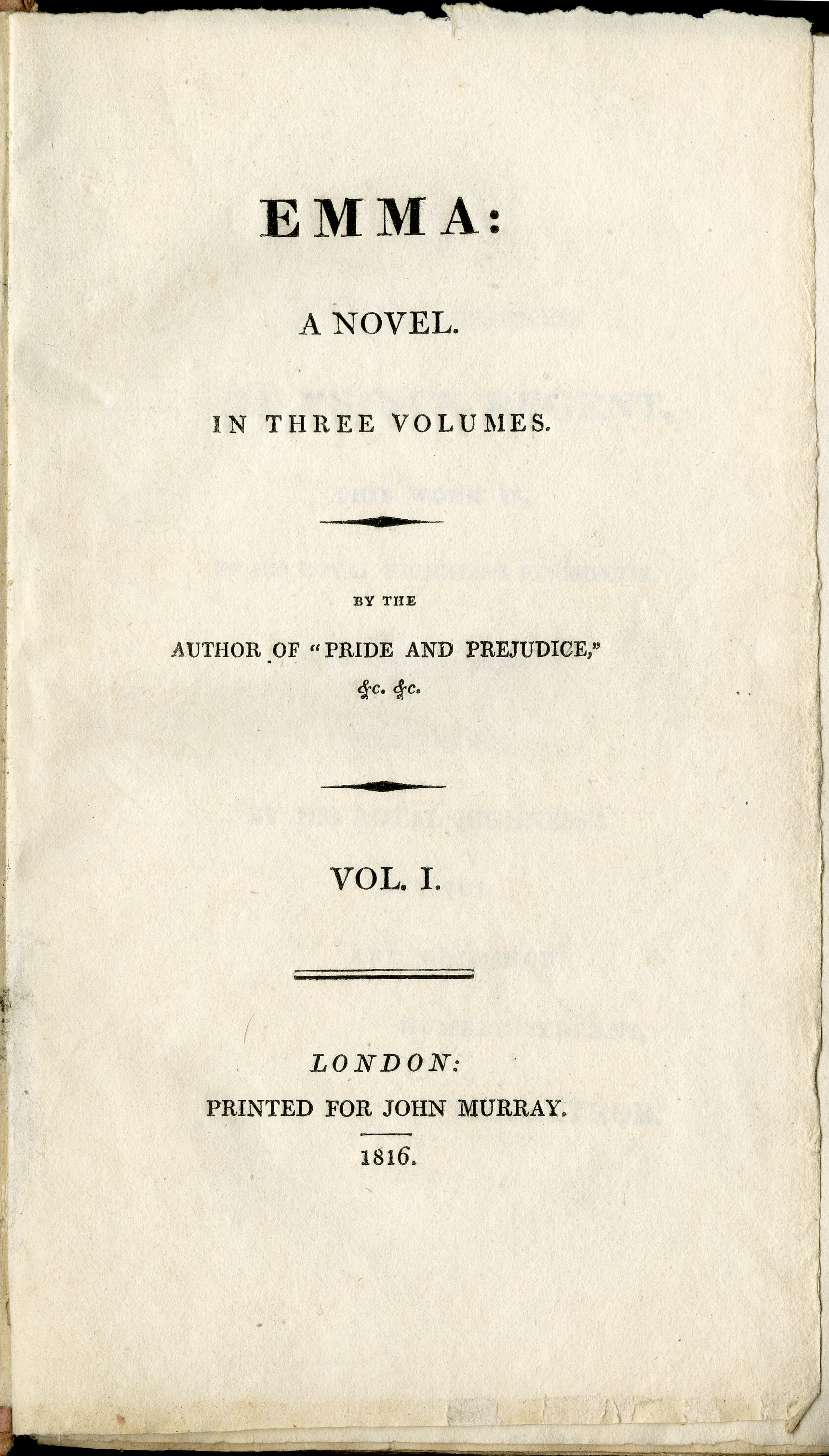
Titlepage of Emma

Mrs. Goddard was the mistress of a School — not of a seminary, or an establishment, or any thing which professed, in long sentences of refined nonsense, to combine liberal acquirements with elegant morality upon new principles and new systems — and where young ladies for enormous pay might be screwed out of health and into vanity — but a real, honest, old-fashioned Boarding-school, where a reasonable quantity of accomplishments were sold at a reasonable price, and where girls might be sent to be out of the way and scramble themselves into a little education, without any danger of coming back prodigies. Mrs. Goddard’s school was in high repute — and very deservedly; for Highbury was reckoned a particularly healthy spot: she had an ample house and garden, gave the children plenty of wholesome food, let them run about a great deal in the summer, and in winter dressed their chilblains with her own hands. It was no wonder that a train of twenty young couple now walked after her to church. She was a plain, motherly kind of woman, who had worked hard in her youth, and now thought herself entitled to the occasional holiday of a tea-visit.

— Jane Austen, Emma

Following the execution of Louis XVI at the end of January 1793, the Abbey School became a place of refuge for émigrés such as statesman Charles Alexandre de Calonne. In addition to this profligate hospitality, St Quentin gambled with Dr Valpy and the father of Mary Russell Mitford, and soon the school was forced to close. In March 1794 the auctioneer advertised the household and school goods for sale, including 40 bedsteads (beds were shared), "magic lanthorns" for instruction, and books in French and English. Claire Tomalin, the biographer of Jane Austen, sums up the school as a "harmless, slatternly place".

== Hans Place, London and Frances Arabella Rowden ==
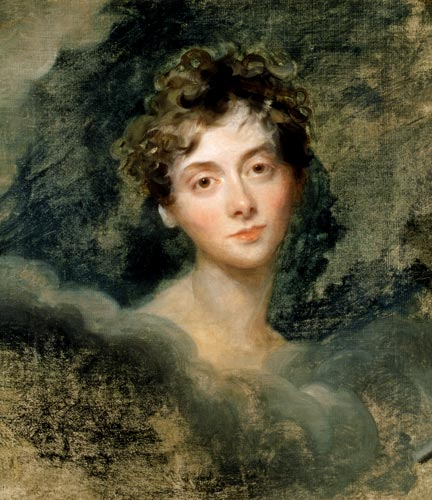
Portrait of Lady Caroline Lamb

A couple of years later, the St Quentins opened another school, this time in the capital, at 22 Hans Place. This garden square address, in the desirable West End of London, was made possible by their former pupil Mrs Sherwood selling a novel. The St Quentins employed Frances Arabella Rowden (1774–1840?), who had been a parlour boarder with them in Reading when she was 16. Rowden's mother kept a school at Henley-on-Thames, at which Mary Wollstonecraft's sister Everina worked briefly. One source says Rowden was a governess in the household of Lord Bessborough (i.e. Frederick Ponsonby, 3rd Earl of Bessborough and his wife Harriet Spencer, whose only daughter was Lady Caroline Ponsonby, more commonly known by her married name as Lady Caroline Lamb).

Rowden was an engaging teacher, with a particular enthusiasm for the theatre, and as a private tutor to Mary Russell Mitford, she was able to indulge her fondness for the Kemble family of actors. Rowden was not only a poet, but, according to Mitford, "she had a knack of making poetesses of her pupils". Some of the girls she taught at the Hans Place school included the above-mentioned Caroline Ponsonby, who wrote Glenarvon following her affair with Lord Byron; the poet Letitia Elizabeth Landon ("L.E.L."); Emma Roberts, the travel writer; Anna Maria Fielding, who published as S.C. Hall; and Rosina Doyle Wheeler, who married Edward Bulwer-Lytton and published her many novels as Rosina Bulwer Lytton.

The school taught Greek and Latin, unlike its curriculum in Reading; it also taught French and Italian, and dance and deportment. British History Online deems it a "superior school". It was smaller than its Reading Abbey predecessor, with only 23 in the household, and this would have included live-in servants. In 1809 St Quentin retired and Rowden took over 22 Hans Place.

Curiously, Jane Austen's brother Henry moved into number 23 in 1814, so on her visits to London, she stayed next door to her old school. "L.E.L." was born at number 25 in 1802, and after attending school at number 22 as a small child, ended up lodging in a room on the top floor between 1826 and 1837. By that point, the house had been taken by two Misses Lance, who also ran it as a school. Much later, 22 Hans Place formed the headquarters of the 1921 Irish Treaty delegation. Another innovative educational establishment, Hill House School, has been based in Hans Place since 1951.

== Paris ==
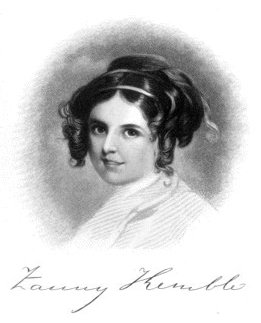
Fanny Kemble as a young girl

In 1798, St Quentin filed an affidavit "concerning denization", a relatively straightforward way, now obsolete, of gaining what we would call permanent residency.

With the renewed peace, the St Quentins decided to try a Parisian retirement. Frances Rowden followed in 1818 and opened a school at various locations. She had as her final notable pupil Frances (Fanny) Kemble, of the acting family. Kemble mocked the literature that Rowden deemed suitable.

St Quentin was widowed, and in April 1825 he and Rowden were married at the Hôtel de Charost, residence of the British Ambassador in Paris. The Embassy's chaplain Edward Forster, also a writer, officiated. She would have been about 50, and he, 75. It is not known what happened to them afterwards.

== Works by Dominique de St Quentin ==
- A complete system of the commercial geography of England; laid down in plain and concise manner, for the use of schools. 1794. W. Baynes.
- A New Grammar of the French Language. 2nd edition 1812. Longman. 230 pages.
- The First Rudiments of General Grammar, Applicable to All Languages. A. J. Valpy; sold by Longman, Hurst, Rees, Orme, & Brown, 1812. 163 pages.

== Works by Frances Arabella Rowden ==
- A Poetical Introduction to the Study of Botany (1801). (See History of botany for a discussion on the perceived suitability of this science for young ladies.)
- Biographical sketches of the most distinguished writers, for the use in schools (1820)
- The Pleasures of Friendship
- A Christian Wreath for the Pagan Deities: Or, An Introduction to the Greek and Roman Mythology. Her introduction says her outline is "principally selected from Abbé Tressan's abridgment of the learned and voluminous labors of Abbé Banier", referring to Antoine Banier's Mythologie et la fable expliqués par l'histoire (1711). It is dedicated to the Countess of Bessborough, her employer above.

== Schools with related names ==
- Reading Girls' School, founded as Reading Girls' British School, based on the monitorial system of mutual instruction, whereby the older pupils taught the younger. This had opened in 1810 for boys, and in 1818 was extended to girls. It continues today as a foundation (state-funded) school.
- The Abbey School, Reading, founded in the 1870s and renamed in 1914 after the school at which Jane Austen studied. It continues today as an independent (fee-paying) school.
