= Mary Martha Sherwood bibliography =

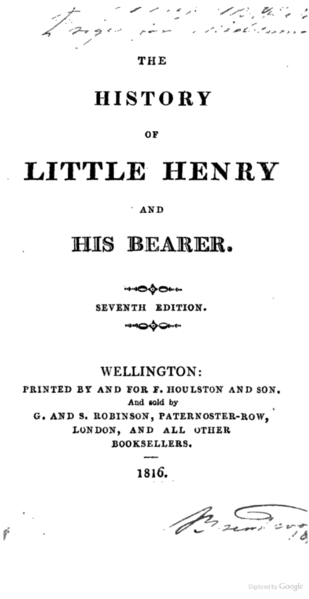
Title page from the seventh edition of The History of Little Henry and his Bearer

The following is a list of the published works of Mary Martha Sherwood. Because it relies on M. Nancy Cutt's annotated bibliography of Sherwood's books in Mrs. Sherwood and her Books for Children, this list does not include her many periodical articles, such as those she wrote for The Youth's Magazine. The list follows Cutt's generic divisions.

== Books ==
- The Traditions (1795)
- Margarita (1799)
- The History of Susan Gray (1802) - no copy of this edition is known to have survived
- The History of Little Henry and his Bearer (1814)
- The History of Susan Gray (1815) (revised)
- The History of Lucy Clare (1815)
- The Memoirs of Sergeant Dale, his Daughter and the Orphan Mary (1815)
- The Ayah and Lady (1816)
- An Introduction to Astronomy (1817)
- Stories Explanatory of the Church Catechism (1817)
- The History of the Fairchild Family, Part I (1818)
- The History of Theophilus and Sophia (1818)
- The Indian Pilgrim (1818)
- An Introduction to Geography (1818)
- The Little Woodman and his Dog Caesar (1818)
- A General Outline of Profane History (1819)
- The Hedge of Thorns (1819)
- The Governess, or The Little Female Academy (1820)
- The History of George Desmond (1821)
- The Infant's Progress from the Valley of Destruction to Everlasting Glory (1821)
- Mrs. Sherwood's Primer, or First Book for Children (1821)
- The Recaptured Negro (1821)
- Blind Richard (1821?)
- The Village Schoolmistress (1821?)
- The Orphans of Normandy, or Florentin and Lucie (1822)
- The History of Henry Milner, Part I (1822)
- The History of Little Lucy and her Dhaye (1823)
- The Infant's Grave (1823)
- The Lady of the Manor (1823-9)
- Père La Chaise (1823)
- The History of Mrs. Catharine Crawley (1824)
- The Bible Teacher's Manual (1824)
- My Uncle Timothy (1825)
- Clara Stephens (1825)
- Juliana Oakley (1825)
- The Captive of Ceylon (1826)
- The Soldier's Orphan, or The History of Maria West (1826)
- The History of Henry Milner, Part II (1826)
- The Gipsy Babes (1826)
- A Chronology of Ancient History (1826-7)
- Susannah, or The Three Guardians (1827)
- Le Fevre (1827)
- Religious Fashion, or the History of Anna (1827)
- The Pulpit and the Desk (1827)
- The Birthday Present (1827)
- Arzoomund (1828)
- My Aunt Kate (1828)
- Southstone's Rock (1828)
- Theophilus (1828)
- Emancipation (1829)
- The Millennium, or Twelve Stories (1829)
- The Babes in the Wood of the New World (1830?)
- The Stranger at Home (1830?)
- Roxobel, or English Manners and Customs Seventy Years Ago (1830-1)
- Ermina (1831)
- The History of Henry Milner, Part III (1831)
- Scripture Prints with Explanations (1831)
- Dudley Castle (1832)
- The Nun (1833)
- The Latter Days (1833)
- The Little Momiére (1833)
- Victoria (1833)
- The Monk of Cimiés (1834)
- Sabbaths on the Continent (1835)
- Caroline Mordaunt, or The Governess (1835)
- The Old Cobler of the Cottage to which is added the Idler (1835) - Sherwood wrote only The Idler
- Shanty the Blacksmith (1835)
- Social Tales for the Young (1835)
- Biography Illustrated (1836)
- Contributions for Youth (1836) - no copy has been discovered
- The Cloak to which is added the Quilting (1836) - Sherwood wrote only The Cloak
- The History of Henry Milner, Part IV (1837)
- Sea-Side Stories (1838)
- The Little Girl's Keepsaid (1839)
- Former and Latter Rain (1840) - no copy has been discovered
- The Heron's Plume (1840-7)
- The Fall of Pride (1840-7)
- The White Pigeon (1840-7)
- Martin Crook (1840-7)
- Julietta di Lavenza (1841)
- The Juvenile Forget-me-Not (1841)

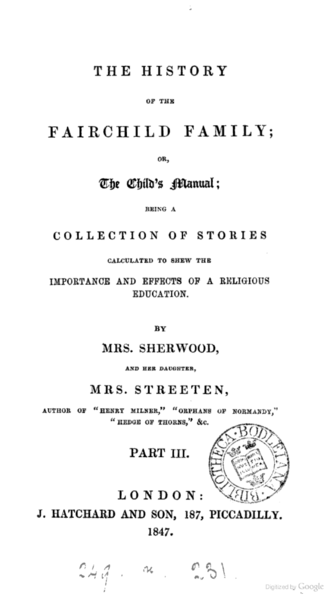
Title page from Part III of The History of the Fairchild Family

- The Holiday Keepsake (1841)
- The Joys and Sorrows of Childhood and The Loss of the Rhone (1841-7)
- The Last Days of Boosy, the Bearer of Little Henry (1842)
- Robert and Frederick (1842)
- The History of the Fairchild Family, Part II (1842)
- The History of John Marten. A Sequel to the Life of Henry Milner (1844)
- The Last Trunk and The Good Nurse (1844)
- Sunday Entertainment (1844-58?)
- The History of the Fairchild Family, Part III (1847)
- The De Cliffords (1847) - by Sherwood and her daughter
- The Keepsake (1847) - not all tales are by Sherwood
- The Fairy Knoll (1848)
- The Story Book of Wonders (1849)
- The Golden Garland of Inestimable Delight (1849) - by Sherwood and her daughter
- The Young Lord and Other Tales (1849-50) - "Victorine Durocher" is by Sherwood and her daughter
- Green's Nursery Annual (1851) - "The Harvest Home" is by Sherwood
- The Two Knights (1851)
- Jamie Gordon, or The Orphan (1851) - no copy has been discovered
- Brotherly Love (1851) - by Sherwood and her daughter
- The Mirror of Maidens in the Days of Queen Bess (1851) - by Sherwood and her daughter
- Home Stories for the Young (1852)
- Boys Will Be Boys, of The Difficulties of a Schoolboy's Life (1854) - by Sherwood and her daughter
- The Golden City and Other Tales (1854-62?) - by Sherwood and her daughter
- The Greedy Boy, and Grateful Dog, and Other Tales (1854-62?)
- Must I Learn, and Other Tales (1854-62?)
- Grand-Aunt's Pictures (1854-62?)
- William and Henry (1854-62?) - no copies have been discovered
- Mary and her Grandmama (1854-62?) - no copies have been discovered
- John and James (1854-62?) - no copies have been discovered
- My New Story Book (1861)

== Chapbooks and pennybooks ==
- The History of Emily and her Brothers (1816)
- The History of Little George and his Penny (1816)
- The Busy Bee (1818)
- A Drive in the Coach through the Streets of London (1818)
- The Rose. A Fairy Tale (1818)
- The Errand Boy (1819)
- The Little Sunday School Child's Reward (1819)
- The Orphan Boy (1819)
- The Wishing Cap (1819)
- Little Arthur (1820)
- The May-Bee (1820)
- Little Robert and the Owl (1821)
- Easy Questions for a Little Child (1822)
- Julian Percival (1826)
- The Two Dolls (1826)
- The Dry Ground (1827)
- Edward Mansfield (1827)
- The Lady in the Arbour (1827)
- A Series of Questions and Answers Illustrative of the Church (1827)
- The Fawns (1828)
- The Hills (1828)
- Home (1828)
- Poor Burruff (1828)
- The Rainbow (1828)
- Soffrona and her Cat Muff (1828)
- The Rosebuds (1828)
- The Idiot Boy (1828)
- The Thunder Storm (1828)
- The Mourning Queen (1829)
- The Orange Grove (1829)
- Intimate Friends (1830)
- Katherine Seward (1830)
- The Hidden Treasure (1830?)
- A Mother's Duty (1830?)
- The Stolen Fruit (1830?)
- Everything Out of its Place (1831)
- A Visit to Grandpapa (1833?)
- The Bible (1838)
- The Happy Family (1838)
- The Little Negroes (1838)
- Lucy's Going to School (1840-50)
- Horses and Coaches (1840-50)
- Land of Snow (1840-50)
- The Useful Dog (1840-50)
- Dangerous Sport (1840-50)
- Susan's First Money (1840-50)
- The Flood (1840-50)
- The Honey Drop (1840-50)
- The Indian Chief (1840-50)
- The Shawl (1840-50)
- Eyes and Ears (1840-50)
- Going to the Fair (1840-50)
- How to Please (1840-50)
- The Partin Cup (1840-50)
- Yours is the Best (1840-50)
- Willy Cary (1840-50)
- Conceit Checked (1840-50)
- What Could I Do Without Grandmother? (1840-50)
- What's the Use of That? (1840-50)
- Let Me Take Care of Myself (1840-50)
- The Druids of Britain (1840-50)
- The Blind Gentleman (1840-50)
- The Child is but a Child (1840-50)
- Comfort in Death (1840-50)
- My Prize Book (1848-62)

== Religious tracts ==
- The Infirmary (1817?)
- The Two Sisters (1819?)
- The Golden Clew (1820) - Nos. 41-2 of William Whittemore's tract series
- The Nursery Maid's Diary (1820?)
- Procrastination, or The Evil of Putting Off (1820?) - No. 23 of William Whittemore's tract series
- The Young Mother (1820?) - No. 24 of William Whittemore's tract series
- The Iron Cage (1820?) - No. 24 of William Whittemore's tract series
- Mary Anne (1820?)
- Abdallah, the Merchant of Bagdad (1820-5?)
- The Fountain of Living Waters (1820-5?)
- Charles Lorraine, or The Young Soldier (1821) - Nos. 5-9 of William Whittemore's tract series
- The Young Forester (1821-2?) - Nos. 1-4 of Houlston's New Series of Religious Tracts
- The China Manufactory (1821-2?) - No. 5 of Houlston's New Series of Religious Tracts
- The Bitter Sweet (1822?) - Nos. 19-20 of Houlston's New Series of Religious Tracts
- The Penny Tract (1822-3?) - No. 1 of William Whittemore's tract series
- The History of Mary Saunders (1822-3?) - No. 11 of William Whittemore's tract series
- The Blind Man and Little George (1822-3?) - No. 13 of William Whittemore's tract series
- The Potter's Commons, or The Happy Choice (1822-3) - Nos. 15-18 of William Whittemore's tract series
- The Poor Man of Colour, or The Sufferings (1822-3)
- The Blessed Family (1823?) - No. 2 of William Whittemore's tract series
- Common Errors (1822-5?) - No. 21 of Houlston's New Series of Religious Tracts
- Old Times (1823-7?) - Nos. 23-4 of Houlston's New Series of Religious Tracts
- Content and Discontent (1824)
- The Lambourne Bell (1824?) - No. 28 of William Whittemore's tract series
- The Little Beggars (1824) - Nos. 29-30 of William Whittemore's tract series
- Waste Not Want Not (1824) - Nos. 35-38 of William Whittemore's tract series
- Joan, or Trustworthy (1826-8?) - Nos. 31-2 of Houlston's New Series of Religious Tracts
- The Cottage in the Wood (1826-8?) - Nos. 41-2 of Houlston's New Series of Religious Tracts
- The Turnpike House (1826-8?) - Nos. 51-2 of Houlston's New Series of Religious Tracts
- The Hop-Picking (1826-30?) - Nos. 61-2 of Houlston's New Series of Religious Tracts
- Do Your Own Work (1826-30?) - No. 67 of Houlston's New Series of Religious Tracts
- Do What You Can (1826-30?) - No. 71 of Houlston's New Series of Religious Tracts
- False Colours (1826-30?) - No. 72 of Houlston's New Series of Religious Tracts
- It Is Not My Business (1826-30?) - No. 81 of Houlston's New Series of Religious Tracts
- The Two Sisters, or Ellen and Sophia (1827)
- The Little Orphan (1829)
- Little Sally (1829)
- The Butterfly (1829)
- The Golden Chain (1829)
- The Crows' Nest (1829) (listed in an advertisement but never discovered)
- Darkwood Court (1829) (listed in an advertisement but never discovered)
- The Apprentice (1829) (listed in an advertisement but never discovered)
- The Red Book (1830)
- The Father's Eye (1830)
- The Mountain Ash (1830)
- Obedience (1830)
- The Two Paths, or The Lofty Way and The Lowly Way (1830)
- The Useful Little Girl and The Little Girl Who was of no Use at all (1830)
- The Flowers of the Forest (1830)
- The Oddingley Murders (1830)
- Sequel to the Oddingley Murders (1830)
- Hard Times (1830-1)
- Emmeline (1832)
- Aleine, or Le Bächen Hölzli (1833)
- The Convent of St. Clair (1833)
- My Godmother (1833)
- The Ball and the Funeral (1833?)
- The Basket-Maker (1834-5)
- The Red Morocco Shoes (1835)
- The Roman Baths, or The Two Orphans (1835)
- Saint Hospice (1835)
- The Violet Leaf (1835)
- The Last Request of Emily (1836)
- The Well-Directed Sixpence (1836)
- The School Girl (1836)
- The Parson's Case of Jewels (1837)
- The Indian Orphans (1839)
- The Garland. A Collection of Moral Tales (1835)

== Assorted ==
- "Preface" to Scripture Exercises (1825)

== Periodicals ==
- The Youth's Magazine (1822-48) - "This periodical . . . brought out tales, tracts, and articles by mrs. Sherwood for over twenty-five years (signed at first M.M., and after 1827, M.M.S.) The earlier tales were rapidly reprinted by Houlston, Darton, Melrose, Knight and Lacey and the R.T.S. [Religious Tract Society], as well as by various American publishers."
- The Child's Magazine (1823-4)

== Collections ==
- The Works of Mrs. Sherwood by Harper & Bros. (1834-57)
- Mrs. Sherwood's Popular Tales by Milner and Sowerby (1860)
- Mrs. Sherwood's Juvenile Tales by Milner and Sowerby (1861)
- The Lily Series by R. B. Carter & Bros. (1869)
- The Juvenile Library by Swan, Sonnenschein & Co. (1880)
