= The Abbey School, Reading =

The Abbey School
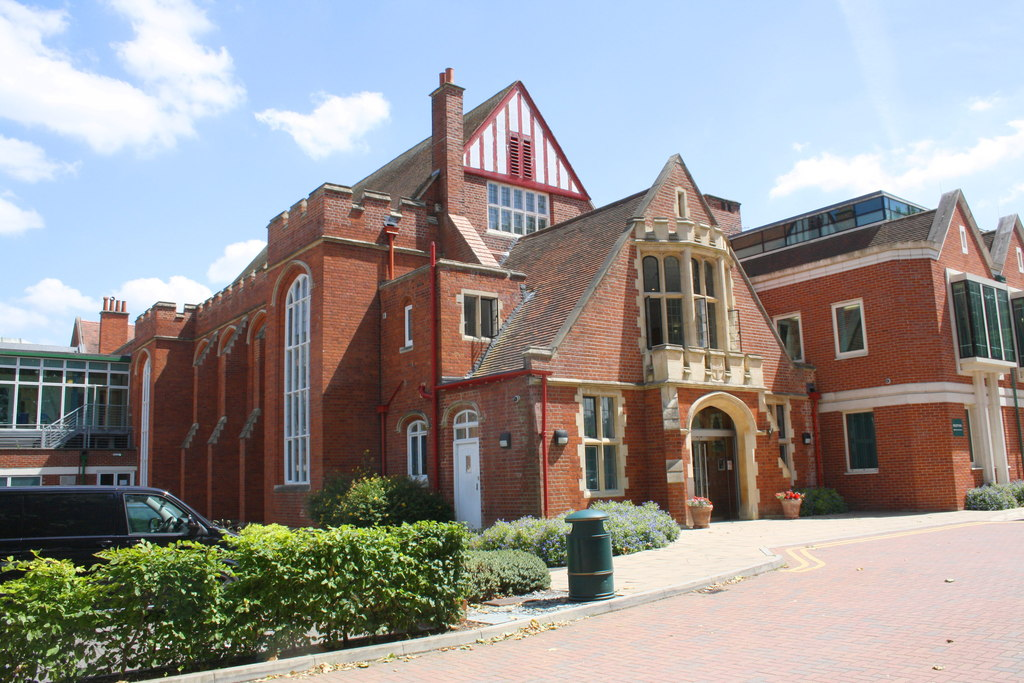

Location
- Kendrick Road; Reading, Berkshire, RG1 5DZ; England
- Coordinates: 51°26′54″N 0°57′47″W

Information
- Type: Private day school
- Established: 1887
- Department for Education URN: 110165 Tables
- Chair of Governors: Liz Harrison
- Head: Dr Sarah Tullis
- Gender: Girls
- Age: 3 to 18
- Enrollment: 1,006 (2020)
- Website: http://www.theabbey.co.uk

The Abbey School is a private selective day school for girls, in Reading, Berkshire, England.

== Overview ==
The Abbey School provides education for girls aged 3 to 18 years. The school is based in the centre of Reading, on Kendrick Road. The current Head is Dr Sarah Tullis. In 2006, the school had just over 1,000 students throughout the school, from Junior to Sixth Form. The school became an International Baccalaureate World School in 2008.

Founded in 1887, the school moved to its present site in 1905 under the leadership of headmistress Helen Musson.

Notable alumnae include the novelist and social activist Brigid Brophy, the novelist Elizabeth Taylor the educationalist Baroness Brigstocke, and the historian Lucy Worsley. Around 100 years before the school was founded in 1887, the novelist Jane Austen briefly attended Reading Ladies' Boarding School within the Abbey Gateway, which is commemorated by, and incorporated into, the Abbey School's crest. In 2017, HRH The Countess of Wessex visited the school as part of their 130th anniversary celebrations.

== History ==
The school was founded in 1887 by Francis Paget - who later became an Oxford bishop - and named Reading High School, replacing the privately owned Blenheim House Ladies' School. It was located at London Road (in the building which became the Gladstone Club). The Church Schools Company, instrumental in founding the school, felt that Reading, with its growing population reaching 60,000, was in need of a new school. The school aimed to provide high quality education with a Christian ethos at an affordable price. When founded, the school had an enrolment of 40 girls, which steadily increased to 120 by 1902.

In 1905, the school moved to its current Kendrick Road site. On 16 March 1905 William Methuen Gordon Ducat, the Archdeacon of Berkshire, laid the foundation stone of the school, which featured the inscription, "In aedificationem' corporis Christi". This motto, taken from Ephesians IV:12, meaning "Building up the body of Christ," can still be seen on the school's crest and promotional t-shirts. The new site was a vast improvement on the old site: there were six classrooms, a hall and space for playing fields.

The school changed its name to The Abbey School in 1913, after parting from the Church Schools' Company. The name was chosen to commemorate a former Reading school dating from 1835, which was based in the Abbey Gateway. A previous school in the Abbey Gateway operating in the 18th-century, named Reading Ladies' Boarding School, included Jane Austen among its pupils. The Abbey is now a day school, after ceasing to accept boarding pupils in 1946, and was a direct grant (C. of E.) grammar school in the 1950s.

As of 2006, roughly 45% of entrants in the Upper Three (year 7) came from the Junior School, with the remainder of the incoming year group being made up of students from other schools in Berkshire.

== Reports ==
As an independent school, Ofsted do not perform inspections of the school. However, Ofsted have inspected the Early Years Centre. The Independent Schools Inspectorate performed an inspection on the whole school in 2002. In 2004, Ofsted inspected the Early Years Centre only, that is, from ages 3 to 5. The Good Schools Guide produced a report on the Abbey in 2005.

== Notable former pupils ==
- Joyce Baird, trade union leader
- Baroness Brigstocke, High Mistress of St Paul's Girls' School
- Brigid Brophy, novelist, essayist, feminist
- Jenni Falconer, television presenter
- Amy Flaxman, scientist, working on ChAdOx1 nCoV-19 at the Jenner Institute, University of Oxford (Oxford AstraZeneca COVID-19 vaccine)
- Kate Humble, television presenter
- Joanna Kennedy, civil engineer
- Miranda Krestovnikoff, presenter of BBC TV 'Coast'
- Krissi Murison, editor of the New Musical Express (NME)
- Claire Taylor, cricketer
- Elizabeth Taylor, author
- Sally Taylor, television presenter (BBC South Today)
- Minette Walters, novelist
- Alexandra Wood, violinist
- Lucy Worsley, historian, author, curator and television presenter

== See also ==
- Reading Girls' School
- Reading Abbey Girls' School
