= Stanford with Orleton =

Civil parish in Worcestershire, England

Coordinates: 52.207384°N 2.36684°W

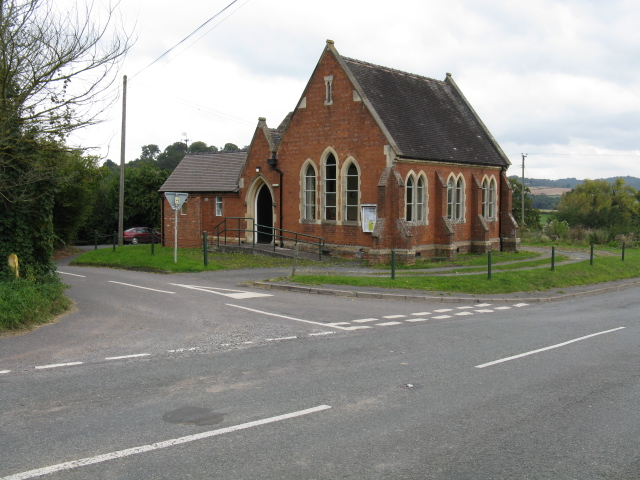
- Stanford village hall

- Location within Worcestershire
- Area: 7.368 km^{2} (2.845 sq mi)
- Population: 188 (2021)
  - Density: 26/km^{2} (67/sq mi)
  - London: 137 miles, 220km
- Civil parish: Stanford with Orleton
- District: Malvern Hills
- Shire county: Worcestershire
- Region: West Midlands
- Country: England
- Sovereign state: United Kingdom
- Post town: Worcester
- Postcode district: WR6
- Police: West Mercia
- Fire: Hereford and Worcester
- Ambulance: West Midlands
- UK Parliament: West Worcestershire

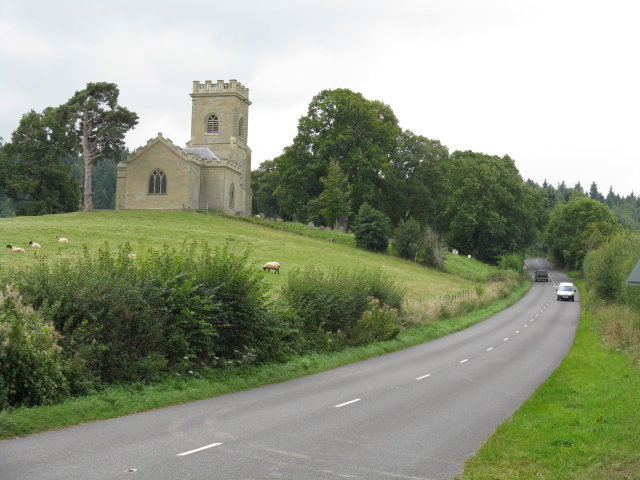
Stanford on Teme Church

Stanford with Orleton is a civil parish in the Malvern Hills district, in the county of Worcestershire, England. The parish comprises the villages of Stanford on Teme and Orleton. In 2021 it had a population of 188.

== History ==
The parish was formed on 1 April 1933 from "Orleton" and "Stanford on Teme" parishes.

Orleton was in the upper division of Doddingtree Hundred.
