= Frances Rowden =

British schoolmistress and poet

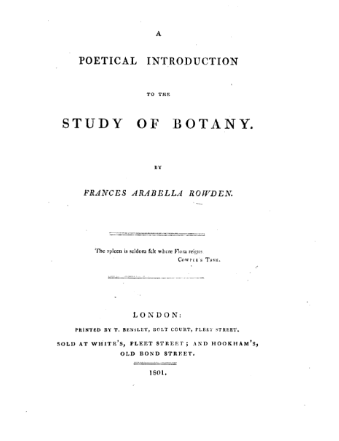
- 1801 text book
- Born: Frances Arabella Rowden; 1774; England
- Died: c. 1840 (aged around 66)
- Other name: Frances Arabella de Quentin
- Occupation: school teacher
- Known for: her teaching
- Spouse: Dominique de St Quentin

Frances Arabella Rowden, later Frances de St Quentin, (1774 – c. 1840) was a British schoolmistress and poet. Her students included Emma Roberts, Anna Maria Fielding, Letitia Elizabeth Landon, Frances Anne Kemble and Rosina Bulwer Lytton.

== Life ==
Rowden was the first of four daughters born to Frances and Robert Rowden. She was born in 1774 and in 1779 her family moved to Henley-on-Thames where her father borrowed money from her aunt who ran a school (where she was educated). Her father was a dealer in spirits and drugs, and died in debt to his sister in 1782.

Rowden went on to work at Reading Abbey Girls' School which was run by the principal Dominique de St Quentin and Ann Pitts who was the senior mistress and his wife. The school's former pupils included Jane Austen.

In 1801 she published A Poetical Introduction to the Study of Botany which was unusual in that it broke up the facts about botany with poems. Her book may have been seen as an uncontroversial alternative to Erasmus Darwin.

A Biographical Sketch of the Most Distinguished Writers, by Frances Rowden

During Rowden's eventful career she had a number of notable pupils. These included actress Frances Anne Kemble, and the novelists Anna Maria Fielding, Letitia Elizabeth Landon, Emma Roberts, and Rosina Bulwer Lytton.

On 6 April 1825, at the Hôtel de Charost, residence of the British Ambassador in Paris, Rowden married Dominique de St Quintin. The Embassy's chaplain Edward Forster, also a writer, officiated.

She died around 1840.

== Works ==
- A Poetical Introduction to the Study of Botany, London: White and Hookham, 1801
- The Pleasures of Friendship; A poem, in Two Parts, London: Longman, Hurst, Rees, and Orme, 1810
