= Stanford on Teme =

Village in Worcestershire, England

Coordinates: 52.290156°N 2.436377°W

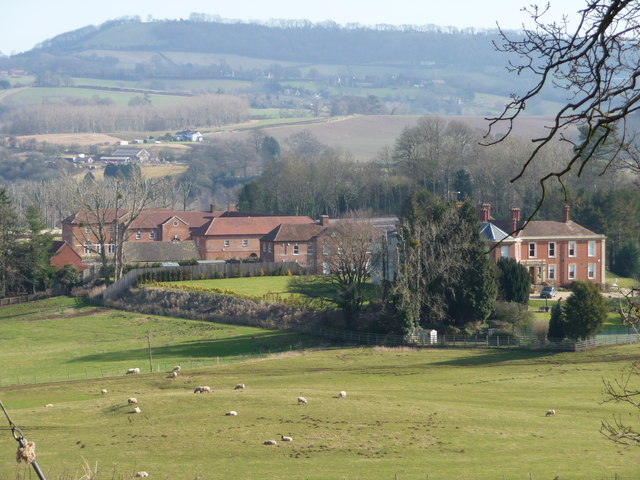
- Stanford Court

- Location within Worcestershire
- OS grid reference: SO735658
- Civil parish: Stanford with Orleton
- District: Malvern Hills
- Shire county: Worcestershire
- Region: West Midlands
- Country: England
- Sovereign state: United Kingdom
- Post town: WORCESTER
- Postcode district: WR6
- Police: West Mercia
- Fire: Hereford and Worcester
- Ambulance: West Midlands
- UK Parliament: West Worcestershire

Stanford on Teme is a village and former civil parish, now in the parish of Stanford with Orleton, in the Malvern Hills district, in the county of Worcestershire, England. In 1931 the parish had a population of 144.

== History ==
The name Stanford derives from the Old English stānford meaning 'stone ford'.

Stanford Court, a Grade II listed 18th century stately home, is the ancestral home of the Winnington baronets. The house was first built in the reign of King James I. It was extended in the 18th century, and remodelled after a fire in 1882.

Lucy Lyttelton Cameron, the children's author was born here in 1781. She was the daughter of George Butt and his wife and they had another daughter named Mary Martha. The rectory in Stanford was built for George Butt just to the west of the church.

On 1 April 1933 the parish was abolished and merged with "Orleton" to form "Stanford with Orleton".
