= Heather Brigstocke, Baroness Brigstocke =

British schoolteacher, academic and politician

The Right Honourable The Baroness Brigstocke CBE
- Born: Heather Renwick Brown; 2 September 1929; UK
- Died: 30 April 2004 (aged 74); Athens, Greece
- Occupations: Schoolteacher; Life Peer (Conservative Party)
- Spouse(s): Geoffrey Brigstocke (died 1974); 4 children Hugh Griffiths, Baron Griffiths (2000-2004; her death)
- Children: 4 (by first marriage)

Member of the House of Lords
- Lord Temporal
- Life peerage 21 May 1990 – 30 April 2004

Heather Brigstocke, Baroness Brigstocke CBE (2 September 1929 – 30 April 2004) was a British educator, academic and Conservative Life Peer.

== Life ==
She was born into a working-class family as Heather Renwick Brown in Birchington, Kent, the daughter of Squadron Leader John Renwick Brown, DFC, a former Scottish miner and newsagent. Brown was persuaded to have a career in the RAF after the war.

She was educated at The Abbey School, Reading, where a classics teacher encouraged her to apply to university. She won a state scholarship to Girton College, Cambridge, later switching to the Archaeology and Anthropology course.

Brigstocke was a talented stage actress, but her parents refused to allow her to pursue her wishes. She had developed a mellifluous voice, rich with charm, which she put to good use at business school, and later on when talking to parents. She spent her time at university touring Sweden with an acting troupe performing Shakespeare, and then at parties with the likes of Norman St John Stevas and Julian Slade. She was the first woman to win the Winchester Reading Prize, leaving with a lower second degree.

After a short period as a management trainee at Selfridges, she won a classics teacher's job at the independent Francis Holland School, and then at Godolphin and Latymer in Hammersmith.

In 1952, she married Geoffrey Brigstocke, a civil servant and diplomat, and former POW. They had four children, three sons and one daughter, David Hugh Charles, Julian, Thomas, and Emma Persephone.

In 1961, she travelled with her husband to his post in Washington D.C., where she taught Latin at the National Cathedral School. In 1963, they returned to London and she returned to the Francis Holland School as headmistress from 1965 to 1974, and High Mistress of St Paul's Girls' School from 1974 to 1989.

On 21 May 1990, she was created a life peer as Baroness Brigstocke, of Kensington in the Royal Borough of Kensington and Chelsea and sat as a Conservative. She was part of many educational societies during the 1990s and was the founding chairman of Home-Start International. She was appointed a Governess of Imperial College, London.

On 22 January 2000, Lady Brigstocke, widowed since her husband had died in 1974 on Turkish Airlines Flight 981, married the fellow widower peer, Hugh Griffiths, Baron Griffiths, the law lord who had an interest in fishing. Brigstocke had got to know him when his wife, Evelyn, was chairman of the St Paul's Girls' School governors, and she had often stayed with them on the Isle of Wight.

In the Millennium Honours list she was made Commander of the Most Excellent Order of the British Empire (CBE) for services to the English-speaking Union, of which she had been chairman since 1993.

She was chairman of Landau Forte College, in Derby, from 1993, and enjoyed being an honorary bencher of the Inner Temple.

== Death ==
Baroness Brigstocke died in 2004, aged 74, in Athens, Greece, in a road traffic accident, when she tried to cross a badly-lit road with her assistant Rosemary Magid, after a charity meeting. Both women were killed by a speeding driver.

Her body was taken home to her children and executors at 26 Edwardes Square, W8.
