= Gilles Paquet =

Canadian economist (1936–2019)

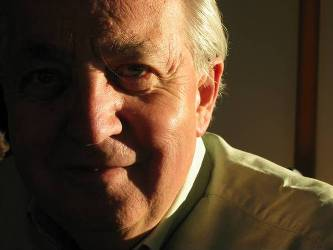
- Born: July 19, 1936; Quebec City, Quebec
- Died: January 18, 2019 (aged 82)
- Occupation(s): Professor Emeritus, School of Management and Senior Research Fellow, Centre on Governance, University of Ottawa
- Website: Gilles Paquet

Gilles Paquet, CM MSRC (July 19, 1936 – January 18, 2019) was a Canadian economist, President of the Royal Society of Canada from 2003 to 2005. He was professor emeritus at the School of Management and senior research fellow at the Centre on Governance of the University of Ottawa until his death at age 82.

== Early life ==
Paquet was professor of economics and dean of the Faculty of Graduate Studies and Research at Carleton University from 1981 to 1988; subsequently, he was dean of the Faculty of Administration at the University of Ottawa. In 1997, he was founding director of the Centre on Governance at the University of Ottawa. He chaired the panel presenting the 2006 report on the National Capital Commission Mandate Review.

Paquet authored or edited over 35 books and over 350 academic papers or book chapters. His specialties were Canadian economic history, urban and regional studies, industrial organization, public management, knowledge management, and governance. Additionally, he wrote several hundred non-academic articles in a variety of magazines and newspapers. He was noted for a particular interest in "administrative pathologies and subversion."

Paquet was active as a journalist on the radio and television network of Radio-Canada from the 1970s onwards, working as an editorial writer for some 5 years in the print media in the 1990s, and as commentator on national affairs on TVOntario from 1995 to 2006. Beginning in 1994, he was editor in chief of www.optimumonline.ca, a journal of public sector management and governance with over 10,000 subscribers.

== Honors ==
- Honorary doctorates from Université Laval, Thompson Rivers University, and Queen's University.
- (2006), he received the Public Service Citation 2006 from the Association of Professional Executives of the Public Service of Canada
- (2007), he was made an Honorary Member of the Association des économistes québécois – one of only 6 in the last thirty years.
- President of the Social Sciences Federation of Canada as well as of a number of other Canadian and Quebec associations.
- Secretary-Treasurer of the Canadian Economics Association, 1967 to 1981.
- In 1982, Jacques-Rousseau medal in recognition of important contributions to research of a multidisciplinary nature,
- 1989 the Esdras-Minville medal for the corpus of his work in social sciences.
- Member of the Royal Society of Arts in 1989,
- member of the Order of Canada 1992.

Professional and academic associations
Preceded by Howard Alper	President of the Royal Society of Canada; 2003–2005	Succeeded by Patricia Demers
