= Swaby =

Village in Lincolnshire

Coordinates: 53.276506°N 0.080018°E

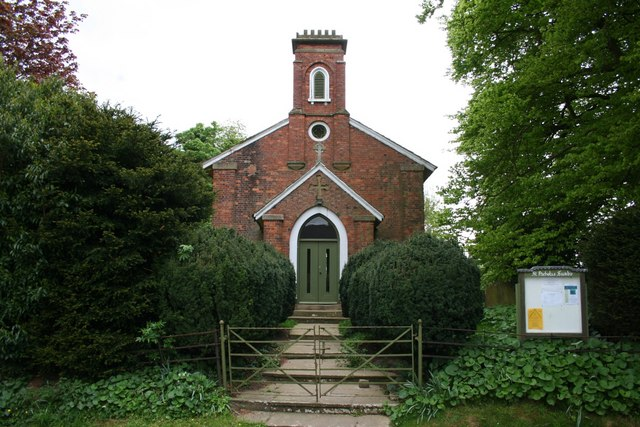
- St Nicholas's Church, Swaby

- Location within Lincolnshire
- Population: 180 (2011)
- OS grid reference: TF387775
  - London: 125 mi (201 km) S
- District: East Lindsey
- Shire county: Lincolnshire
- Region: East Midlands
- Country: England
- Sovereign state: United Kingdom
- Post town: Alford
- Postcode district: LN13
- Police: Lincolnshire
- Fire: Lincolnshire
- Ambulance: East Midlands
- UK Parliament: Louth and Horncastle

Swaby is a civil parish and village in the East Lindsey district of Lincolnshire, England, about 8 miles (13 km) north from Spilsby, and 6 miles (9.7 km) north-west from Alford. Whitepit is a hamlet half a mile west of the village.

== History ==
Swaby is listed in the Domesday Book of 1086 as consisting of 21 households, 20 acres (0.1 km^{2}) of meadow, 600 acres (2 km^{2}) of woodland and two mills.

In 1934 a hoard of 178 silver denarii in a pot was found in the field called 'The Bog' at Swaby. Lincoln Museum acquired 162 of the coins, ranging from Marcus Antoninus and Nero to Hadrian. The remainder are in the British Museum.

The parish church is a Grade II listed building dedicated to Saint Nicholas. It was built in 1828 of red brick and has a small bell turret. Lucy Lyttelton Cameron, the children's author was buried here in 1858. An earlier church, dedicated to St Margaret, was removed by Henry Vane of Belleau manor around 1658. The site of the church is now a cottage garden.

Swaby CE School was built in 1857 as a National School; it closed in 1976.

The village hall occupies the site of the old Wesleyan Methodist chapel. The chapel was built in 1839, altered in 1866, and became a free Methodist chapel in 1869.

== Special scientific interest ==
There is a designated Site of Special Scientific Interest (SSSI) in Swaby, noted under Section 28 of the Wildlife and Countryside Act 1981. The reason for the designation:

"This glacial overflow valley supports floristically diverse lime-rich marsh and unimproved chalk turf. The marsh borders a stream bisecting the valley floor and the interest of the glassland is increased by the terraced nature of the slopes."

== Population ==
Population of Swaby Civil Parish

Year	Pop.	±%
1801	197	—
1811	200	+1.5%
1821	302	+51.0%
1831	396	+31.1%
1841	391	−1.3%
1851	474	+21.2%

Year	Pop.	±%
1881	414	−12.7%
1891	364	−12.1%
1901	305	−16.2%
1911	274	−10.2%
1921	255	−6.9%
1931	211	−17.3%

Year	Pop.	±%
1951	206	−2.4%
1961	162	−21.4%
2001	199	+22.8%
2011	180	−9.5%
