= Fanny Kemble =

English actress and writer (1809–1893)

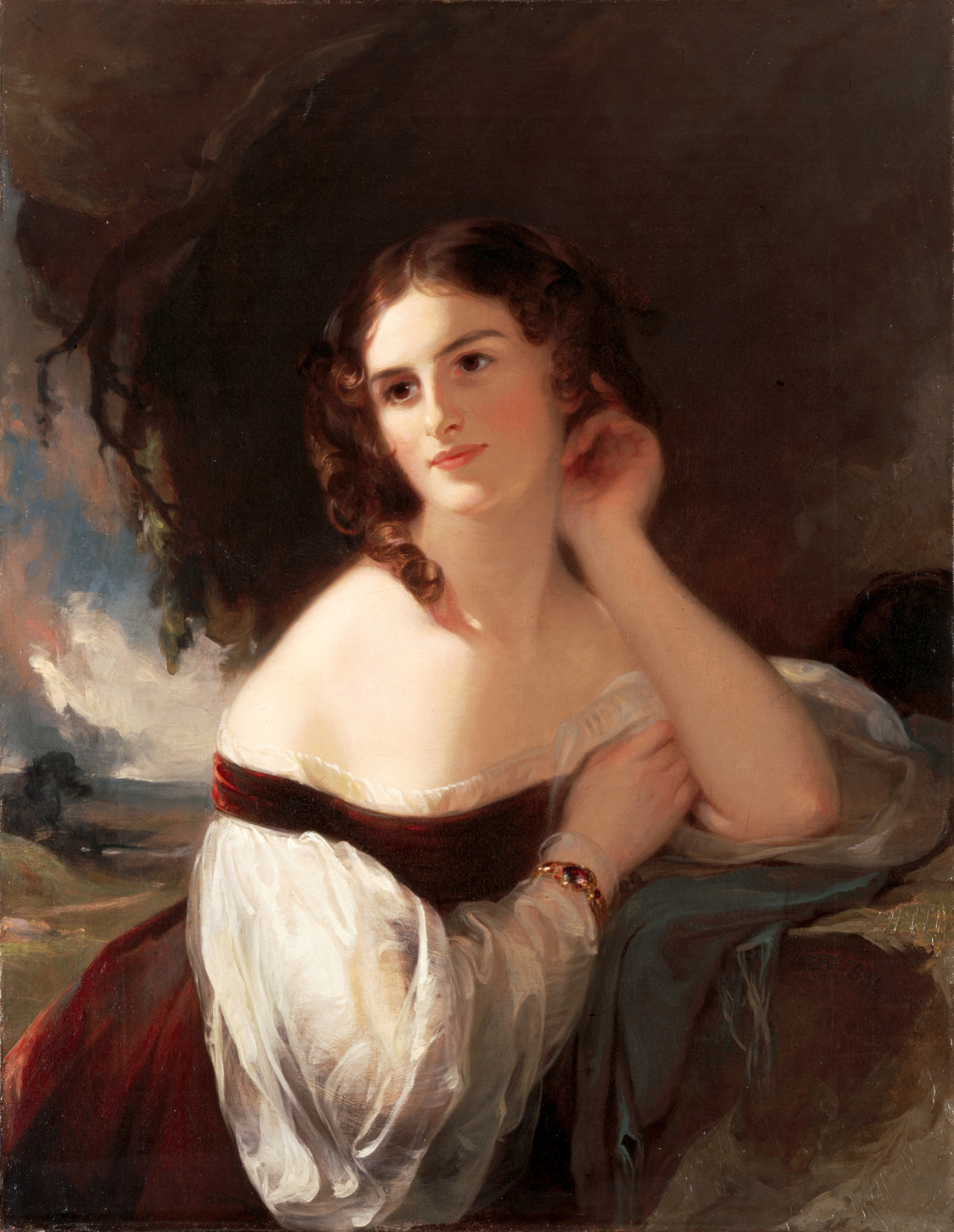
- Portrait by Thomas Sully, 1834
- Born: Frances Anne Kemble; November 27, 1809; London, England
- Died: January 15, 1893 (aged 83); London, England
- Occupations: Actress, abolitionist and poet
- Years active: 1827 – c. 1882
- Spouse: Pierce Butler (m. 1834; div. 1849)
- Parents: Charles Kemble (father); Marie Therese De Camp (mother)

Frances Anne Kemble (later Butler; 27 November 1809 – 15 January 1893) was an English actress from a theatre family in the early and mid-nineteenth century. She was a well-known and popular writer and abolitionist whose published works included plays, poetry, eleven volumes of memoirs, travel writing, and works about the theatre. She lived for many years in the United States, primarily in Philadelphia, Pennsylvania and Lenox, Massachusetts.

Kemble's "lasting historical importance...derives from the private journal she kept during her time in the Sea Islands" on her husband's plantations, where she wrote a journal documenting the conditions of the slaves on the plantation and her growing abolitionist feelings. She was also an early adopter of spoken word performances combined with music.

== Early life and education ==
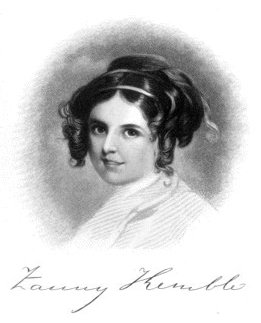
Kemble as a young girl

A member of the famous Kemble theatrical family, Fanny was the eldest daughter of the actor Charles Kemble and his Viennese-born wife, the former Marie Therese De Camp. She was a niece of the noted tragedienne Sarah Siddons and of the famous actor John Philip Kemble. Her younger sister was the opera singer Adelaide Kemble. Fanny was born in London and educated chiefly in France. In 1821, Fanny Kemble departed to boarding school in Paris to study art and music as befitted the child of the most celebrated artistic family in England at that time. In addition to literature and society, at Mrs. Lamb's Academy in the Rue d'Angoulême, Champs Elysées, Fanny received her first real personal exposure to the stage performing staged readings for students' parents during her time at school. As an adolescent, Kemble spent time studying literature and poetry, in particular the work of Lord Byron.

One of her teachers was Frances Arabella Rowden (1774 – c. 1840), who had been associated with the Reading Abbey Girls' School since she was 16. Rowden was an engaging teacher with a particular enthusiasm for the theatre. She was not only a poet but according to Mary Russell Mitford, "she had a knack of making poetesses of her pupils"

In 1827, Kemble wrote her first five-act play, Francis the First. It was met with critical acclaim from multiple quarters. Nineteenth-century critics wrote that the script "displays so much spirit and originality, so much of the true qualities which are required in dramatic composition, that it may fairly stand upon its own intrinsic worth, and that the author may fearlessly challenge a comparison with any other modern dramatist."

== Acting career ==
Fanny Kemble and Sarah Siddons by Henry Perronet Briggs, 1830. Fanny is shown with her celebrated aunt Sarah Siddons

On 26 October 1829, at the age of 19, Kemble first appeared on the stage as Juliet in Romeo and Juliet at Covent Garden Theatre, after only three weeks of rehearsals. Her attractive personality immediately made her a great favourite, and her popularity enabled her father to recoup his losses as a manager. She played all the principal women's roles of the time, notably Shakespeare's Portia and Beatrice (Much Ado about Nothing), and Lady Teazle in Richard Brinsley Sheridan's The School for Scandal. Kemble disliked the artificiality of stardom in general but appreciated the salary which she accepted to help her family in their frequent financial troubles.

In 1830, she accompanied George Stephenson on a test of the Liverpool and Manchester Railway before its opening in England and described this in a letter written in early 1830. She compared the locomotive to a horse, and claimed to have fallen in love with Stephenson. In 1832, Kemble accompanied her father on a theatrical tour of the United States. While in Boston in 1833, she journeyed to Quincy to witness the revolutionary technology of the first commercial railroad in the United States. The Granite Railway was among many sights she recorded in her journal.

Kemble retired from her acting career upon her marriage in 1834, but after her separation, she returned to acting as a solo platform performer, beginning her first American tour in 1849. During her readings, she rose to focus on presenting edited works of Shakespeare, though, unlike others, she insisted on representing his entire canon, ultimately building her repertoire to 25 of his plays. She performed in Britain and the United States, concluding her career as a platform performer in 1868.

== Marriage ==
On 7 June 1834, Kemble retired from the stage to marry a wealthy Philadelphian, Pierce Mease Butler, grandson of U.S. Senator Pierce Butler, whom she had met on an American acting tour with her father in 1832. Although they met and lived in Philadelphia, Pierce's mother was a daughter of Pierce Butler, a Founding Father who represented South Carolina at the Constitutional Convention. By agreeing to change his last name from Mease to Butler – as his grandfather's will had demanded, Butler became heir to the cotton, tobacco, and rice plantations of his grandfather on Butler Island just south of Darien, Georgia, and to the hundreds of slaves who worked them. By the time the couple's daughters, Sarah and Frances, were born, Butler had inherited three of those plantations.

Butler made trips to the plantations during the early years of their marriage but never took Kemble or their children with him. At Kemble's insistence, they finally spent the winter of 1838–1839 at the plantations at Butler and St. Simons islands, in conditions primitive compared to their house in Philadelphia, and Kemble kept a diary of her observations, later published as Journal of a Residence on a Georgian Plantation in 1838–1839, flavored strongly by abolitionist sentiment. Kemble was shocked by the living and working conditions of the slaves and their treatment by the overseers and managers. She tried to improve matters, complaining to her husband about slavery and about the mixed-race slave children attributed to the overseer, Roswell King Jr. Butler disapproved of Kemble's outspokenness, forbidding her to publish her diary.

Marital tensions emerged when the family returned to Philadelphia in the spring of 1839. Apart from their disagreements over slave treatment on Butler's plantations, Kemble was "embittered and embarrassed" by Butler's marital infidelities. Butler threatened to deny Kemble access to their daughters if she published any of her observations about the plantations.

By 1845–1847, the marriage had failed irretrievably, and Kemble returned to England.

=== Separation and divorce ===
Butler filed for a divorce in 1847, after they had been separated for some time, citing abandonment and misdeed by Kemble. The couple endured a bitter and protracted divorce in 1849, with Butler retaining custody of their two daughters. Other than brief visits, Kemble was not reunited with her daughters until each came of age at 21.

Her ex-husband squandered a fortune estimated at $700,000 but was saved from bankruptcy by a sale on 2–3 March 1859 of 436 people he held in slavery. The Great Slave Auction, at Ten Broeck racetrack outside Savannah, Georgia, was the largest single slave auction in United States history. As such, it was covered by national reporters.

After the American Civil War, Butler tried to run his plantations with free labour but failed to make a profit. He died of malaria in Georgia in 1867. Neither Butler nor Kemble remarried.

== Later stage career ==
In England, Kemble began to act on the stage again – at first in plays and then as a "reader" of Shakespeare's plays in lecture rooms and concert halls. She returned to the theatre and toured major US cities, giving successful readings of Shakespeare plays. In succeeding as a Shakespearean reader, she emulated her father's example. Her success enabled her to buy a home in Lenox, Massachusetts.

In 1877, she returned to London to join her younger daughter Frances, who had moved there with her British husband and child. Using her maiden name, Kemble lived there until her death. During this period, she was a prominent and popular figure in London society and became a great friend of the American writer Henry James during her later years. His novel, Washington Square (1880), was based on a story Kemble told him about one of her relatives.

== Literary career ==
Kemble wrote two plays, Francis the First (1832) and The Star of Seville (1837). She also published a volume of poems (1844). She published the first volume of her memoirs, Journal, in 1835, shortly after her marriage.

She waited until 1863, during the American Civil War, to publish her anti-slavery Journal of a Residence on a Georgian Plantation in 1838–1839. It became her best-known work in the United States. It included her observations of slavery and life on her husband's Southern plantation in the winter of 1838–1839. It contains the earliest-known written use of the word "vegetarian": "The sight and smell of raw meat are especially odious to me, and I have often thought that if I had had to be my own cook, I should inevitably become a vegetarian, probably, indeed, return entirely to my green and salad days.". She later published several other volumes of journals

During her time in Philadelphia, Kemble acquired a pair of leather gloves which Shakespeare had reportedly owned and which the British actor David Garrick (1717–1779) had obtained from the descendants of Shakespeare. Kemble gave these, in turn, to the Shakespearean scholar and abolitionist Horace Howard Furness (1833–1912) who donated them to the University of Pennsylvania library which holds an important Shakespeareana collection.

After separating from Butler in the 1840s, Kemble travelled in Italy and wrote a two-volume book on this time, A Year of Consolation (1847).

In 1863, Kemble also published a volume of plays, including translations from Alexandre Dumas, père and Friedrich Schiller. Other memoirs followed these: Records of a Girlhood (1878); Records of Later Life (1882); Far Away and Long Ago (1889); and Further Records (1891). Her various reminiscences contain much valuable material about the social and theatrical history of the period. She also published Notes on Some of Shakespeare's Plays (1882), based on her long experience in acting and reading his works.

In 2000, Harvard University Press published an edited compilation from her journals. These included Record of a Girlhood (1878) and Records of Later Life (1882).

== Descendants ==
Kemble's older daughter, Sarah Butler, married Owen Jones Wister, an American doctor. Their only child, Owen Wister, grew up to become a novelist, author of a popular western, The Virginian (1902).

Fanny's other daughter, Frances, met James Leigh in Georgia. He was a minister born in England. The couple married in 1871, and their only child, Alice Leigh, was born in 1874. An attempt was made to run Frances's father's plantations there with free labour, but no profit could be made. Leaving Georgia in 1877, they moved permanently to England. Frances Butler Leigh defended her father in the continuing post-war dispute over slavery as an institution. Based on her experience, Leigh published Ten Years on a Georgian Plantation since the War (1883), a rebuttal to her mother's account.

== Death ==
Her granddaughter Alice Leigh was present when Fanny Kemble died in London in 1893.

== Legacy ==
One of the most recognised depictions of Queen Victoria in her coronation year is a portrait by Thomas Sully, a renowned American artist, who modelled this painting on portraits he had made of Kemble. Both in England and the US, this portrait quickly became the most widely circulated image of the Queen. It was Sully's daughter, Blanch Sully, who first suggested to him that Kemble resembled the Queen. The popular perception of Queen Victoria in her early years as monarch is significantly influenced by her portrayal in art, particularly through depictions that were stylistically influenced by paintings of Kemble.

Professor of English, Dr. Laura Engel, has documented how Fanny Kemble, along with Sarah Siddons, Mary Robinson, and Mary Wells have an enduring legacy by helping create "the emergence of modern celebrity," casting "fame [as] the celebration of the individual."

== Controversy ==
According to Encyclopedia.com, Kemble's "lasting historical importance...derives from the private journal she kept during her time in the Sea Islands", documenting the conditions of the slaves on the plantation and her growing abolitionist feelings.

While Kemble's account of the plantations has been criticised, it is seen as notable for voicing the slaves, especially enslaved black women, and has been drawn on by many historians. As noted earlier, her daughter published a rebuttal account. Margaret Davis Cate published a strong critique in the Georgia Historical Quarterly in 1960. In the early 21st century, historians Catherine Clinton and Deirdre David studied Kemble's Journal and raised questions about her portrayals of Roswell King, father and son, who successively managed Pierce Butler's plantations, and about Kemble's racial sentiments. On Kemble's racial views, David notes she described slaves as stupid, lazy, filthy, and ugly. Such views were then common and compatible with opposing slavery and outrage at its cruelties.

Clinton noted that in 1930, Julia King, granddaughter of Roswell King Jr., stated that Kemble had falsified her account of him after he spurned her affections. There is little evidence in Kemble's Journal that she encountered Roswell King Jr. on more than a few occasions, and none that she knew his wife, the former Julia Rebecca Maxwell. But she criticized Maxwell as "a female fiend" because a slave named Sophy told her that Mrs. King had ordered the flogging of Judy and Scylla, "of whose children Mr. K[ing] was the father." Roswell King Jr. was no longer employed by her husband when Pierce Butler and Kemble began their short residency in Georgia. King had resigned due to "growing uneasiness... born of a dispute between the Kings and the Butlers over fees the elder King thought were owed him as co-administrator of Major Butler's estate."

Before arriving in Georgia, Kemble had written, "It is notorious that almost every Southern planter has a family more or less numerous of illegitimate coloured children." Her statements about Roswell King Sr. and Roswell King Jr. and their alleged status as white fathers of enslaved mulatto children are based on what other slaves told her. Individuals sometimes relied on hearsay accounts of their paternity, although European ancestry was visible. The mulatto Renty, for example, was "ashamed" to ask his mother about the identity of his father. He believed he was the son of Roswell King Jr. because "Mr. C[ouper]'s children told me so, and I 'spect they know it." John Couper, the Scottish-born owner of a rival plantation adjacent to Pierce Butler's Hampton Point on St. Simon's Island, had marked disagreements with the Roswell Kings. Clinton suggests that Kemble favored Couper's accounts.

== Biographies ==
Numerous books have appeared on Fanny Kemble and her family, including Deirdre David's A Performed Life (2007) and Vanessa Dickerson's passage on Kemble in Dark Victorians (2008). Earlier works were Fanny Kemble (1933) by Leota Stultz Driver, Fanny Kemble: A Passionate Victorian (1939) by Margaret Armstrong, Fanny Kemble: Actress, Author, Abolitionist (1967) by Winifred Wise, and Fanny Kemble: Leading Lady of the Nineteenth-century Stage : A Biography (1982) by J.C. Furnas.

Some recent biographies that focus on Kemble's role as an abolitionist include Catherine Clinton's Fanny Kemble's Civil Wars: The Story of America's Most Unlikely Abolitionist (2000). Others have studied the theatrical careers of Kemble and her family. One of these, Henry Gibbs' Affectionately Yours, Fanny: Fanny Kemble and the Theatre, appeared in eight editions between 1945 and 1947.

== Works ==
Available through Harvard University Library's Open Collections Program: Women Working 1800–1930:

- Journal of a Residence on a Georgian Plantation in 1838–1839. New York: Harper & Bros, 1863; ISBN 0-8203-0707-6
- Record of a Girlhood. London: R. Bentley and Son, 1878
- Records of Later Life. New York: H. Holt and Co., 1882
- Further Records, 1848–1883: a series of letters. London: R. Bentley and Son, 1890

Other publications:

- Francis the First, a drama (London, 1832; New York, 1833)
- Journal (2 volumes, London, 1835; Philadelphia and Boston, 1835)
- The Star of Seville, a drama (London and New York, 1837)
- Poems (London and Philadelphia, 1844; Boston, 1859)
- A Year of Consolation, a book of Italian travel (2 volumes, London and New York, 1847)
- Plays, including translations from Dumas and Schiller (London, 1863)
- Notes on Some of Shakespeare's Plays (London, 1882)
- Far Away and Long Ago (1889)
- Works by Fanny Kemble at Project Gutenberg.

Several editions of her journals have been published in the twenty-first century:

- Kemble, Fanny. Fanny Kemble's Journals, Edited and with an Introduction by Catherine Clinton, Cambridge: Harvard University Press, 2000.
- Kemble, Fanny. (1835). Journal, edited by Murray (reissued by Cambridge University Press, 2009; ISBN 978-1-108-00401-5)
- Kemble, Fanny (1863). Journal of a Residence on a Georgian Plantation in 1838–1839. Longman Green (reissued by Cambridge University Press, 2009; ISBN 978-1-108-00393-3)

== In popular culture ==
- People & Events: Fanny Kemble and Pierce Butler: 1806–1893, PBS
- Enslavement: The True Story of Fanny Kemble (1999), a made-for-TV movie adapted from her Journal of a Residence on a Georgian Plantation in 1838–1839, starring Jane Seymour as Kemble and Keith Carradine as Butler
- Fanny Kemble, directed and created by Peter Hinton-Davis with Domini Blythe, Stratford Festival, Canada, Ontario, (2006)

== See also ==
- History of slavery in the United States
