= Lucy Lyttelton Cameron =

British magazine editor and writer for children (1781–1858)

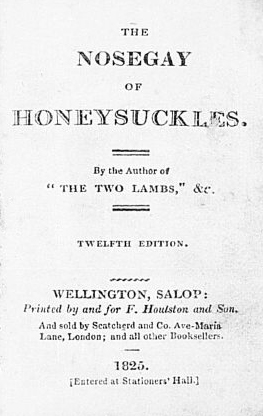
- Nosegay of Honeysuckles by Lucy Lyttelton Cameron, 1825 print
- Born: 29 April 1781; Stanford-on-Teme, UK
- Died: 6 September 1858 (aged 77); Swaby, UK
- Writing career
- Genre: Children's fiction

Lucy Lyttelton Cameron (29 April 1781 – 6 September 1858, née Butt) was a British magazine editor and a writer for children with religious themes.

== Early life and education ==
Lucy Lyttelton Cameron was born in Stanford-on-Teme, taking her name from her godmother Lady Lucy Fortescue Lyttelton. Her mother was born Martha Sherwood and her father George Butt was the vicar in Stanford at her birth and a minor poet. Her father was well connected and he became George III's Chaplain-in-Ordinary in 1783. Her father took positions at several different churches, although he died in 1795, having returned to Stanford.

In childhood she studied French, Italian and Greek. Between 1792 and 1797 she attended Reading Abbey Girls' School, depicted in the novel Emma by another former pupil, Jane Austen. She and her sister Mary (later Mary Martha Sherwood) had a strict upbringing and if it was not for her supposed delicacy then she would have been required to wear a backboard and an iron ring, like her sister, to improve her posture.

Through her family's connection to Gerrard Andrewes, who by 1802 was vicar of St James's Church, Piccadilly, Lucy was introduced to London cultural figures such as the Bluestocking Elizabeth Carter and Humphry Davy, the inventor. In Bristol she met writers Hannah More and Mary Anne Schimmelpenninck.

The year after leaving school she wrote The History of Margaret Whyte, or, The life and death of a good child, joining her sister, who was already published. By this time she was living with her mother in Bridgnorth. Both of the daughters taught at Sunday School, which is where their writings were targeted.

== Marriage and family ==
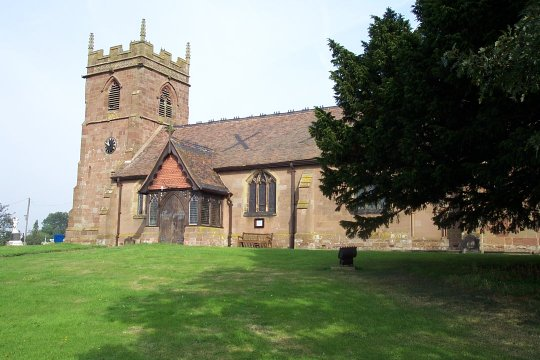
St Michael's church at Lilleshall.

Butt married in 1806, taking the name of the evangelical Reverend Charles Richard Cameron. Together they moved to Snedshill where he was the first curate at St Michael's Church at Donington Wood at Lilleshall in Shropshire where they had twelve children. The Camerons also adopted a niece when her sister followed her husband to India. The Camerons stayed in Shropshire for twenty five years before they took "the living of" Swaby in Lincolnshire, but they still lived at Snedshill. The Cameron family grew further in 1818 when her only brother's wife died. Her brother was unable to cope so her sister adopted his four sons and Cameron took his three daughters into her household. The extra expense was offset by a £50 a year allowance given to her by the industrialist, Isaac Hawkins Browne, when he died that same year.

== Writing career ==
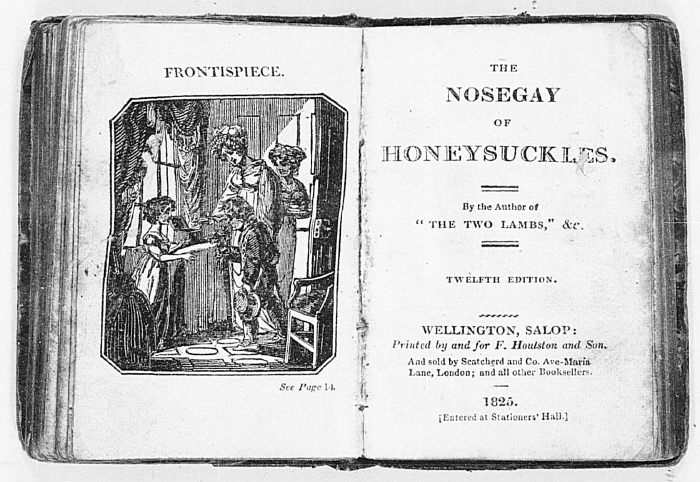
The Nosegay of Honeysuckles, 1825 edition

Throughout her life Cameron wrote as did her brother and sister. Her brother was not so productive, but her elder sister was and she enjoyed more popularity. She also published under her married name of Mary Martha Sherwood. Cameron's best known work might be The Raven and the Dove, The Nosegay of Honeysuckles, Martin and his Two Sunday Scholars or The Pink Tippet. During her life she wrote about 400 works of varying sizes which like her sister were published by a Shropshire company. This was in addition to serving as the editor of Nursery and Infants' Schools Magazine, a role she performed from 1831 to 1852. She was published in America too. Both sisters do seem to have been controlled by their publishers. Some of their work was written around existing illustrations rather than the other way round.

She and her sister are credited with creating a different focus in children's literature. Previously fiction would concentrate on moral and religious themes whose purpose was to teach conformity that would benefit society. Cameron and her sister's stories gave more emphasis to the individual and their objectives. This led to their fiction being popular not only in Sunday schools but as childhood fiction in general. They both received wide recognition. However around 1870 the fashion again moved on and their books were generally only found in Sunday schools.

Cameron died in 1858 and was buried in Swaby.
