= Hugh Griffiths, Baron Griffiths =

British soldier, judge and cricketer (1923–2015)

The Right Honourable The Lord Griffiths MC PC
- Lord Griffiths in 1985

Lord of Appeal in Ordinary
- In office 23 May 1985 – 30 September 1993
- Monarch: Elizabeth II
- Succeeded by: The Lord Lloyd of Berwick

Member of the House of Lords
- Lord Temporal
- Lord of Appeal in Ordinary; 23 May 1985 – 30 May 2015

Personal details
- Born: William Hugh Griffiths; 26 September 1923
- Died: 30 May 2015 (aged 91)
- Spouses: Evelyn Krefting (m. 1949; died 1998); Heather Renwick Brigstocke (m. 2000; died 2004); Greta Fenston (m. 2009)
- Children: 3 daughters, 1 son (by Evelyn Krefting)
- Education: St John's College, Cambridge
- Occupation: Judge
- Profession: Law

William Hugh Griffiths, Baron Griffiths, MC, PC (26 September 1923 – 30 May 2015) was a British soldier, cricketer, barrister, judge and life peer.

== Biography ==
The son of Sir Hugh Griffiths, he was educated at Charterhouse School and St John's College, Cambridge. During the Second World War he served in the Welsh Guards, receiving a Military Cross in 1944 for an action in which a Cromwell tank under his command knocked out a German tank-destroyer which is now on display at the Imperial War Museum.

Griffiths was called to the Bar, Inner Temple in 1949, and became a Queen's Counsel in 1964. From 1962 to 1964, he was Recorder of Margate, and from 1964 to 1970 of Cambridge. In 1971, Griffiths was knighted and was made Judge of the High Court of Justice, Queen's Bench Division, a post he held until 1980.

Between 1980 and 1985, he was Lord Justice of Appeal, and between 1985 and 1993 Lord of Appeal in Ordinary, and was created, on 23 May 1985, a life peer with the title Baron Griffiths, of Govilon, in the County of Gwent on his appointment.

Griffiths married three times: first Evelyn Krefting in 1949; and after her death in 1998 he married Heather Renwick Brigstocke, the former High Mistress of St Paul's Girls' School, on 22 January 2000. She was killed in a car accident in 2004. She had been created Baroness Brigstocke in 1990; they were one of the few couples who both held titles in their own right. In July 2009, he married Greta Fenston. He had four children by his first wife: three daughters and one son.

He died on 30 May 2015 at the age of 91.

== Other ==
Griffiths holds the distinction of having been both president of Marylebone Cricket Club and captain of The Royal and Ancient Golf Club of St Andrews.

In cricket, Griffiths was a fast bowler. At Cambridge University, he won Blues for cricket in 1946, 1947, and 1948, recording career-best figures of 6 for 129 against Lancashire in 1946. He also made eight appearances in the County Championship for Glamorgan, taking 4 for 61 against Surrey on his debut in 1946. In all, he played 38 first-class matches, taking 102 wickets at an average of 31.47.

== Sources ==
- "DodOnline". Archived from the original on 10 October 2006.
