= The History of the Fairchild Family =

19th-century children's book series by Mary Martha Sherwood

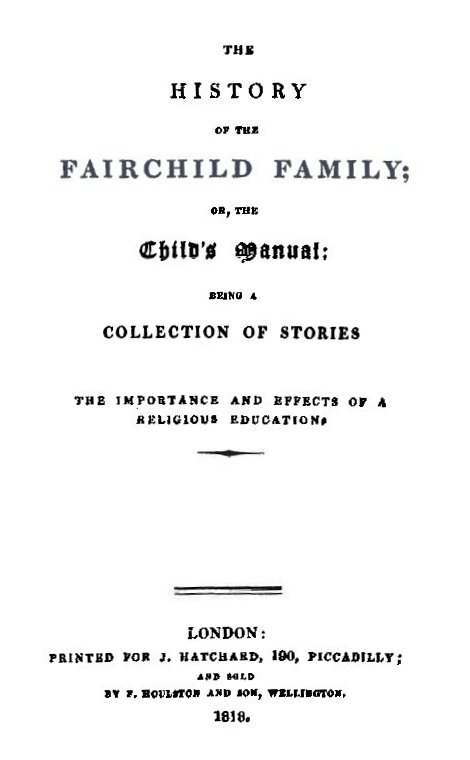
Title page from the first edition of The Fairchild Family, Part I

The History of the Fairchild Family by Mary Martha Sherwood was a series of bestselling children's books in nineteenth-century Britain. The three volumes, published in 1818, 1842 and 1847, detail the lives of the Fairchild children. Part I, which was in print for over a century, focuses on Emily, Lucy and Henry's realization of their "human depravity" (original sin) and their consequent need for redemption; Parts II and III emphasize more worldly lessons such as etiquette and virtuous consumerism.

During the nineteenth century, The Fairchild Family was renowned for its realistic portrayal of childhood and its humour, but Sherwood's book fell from favour as Britain became increasingly secularized and new fashions in children's literature came to dominate the literary scene, represented by works such as Lewis Carroll's Alice's Adventures in Wonderland. In the twentieth century the books have most often been viewed as quintessential examples of the didactic style of children's writing popular before Alice.

== Publication history ==
Sherwood published the first part of The Fairchild Family in 1818 with the firm of John Hatchard in Piccadilly, thereby assuring it "social distinction". Hatchard was associated with the Clapham Sect of evangelicals, which included Hannah More, and his customers were wealthy businessmen, gentry, and Members of Parliament. The book was popular, remaining in print until 1913. Urged by her readers, her printer and her own desire to capitalize on Part I's success, Sherwood published Parts II and III in 1842 and 1847, respectively.

== Structure of the text ==
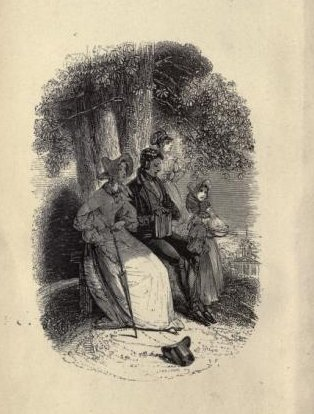
Frontispiece to an 1853 edition of The Fairchild Family

The Fairchild Family, Part I tells the story of a family striving towards godliness and consists of a series of lessons taught by the Fairchild parents to their three children (Emily, Lucy and Henry) regarding not only the proper orientation of their souls towards Heaven but also proper earthly morality (envy, greed, lying, disobedience, and fighting, for example, are immoral). The text incorporates a series of tract-like stories into an overarching narrative in order to illustrate these moral lessons. The stories of the deaths of two neighbourhood children, Charles Trueman and Miss Augusta Noble, for instance, help the Fairchild children to understand how and why they need to prepare their own hearts for salvation. The faithful and "true" Charles has a transcendent deathbed experience (much like Charles Dickens's Little Nell in The Old Curiosity Shop (1840–1)), suggesting that he was saved; by contrast, the heedless and disobedient Augusta, who plays with candles, burns up and is presumably damned.

Parts II and III have a similar structure; an overarching narrative of the Fairchild family is interspersed with inset moral tales. Both are noticeably less evangelical than Part I. Part II begins with the recognition by the Fairchild parents that their children have "a new and divine nature, which works against your evil natures, causing you to know when you have done wrong, and making you truly and deeply sorrowful when you have committed a sin." Emily, Lucy and Henry have finally learned to discipline their own souls. Parts II and III focus to a greater extent on good breeding, virtuous consumption and one's duty to the poor than does Part I. One of the most important lessons that the children learn, for instance, is respect for their elders. Moreover, the gibbet to which the children had been taken to observe a rotting corpse and instructed regarding the spiritual perils of sibling rivalry in Part I, has disappeared in Part II; Henry and his father walk by the spot where it used to stand and note its absence.

In all three books, thematically-relevant prayers and hymns by the likes of Philip Doddridge, Isaac Watts, Charles Wesley, William Cowper and Ann and Jane Taylor follow each chapter.

== Themes ==
=== Evangelicalism ===
The theme that dominates The Fairchild Family, Part I is the evangelical need to recognize one's innate "depravity" and prepare oneself for eternity. In this volume, the most important lessons in life are "faith, resignation, and implicit obedience to the will of God." Sherwood articulates this theology in the very first pages of the book:

Mr. and Mrs. Fairchild loved and feared God, and had done so, by the mercy of God, ever since their younger days. They knew that their hearts were very bad, and that they could not be saved by any good thing they could do: on the contrary, that they were by nature fitted only for everlasting punishment: but they believed in the Lord Jesus Christ, and loved him for having died for them; and they knew he would save them, because he saves all those who trust in him.

The book encourages its readers to adopt these beliefs not only through its stories but also through its prayers:

Hear, therefore, my prayer, O Lord, and send thy Holy Spirit to shew unto me the wickedness of my own heart; that I may hate myself, and know, that, had I my deserts, I should now be living with the devil in hell. [sic]

But unlike previous allegorical literature with these themes, such as John Bunyan's Pilgrim's Progress (1678), Sherwood domesticated her story—all of the actions in the children's day-to-day lives are of supreme importance because they relate directly to their salvation. Emily, for example, succumbs to the temptation to eat some forbidden plums: "no eye was looking at her, but the eye of God, who sees every thing we do, and knows even the secret thoughts of the heart; but Emily, just at that moment, did not think of God."

As Sherwood scholar M. Nancy Cutt argues, "the great overriding metaphor of all [Sherwood's] work is the representation of divine order by the harmonious family relationship (inevitably set in its own pastoral Eden). . . No writer made it clearer to her readers that the child who is dutiful within his family is blessed in the sight of God; or stressed more firmly that family bonds are but the earthly and visible end of a spiritual bond running up to the very throne of God." This is made clear in the Fairchild parents' description of their own authority:

Whilst you are a little child, you must tell your sins to me; and I will shew [sic] you the way by which only you may hope to overcome them: when you are bigger, and I and your papa are removed from you, then you must tell all your sins to God.

Children's literature scholar Patricia Demers has referred to this connection between the family and the divine as the Romantic element in Sherwood's writing, arguing that her "characters' zeal in finding and defining an earthly home prompts their almost automatic longing for a heavenly home. Sherwood's is a consciously double vision, glimpsing the eternal in the natural, the sublime in the quotidian."

All three parts of The Fairchild Family "taught the lessons of personal endurance, reliance on Providence, and acceptance of one's earthly status." Emphasizing individual experience and one's personal relationship with God, they discouraged readers from attributing their successes or failures to "larger economic and political forces." This is particularly true for the poor characters in the texts, such as the Truemans in the first volume and the beggar children, Jane and Edward, in the second volume.

=== Victorianism ===
Parts II and III reflect Sherwood's changing values as well as those of the Victorian period. Significantly, the servants in Part I, "who are almost part of the family, are pushed aside in Part III by their gossiping, flattering counterparts in the fine manor-house." The second two volumes also outline narrower roles for each sex. In Part I Lucy and Emily learn to sew and keep house while Henry tends the garden and learns Latin, but in Part II, Henry's scrapes involve letting loose a bull while the girls focus intently on how to make purchases in an economical yet fair fashion. The most extensive thematic change in the series, however, was the disappearance of its strident evangelicalism. Whereas all of the lessons in Part I highlight the children's "human depravity" and encourage the reader to think in terms of the afterlife, in Parts II and III, other Victorian values such as "respectability" and filial obedience are brought to the fore. Children's literature scholar Janis Dawson describes the difference in terms of parental indulgence; in Parts II and III, the Fairchild parents employ softer disciplinary tactics than in Part I.

== Reception and legacy ==
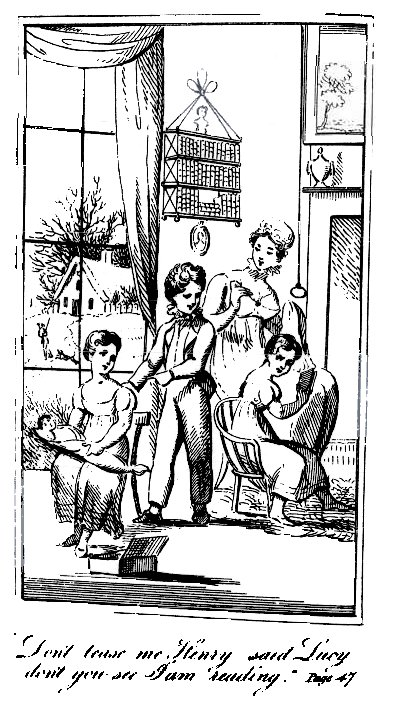
Frontispiece from the first edition of The Fairchild Family, Part I (1818). The illustration reads: "Don't tease me Henry," said Lucy, "don't you see I'm reading?"

The Fairchild Family continued to be a bestseller despite the increasingly popular Wordsworthian image of childhood innocence and the sentimental picture of childhood presented in novels such as Charles Dickens's Oliver Twist (1837–39). One scholar has suggested that it "influenced Dickens's depictions of Pip's fears of the convict, the gibbet, and 'the horrible young man' at the close of Chapter 1" in Great Expectations (1860–61). Children's literature scholar Gillian Avery has argued that The Fairchild Family was "as much a part of English childhood as Alice was later to become." As late as the 1900s, Lord Frederic Hamilton states that he attended a party at which each guest dressed up as a character from the book. Although the book was popular, some scraps of evidence have survived suggesting that readers did not always interpret it as Sherwood would have wanted. Lord Hamilton writes, for instance, that "there was plenty about eating and drinking; one could always skip the prayers, and there were three or four very brightly written accounts of funerals in it."

When the series was republished later in the century, the books were severely edited; often Mr. Fairchild's sermons were removed from Part I and the phrase "human depravity" was replaced with the word "naughtiness." Many of the changes also served to further emphasize the authority of the parents: "as the religious framework was weakened or removed, the parent became the ultimate authority, and the Victorian cult of the family was reinforced in a way that Mrs. Sherwood had never intended."

Although The Fairchild Family has gained a reputation in the twentieth century as an oppressively didactic book, in the early nineteenth century it was viewed as delightfully realistic. It was often described as humorous and Charlotte Mary Yonge (1823–1901), a critic who also wrote children's literature, praised "the gusto with which [Sherwood] dwells on new dolls" and "the absolutely sensational naughtiness" of the children. Although twentieth-century critics have tended to view the tale as harsh (John Rowe Townsend described it as "unspeakably cruel"), often pointing to the Fairchilds' visit to the gibbet, Cutt and others argue that the positive depiction of the nuclear family in the text, particularly Sherwood's emphasis on parents' responsibility to educate their own children, was an important part of the book's appeal. She argues that Sherwood's "influence," via books such as the Fairchild Family, "upon the domestic pattern of Victorian life can hardly be overestimated."

George Orwell had a very negative view. "This evil book is now issued in pretty-pretty expurgated editions, but it is well worth reading in the original version. It gives one some idea of the lengths to which child-discipline was sometimes carried. Mr. Fairchild, for instance, when he catches his children quarrelling, first thrashes them, reciting Dr. Watts's 'Let dogs delight to bark and bite' between blows of the cane, and then takes them to spend the afternoon beneath a gibbet where the rotting corpse of a murderer is hanging.".

== Bibliography ==
- Cutt, M. Nancy. Mrs. Sherwood and her Books for Children. London: Oxford University Press, 1974. ISBN 0-19-278010-7.
- Darton, F. J. Harvey, ed. The Life and Times of Mrs. Sherwood from the Diaries of Captain and Mrs. Sherwood. London: Wells Gardner, Darton & Co., Ltd., [1910].
- Dawson, Janis. "Mary Martha Sherwood." Dictionary of Literary Biography. Vol. 163: 267–281.
- Demers, Patricia. "Mary Martha Sherwood." Oxford Dictionary of National Biography. Retrieved on 21 April 2007. (by subscription only)
- Demers, Patricia. "Mrs. Sherwood and Hesba Stretton: The Letter and Spirit of Evangelical Writing for Children." Romanticism and Children's Literature in Nineteenth-century England. Ed. James Holt McGavran, Jr. Athens: University of Georgia Press, 1991. ISBN 0-8203-1289-4
- Harper, Emily. "'The tormented shadow of the Fairchild children': What Can The History of the Fairchild Family Tell Us About Child-Rearing in the Early Nineteenth Century?" History of Education Researcher 73 (2004): 1–10.
- Rosman, Doreen. Evangelicals and Culture. London: Croom Helm, 1984. ISBN 0-7099-2253-1.
- Royde-Smith, Naomi. The State of Mind of Mrs. Sherwood. London: Macmillan and Co. Ltd., 1946.
- Sherwood, Mary Martha. The History of the Fairchild Family. New York: Garland Publishing, 1977.
- Sherwood, [Mary Martha.] The History of the Fairchild Family; or, The Child's Manual; Being a Collection of Stories Calculated to Show the importance and Effects of a Religious Education. Part II. 2nd ed. London: J. Hatchard and Son, 1845.
- Vallone, Lynne. "'A humble Spirit under Correction': Tracts, Hymns, and the Ideology of Evangelical Fiction for Children, 1780–1820." The Lion and the Unicorn 15 (1991): 72–95.
