= The History of Little Henry and his Bearer =

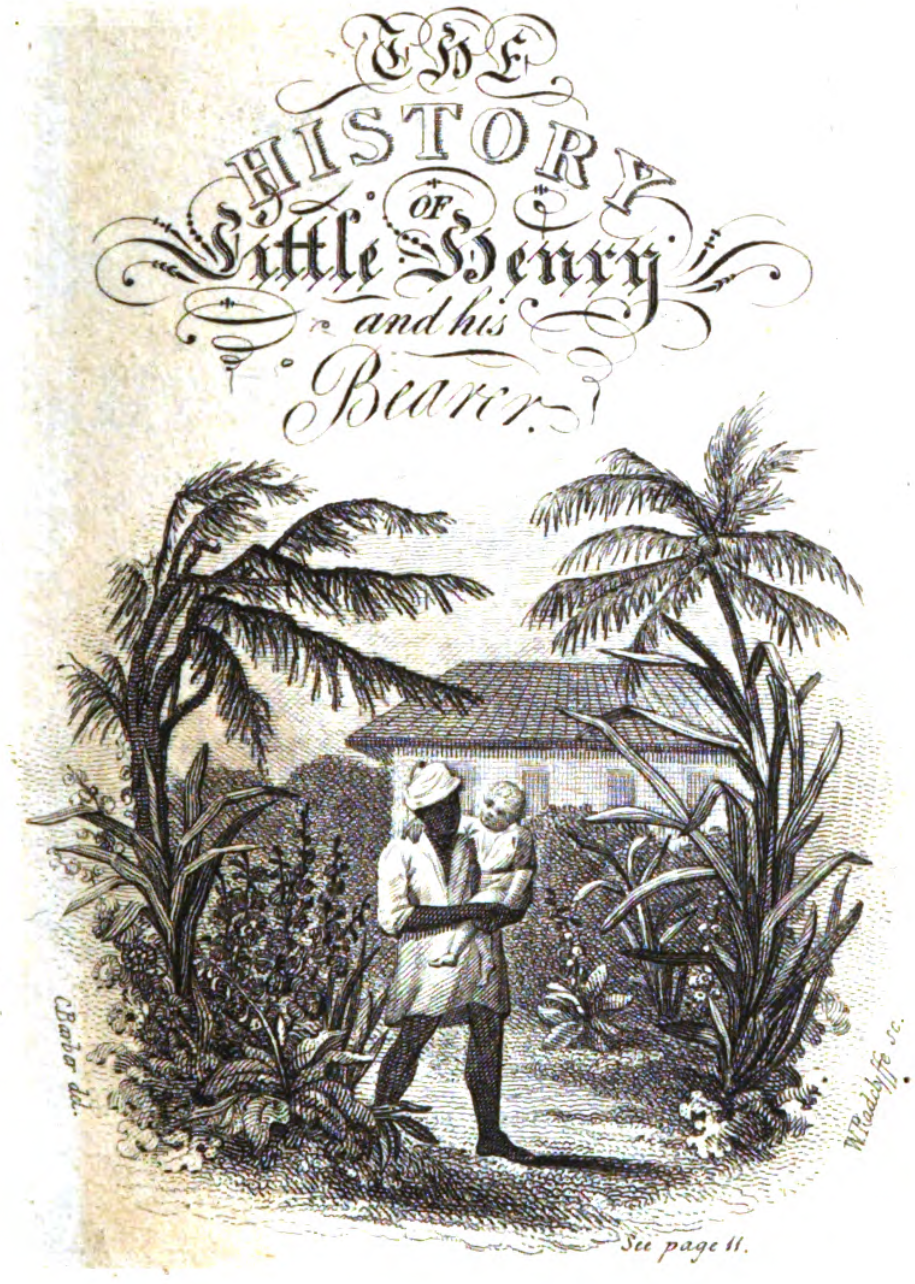
Frontispiece of the 1815 edition of The History of Little Henry and His Bearer

The History of Little Henry and his Bearer (1814) was a popular children's book written by Mary Martha Sherwood. It was continuously in print for 70 years after its initial publication and was translated into French, German, Spanish, Hindustani (1814; 1873), Chinese, Marathi (1853), Tamil (1840), and Sinhalese. Telling the story of a young British boy who, on his deathbed, converts Boosy, the Indian man who has taken care of him throughout his childhood, the book is dominated by colonial and evangelical themes.

== Style ==
Sherwood's tale blends the realistic with the sentimental and introduces her readers to Hindustani words and descriptions of what she felt was authentic Indian life. As children's literature scholar M. Nancy Cutt explains, "with this work, the obituary tract (which invariably stressed conversion and a Christian death) had assumed the colouring of romance".

== Themes ==
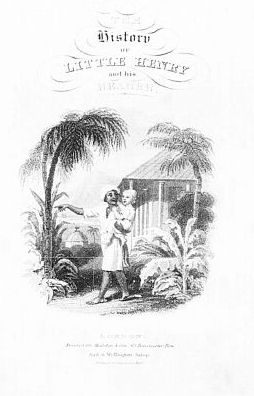
Frontispiece to a later edition of The History of Little Henry and his Bearer (c. 1830).

In 1823 Sherwood published a female version of the story entitled The History of Little Lucy and her Dhaye, although this tale was much less popular than Little Henry, going through only four editions. In both books she "presents the children's intimacy with and love for their Indian caretakers as an early impediment to their development of a strong English identity; she then offers Evangelical Anglican Christianity, with its emphasis on the missionary impulse to convert others, as a solution to that problem". As Dara Regaignon explains, in the two stories "conversion 'saves' Henry and Lucy by teaching them that some religions and cultures are right while others are wrong" and the two children end up "civilizing" their caretakers. Sherwood ties together British identity with Christianity. For example, at the beginning of Little Henry, Henry can only speak Hindustani, but as he learns English he also learns the doctrines of Christianity—"the two are identified with one another entirely: the English language is the medium of the Christian education". When Henry in turn teaches Boosy to read English, he also converts him to Christianity.

Threatened by the specter of European children in India being raised by Indian "bearers" and "dhayes", Regaignon argues, Sherwood provides her readers with stories showing the hero and heroine drawing strength and ultimately domination over their caretakers from those very ties—"in Sherwood's hands, threats to imperial identity ultimately reinforce it." Both Henry and Lucy teach their caretakers, reversing the power dynamic initially established in the story. Henry even turns into a Christ figure, sacrificing his life for Boosy's conversion.

In addition, Sherwood's "stories are meant to inspire their readers to missionary action". In Little Henry, Henry's death is what prompts Boosy's conversion. The last line of the book urges its readers to follow Henry's example: "Little children in India, remember Henry L—, and go and do likewise" (emphasis in original). However, as Regaignon argues, Henry's conversion is also "a kind of synecdoche for the shift of British imperial attitudes from orientalism to anglicization that occurred in the first decades of the nineteenth century". At the time that Little Henry was published, evangelicals were gaining political influence in Britain; Warren Hastings, the former governor-general of India, had just been impeached; and the Charter Act 1813 allowed for the beginning of missionary activities in India. Not only were its readers receptive to its message, it helped to make the conviction that the spreading of Christianity "was a matter of moral truth appealing and persuasive to generations of children".

Using a postcolonial analysis, Nandini Bhattacharya emphasizes the complex relationship between Sherwood's evangelicalism and her colonialism. She argues that Sherwood's evangelical stories demonstrate the deep colonial "mistrust of feminized agency," represented by a dying child in Little Henry and his Bearer. Henry "subvert[s] the colonialist's fantasy of universal identity by generating a subaltern identity that mimics and explodes that fantasy." But, ultimately, Bhattacharya argues, Sherwood creates neither a completely colonialist text nor a subaltern text; the deaths of children such as Henry eliminate any possibility for an alternative consciousnesses to mature.

== Publication history ==
Written in 1810 when Sherwood was living in India and published in England in 1814, Little Henry went through 18 printings between 1814 and 1824 alone. It appeared every three years (on average) until 1883. The book was also popular in the United States in the first half of the nineteenth century, until 1852 when Uncle Tom's Cabin superseded it. One scholar has suggested that Harriet Beecher Stowe used Henry as a model for "Little Eva" in her novel, but Regaignon argues that racial histories underlying the two countries are too different for this influence to make much sense.

In 1842 Sherwood published The Last Days of Boosy, a sequel to Little Henry. As Regaignon explains, it is "markedly different" in "style, tone, and doctrine" from the previous book. It does not cite the Bible as frequently and God is depicted much less sternly. While Little Henry is part of what Cutt has referred to as Sherwood's "Evangelical period", The Last Days of Boosy is not.

== Bibliography ==
- Bhattacharya, Nandini. “Maternal Plots, Colonialist Fictions: Colonial Pedagogy in Mary Martha Sherwood’s Children’s Stories.” Nineteenth-Century Contexts 23 (2001): 381–415.
- Cutt, M. Nancy. Mrs. Sherwood and her Books for Children. London: Oxford University Press, 1974. ISBN 0-19-278010-7.
- Dawson, Janis. "Mary Martha Sherwood." Dictionary of Literary Biography. Vol. 163: 267–281.
- Demers, Patricia. "Mary Martha Sherwood". Oxford Dictionary of National Biography. Retrieved on 21 April 2007.
- Khorana, Meena. The Indian Subcontinent in Literature for Children and Young Adults: An Annotated Bibliography of English Language Books. New York: Greenwood, 1991.
- Plotz, Judith. "Literary Ways of Killing a Child: the Nineteenth-century Practice". Aspects and Issues in the History of Children's Literature. Ed. Maria Nikolajeva. Westport, CT: Greenwood, 1995.
- Regaignon, Dara Rossman. "Intimacy's Empire: Children, Servants, and Missionaries in Mary Martha Sherwood's 'Little Henry and his Bearer'". Children's Literature Association Quarterly 26.2 (2001): 84–95.
- Steel, Flora Annie, "Little Henry and his Bearer". Atlantic Monthly 82 (December 1898): 814–22.
