= George Butt (priest) =

- Born: 26 December 1741; Lichfield, England
- Died: 30 September 1795 (aged 53); Stanford-on-Teme, England
- Education: University of Oxford
- Spouse: Martha Butt (m. 1773)
- Children: 3, including: Mary Martha Sherwood; Lucy Lyttelton Cameron
- Relatives: Henry Salt (nephew)

George Butt (26 December 1741 – 30 September 1795) was a British poet, teacher, cleric. He became George III's Chaplain-in-Ordinary. He and his wife Martha had three children and to varying degrees they were all writers.

== Life ==
Butt was born 26 December 1741 in Lichfield to Carey Butt. a surgeon, apothecary and descendant of the court physician William Butts, and Elizabeth Butt (née Marten). Baptised at St Mary's Church on 30 December, Butt had at least one sister, Alice Salt (née Butt), through whom he was the uncle of the diplomat, collector and Egyptologist Henry Salt.

He went to Westminster School followed by University of Oxford. He graduated and took a masters in 1768 but he did not become a Doctor of Divinity until 1793. Butt's first job was as rector at Leigh in Staffordshire. This was a position arranged by Sir Walter Bagot. He was taken on by Sir Edward Winnington who employed him as a tutor for his son and after he had him accompany him to the same college that Butt had graduated from in Oxford. After that Winnington found Butt a rector's job at Stanford-on-Teme and built him a rectory.

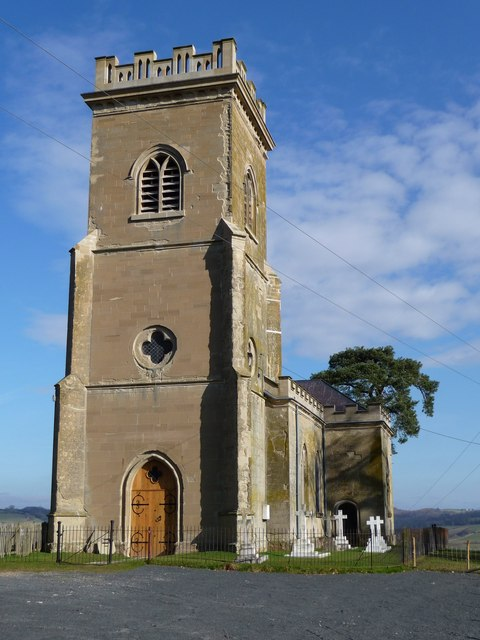
St Mary's Church at Stanford where Butt was the rector

In 1773 he married a London silk merchants daughter, Martha Sherwood. His new wife rearranged his poor finances and she arranged for him to take in well-off pupils. This transformed his poor financial position. He and his wife Martha had three children and to varying degrees they were all writers. Mary Martha was born in 1775 and Lucy Lyttelton was born in 1781.

In 1778 he was rewarded with the living of the vicarage of Newchurch on the Isle of Wight. This was a gift of the Bishop of Bristol, Thomas Newton, and in 1783 he exchanged this living for a similar one at Notgrove in Gloucestershire. He also became George III's Chaplain-in-Ordinary in 1783.

In 1787 he was chosen to be the vicar of Kidderminster which was a job he did in addition to his other appointments. He briefly moved there, but then returned to Stanford and commuted where necessary.

Butt died in Stanford-on-Teme in 1795.

== Works ==
From 1762, Butt regularly published both sermons and poems. The poems were not well regarded and the book that he was working on at his death, The Spanish Daughter, was completed and published by his elder daughter together with a memoir in 1824. The book was not rated well either.
