= Mary Martha Sherwood =

English children's author and editor (1775–1851)

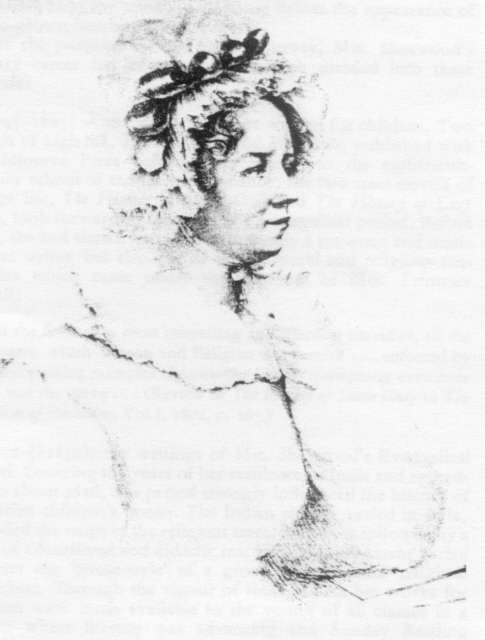
- Born: Mary Martha Butt; 6 May 1775; Stanford-on-Teme, Worcestershire, England
- Died: 22 October 1851 (aged 76); Twickenham, London, England
- Occupation: Writer (novelist)
- Writing career
- Period: 1814–1848
- Genre: Children's literature

Mary Martha Sherwood (née Butt; 6 May 1775 – 22 September 1851) was an English children's writer. Of her more than four hundred works, the best known include The History of Little Henry and his Bearer (1814) and the two series The History of Henry Milner (1822–1837) and The History of the Fairchild Family (1818–1847). Her evangelicalism permeated her early writings, but later works cover common Victorian themes, such as domesticity.

Mary Martha Butt married Captain Henry Sherwood and moved to India for eleven years. She converted to evangelical Christianity, opened schools for the children of army officers and local Indian children, adopted neglected or orphaned children, and founded an orphanage. She was inspired to write fiction for the children in the military encampments. Her work was well received in Britain, where the Sherwoods returned in 1816 for medical reasons. She opened a boarding school, edited a children's magazine, and published hundreds of tracts, novels, and other works for children and the poor, which increased her popularity in both the United States and Britain. She died in 1851 in Twickenham, Middlesex.

Sherwood's career included three periods: her romantic period (1795–1805), her evangelical period (1810 – c. 1830), in which she produced her most popular and influential works, and her post-evangelical period (c. 1830–1851). Themes in her writing included "her conviction of inherent human corruption", her belief that literature "had a catechetical utility" for every rank of society, her belief that "the dynamics of family life" should reflect central Christian principles, and her "virulent" anti-Catholicism. Sherwood was called "one of the most significant authors of children's literature of the nineteenth century". Her depictions of domesticity and ties with India may have influenced many young readers, but her work fell from favour as children's literature broadened in the late nineteenth century.

== Early life ==
Mary Martha Butt was born on 6 May 1775 in Stanford-on-Teme, Worcestershire, the eldest daughter and second child of Martha Butt and Reverend George Butt, the chaplain in ordinary to George III. As a young child, before the age of six, Sherwood composed stories in her head before she could write and begged her mother to copy them down. Her brother was her constant companion. She was forced to stand in the stocks while doing her lessons:

It was the fashion then for children to wear iron collars round the neck, with back-boards strapped over the shoulders. To one of these I was subjected from my sixth to my thirteenth year. I generally did all my lessons standing in stocks, with this same collar round my neck; it was put on in the morning, and seldom taken off till late in the evening. ... And yet I was a very happy child, and when relieved from my collars I not unseldom manifested my delight by starting from our hall-door and taking a run for half a mile through the woods.

— Mary Martha Sherwood, "The Life and Times of Mrs. Sherwood".

Sherwood's and her sister Lucy Lyttelton's education was wide-ranging for girls in the late eighteenth century: Sherwood learnt Latin and Greek and was allowed to read freely in her father's library. Sherwood states in her autobiography that by the age of thirteen, she had reached her full height, but her mother continued to dress her like a child, so she hid in the woods with a book and a doll. Despite her lonely childhood, she seems to have enjoyed attending Madame St. Quentin's School for Girls at Reading Abbey, which was run by French émigrés and also attended by Jane Austen.

Sherwood spent some of her teenage years in Lichfield, where she enjoyed the company of the naturalist Erasmus Darwin, the educational reformer Richard Lovell Edgeworth, his daughter Maria Edgeworth, and the poet Anna Seward. Although she was intellectually stimulated by them, she was distressed by their lack of faith and later described Richard Edgeworth as an "infidel". She also criticized Seward's persona of the female author, writing in her autobiography that she would never model herself on a woman who wore a wig and accumulated male flatterers. She was determined to become a writer and her father encouraged her. When she was 17, her father helped her publish her first story, Traditions (1795).

When Sherwood's father died in 1795, her family retired from active social life, since her mother preferred seclusion, and moved to Bridgnorth, Shropshire, into "a somewhat uncomfortable house" in the town's High Street. At Bridgnorth Sherwood began writing sentimental novels; in 1802 she sold Margarita for £40 to Mr. Hazard of Bath, and The History of Susan Grey, a Pamela-like novel, for £10. She also taught at a local Sunday school.

== Marriage and India ==
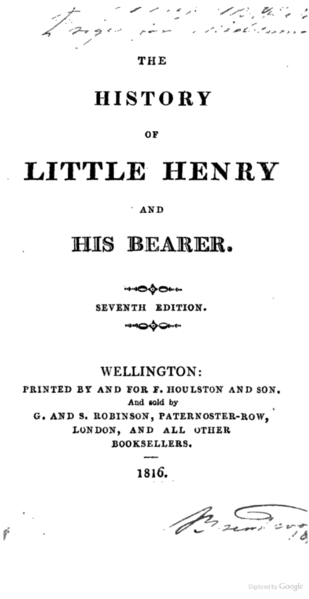
Title page from the seventh edition of Little Henry and His Bearer

In 1799, Sherwood married her cousin, Captain Henry Sherwood. For several years, she accompanied her husband and his regiment, the 53rd Foot, on postings throughout Britain. In 1804, he was promoted to paymaster, which slightly improved their finances. In 1805 the regiment was ordered to India and the Sherwoods were forced to leave behind their first child, Mary Henrietta, with Sherwood's mother and sister in England.

Sherwood's four-month voyage to India was hard; she was pregnant again and the regiment's ship was attacked by French warships. The Sherwoods stayed in India for eleven years, moving with the army and a growing family from Calcutta (Kolkata) to Dinapore (Danapur), Berhampore (Baharampur), Cawnpore (Kanpur) and Meerut. They had six children there: Henry (1805–1807), Lucy Martha (1807–1808), Lucy Elizabeth (1809–1835), Emily (1811–1833), Henry Martyn, who became a minister (1813 – 21 January 1912), and Sophia (born 1815).

After the death of her second child, Henry, of whooping cough, Sherwood began to consider converting to evangelical Christianity. The missionary Henry Martyn (after whom she had named her sixth child) finally convinced her, but it was the chaplain to the company who first made her aware of her "human depravity" and need for redemption. After her conversion, she was anxious to pursue evangelical missionary work in India, but she first had to persuade the East India Company that its policy of religious neutrality was ill-conceived. The social and political support for missionary programmes in Britain eventually persuaded the company to approve her endeavours. Sherwood set up schools for the children of army officers and for the local Indian children attached to the camp. They were often taught in her home because no buildings were available. The first school began with 13 children and grew to over 40, with pupils ranging from the very young to adolescents; uneducated soldiers attended at times. Sherwood discovered that traditional British teaching materials did not appeal to children raised in India and so wrote her own Indian and army-themed stories, such as The History of Little Henry and his Bearer (1814) and The Memoirs of Sergeant Dale, his Daughter and the Orphan Mary (1815).

Sherwood adopted neglected or orphaned children from the camp. In 1807 she adopted a three-year-old who had been given too much medicinal gin and in 1808 a malnourished two-year-old. She found homes for those she could not adopt and founded an orphanage. In 1816, on medical advice, she and her family returned to Britain. Sherwood relates in her autobiography that she was continually ill in India; it was believed at the time that neither she nor her children could survive in a tropical climate.

== Return to Britain and death ==
When the Sherwoods returned to Britain, they were financially strapped. Captain Sherwood, having been put on half-pay, opened a school in Henwick, Worcestershire. Relying on her fame as an author and her teaching experience in India, Sherwood decided to establish a boarding school for girls in Wick; it remained in operation for eight years. She taught English, French, astronomy, history, geography, grammar, writing and arithmetic. At the same time, she wrote hundreds of tracts, novels, and other works for children and the poor, increasing her popularity in both the United States and Britain. The History of Henry Milner (1822) was one of Sherwood's most successful books; children sent her fan mail, begging her to write a sequel; one child sent her "ornamental pens" with which to do so. Babies were named after the hero. Sherwood published much of what she wrote in The Youth's Magazine, a children's periodical that she edited for over 20 years.

By the 1830s, the Sherwoods had become more prosperous and the family decided to travel to the European continent. The texts that Sherwood wrote following this trip reflect her exposure to French culture. She also embarked on a large and complex Old Testament project at this time, for which she learned Hebrew. To assist her, her husband assembled, over the course of ten years, a large Hebrew-English concordance. Sherwood's autobiography provides few details of the last approximately forty years of her life, although even in her seventies, Sherwood wrote for four or five hours a day; many of the books were co-authored with Sherwood's daughter, Sophia. According to M. Nancy Cutt, a Sherwood scholar, this joint authorship led to a "watery sentimentality" not evident in Sherwood's earlier works as well as a greater emphasis on issues of class.

In 1849, the Sherwoods moved to Twickenham, Middlesex, and in December of that year Captain Sherwood died. Sherwood herself died almost two years later on 20 September 1851.

== Literary analysis ==
Sherwood scholar M. Nancy Cutt has argued that Sherwood's career divides into three periods: (1) her romantic period (1795–1805), in which she wrote a few sentimental novels, (2) her evangelical period (1810 – c. 1830), in which she produced her most popular and influential works, and (3) her post-evangelical period (c. 1830–1851). Several underlying themes pervade most of Sherwood's works through these periods: "her conviction of inherent human corruption", her belief that literature "had a catechetical utility" for every rank of society, her belief that "the dynamics of family life" should reflect central Christian principles, and her "virulent" anti-Catholicism.

=== Early writings: Sentimental novels ===
Sherwood's earliest works are the sentimental novels Traditions (1795) and Margarita (1795). Both are more worldly than her later works, but neither received much recognition. By contrast, The History of Susan Gray, written for the girls of her Sunday school class in Bridgnorth, made Sherwood a famous author. Like Hannah More's tracts, it is designed to teach middle-class morality to the poor. This novel, which children's literature scholar Patricia Demers, describes as a "purified Pamela", tells the story of Susan, an orphaned servant girl who "resists the advances of a philandering soldier; though trembling with emotion at the man's declaration of love and promise of marriage". Susan's story is told from her deathbed, so the reader is regularly reminded of the "wages of sin". A separate narrator, seemingly Sherwood, often interrupts the tale to warn readers against particular actions, such as deceiving themselves that God will spare "bad women" because there are so many of them. Despite a didactic tone that is often distasteful to modern readers, Susan Gray was so popular at the time of its publication that it was pirated by several publishers. In 1816, Sherwood published a revised version, which Sarah Trimmer reviewed positively in The Guardian of Education. Sherwood wrote a companion story to Susan Gray, The History of Lucy Clare, which was published in 1810.

=== French literary influences ===
Although Sherwood disagreed with the principles espoused by French Revolutionaries, her own works are modelled on French children's literature, much of it infused with Rousseauvian ideals. For example, in The History of Henry Milner, Part I (1822) and The History of the Fairchild Family, Part I (1818), Sherwood adopts Arnaud Berquin's "habitual pattern of small domestic situations acted out by children under the eye of parents or fellows". Likewise, The Lady of the Manor (1823–1829) shares similar themes and structures with Madame de Genlis' Tales of the Castle (1785). David Hanson, a scholar of nineteenth-century literature, has questioned this interpretation, arguing that the tales told by the maternal figure in The Lady of the Manor demonstrate a "distrust of parents", and of mothers in particular, because they illustrate the folly of overly permissive parenting. In these inset stories, only outsiders discipline children correctly.

One of Sherwood's aims in her evangelically-themed The History of Henry Milner (1822–1837) was to challenge what she saw as the irreligion inherent in French pedagogy. Henry Milner was written in response to Thomas Day's The History of Sandford and Merton (1783–1789), a novel founded on the philosophy of Rousseau (whose writings Sherwood had lambasted as "the well-spring of infidelity"). The children's literature scholar Janis Dawson indicates that the structure and emphasis of Henry much resemble Rousseau's Emile (1762): their pedagogies are similar, even if their underlying assumptions about childhood conflict. Both books isolate the child in order to encourage learning from the natural world, but Sherwood's Henry is naturally depraved, while Rousseau's Emile is naturally good. As the series progressed, Sherwood's views of religion changed (she became a universalist), causing her to place greater emphasis on childhood innocence in later volumes.

=== Evangelicalism ===
The strongest themes in Sherwood's early evangelical writings are the need to recognize one's innate "depravity" and the need to prepare for eternity. For Sherwood, her main themes emphasize "faith, resignation, and implicit obedience to the will of God". In her adaptation of John Bunyan's Pilgrim's Progress (1678), The Infant's Progress (1821), she represents original sin as a child named "In-bred Sin" who tempts the young pilgrims on their way to the Celestial City (Heaven). It is these battles with In-bred Sin that constitute the major conflict of the text. The allegory is complex and, as Demers admits, "tedious" for even the "willing reader". According to Demers, "some young readers may have found [In-bred Sin's] activities more interesting than the spiritual struggles of the little heroes, reading the book as an adventure story rather than as a guide to salvation". Such religious allegory, though not always so overt, continued to be a favourite literary device of Sherwood's.

Sherwood infused her works with political and social messages dear to evangelicals in the 1810s and 1820s, such as the crucial role of missions, the value of charity, the evils of slavery, and the need for Sabbath observance. She wrote biblically-based introductions to astronomy and ancient history so that children would have Christian textbooks. As Cutt argues, "the intent of these (as indeed of all Evangelical texts) was to offset the deistic tendency to consider knowledge an end in itself". She revised classic children's books on religious grounds, such as Sarah Fielding's The Governess (1749). These efforts to make religion more palatable through children's fiction were not always seen favourably by the evangelical community; The Evangelical Magazine reviewed harshly her Stories Explanatory of the Church Catechism (1817), complaining it was overly reliant on exciting fictional tales to convey its religious message.

==== The History of the Fairchild Family (1818–1847) ====
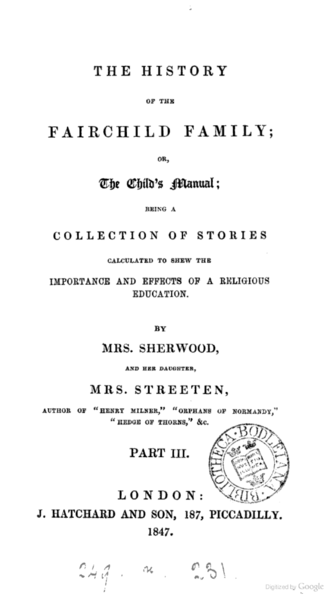
Title page from Part III of The Fairchild Family

As Cutt argues, "the great overriding metaphor of all [Sherwood's] work is the representation of divine order by the harmonious family relationship (inevitably set in its own pastoral Eden). ... No writer made it clearer to her readers that the child who is dutiful within his family is blessed in the sight of God; or stressed more firmly that family bonds are but the earthly and visible end of a spiritual bond running up to the very throne of God". (Note: See also Vallone 1991, p. 85 and Harper 2004, p. 4.) Demers has referred to this "consciously double vision" as the quintessentially Romantic element of Sherwood's writing.

Of all Sherwood's evangelically themed books, The History of the Fairchild Family was the most popular. It was published by John Hatchard of Piccadilly, which gave it and the other ten other books published with him a "social distinction" not attached to her other publications. The Fairchild Family tells the story of a family striving towards godliness and consists of a series of lessons taught by the Fairchild parents to their three children (Emily, Lucy and Henry) regarding not only the proper orientation of their souls towards Heaven but also the right earthly morality (envy, greed, lying, disobedience, and fighting are immoral). The overarching narrative of the tale includes a series of tract-like stories that illustrate these moral lessons. For example, stories of the deaths of two neighbourhood children, Charles Trueman and Miss Augusta Noble, help the Fairchild children to understand how and why they need to look to the state of their own hearts. The faithful and "true" Charles has a transcendent deathbed experience, suggesting he is saved; by contrast, the heedless, disobedient Augusta burns up while playing with candles and is presumably damned. Unlike previous allegorical literature with these themes, such as Bunyan's Pilgrim's Progress, Sherwood domesticated her story with actions in the children's day-to-day lives, such as stealing fruit. These are important because they relate directly to their salvation. Each chapter includes thematically linked prayers and hymns, by Philip Doddridge, Isaac Watts, Charles Wesley, William Cowper, Ann and Jane Taylor, and others.

The Fairchild Family remained in print until 1913, despite the increasingly popular Wordsworthian image of childhood innocence. Dickensian scholar Lois E. Chaney has suggested that it "influenced Dickens's depictions of Pip's fears of the convict, the gibbet, and 'the horrible young man' at the close of Chapter 1" in Great Expectations (1860–1861). The children's literature scholar Gillian Avery has argued that The Fairchild Family was "as much a part of English childhood as Alice was later to become". (Note: Quoted in Harper 2004, p. 3.) Although the book was popular, some scraps of evidence have survived suggesting that readers did not always interpret it as Sherwood would have wanted. Lord Frederic Hamilton writes, for instance, that "there was plenty about eating and drinking; one could always skip the prayers, and there were three or four very brightly written accounts of funerals in it". Although The Fairchild Family has gained a reputation in the twentieth century as didactic, in the early nineteenth century it was viewed as delightfully realistic. Charlotte Mary Yonge (1823–1901), a critic who also wrote children's literature, praised "the gusto with which [Sherwood] dwells on new dolls" and "the absolutely sensational naughtiness" of the children. (Note: See also Rosman 1984, pp. 114–115.) Most twentieth-century critics, including George Orwell, who called it "an evil book", have condemned the book's harshness, pointing to the Fairchilds' moral-filled visit to a gibbet with a rotting corpse swinging from it; but Cutt and others argue that the positive depiction of the nuclear family in the text, particularly Sherwood's emphasis on parents' responsibility to educate their own children, was important to the book's appeal. (Note: See also Harper 2004, p. 5.) She argues that Sherwood's "influence", through books such as the Fairchild Family, "upon the domestic pattern of Victorian life can hardly be overestimated".

The Fairchild Family was so successful that Sherwood wrote two sequels, in 1842 and 1847. These reflected her changing values as well as those of the Victorian period. Significantly, the servants in Part I, "who are almost part of the family, are pushed aside in Part III by their gossiping, flattering counterparts in the fine manor-house." The most extensive thematic change in the series was the disappearance of evangelicalism. Whereas all the lessons in Part I highlight the children's "human depravity" and encourage the reader to think in terms of the afterlife, in Parts II and III, other Victorian values such as "respectability" and filial obedience come to the fore. Dawson describes the difference in terms of parental indulgence; in Parts II and III, the Fairchild parents employ softer disciplinary tactics than in Part I.

==== Evangelical tract literature in the 1820s and 1830s ====
During the 1820s and 1830s, Sherwood wrote a great many tracts for the poor. Like her novels for the middle class, they "taught the lessons of personal endurance, reliance on Providence, and acceptance of one's earthly status". Emphasizing individual experience and one's personal relationship with God, they discouraged readers from attributing their successes or failures to "larger economic and political forces". In this, they resembled the Cheap Repository Tracts, many written by Hannah More. As Linda Peterson, a scholar of nineteenth-century women's literature, argues, Sherwood's tracts use a Biblical "interpretative frame" to highlight the fleetingness of earthly things. For example, in A Drive in the Coach through the Streets of London (1819), Julia is granted the privilege of shopping with her mother only if she will "behave wisely in the streets" and "not give [her] mind to self-pleasing". (Note: Quoted in Peterson 2009, p. 417.) She cannot keep this promise and she eagerly peeks in at every store window and begs her mother to buy her everything she sees. Her mother, therefore, allows her to select one item from every shop. Julia, ecstatic, chooses blue satin boots, a penknife, and a new hat with flowers, and other items until the pair reach the undertaker's shop. There her mood droops considerably and she realizes the moral of the lesson, recited by her mother, as she picks out a coffin: "but she that liveth in pleasure is dead while she liveth" (1 Timothy 5:6).

==== Anti-Catholicism in the 1830s ====
Sherwood's anti-Catholicism appears most obviously in her works from the 1820s and 1830s. During the 1820s in Britain, Catholics were agitating for greater civil rights and it was at this time that Sherwood wrote her most sustained attacks against them. When the Roman Catholic Relief Act 1829 was passed, Sherwood and many like her were frightened of the influence Catholics might gain in the government and wrote Victoria (1833), The Nun (1833), and The Monk of Cimies (1834) to illustrate some of the supposed dangers of Catholicism. The Monk narrates, in the first person, Edmund Etherington's decision to renounce the Church of England and join the Catholic church. While a monk, he ridicules his fellow brothers, plans a murder and debauches a young woman. Some evangelicals disagreed with her views on Catholic Emancipation and were uncomfortable with these books; one evangelical reviewer called The Monk of Cimies "unfair and unconvincing".

=== Colonialism ===
While in India, Sherwood wrote a series of texts based on colonial life. Her most popular, The History of Little Henry and his Bearer (1814), tells of a young British boy who, on his deathbed, converts Boosy, the Indian man who has taken care of him throughout his childhood. The book was enormously successful; it reached 37 editions by 1850 and was translated into French, German, Spanish, Hindustani, Chinese, and Sinhalese. Sherwood's tale blends the realistic with the sentimental and introduces her readers to Hindustani words and descriptions of what she felt was authentic Indian life. As Cutt explains, "With this work, the obituary tract (which invariably stressed conversion and a Christian death) had assumed the colouring of romance." Sherwood also wrote a companion story titled Little Lucy and her Dhaye (1825) that told a similar tale.

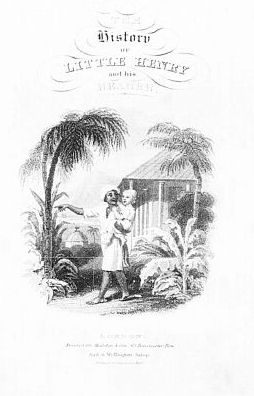
Frontispiece to a later edition of The History of Little Henry and his Bearer (c. 1830)

The Indian Pilgrim (1818) demonstrates Sherwood's religious biases: "Muslims and Jews receive better treatment than Hindus because of their belief in one God, but Roman Catholics fare little better than the Hindu idolaters." The Indian Pilgrim, though never published in India, was popular in Britain and America. Sherwood also wrote texts for Indian servants of British families in the style of British writings for the poor. One such was The Ayah and Lady (1813) in which the ayah or maid is "portrayed as sly, selfish, lazy, and untrustworthy. Her employers are well aware of her faults, yet they tolerate her". A more culturally sensitive and realistic portrayal of Indians appears in The Last Days of Boosy (1842), a sequel to The History of Little Henry and his Bearer, where the converted Boosy is cast out of his family and community after his conversion to Christianity.

Sherwood's writings on India reveal her sense of superiority over the inhabitants of India; the subcontinent therefore appears in her works as a morally corrupt land in need of reformation. She wrote The History of George Desmond (1821) to warn young men of the dangers of emigrating to India. Sherwood's books shaped the minds of several generations of young Britons. According to Cutt, Sherwood's depictions of India were among the few available to young British readers; such children "acquired a strong conviction of the rightness of missions, which, while it inculcated sincere concern for, and a genuine kindness towards an alien people for whom Britain was responsible, quite destroyed any latent respect for Indian tradition."

Using a postcolonial analysis, Nandini Bhattacharya emphasizes the complex relationship between Sherwood's evangelicalism and her colonialism. She argues that Sherwood's evangelical stories demonstrate the deep colonial "mistrust of feminized agency", represented by a dying child in Little Henry and his Bearer. Henry "subvert[s] the colonialist's fantasy of universal identity by generating a subaltern identity that mimics and explodes that fantasy". But ultimately, Bhattacharya argues, Sherwood creates neither a wholly colonialist text nor a post-colonial text; the deaths of children such as Henry eliminate any possibility for an alternative consciousnesses to mature.

=== Later writings: Victorianism ===
By 1830, Sherwood's works had drifted from evangelicalism and reflected more conventional Victorian plots and themes. For example, Gipsy Babes (1826), perhaps inspired by Walter Scott's Guy Mannering (1815), emphasizes "human affections". In 1835, she wrote a Gothic novel for adolescents entitled Shanty the Blacksmith, which Cutt calls "a gripping [and] exciting tale" and employs the tropes of the genre: "lost heir, ruined castle, humble helpers and faithful retainer, sinister and mysterious gypsies, prisoner and plot". In 1835, Sherwood published the novel Caroline Mordaunt, about a young woman forced to become a governess. Her parents die when she is young, but luckily relatives pay to educate her, so she can earn her own living. It follows her progress from a flighty, discontented girl to a reliable, content woman; she learns to accommodate herself to the whims of a proud nobility, silly literati, and dogmatic evangelicals. She realizes that in her dependent position she must be content with less than complete happiness. Once she recognizes this, though, she finds God, and in the last chapter an ideal husband, so granting her near-complete happiness after all. Cutt suggests that in these works, Sherwood drew on Jane Austen and Jane Taylor for a new "lively, humorous, and satirical strain".

In both later works such as Caroline Mordaunt and her earlier evangelical texts, Sherwood followed the Victorian project of prescribing gender roles; while her later works outlined ever more stringent and narrow roles for each sex, her early works such as The Fairchild Family suggested demarcations as well: Lucy and Emily learn to sew and keep house while Henry tends the garden and learns Latin.

== Legacy ==
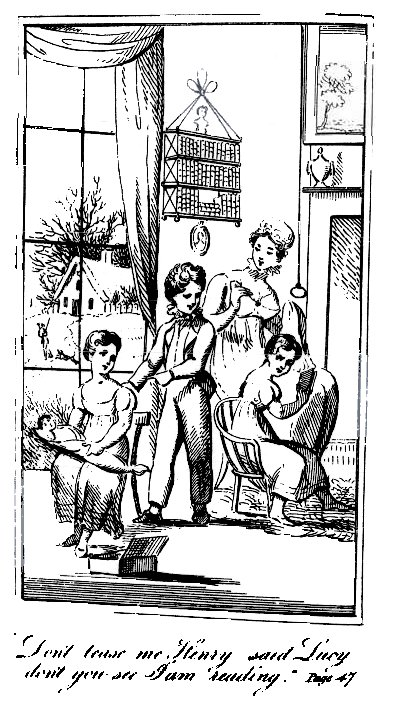
Frontispiece to the first edition of The Fairchild Family, Part I

As Britain's education system became more secular in the later nineteenth century, Sherwood's evangelical books were used mainly to teach the poor and in Sunday schools. Her missionary stories were the most influential of all her works, for according to Cutt, they "kept alive the missionary spirit and perpetuated that paternal attitude towards India that lasted into the [twentieth century], were widely imitated" and "an unfortunate assumption of racial superiority was fostered by the over-simplification of some of Mrs. Sherwood's successors". They influenced Charlotte Maria Tucker ("A.L.O.E.") and even perhaps Rudyard Kipling. In the United States, Sherwood's early works were popular and republished well into the 1840s; thereafter a tradition of specifically American children's literature began to develop with authors such as Louisa May Alcott. Sherwood was also instrumental in developing the ideology of the Victorian family. Cutt acknowledges that "the omniscient Victorian parent was not the creation of Mrs. Sherwood, but of the Victorians themselves; nevertheless, by presenting the parent as God's vicar in the family, she had planted and fostered the idea".

The prevalence of death in Sherwood's early stories and vivid portrayal of its worldly and otherworldly consequences have often caused twentieth-century critics to deride her works. However, Sherwood's stories influenced the styles for other writers such as Charles Kingsley and Charlotte Mary Yonge. It has been surmised that John Ruskin used Henry Milner as the basis for his imaginative autobiography Praeterita (1885–1889). Sherwood's narrative experiments with various genres allowed other writers to pursue innovative forms of children's fiction. Her imaginative use of tracts domesticated reformist literature and encouraged radicals such as Harriet Martineau to employ the same genre, although for opposite purposes. Due to the popularity of Sherwood's works and their impact on later writers, Janis Dawson writes: "Though her books are no longer widely read, she is regarded as one of the most significant authors of children's literature of the nineteenth century".

== Selected works ==
- The History of Little Henry and his Bearer, 1814
- The History of Susan Gray, 1815, revised
- Stories Explanatory of the Church Catechism, 1817
- The History of the Fairchild Family, 1818
- The Indian Pilgrim, 1818
- An Introduction to Geography, 1818
- A Drive in the Coach through the Streets of London A Story Founded on Fact, 1819
- The Governess, or The Little Female Academy, 1820
- The History of George Desmond, 1821
- The Infant's Progress, 1821, 2nd edition
- The History of Henry Milner, 1822
- The History of Little Lucy and her Dhaye, 1823
- The Lady of the Manor, 1823–1829
- Soffrona and her Cat Muff, 1828
- Scripture Prints, with Explanations in the Form of Familiar Dialogues, 1831
- The Monk of Cimies, 1834
- Caroline Mordaunt, or The Governess, 1835
- Shanty the Blacksmith, 1835
- The Last Days of Boosy, the Bearer of Little Henry 1842
- The Youth's Magazine (1822–1848) – "This periodical ... brought out tales, tracts, and articles by Mrs. Sherwood for over twenty-five years (signed at first M.M., and after 1827, M.M.S.) The earlier tales were rapidly reprinted by Houlston, Darton, Melrose, Knight and Lacey and the R.T.S. [Religious Tract Society], as well as by various American publishers".
- The Works of Mrs. Sherwood by Harper & Bros. (1834–1857) – collected works

== Works cited ==
- Bhattacharya, Nandini (2001). "Maternal Plots, Colonialist Fictions: Colonial Pedagogy in Mary Martha Sherwood's Children's Stories". Nineteenth-Century Contexts. 23 (3): 381–415. doi:10.1080/08905490108583549. PMID 18700311. S2CID 26494582.
- Cutt, M. Nancy (1974). Mrs. Sherwood and Her Books for Children. London: Oxford University Press. ISBN 0-19-278010-7.
- Dawson, Janis (2019). "Mary Martha Sherwood". Dictionary of Literary Biography. Vol. 163. Detroit, Michigan: Gale. pp. 267–281. ISBN 978-0787696603.
- Demers, Patricia (1991). "Mrs. Sherwood and Hesba Stretton: The Letter and Spirit of Evangelical Writing for Children". In McGavran, Jr., James Holt (ed.). Romanticism and Children's Literature in Nineteenth-century England. Athens, Georgia: University of Georgia Press. pp. 129–149. ISBN 0-8203-1289-4.
- Hanson, David C. (1989). "Ruskin's Praeterita and Landscape in Evangelical Children's Education". Nineteenth-Century Literature. 44 (1): 45–66. doi:10.2307/3045106. JSTOR 3045106.
- Harper, Emily (2004). "'The Tormented Shadow of the Fairchild Children': What Can The History of the Fairchild Family Tell Us About Child-Rearing in the Early Nineteenth Century?". History of Education Researcher. 73: 1–10.
- Peterson, Linda H. (2009). Becoming a Woman of Letters: Myths of Authorship and Facts of the Victorian Market. Princeton, New Jersey: Princeton University Press. ISBN 9781400833252.
- Rosman, Doreen (1984). Evangelicals and Culture. London: Croom Helm. ISBN 0-7099-2253-1.
- Smith, Naomi Royde (1946). The State of Mind of Mrs. Sherwood. London: Macmillan and Co. Ltd.
- Sherwood, Mary Martha (1910). Darton, F. J. Harvey (ed.). The Life and Times of Mrs. Sherwood from the Diaries of Captain and Mrs. Sherwood. London: Wells Gardner, Darton & Co., Ltd.
- Vallone, Lynne (1991). "'A Humble Spirit under Correction': Tracts, Hymns, and the Ideology of Evangelical Fiction for Children, 1780–1820". The Lion and the Unicorn. 15 (2): 72–95. doi:10.1353/uni.0.0155. S2CID 143540425.
