= Reading Girls' School =

Location
- Northumberland Avenue; Reading, Berkshire, RG2 7PY; England; 51.43626°N 0.960875°W

Information
- Type: Academy; Bilateral school
- Established: 1818; 208 years ago (as Reading Girls' British School)
- Local authority: Reading Borough Council
- Trust: Baylis Court Trust
- Department for Education URN: 144610 Tables
- Ofsted: Reports
- Principal: Marika Farrugia
- Gender: Girls
- Age: 11 to 16
- Enrolment: 474
- Colour: Navy Blue
- Website: http://www.readinggirlsschool.co.uk

Reading Girls' School is a single-sex partially selective (bilateral) school in Reading, Berkshire, England.

== History ==
RGS traces its history to Reading Girls' British School, established in 1818 at Southampton Street. Neither is to be confused with Reading Abbey Girls' School, attended by Jane Austen. In 1907 it transferred to the new purpose-built George Palmer School in Basingstoke Road. In 1960 George Palmer Girls' School moved to RGS' current campus at Northumberland Avenue and was named Southlands Secondary School for Girls. The boys' section had moved to the purpose-built Ashmead School in 1952. That school was later renamed Thamesbridge College before becoming John Madejski Academy in 2010 then being renamed once more to Hartland High School taking effect in September 2025. Southlands School was renamed Reading Girls' School in 1993 with the reimplementation of its selective stream.

Since November 2015 RGS is undergoing a rebuild, a new campus on the same site is due to be completed by August 2016.

In February 2016 RGS was placed into special measures after an Ofsted inspection rated the school as 'inadequate'. The inspection highlighted problems with leadership, management and quality of teaching at the school.

Previously a foundation school administered by Reading Borough Council, in September 2017 Reading Girls' School converted to academy status and is now sponsored by the Baylis Court Trust.

== Academics ==
Although Reading Girls' School is not categorised as a grammar school, it does have verbal and non-verbal reasoning entrance tests for the selective stream section of the school.

The school offers GCSEs and BTECs as programmes of study for pupils.
