= Patricia Demers =

Canadian humanist and academic

Dr. Patricia A. Demers, CM FRSC is a Canadian humanist and academic. She was the first female president of the Royal Society of Canada serving from 2005 to 2007.

== Early life and education ==
Demers grew up in Hamilton, Ontario, and received a Bachelor of Arts degree in English and French and a Master of Arts degree from McMaster University. She received a Ph.D. from the University of Ottawa.

== Career ==
After receiving her Ph.D., she taught for three years as a sessional instructor at the University of Alberta. She then became an assistant professor and is now a professor of English and Film Studies. Her research includes Elizabethan and Jacobean drama, 17th-century poetry, children's literature, and contemporary Canadian women's writing.

From 1991 to 1993, she was Associate Dean of Graduate Studies, and from 1995 to 1998 she was Department Chair. From 1998 to 2002, she was Vice-President of the Social Sciences and Humanities Research Council of Canada. She was made a Fellow of Royal Society of Canada in 2000 and served as its first female president from 2005 to 2007.

== Selected publications ==
She is the author and editor of a number of scholarly publications including:

- A Garland from the Golden Age: An Anthology of Children's Literature from 1850 to 1900 (Oxford University Press, 1983)
- Women as Interpreters of the Bible (Paulist Press, 1992), Heaven Upon Earth: The Form of Moral and Religious Children's Literature to 1850 (University of Tennessee, 1993)
- The World of Hannah More (University Press of Kentucky, 1996)
- Women's Writing in English: Early Modern England (University of Toronto Press, 2005)
- Travels and Tales of Miriam Green Ellis : Pioneer Journalist of the Canadian West. (Edmonton: University of Alberta Press, 2013.)
- Women’s Writing in Canada (University of Toronto Press, 2019)

== Awards and recognition ==
She was awarded the University of Alberta Rutherford Award for Excellence in Undergraduate Teaching, the Arts Faculty Teaching Award, the McCalla Research Professorship Award, and the University Cup. On June 30, 2016, Demers was made a Member of the Order of Canada by Governor General David Johnston for "her insightful contributions to the study of early works of English literature and for her service to the academic community."

Professional and academic associations
Preceded by Gilles Paquet	President of the Royal Society of Canada; 2005–2007	Succeeded by Yvan Guindon
