= William Talbot (1717–1774) =

William Talbot (18 May 1717 – 2 March 1774), often called "Talbot of Kineton" after his first living Kineton in Warwickshire, was an evangelical clergyman of the Church of England.

== Early life ==
The son of Sherington Talbot of the 38th Foot and his wife Elizabeth Medget(t), and grandson of William Talbot the Bishop of Durham, he was the elder brother of Sir Charles Henry Talbot, 1st Baronet. He matriculated at Exeter College, Oxford in 1737, graduating B.A. and M.A. in 1744.

== Talbot of Kineton ==
Talbot was ordained priest by Thomas Secker, then Bishop of Oxford, at the end of 1745. A friend of Sanderson Miller, Talbot is thought by Hawkes to have owed him his appointment to the Kineton living. Miller made changes to Kineton Church, for Talbot, in a Gothic Revival style, in 1755–6.

In 1757 Talbot was one of group of evangelical preachers invited during the summer season to Cheltenham, by William Legge, 2nd Earl of Dartmouth. At this period he was also under the influence of Lady Huntingdon, and spent time as a peripatetic "field preacher", to be found with Martin Madan in Northamptonshire as reported by James Hervey. His friend Thomas Haweis, then recently ordained, gave his view of Talbot's conversion of the late 1750s to evangelical views in writing to Samuel Walker of Truro in 1759:

"His living is nothing in value, but most laborious in service. He took it merely with a view to do good, having that desire in great simplicity, before he could be at all said to be evangelical, which he has been about a twelvemonth or more. He had always a doctrinal knowledge of the scheme, but till then, no inward experimental acquaintance with it."

Talbot supported Miller when in the throes of mental illness in the 1750s. It was Talbot who arranged for Miller's care during his breakdown of 1759, first with Robert James. Miller was then taken to an asylum in Hoxton, thought to be a referral from James to Isaac Schomberg. Talbot's actions were resented by Miller, and their friendship ended.

In 1762, Talbot stepped into a dispute between Haweis and John Hume, Bishop of Oxford. The intervention was unavailing, as was an appeal to Thomas Secker, by then the Archbishop of Canterbury, by Haweis; and he had to leave Oxford where his Methodism was unacceptable for London. As a tactic, Talbot and his ally Joseph Jane were probing the powers of the bishops to restrict curacies: Haweis had held one at St Mary Magdalen's Church, Oxford, and Talbot offered himself in his place.

== Later life ==
Talbot was presented to St Giles' Church, Reading, around 1768, where he succeeded James Yorke; this was an exchange of livings, and it took place after Secker had presented Talbot to the London church All Hallows, Thames Street. Yorke was the same time Dean of Lincoln. The Secker and Talbot families were close.

In Reading, Talbot continued with a pastorate of the same kind as in Kineton. Sir Richard Hill, 2nd Baronet, a friend from this time, found his views those of a "moderate Calvinist". Talbot died on 2 March 1774, at the house of his friend William Wilberforce, uncle of the abolitionist Member of Parliament; his death was attributed to a fever caught on a pastoral visitation.

== Evangelical legacy ==
Talbot's successor at St Giles was William Bromley Cadogan. Opposed to the views of John Wesley, and regarded by Richard Cecil as a Calvinist of High Church views on polity, Cadogan was subsequently much influenced by Talbot's widow Sarah in the direction of a similar evangelical approach as parish priest. It was after a difficult start, in which Talbot's curate John Hallward was dismissed by Cadogan; he was found a living at Shawbury by Sir Richard Hill.

Charles Parsons, who had worked as a servant for both Talbot and Wilberforce, became the first nonconformist minister in Kineton.

== The Jonathan Britain case ==
As a prison visitor in Reading, Talbot became involved in the case of the forger Jonathan Britain, executed in 1772. In 1771 one of Britain's victims asked Talbot to visit Britain, held then in a compter called Abbey Gateway, attached to St Laurence's Church, Reading, and so in a different parish. Setting aside protocol, Talbot saw Britain, an unrepentant fantasist. His involvement continued to the point of Britain being brought to trial in a different city.

Talbot wrote a book defending his conduct in the matter, which had aroused public comment. Britain had been employed in Bristol as an usher in the mathematical school run by Benjamin Donne. Talbot's actions in following up forgeries in Reading to a prosecution in Bristol have been presented as vindictive. Britain, who had become a soldier, had attracted attention by relating treasonous activities, including a plot to assassinate the king.

== Family ==
Talbot married Sarah Eyles, daughter of John Eyles. His support for the antiquarian and biographer George Ballard brought a dedication of Ballard's work Memoirs of British Ladies to Sarah; she and Ballard corresponded. Sarah outlived her husband, on good terms with William Romaine and John Newton, and visited by Henry Venn and Rowland Hill. She died in 1785.

== In literature ==
Talbot is mentioned in Richard Jago's long poem of 1767 on Edge Hill, Warwickshire, not far from Kineton to the south.
