= Royal Navy during the Napoleonic Wars =

Royal Navy during the Napoleonic wars
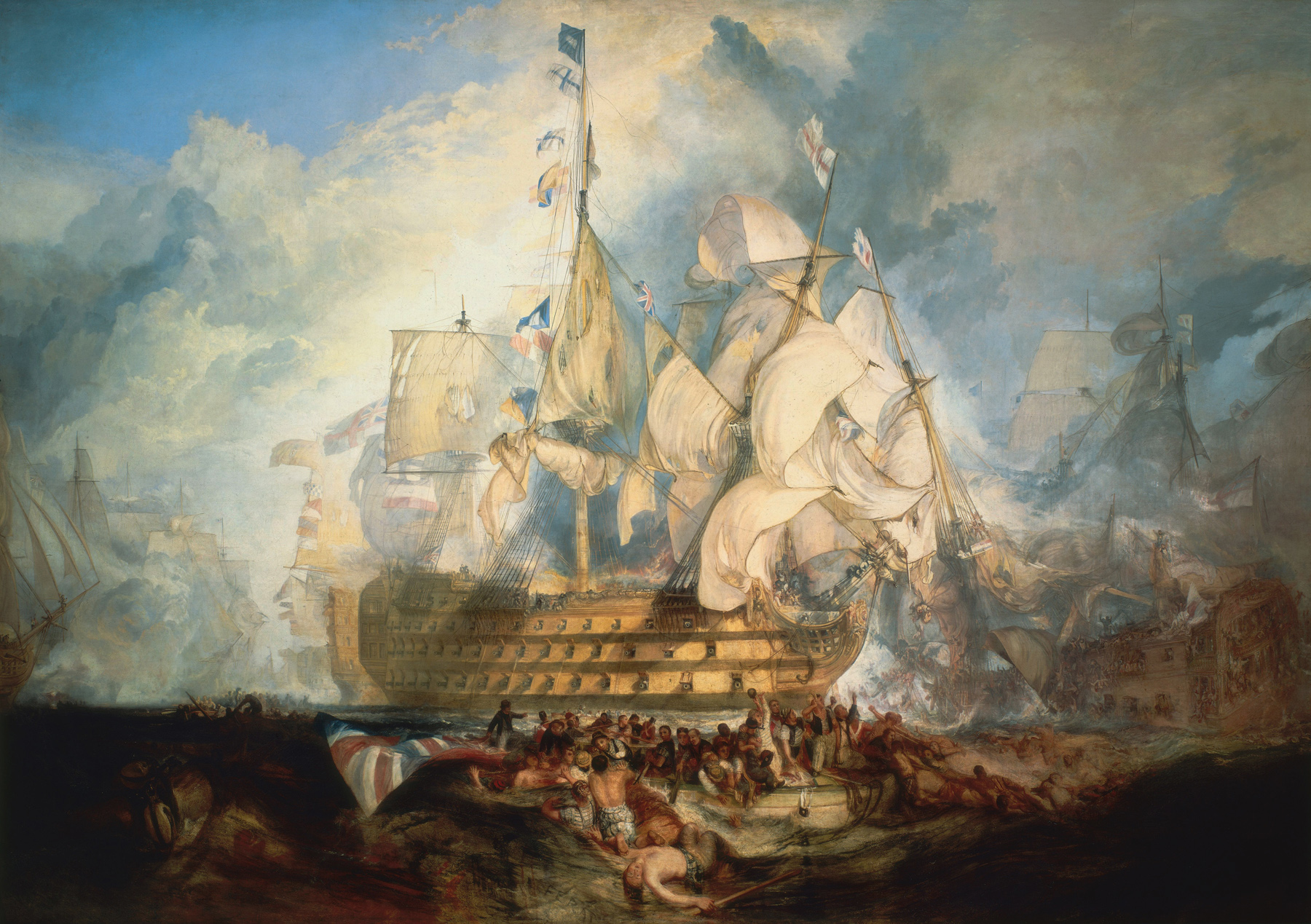
- The Battle of Trafalgar, on 21 October 1805 by William Turner 1822

- Naval ensign
- Service branches: Royal Marines
- Headquarters: Admiralty, London

Leadership
- First Lord of the Admiralty: John Pitt; John Jervis; Henry Dundas; Charles Middleton et al.

Personnel
- Active personnel: 138,000 1813

Expenditure
- Budget: 21,212,012 1813
- Percent of GDP: 6.4

The Royal Navy during the Napoleonic Wars was a dominant force at sea, tasked with maintaining blockade operations, supporting military campaigns, and defending British interests worldwide. It operated under the central authority of the Admiralty, which controlled recruitment, logistics, and strategy from Whitehall. The Navy's organizational structure relied heavily on a hierarchy of commissioned officers, warrant officers, and enlisted men. Promotion above deck was often influenced by a mix of patronage, experience, and battlefield merit, while the lower decks were filled with men drawn from varied backgrounds.

Seamen lived and worked in challenging conditions, with crowded quarters, strict discipline, and repetitive daily routines. Rations were plain and often of poor quality, but efforts to improve health included the regular use of lemon juice to combat scurvy and, later, the introduction of tinned foods. Medical care on board was basic, usually limited to a ship's surgeon and assistants, yet systematic efforts to manage disease slowly improved survival rates during the period. Recruiting enough experienced sailors was an ongoing problem for the Royal Navy. Heavy losses from battle, sickness, and desertion meant that ships were often undermanned. To fill crews, captains relied on a mix of volunteers attracted by bounties, conscription through press gangs, and quotas imposed on coastal counties.

The use of impressment created tension and was often unpopular both with seamen and among the general public. Many men taken into service were untrained landsmen, and integrating them with seasoned seafarers was a persistent challenge. Operationally, the Navy faced the immense task of blockading French ports, disrupting enemy trade, and supporting allies along extensive coastlines. British warships patrolled the Atlantic, the Mediterranean, and far beyond, often for years at a time without returning home.

The Navy encountered problems from within as well. Mutinies, most notably at Spithead and the Nore in the 1790s, exposed frustrations over pay, conditions, and discipline. Morale was tested by long deployments, risk of injury in battle, and harsh punishments for infractions. Despite these difficulties, the Royal Navy achieved major victories, most famously at the Battle of Trafalgar in 1805 under Admiral Nelson. Superior seamanship, organization, and the ability to maintain effective blockades played a major part in wearing down the French and allied navies. By holding command of the sea, the Navy prevented Napoleon from invading Britain and allowed British trade to continue throughout the wars.

== Background ==
When Prussia and Austria went to war against France in April 1792, the British did not initially join them. It was not until the French invasion of the Austrian Netherlands and France’s declaration of war in February 1793 that the British decided to side with the coalition. British strategy sought to reconcile the conflicting demands for a constant military presence with the overarching strategy of naval supremacy. However, the effective deployment of naval forces was hampered by the sheer size of the French pre-war fleet. The foundation for naval supremacy lay in a blockade of the French navy at its naval bases. The blockade would prevent the French from effectively protecting their colonies and merchant fleet, thereby weakening their economy.

== History ==
=== War of the First Coalition ===
When the French fleet was mobilized in 1793, there were few officers, the ships were dilapidated, the shipyards were empty, and the men were on the verge of mutiny. The struggle between local political interests and the centralizing Jacobins led to the surrender of Toulon—and with it, the French Mediterranean fleet—to the British. In 1793, the French initially remained inactive, giving the British ample time to assemble the Grand Fleet under Richard Howe at Spithead.

==== Glorious First of June ====
The first major engagement between the French and the Royal Navy took place on 1 June 1794, several hundred nautical miles west of Ushant. There, 25 British ships under Richard Howe encountered 26 French ships under Louis de Joyeuse. The French fleet was escorting a convoy of grain ships from the United States, while the British sought to disrupt French naval operations and prevent the delivery of supplies. The battle began with a series of intense ship-to-ship engagements, in which the British attempted to break through the French line to attack them from both sides. Although few ships were able to do so, the British managed to isolate individual French ships in a melee and cause heavy damage. The battle raged throughout the day, with several individual ship-to-ship encounters. Eventually, the French fleet was overwhelmed, and many of its ships were captured or forced to surrender. The British achieved a decisive victory by capturing seven French ships of the line and one frigate, inflicting significant losses on the enemy.

==== Mediterranean and North Sea ====
On 5 February 1794, a British fleet under John Jervis landed 6,100 men under Charles Grey on Martinique, which was captured on 15 March. On 2 April St. Lucia fell to the British, and ten days later, Guadeloupe did as well. In June and July 1795, further engagements took place in the Bay of Biscay and the Mediterranean, which the British were able to win. British losses amounted to 42 killed and 152 wounded. Finally, Corsica was captured in August. With the Netherlands and Spain joining France in 1795 and 1796, respectively, the strategic situation for the Royal Navy became even more difficult. In the Mediterranean, the Royal Navy was overwhelmed. In addition to maintaining the blockade of Toulon, it had to protect British trade, defend Corsica and Livorno, and support the Austrians in Italy and the Adriatic. After the French had captured Livorno, Corsica, and Elba, only a few ports remained open to the British, forcing the Royal Navy to withdraw from the Mediterranean to Gibraltar in December. Despite this setback, the Royal Navy managed to defeat the Spanish at St. Vincent and the Dutch at Camperduin. Although these victories provided a tremendous morale boost for the Royal Navy, they could only prevent the situation from deteriorating further until the end of the war in October.

=== War of the Second Coalition ===
By the time the Second Coalition was formed, France and Britain were already at war. After presenting a number of different reasons, Napoleon was able to convince the Directory to launch an invasion of Egypt in order to threaten British trade routes to and from India and thereby weaken the British economy. The British soon learned of a large fleet in Toulon, but since the Royal Navy was still barred from the Mediterranean, gathering further information about its destination and size proved very difficult. Vice Admiral John Jervis was tasked by the Admiralty with assessing the situation. Jervis, in turn, dispatched Horatio Nelson to the Mediterranean in early May 1798. There, he finally learned of the French fleet’s departure for Egypt.

==== Battle of the Nile ====
On 1 August, Admiral Nelson's fleet reached the Egyptian coast. There, he could only conclude that the French had already gone ashore. The British searched the coast for the French fleet and finally spotted it anchoring in Aboukir Bay. Although only a few hours remained before nightfall and the French ships were anchored in a strong defensive position, Nelson gave the order to attack immediately. Several British warships were able to slip through a gap at the head of the French battle line and get behind their positions allowing the British to double the French fleet. Fierce fighting ensued, with both sides receiving heavy damage. The climax was reached around 10:00 p.m., when the 120-gun ship L'Orient, along with most of its crew, was blown up. The fighting continued for the rest of the night. Of the 15 French ships, only two ships of the line and two frigates escaped destruction or capture by the British.

==== Europe ====
Following France's declaration of war on Austria and Russia in March 1799, Great Britain sought a way to make an effective contribution. In London, the British government recognized that public opinion in the Netherlands had turned against France. Consequently, in early summer, the government prepared an expedition under the supreme command of the Duke of York to restore the former stadtholder, William V of Orange, to power. Troops numbering approximately 27,000 men were assembled for the expedition. Russia provided an additional 17,593 men, as well as transport ships and an escort. The entire fleet was placed under the command of Vice Admiral Andrew Mitchell.

On 15 August Lord Duncan assumed command. Due to bad weather, the expedition did not reach the vicinity of Texel until the evening of 21 August, when it anchored off Kuikduin. The next morning, the ships set sail again and anchored once more half a nautical mile from the shore. A message was sent to Vice Admiral Samuel Storij under the flag of truce. Storij refused to surrender his ships and declared that he would defend them in the event of an attack. Under fire from the squadron, a landing was therefore carried out on August 27 on the mainland near Den Helder, which was captured shortly thereafter. At the same time, the Dutch ships anchored in Nieuwe Diep were captured without resistance.

Early in the morning of 30 August, Mitchell’s squadron anchored off the entrance to the Vlieter, where the ships under Storij’s command were moored. Even as he was making his way there, Mitchell sent another ship to demand that Storij surrender. Two Dutch captains met under the flag of truce, and it was agreed that Storij would be given an hour to consider. After less than an hour, the Dutch announced that it had been decided to surrender the ships of his squadron.

After Russia left the coalition in October, the Royal Navy found itself facing an alliance between Russia, Denmark, and Sweden. One of their first actions was to seize British merchant ships in Russian ports. Once again, Great Britain stood alone against France. A large fleet under Hyde Parker was dispatched to the Baltic Sea to resolve the issue. On 2 April, the British under Nelson attacked Copenhagen’s floating defences. After several hours of fighting, the Danes finally surrendered and were forced to abandon their policy of armed neutrality. On 6 July a fleet under James Saumarez was defeated by the French in the Bay of Gibraltar. Nine days later, Saumarez encountered the French again but was able to defeat them this time. The War of the Second Coalition ended with the signing of the Treaty of Amiens by Charles Cornwallis on 25 March 1802.

=== War of the Third Coalition ===
When Great Britain declared war on France on 18 May 1803, there were two key points where it was both possible and necessary to block Napoleon’s expansionist ambitions: the English Channel and the central chokepoints in the Mediterranean. To prevent France’s advance into the Levant, the Royal Navy had to hold Malta and station a fleet in the western Mediterranean. However, since Malta was too far from Toulon to serve as a base for a blockade, the British had to turn their attention to both Sicily and North Africa. While Horatio Nelson kept the French at bay in the Mediterranean, the British launched a series of military operations in the West Indies. St. Lucia was captured on 22 June 1803, and Tobago nine days later. Demerara, Essequibo, and Berbice followed in September and November. At the same time, Saint-Domingue was blockaded, which ultimately led to the defeat of the French garrison and the independence of Haiti. In 1804, Suriname was finally conquered.

In Europe, Napoleon had begun building an invasion fleet. Given this threat, it was crucial to maintain the blockade of Brest. Furthermore, it was virtually impossible to cross the Channel without encountering ships from the English Channel Fleet. In December 1804, Spain’s entry into the war on the French side dramatically worsened the strategic situation for the Royal Navy. The 83 operational British ships were now facing 102 ships of the Franco-Spanish fleet. On 22 July an attempt to land in Great Britain was repelled in the Battle of Cape Finisterre. However, the Franco-Spanish fleet had not been defeated, and so another battle took place on 21 October 1805.

==== Trafalgar ====
When the British were sighted on the morning of 21 October, the French admiral Villeneuve ordered his fleet to form a line of battle. Nelson ordered his fleet to form two columns and attack from the west at a right angle. By noon, the leeward column under Admiral Cuthbert Collingwood had attacked the rear of the Franco-Spanish line, while Nelson attacked the vanguard and centre of Villeneuve’s line. Most of Nelson’s column managed to break through the enemy fleet’s line and either capture or destroy it in a melee. During the engagement, Nelson was struck by a musket ball aboard the Victory and seriously wounded. He was taken below deck, where he later succumbed to his injuries. An attempted counterattack by Admiral Pierre Dumanoir was repelled. Collingwood completed the destruction of the rearguard, and the battle ended around 5:00 p.m. With the subsequent Battle of Cariño, the threat of invasion came to an end.

=== War of the Fourth and Fifth Coalition ===
Although the War of the Third Coalition ended with the Treaty of Pressburg, Great Britain continued the fight against Napoleon until the start of the War of the Fourth Coalition. In February 1806, a French squadron was defeated at the Battle of San Domingo. The rest of the year saw further engagements: off the coast of North Africa, in the Caribbean, in the Indian Ocean, and in the South Pacific.

The war between France and Great Britain continued after the Peace of Tilsit in 1807. Skirmishes took place off Cadiz in April 1808 and in the Bay of Biscay in November of the same year. In April 1809, the Battle of the Bay of Biscay finally took place. After the war on the continent ended, Napoleon turned his attention to Great Britain and its navy. He immediately took steps to secure the still-powerful Danish and Portuguese fleets. The British, however, preempted him by sending a powerful naval squadron to Copenhagen, which bombarded the city and seized the Danish fleet in September. Two months later, another squadron was dispatched to Portugal to persuade the Portuguese royal family and the fleet to flee to Brazil under British protection rather than submit to France. The Royal Navy’s determination and swift response surprised Napoleon and thwarted his plan to wrest the maritime initiative from Great Britain. By the end of the year, further operations followed off Java and in the Caribbean, resulting in the conquest of the Danish West Indies.

==== War of the Sixth Coalition and Hundred Days ====
During the War of the Sixth Coalition, the Royal Navy was engaged only in minor operations. It remained focused on its primary mission of blockading French ports and protecting its trade routes. The first Treaty of Paris, whose terms were generally confirmed following Napoleon’s return in 1815, granted Britain numerous overseas naval bases. It retained Malta and Heligoland. It kept Cape of Good Hope, Mauritius, and Sri Lanka, and expanded its Caribbean colonies to include Tobago and St. Lucia. The war ended for the Royal Navy with the mission to escort Napoleon to St. Helena.

== Leadership control and organisation ==
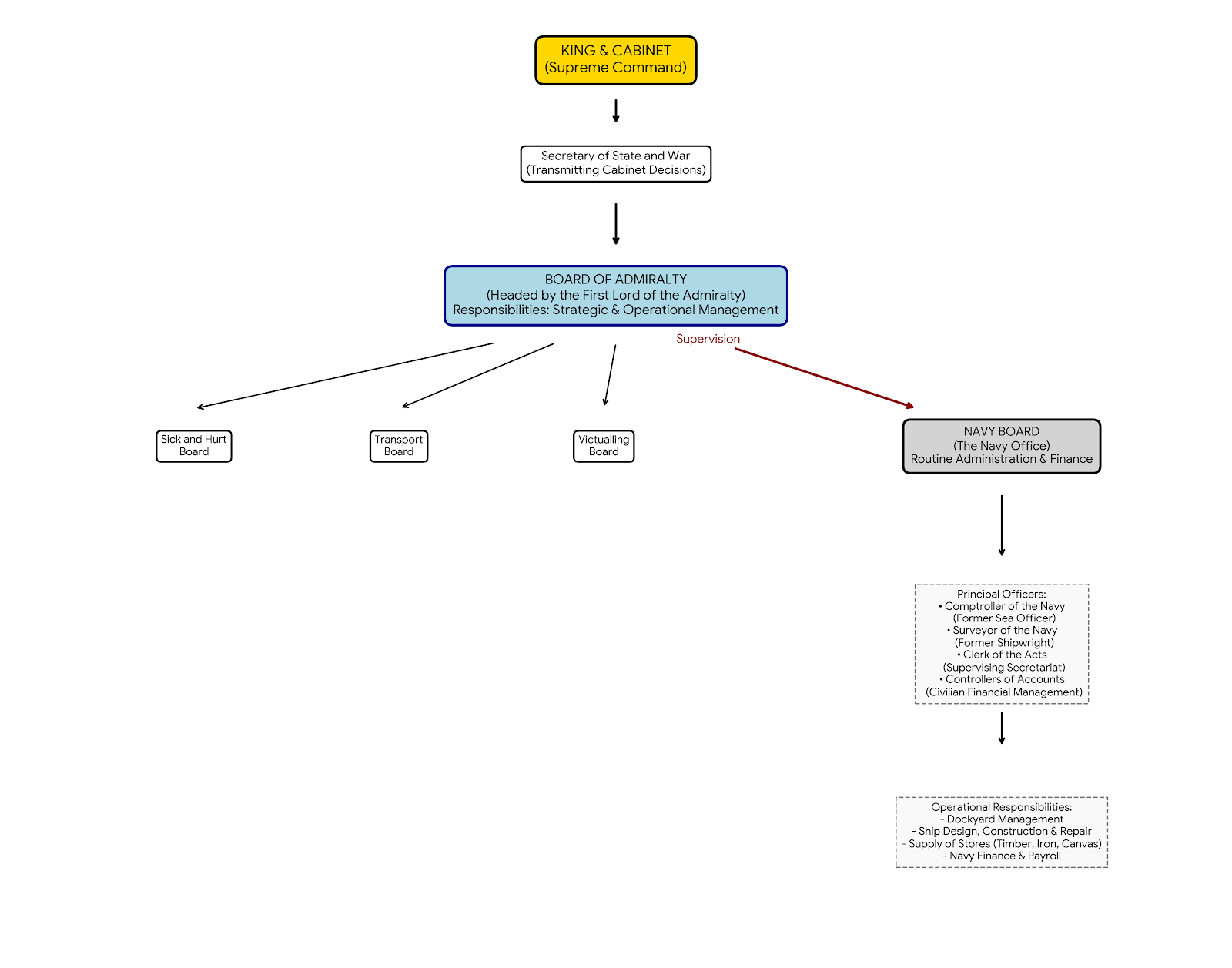
Royal Navy Administration diagram

The supreme command of the Navy lay in the hands of the King, who send his commands, de facto the Cabinet's decisions, via the Secretary of State and war to the Admiralty. The two main bodies who jointly administered the Navy were the Admiralty and the Navy Office. The Admiralty who included the sick and hurt, the transport and victualling board, were controlled by the Board of Admiralty headed by the First Lord of the Admiralty. The responsibilities of the Admiralty were the strategic and operational management of the Navy. Although the Admiralty Board included one to three junior sea officers, there was no position equivalent to the modern First Sea Lord, who acts as the professional head of the Navy.

The Navy office was responsible for the day-to-day routine administration of the navy including management of the dockyards, the design, construction and repair of ships as well as the supply of naval stores like timber, iron or canvas. The Navy office was also responsible for the finance of the Navy and the payment of the officers and men. The office was supervised by the Navy Board with their principal officers Comptroller of the Navy (always a former sea officer), the Surveyor of the Navy (always a former shipwright) the Clerk of the acts (usually a former Navy Office clerk, supervising the large secretariat) and the civilian Controllers of Accounts managing the financial business of the Board.

== Units ==
During the Napoleonic wars, there were eight fleets and stations distributed around the world. The main fleets' respective stations were the Mediterranean, the English Channel and the North Sea. Minor stations were at Jamaica, the East Indies, the Leeward Islands and North America/West Indies. There was no strict difference in size between fleets and squadrons; sometimes a squadron could be as large or larger than a fleet. For example, the Mediterranean fleet, considered one of the most important commands, had up to sixty-two ships in 1797, while the Leeward Islands squadron, commanding a less vital region, had forty-four ships in the same year. Generally, the largest fleets ranged from thirty to over ninety ships, while squadrons could vary from a few ships to more than forty. A fleet was typically commanded by an Admiral of the fleet, a Vice-admiral, or a Rear-Admiral. A squadron was also commanded by a flag officer or a Commodore. (Note: Such squadrons were only up to 10 ships) In some cases, ships and squadrons operated directly under Admiralty orders without an admiral, with a captain in command.

== Recruitment and training ==
=== Rank and file ===
During the Napoleonic Wars, the Royal Navy faced a constant shortage of trained seamen. Demand for manpower rose sharply as Britain expanded its fleet, from 283 ships in 1795 up to 335 in 1810. The manpower increased from 96,000 to 138,000 including officers and marines. Captains carried responsibility for recruiting their own crews. They preferred skilled volunteers, often former merchant seamen or men transferring from other ships. Volunteers received a bounty based on experience and two months' pay up front, which allowed them to buy clothing and equipment from the ship's purser. Motivations for volunteering included the chance to avoid forced recruitment and the stigma of being pressed.

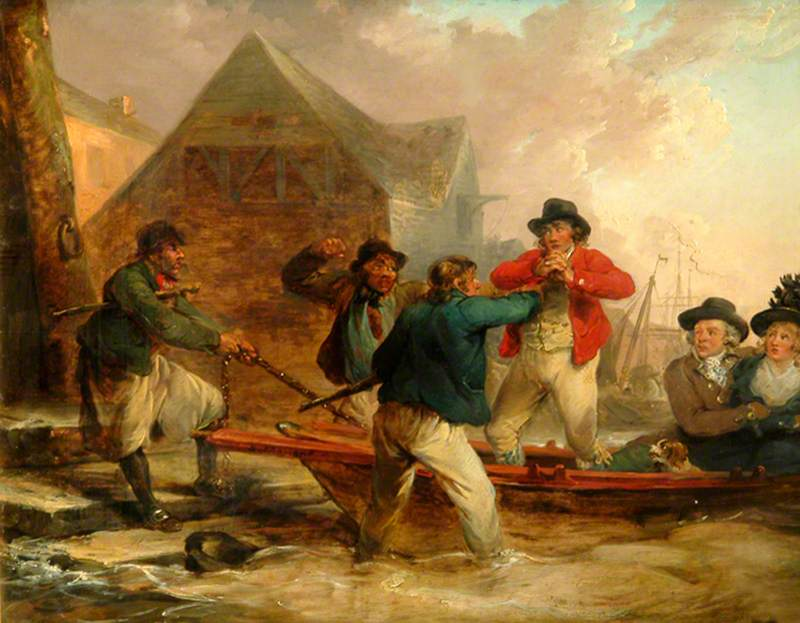
George Morland The Press-Gang oil on panel 1790

Press gangs formed part of the recruitment system, especially during wartime. A captain would send sailors and an officer ashore with a press warrant to impress men into service. Press gangs based their operations from an inn, searching the streets and taverns for likely recruits. They often checked for physical signs of seafaring, such as tar-stained hands. While some men joined as 'volunteers' for the bounty, many resisted, leading to violent struggles and frequent attempts by friends or relatives to prevent their capture. Sometimes press gangs exceeded their authority and took foreigners or men with official protection papers.

Pressed men were taken to a rendezvous point and then transferred to a pressing tender — an anchored vessel acting as a temporary prison. Conditions on these ships were harsh, with crowded and unsanitary holds and armed guards to prevent escape. Time spent waiting for transfer to a warship could range from a single night to several weeks. The Impress Service operated in major ports, employing officers who managed permanent press gangs. Incentives included payment for every recruit and opportunities for bribes. Around 1,000 officers and men worked in 85 gangs across English coastal towns in 1795.

Impressment also occurred at sea, where Royal Navy captains could board merchant ships and seize crew, as long as enough men were left to bring the ship home. Some merchant ships built concealed spaces for hiding valuable crew during inspection. Exemptions from impressment applied to pilots, fishermen, apprentices, merchant officers, and foreigners, documented by easily forged or borrowed protection papers. Foreigners could only join as volunteers, but Americans and others were often taken regardless.

Quota Acts in 1795 and 1796 addressed shortages by requiring each county to supply a set number of men. Quotas were based on population and the number of ports. Incentives and high bounties encouraged poor men and petty criminals to volunteer. In some cases, prisoners could join the Navy as an alternative to serving sentences or to pay off debts. Even war prisoners, including foreign nationals, sometimes enlisted rather than face continued incarceration. The Quota Act system increased the intake of unskilled men, lowering the overall standards within the service. Despite being unpopular and at times chaotic, these combined methods of recruitment allowed the Royal Navy to find the numbers needed for its ships, though the experience and training levels of new recruits varied widely.

There was no formal training for seamen except for the gunnery, as most of them were largely trained in the merchant service. Gunnery drills took place every day under the guidance of the gunner and the gunner's mate. Instead of written instructions, crews used a routine sequence of commands and steps that could show minor differences from ship to ship. Each drill involved several phases. To begin, the gun was secured using the train-tackle. The barrel was then swabbed clean. A cartridge, typically stored in a paper container, was handed to the crew from behind the gun and rammed down the barrel. After this, the shot was collected from a nearby rack or brought from behind and also rammed home.

A wad made from rags was added to keep the shot in place. The gun was then pulled into firing position with the help of gun tackles. Crew members carefully arranged the ends of the gun-tackles to prevent tangling with the carriage when the gun recoiled. The gun captain placed a powder-filled quill into the touch-hole to pierce the cartridge, checked the alignment and aim, and fired the gun. The weapon would then recoil, after which it was again held by the train-tackle. The gun captain sealed the vent to reduce wear from the gases released. The crew would then repeat this cycle for each round.

A 32-pounder cannon, weighing about three tons, was positioned with around eleven feet of space from gun center to gun center. With each carriage and wheel assembly about five feet wide, the space between neighbouring guns was roughly six feet. Crew members from two adjacent guns carried out all necessary tasks in this confined area. Each sailor had only about two feet of width to manoeuvre. Within this narrow space, they hauled on ropes, passed ammunition, and avoided the recoil. This restriction meant that a small misstep either forward or back risked injury or colliding with someone from the neighbouring crew.

=== Royal Marines ===
The Royal Marines on land were organized into four divisions, usually called by the names of their barracks at Chatham, Portsmouth, Plymouth, and Woolwich. Recruitment and training followed a pattern similar to that of the army. Each division was directed by a major-general or a colonel. Divisions were split into companies, not regiments. A company, led by a captain, included four officers, sixteen non-commissioned officers, five drummers, and 130 marines. Warships with at least twelve guns carried marine detachments. These detachments did not follow the company structure; instead, officers and men were assigned as needed. Large ships employed up to thirty marines for guard duty. Marines on guard did not stand watch for the full four hours but were posted in shifts, typically relieved after two hours.

Marines assisted sailors with basic tasks on board such as manning pumps, working the capstan to haul in anchors, and moving ballast or casks in the hold. They were not sent aloft to work in the rigging, but still had to perform demanding manual jobs. When not on guard, marines participated in daily drills and musket practice and were also trained in gunnery. In 1804, the Royal Marine Artillery was established to take over from Royal Artillery detachments that had previously operated mortars on bomb vessels. Each marine division then included one artillery company, made up of nine officers and eighty-six men.

=== Officers ===
Commissioned officers and warrant officers were recruited and promoted through separate systems in the Royal Navy during the Napoleonic Wars. Commissioned officers received their appointments directly from the Admiralty, while warrant officers were appointed by the Navy Board, which operated as a subordinate authority. Commissioned officers, sometimes called sea officers, included ranks from lieutenant to admiral. These were the individuals who commanded ships, led squadrons, and supervised naval operations. They were generalists, responsible for executive duties and leadership. Except for the captain who had his own accommodations, commissioned officers ate together in the wardroom.

Warrant officers, in contrast, specialized in technical fields. Their ranks included the master, surgeon, purser, boatswain, gunner, and carpenter. While their leadership roles were generally limited to their own areas of expertise, a few, such as the master or purser, had enough status to join commissioned officers in the wardroom. Most warrant officers spent many years assigned to the same ship, and their advancement prospects were much more limited than those of commissioned officers.

The majority of commissioned officers came from families in the middle or upper middle class, rather than from the aristocracy. Many followed in the footsteps of fathers or relatives who had served in the Navy. Unlike the Army, where commissions could be purchased, becoming an officer required years of practical training at sea, followed by a rigorous examination before receiving a commission as a lieutenant. Even after passing the exam, an officer usually waited for a position to become available. Promotion depended on ability, social connections, and chance rather than on wealth. For example, at Trafalgar from the 172 lieutenants 80 per cent were from the middle class.

Royal Navy commissions were issued on the authority of three admirals rather than directly from the monarch, as in the Army. The commissioning document's language was more direct and less ceremonious than its Army equivalent, ending with a warning that disobedience would be at the officer's peril. There were several routes to obtaining a commission. The most common path began in boyhood with service as a captain's servant or in another informal position, followed by at least six years at sea, including two years as a midshipman or master's mate. After this, the candidate could take the oral examination required for the rank of lieutenant. Many who entered this path had family connections among the officers, which helped in securing a place aboard a ship.

It was also possible for an ordinary seaman or a boy to rise through merit, advancing through petty officer ratings before being appointed midshipman or master's mate. After two years in these posts, he could attempt to pass the lieutenant's exam. Those taking this route tended to be older when they finally joined the officer corps. Some officers transferred from the Merchant Service, especially if they attained the rank of mate or higher and sought opportunities in the Navy. These men could become master's mates and use their seafaring experience to further their naval careers.

Training at the Royal Naval College in Portsmouth provided another route. The college, offered boys between ages thirteen and sixteen three years of education in navigation, mathematics, and other subjects. Despite the academic training, this method was not widely favoured; practical experience at sea, personal connections, and reputation mattered more in achieving promotion. Volunteer Class 1 provided yet another entry by appointing boys, usually at least thirteen years old, as volunteers who would then serve as midshipmen or master's mates before taking the lieutenant's examination. While the sons of officers could join as young as eleven, others had to wait until thirteen. The system for choosing these volunteers usually rested on personal acquaintance or family connection with the ship's captain, rather than formal selection by the Admiralty.

== Pay ==
During most of the eighteenth century, Royal Navy pay remained on scales set in 1700, with only small changes. In 1794, when officers lost the right to have personal servants on board, their pay was increased by £11 8s per year for each servant they no longer had. In 1797, lieutenants' pay rose to a standard £7 per month in all types of ship. This year also brought increases for petty officers and ratings: petty officers and able seamen received 5s 6d more per month; ordinary seamen gained 4s 6d; landmen received an increase of 3s 6d. In 1807, a new and more comprehensive pay scale was introduced, increasing general pay and recognizing more petty officer roles. These changes especially affected captains of ship sections.

Officer pay was influenced by both rank and "post", meaning the position and the ship's rating. For example, a captain of a large ship earned much more than a captain of a small ship, and the difference between a captain and a lieutenant could be less than that between two captains of different ships. In 1793, there was a gap of about £20 monthly between captains of first-rate and sixth-rate ships, but only £1 8s between the lowest paid captain and the highest paid lieutenant. Flag officers followed this system even more strongly. In 1793, an Admiral and Commander-in-Chief earned £140 per lunar month, or £1,820 per year, while the lowest ranks such as boy-servants earned nothing. With all income sources considered, senior officers' incomes were far higher than those of junior crew.

Pay scale of Flag officers
pay per day	
Admiral of the Fleet	5£ 0s 0d
Admiral	3£ 10s 0d
Vice-Admiral	2£ 10s 0d
Rear-Admiral	1£ 15s 0d

Pay scale for officers, warrant officers and ratings in 1807
pay per month	1st rate	2nd rate	3rd rate	4th rate	5th rate	6th rate
Captain	32£ 4s 0d	26£ 12s 0d	23£ 12s 0d	18£ 4s 0d	15£ 8s 0d	16£ 16s 0d
Lieutenants	8£ 8s 0d (£9 2s 0d in flagships)					
Master	12£ 12s 0d	11£ 11s 0d	10£ 10s 0d	9£ 9s 0d	8£ 8s 0 d	7£ 7s 0d
Surgeon	15£ 8s 0d to 25£ 4s 0d according to seniority					
Carpenter	5£ 16s 0d	5£ 6s 0d	4£ 16s 0s	3£ 6s 0d	3£ 6s 0d	3£ 1s 0d
Boatswain	4£ 16s 0d	4£ 6s 0d	3£ 16s 0d	3£ 6s 0d	3£ 6s 0d	3£ 1s 0d
Gunner	4£ 16s 0d	4£ 6s 0d	3£ 16s 0d	3£ 6s 0d	3£ 6s 0d	3£ 1s 0d
Midshipmen	2£ 15s 6d	2£ 10s 6d	2£ 8s 0d	2£ 4s 3d	2£ 0s 6d	2£ 0s 6d
Armourer	2£ 15s 6d	2£ 10s 6d	2£ 8s 0d	2£ 4s 3d	2£ 0s 6d	2£ 0s 6d
Master at Arms	2£ 15s 6d	2£ 10s 6d	2£ 8s 0d	2£ 4s 3d	2£ 0s 6d	2£ 0s 6d
Quartermaster	2£ 5s 6d	2£ 5s 6d	2£ 2s 6d	2£ 0s 6d	1£ 18s 6d	1£ 18s 6d
Coxwain	2£ 2s 6d	2£ 0s 6d	1£ 18s 6d	1£ 16s 6d	1£ 16s 6d	1£ 16s 6d
Steward	1£ 15s 6d	1£ 15s 6d	1£ 15s 6d	1£ 13s 10d	1£ 10s 2d	1£ 9s 6d
Cook	1£ 15s 6d	1£ 15s 6d	1£ 15s 6d	1£ 15s 6d	1£ 15s 6d	1£ 14s 6d
Chaplain	0£ 19s 0d					
Able Seaman	1£ 13s 6d					
Ordinary Seaman	1£ 5s 6d					

Allowances were given mainly to senior officers and some senior warrant officers. Ordinary crew and lower ranks received little if any in this area. The main allowance was "compensation", replacing wages for servants from 1794 onward. Typically, officers entitled to servants before 1794 now received 19s per month (calculated as a calendar month, not the 28-day naval pay month). When this amount for seamen rose in 1797, officers' compensation did not increase. This meant that although an ordinary seaman could receive £12 7s a year, an officer's compensation per servant remained £11 8s. Captains' entitlement to compensation depended on the size of their crew. A captain of a sixth-rate ship with about 200 crew received compensation for eight servants, totalling £91 4s a year.

A first-rate ship's captain could claim compensation for thirty-two servants, adding £364 16s per year to his income. Despite looking generous on paper, most of this money replaced prior entitlements to servants' wages. Admirals did not have servants based on crew size, but usually had several categories of dependents, including real servants, protégés, and a personal retinue. Some of these dependents received pay equal to able seamen. The Admiral and Commander-in-Chief could add "compensation" and "table money" (£1 per day) to his basic pay, bringing total annual earnings close to £2,857. Rear-admirals and other flag officers received less, with their extra income also tied to allowances and compensation.

Deductions were common. All naval personnel paid sixpence per month for the Royal Hospital at Greenwich. Warrant officers paid an extra shilling monthly for the Greenwich Chest, benefitting sick and injured seamen. Officers also contributed threepence per pound annually to the Officers' Widows' Fund. Half-pay was paid to some officers during peacetime or between appointments. It was based on seniority, not on ship rating. The first 100 post-captains or 300 lieutenants on the list received higher half-pay than more junior officers. However, warrant officers did not receive half-pay, but had access to pensions. After 1814, half-pay increased but still left junior officers with limited means.

=== Prize money ===
By the early eighteenth century, the laws around naval prize-money were largely in place. The Crown and the Lord High Admiral originally took shares of all prizes, but by 1708, most of the prize value went to the capturing crews. The 1708 Cruizers Act confirmed this, making almost all prize-money available for the captors, aside from a small part that still went to the Admiralty. Prize captures required confirmation through courts before rewards were distributed. The process started with a proclamation of hostilities, and every captured ship needed legal “condemnation” by the High Court of Admiralty. The law set strict rules to prevent unauthorized removal of cargo before this step.

Distribution of prize-money followed regulated shares. Before June 1808, three-eighths went to the captain, with flag officers taking a portion of this if they commanded a squadron. Captains of marines, lieutenants, the master, and other senior officers shared one-eighth. Other officers, warrant officers, midshipmen, and marine sergeants shared separate eighths. The remainder—two-eighths—went to the rest of the ship’s crew. In 1808, new rules combined the shares for junior officers and crew, raising their combined share to half the prize, while reducing the captain’s portion.

Flag officers received shares from all prize-money taken by ships under their command. The actual arrangement could make an admiral very wealthy, even with little involvement in each capture. Some admirals reportedly gained over £200,000 during their service. Captains were less certain of such fortunes, needing both opportunity and luck. Some gained sums as high as £65,000 from a single successful action, but others might see little or nothing. Lower ranks benefitted much less. Lieutenants, warrant officers, and midshipmen sometimes earned large sums in major prize hauls. However, most ordinary seamen saw modest amounts. Typical shares for a seaman on a valuable prize could equal several years’ wages, but such cases were rare. More often, payments were much smaller and subject to deduction by court and administrative fees.

Prize Courts, which handled legal claims and distributions, often charged high fees. These could consume a large portion of the prizes’ value, leading to complaints from officers and men. In some unusual cases, fees exceeded the value of the prize itself. Some officers, such as Lord Cochrane, documented abuses and inefficiencies in the Prize Court system. Disputes over shares were common, leading to lawsuits and grievances across ranks. The 1808 reforms reduced the differences between senior and junior personnel, enlarged the pool sharing the crew’s portion, and adjusted the officers’ fractions.

Prize-money offered ordinary seamen a rare financial windfall. Sometimes, lucky men used their share to buy out of the Navy or improve their lives. However, many spent their winnings quickly, a fact well noted by observers of the time. Privateers operated under separate rules, sailing with official permission to attack enemy commerce. Their fortunes varied. They could keep all proceeds from captured ships, as long as they followed legal requirements. Privateer activity remained common but was viewed with suspicion by the regular Navy. The opportunity for prize-money influenced morale and shaped life in the Royal Navy. While it provided the chance for unexpected fortune, for most it remained a lottery with uncertain results. The system rewarded risk but also brought delays, bureaucracy, and disputes that sometimes overshadowed its benefits.

== Promotion ==
Promotion in the Royal Navy during the late eighteenth and early nineteenth centuries involved a mix of personal merit, service experience, recommendations, and, above all, connections or patronage known as "Interest." Future officers usually entered the service under the patronage of established officers. The captain had the authority to rate a young entrant as a midshipman or master’s mate and could appoint him as an acting lieutenant within the ship. Full commissioning as a lieutenant required the captain to recommend the candidate, but final approval and the granting of a substantive commission rested with the admiral under whom the captain served. The admiral confirmed the captain’s appointment, recommended candidates to the Admiralty, and often attended to the advancement of officers collected into the flagship for promotion prospects. Despite influence at the local level, the Admiralty, specifically the First Lord, held ultimate authority, and all permanent promotions depended on his decision.

Vacancies for promotion were often dictated by events such as death or court martial. Commanders-in-chief of foreign stations could grant commissions to fill non-post commands, but those appointments needed later confirmation from the Admiralty. The structure of naval advancement was complicated by blockages in the career path. For most officers, the required steps were to serve as a midshipman, pass for lieutenant, gain a commission, and then hope for further promotion. The duration in each rank varied widely depending on both opportunity and patronage. Some fortunate individuals could be promoted swiftly, possibly moving from midshipman to lieutenant in six years, or even less if backed by influential sponsors. Others languished for long periods; for example, there were officers who spent over fifteen years as lieutenants before obtaining promotion.

The number of captains repeatedly outgrew the available ships for them to command. By 1810, less than half of those listed as captains actually had appointments. With the establishment of the commander rank in 1794, direct promotion from lieutenant to post captain was abolished, and passage through the rank of commander became common. However, employment as a commander was difficult, as there were too few appropriate vessels. Promotion to commander or captain could mean a period of unemployment, so some declined advancing in rank if it meant going onto half-pay without a ship. Advancement often came as a reward for actions in battle—“hero-promotions”—or service in key positions, such as being first lieutenant after a victory. These could involve promotion with or without subsequent appointment to a command.

However, being promoted without a new command was increasingly common as the war continued and vacancies could not match the pool of eligible officers. For junior officers, promotion provided the only possible distinction, as medals or decorations were rare or forbidden as part of the uniform. Gallantry in action was the primary exception for the usual promotion route, but by the end of the wars more promotions were being made without reference to battle merit. Policy changes and experimentations such as advocating for "promotion by seniority," or the creation of promotion "zones," were trialled but not successfully established in the period. Promotion through the highest ranks followed a strict order, with only one or at most two officers at a time attaining the position of Admiral of the Fleet. Advancement at this level depended heavily on survival in post as much as distinction or interest.

== Living conditions ==
During the Napoleonic Wars, living conditions in the Royal Navy varied according to rank and the size of the ship. Senior officers such as captains occupied their own cabins at the stern or bow, furnished with wooden cots suspended from beams and a degree of privacy. The captain’s quarters were the most spacious, with separate rooms for dining and reception. Officers came together in the ward-room for meals and recreation, while warrant officers and midshipmen shared smaller compartments.

Most of the crew, known as ratings, slept and ate on the gun decks. Their quarters were cramped, with the standard width for a hammock space set at about 14 inches per man. Petty officers and midshipmen had slightly more room, up to 28 and 20 inches respectively, typically located near the ship’s sides. Hammocks made of canvas with a thin mattress and blanket were issued, and each man received two, partly to encourage cleanliness. Hammocks were clearly allotted by number and could be rolled up and stored during the day, making space in the confined area. Sleeping places were assigned according to rank and duty. As most warships operated on a two-watch system, half the men were generally at work, so that off-duty men could sometimes use the space on either side for additional room.

Messing arrangements on board were rudimentary. Few seamen owned private sea chests; these were often shared within each mess. Men ate in small groups from a common pot, using makeshift tables set between the guns or, when possible, on deck. Wet weather frequently forced hatches to be battened down for days, worsening conditions below. Crew members had to use buckets as toilets, which could not be emptied until the weather improved. Seasickness increased in rough seas, compounding the discomfort. Ship interiors were often cold and damp or became hot and humid, with limited air circulation. Even with windsails and other ventilators, lower decks remained poorly aired, and a mix of smells including tar, sea water, animal and bilge water, sweat, and rotting wood filled the air.

=== Hygiene ===
Regular fumigation and the use of vinegar intended to reduce odours and maintain hygiene. Cleanliness was regarded as essential for health, so both ships and men’s clothes were washed regularly, though personal washing was infrequent due to limited fresh water and costly soap. Crew often used a mixture of urine and ash as a cleaning agent for clothes. Officers enjoyed more privacy for their needs, while the crew used exposed facilities known as the "head" at the bow. Soap was often scarce, much like other clean garments. Sailors would turn shirts and stockings inside out to prolong use, suggesting appearance mattered more than odor. Officers had servants attend to laundry, but seamen sometimes paid for their washing ashore.

Although demanded, washing of the men themselves was irregular as there were no purpose-built washing facilities aboard the ships. Soap at the time was coarse and sometimes retained unpleasant smells, though some efforts were made to scent laundry soap. Sea-water soap was much in demand, with patented innovations occasionally advertised to improve laundry at sea or in hard water. Bad weather made conditions even harder, as movement was limited, hatches were closed for days, buckets used for toilets filled quickly, and seasickness increased among the crew. With little scope for variation, the placement of hammocks was tightly organized, with each man required to care for his bedding under penalty of wage deduction for loss. Hammocks were shortened over time by the crew to increase comfort. The organization of sleeping, eating, and storing personal belongings was strictly regulated, with careful demarcation of every berth and storage area to maximize limited space.

The Royal Navy generally recognised a link between dirt and disease, although the details were misunderstood. For this reason, the Navy devoted considerable effort to keeping its ships clean. Usually the upper deck was scrubbed every morning and holystoned twice a week. The lower decks were cleaned and holystoned once a week. The brass- and paintworks were also cleaned. Soap was preferred but most often a mixture of ash, vinegar and water was used. Even if scrubbing removed the dirtiest spots, most captains rarely found their decks to be as clean as they desired.

=== Diet ===
==== Ratings ====
The daily diet of Royal Navy seamen during the Napoleonic Wars was built around practicality, preservation, and the realities of extended time away from port. The routine meal for an ordinary sailor was anchored by a pound of bread or hard biscuit each day. Bread, called 'soft bread' when baked as a loaf, was mainly supplied when ships were in port. Most bread consumed at sea was a tough, dry biscuit that could keep for months. This biscuit was made simply with flour, water, and salt. Because of its hardness, sailors often had to soak or crush it before eating, sometimes adding it to soups or gravies. Dampness was the biscuit’s enemy, as it made the taste unpleasant and attracted pests.

Bread made in England was regulated by law, classified by flour quality—fine white flour produced a loaf marked ‘W’, wholemeal-type was labelled ‘SW’, and the lowest quality was 'household' bread, labelled ‘H’. Economic pressures sometimes forced bakers or the Navy to stretch wheat with flour from barley, rye, or pea flour, but these blends often produced heavy, less palatable loaves. The Victualling Board experimented with more creative mixtures using potatoes, molasses, and buckwheat, but these alternatives had mixed results, with some keeping qualities inferior to pure wheat bread.

Rice filled the gap whenever the biscuit or bread ran short. Issued on a pound-for-pound basis, rice could substitute for both bread and cheese. Although not as common as biscuit, rice was a familiar breakfast food on the East Indies station, often cooked as a porridge. The official meat ration alternated between salted beef and salted pork, both preserved in brine to last at sea. Pork was typically issued in two-pound pieces, beef in four-pound ones, always by weight rather than by individual cut. Meat was heavily salted for preservation, sometimes with the addition of saltpetre, which turned it pink. Prior to salting, the meat would be cut and checked for proper weight, with strict guidelines on what offal or scraps could be included.

Aside from beef and pork, mutton occasionally served as a substitute meat, mostly in the form of older sheep kept for the sick. Lamb was rarely eaten, as most sheep were valued for wool or milk, and the meat supplied was usually mature and strong-flavoured. Dairy provisions included hard cheese and salted butter, mostly manufactured in England and Ireland. Cheese was often the poor, concrete-hard Suffolk variety, made from skim milk and notorious for its texture. Butter was salted to help it keep, but could easily become rancid if not well-made or kept cool.

Butter and cheese were commonly issued on days without a meat ration and could be eaten with the day's biscuit, or added to oatmeal or pease. Vegetables and fresh fruit were not systematically supplied but were purchased whenever ships had access to ports or local markets. The most commonly acquired vegetables were cabbages, onions, leeks, carrots, and turnips, while pumpkins and various greens also made frequent appearances. Potatoes were rarely purchased, largely due to social perceptions and spoilage issues. Dried peas (pease) were a staple for soups and stews. Citrus fruits, especially lemons and oranges, were bought whenever possible to stave off scurvy.

The supply of fish depended on the crew's success using the ship's fishing tackle. Any fish caught would go first to the sick. In warm waters, flying fish, bonito, porpoises, and even sharks were eaten. Occasionally, creatures such as sea turtles, tortoises, and even alligators were consumed when caught. The official daily drink for sailors was beer, issued in surprisingly generous quantities, with an allowance of one wine-gallon (less than the modern gallon) per man. This was a weak beer, similar to small beer on land, with an alcohol content of only a few percent.

If beer supplies ran out, wine was the next choice, sourced from Mediterranean ports or wherever available. Where neither beer nor wine could be obtained, spirits such as rum, brandy, or arrack were served, but always diluted with water. The rationing and dilution of spirits, later known as grog, originated from the need both to manage intoxication and to ensure adequate hydration. Lemon or lime juice was sometimes added to grog as an antiscorbutic. Rum, particularly, became strongly associated with the Navy, and mixtures like punch or flip were prepared in the wardroom. Tea and cocoa were officially issued only as substitutes for cheese but had become widely consumed at breakfast, with cocoa especially admired for its comforting qualities. Tea was black tea from China, while cocoa came in solid blocks from the West Indies. Water was always available, but strict regulations governed its consumption, especially when supplies ran low or were not easily replenished. Sentries monitored sources to prevent waste.

==== Officers ====
Until the mid-nineteenth century, naval officers received the same official ration as the rest of the crew. They had to supply their own additional food and wine, managing expenses themselves. Captains traditionally received a cask of ox-tongues when a ship was commissioned. Commanders-in-chief were given ‘table money’ to help with the cost of entertaining. Officers were expected to dine more elaborately and at different times than the crew. Breakfast for all might occur at the same hour, but officers typically dined and supped later. In some cases, there were separate meal times even between the captain and other officers. This arrangement helped with watch duties, as some officers could supervise the ship while others ate.

Officers formed messes to share the costs of food and drink, particularly wine and items beyond their allotted rations. The messes were self-financing, with each member contributing regularly. Financial pressure to participate was strong, even if an officer could not afford extras. Officers appointed a caterer from among themselves, who handled money and arranged purchases at port. A ship of the line held two messes for officers: the wardroom for senior officers and the gunroom for junior officers. Warrant officers of the ‘tradesmen’ type, such as boatswains and carpenters, also formed their own mess, often eating separately. Midshipmen had their own berth, saw to their own meals, and often contributed supplies brought from home. These arrangements reflected both status and practicality.

Food preparation relied on skill and available supplies rather than advanced equipment. Ship stoves were capable by the standards of the time. Officers’ stewards or professional cooks prepared meals and handled serving. Wealthy captains and admirals might bring their own cook, steward, or servants, often drawn from crew or personal staff. The officers' pantry and storerooms were stocked with preserved foods, dry goods, spices, pickles, cheeses, chocolates, biscuits, jams, and wine. Sources included port shops, private purchases, gifts, and remittances from home. Officers often exchanged food or shared occasional luxuries with each other. Officers kept livestock such as chickens, ducks, geese, sheep, pigs, and sometimes goats for milk and meat. Some even kept cows for cream. They brought aboard fresh produce and wine from ports. They also hunted game and caught fish or shellfish when possible. Keeping a private store of food and drink was common.

Meal variety was supplemented with preserved or imported goods, such as dried fruit, spices, chutneys, chocolate, coffee, and better qualities of tea. Officers and their guests enjoyed a range of beverages, from wine and punch to spirits, cider, and ale. Social meals included toasts and entertainment, sometimes with music. Menu selections depended on circumstance. A typical meal could include meats, pies, soups, vegetables, puddings, and preserved fruit. Bread and pastries were baked on board, as facilities allowed. Officers improvised in rough weather, offering cold or simple meals when cooking was difficult. The captain and admiral dined separately, maintaining higher standards according to rank and means, but sometimes invited others to join as a courtesy or for instruction.

=== Punishment ===
Royal Navy discipline during the Napoleonic Wars was regulated by an Act of Parliament that collected its standards into 36 Articles of War. These articles, which were read to the crew every month, covered a wide list of infractions that ranged from neglect of duty to capital crimes. Conduct subject to punishment included offences such as drunkenness, profane oaths, scandalous behaviour, desertion, mutiny, cowardice during action, quarrelling, sleeping on watch, embezzling stores, murder, sodomy, theft, and fraudulent reporting, among others. Some articles also addressed the proper observance of Divine service, holding illegal correspondence with the enemy, failing to report traitorous practices, and oppressive or fraudulent conduct by officers.

Officers, marines, petty officers, and sailors could be accused of anything from minor rule-breaking to much more serious offences. For smaller misdemeanours, especially for a first mistake, captains often judged the punishment based on the sailor’s character, sometimes limiting it to a stern admonition. For minor offences such as poor performance or drunkenness, the loss or dilution of grog was a common non-physical penalty. Skilled sailors or petty officers could be reduced in rank and see their pay cut as a punishment. Flogging was the most frequent physical punishment and applied for a wide variety of breaches. Officially, no more than twelve lashes were to be given without a court martial, but many captains ignored this restriction. Guidance stated that no punishment was to be given without a solid reason, nor should it be more severe than the crime warranted, but enforcement of these limits was often poor before 1811. After that year, captains were newly required to send regular reports of punishments to the Admiralty, which attempted to instil more oversight.

Caricature of flogging created by George Cruikshank, 1825

Not every seaman sentenced to flogging actually received it; officers sometimes pleaded for deserving men or those with a history of good conduct, leading to a remission of the punishment, unless the offence was serious. Many experienced seamen managed to avoid ever drawing such penalties, as their skill and reputation helped insulate them. Unofficial punishments existed, often depending on the captain’s discipline style and the culture aboard a particular ship. Informal beatings with a rope’s end or cane, mostly aimed at driving sailors to work harder, were common but were prone to becoming a form of bullying, especially by petty officers. Discontent with this system grew, and by 1809, its use was largely discontinued. One method reserved for particularly antisocial crimes like theft was running the gauntlet. This involved the offender being made to walk between two lines of shipmates who struck him with ropes or sticks. This method was used as the crime did not just break the rules but directly harmed relationships among the crew.

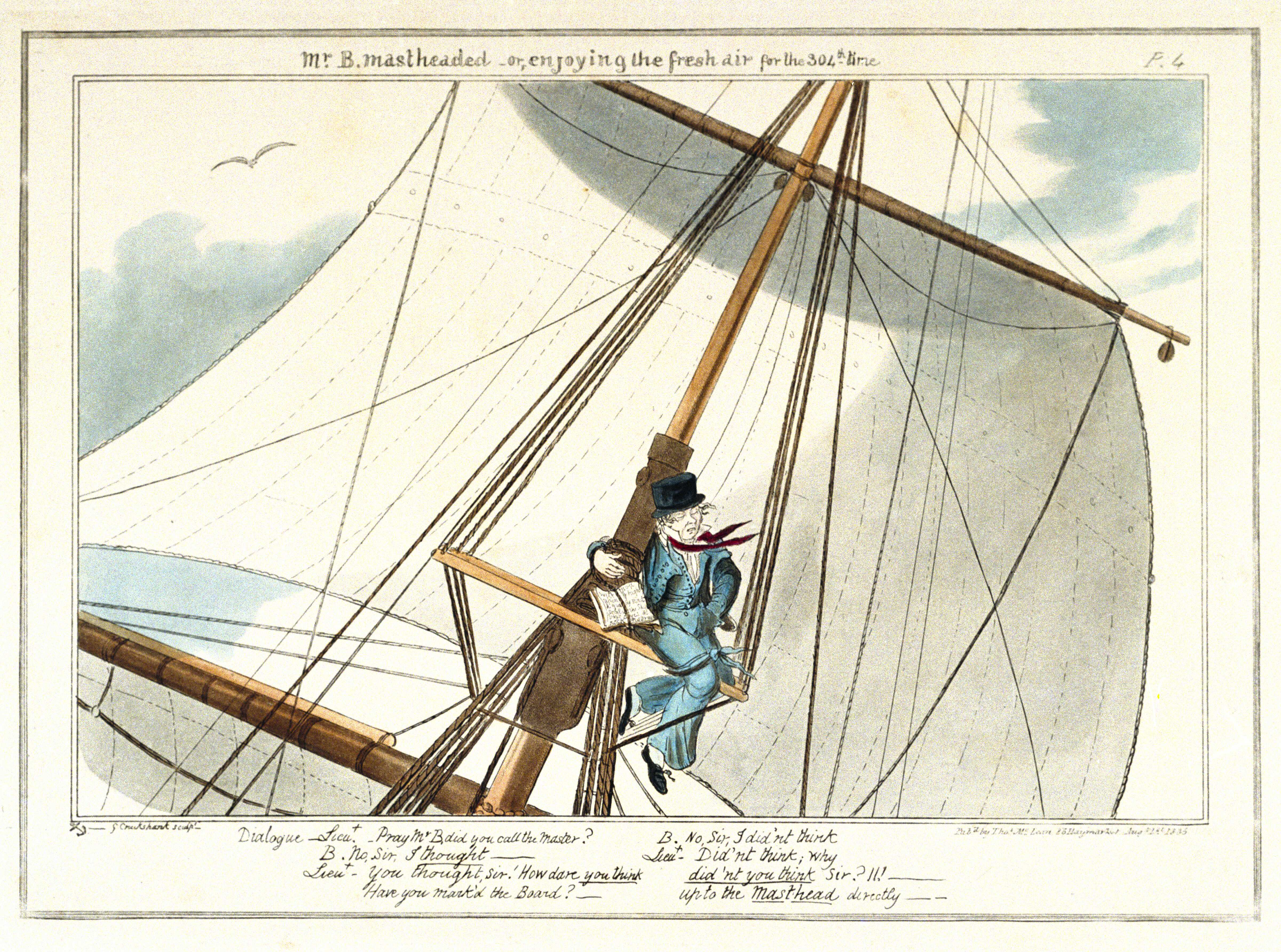
A midshipman mastheaded. Caricature by George Cruikshank

Midshipmen, who were officer candidates, were rarely flogged. Instead, they were punished by being sent to the masthead or by being tied to the shrouds for a period of time, punishments that carried embarrassment and discomfort rather than physical pain. More severe offences could result in a court martial, which might impose the penalty of flogging round the fleet. In this ordeal, the offender was rowed from one ship in the fleet to another, receiving lashes at each, sometimes summing to hundreds or even over a thousand. Such punishments left men with long term injuries, both physical and mental, and although a surgeon attended the process to halt it if a sailor was at risk of dying, the flogging would resume the next day if necessary.

For the most serious crimes, including murder, mutiny, or buggery, the articles allowed for hanging. A yellow flag was raised to indicate an execution was scheduled. Before the execution, the crime and the sentence were read aloud to the assembled crew, then a gun was fired and the offender was hanged from the fore yardarm. The body remained visible for some time as a warning to others. Justice on board also extended to the way disputes were handled. Occasionally, other crew members might settle minor disputes or punish misbehaviour themselves, but if such unofficial justice became public knowledge, it could also be punished by the captain. The power to choose and enforce punishments before 1811 was largely in the captain’s hands, and his judgment, temperament, and leadership style could result in either a fair or a harsh environment. Sailors often became rebellious not simply due to punishments themselves but because of perceived injustice or unfair treatment.

=== Medical service ===
During the Napoleonic wars, disease accounted for about half of Royal Navy casualties. Common illnesses included fevers, ulcers, rheumatism, dysentery, and venereal diseases. Scurvy, which once posed a severe threat, had become rare due to improved diets. Surgeons serving on warships were able to perform procedures such as trepanation, lithotomy, and removal of musket balls. Medical care had improved during the eighteenth century because surgeons gained access to better instruments, medical chests, and dedicated sickbays on ships as well as naval hospitals ashore. Ships normally carried a surgeon and up to three assistants depending on size, giving a typical ratio of one medical staff per 200 crew members.

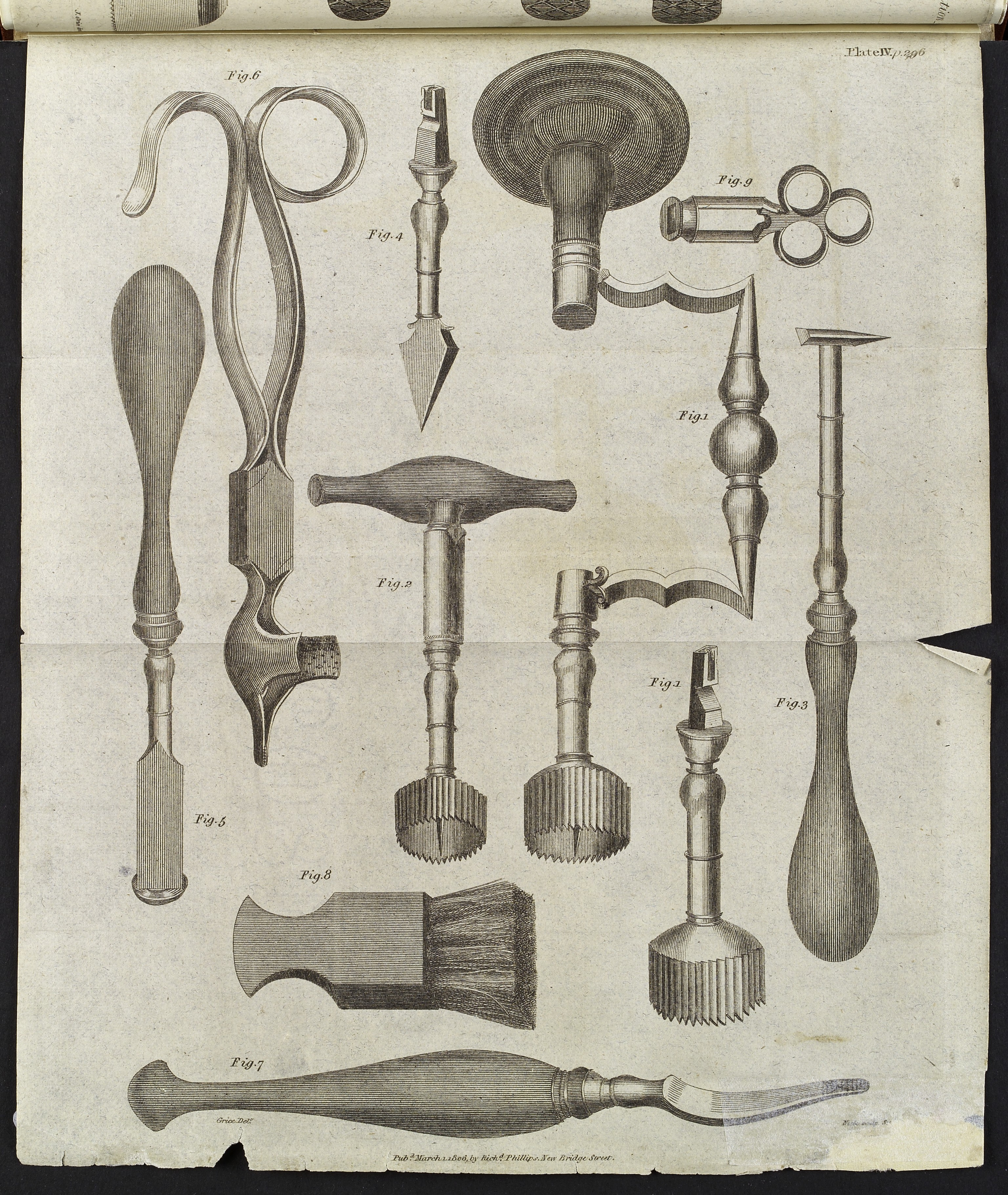
Complete set of trepanning instruments from The naval surgeon; Comprising the Entire Duties of Professional Men at Sea by William Turnbull 1806

The Navy often struggled to recruit enough surgeons, as the profession was not well respected or paid. Reforms in 1806 increased pay and improved working conditions, leading to some progress. Surgeons held lower status compared to physicians. There were no anaesthetics and only basic surgery was possible. Physicians, who held more prestige, usually worked in naval hospitals or in fleet-level supervisory roles. On board, the surgeon visited the sick twice daily, kept a detailed journal covering diseases and operations, and submitted a daily sick list to the captain. He and his assistants also examined all new sailors for illnesses or conditions that might make them unfit for service.

Early sickbays were often installed in overcrowded and poorly ventilated areas near the lower decks. By the late 1790s, a design by Captain Markham moved sickbays to partitioned sections of the upper deck under the forecastle, providing better air and light and access to privies. This model was widely adopted but not in every ship. Sickbays were equipped with a dispensary and cradles for the injured. Most patients slept in hammocks. The surgeon’s cabin, mates' shared quarters, and medical stores were usually located below deck. The cockpit served as an operating area during battles, offering some protection but requiring the wounded to be carried down by ladder. Assistants known as "loblolly boys" escorted patients and helped with care.

In periods of high illness, patients were placed where space allowed, including the cable tiers or upper rooms. Wounds were treated based on arrival time, without regard to rank. Infectious diseases such as typhus often spread in the crowded conditions of ships. Officers ordered regular cleaning and ventilation, but diseases persisted. Other problems included hernias, gravel (urinary stones), and mental illness. Many accidents also caused death or injury. Professional nursing did not exist; hospital nurses were often untrained and sometimes dismissed for misconduct. The strain of shipboard life, combined with exposure and alcohol, led to various physical and mental complaints.

The Royal Hospital at Greenwich was the most well-known facility, serving as a home for old or disabled sailors as well as some officers. It operated with both military and civilian administrators, a physician, surgeon, dispenser, assistants, and matrons. Modern hospitals were constructed at Haslar, Plymouth, and Deal, with others opening at locations around the British Isles and overseas. Patients arriving at these hospitals underwent washing, disinfection, and received clean clothing. Diet plans and hygiene routines were maintained.

Hospitals contracted staff and non-medical services. Regular inspections by naval officers aimed to keep standards high. Problems with discipline and staff absences led to reforms such as banning private practices by hospital doctors starting in 1795. In locations without shore hospitals, old ships were sometimes used as floating hospitals. The care provided was better than that typically found outside the Navy at the time, though nursing standards and hygiene would not meet modern expectations.

== Routine ==
The day on board the ship was based on a 24-hour watch system, with each watch lasting four respectively two hours. The system was divided between port and starboard watches, which had different tasks during the day. After a period of 24 hours, the tasks were swapped between the two watches so that all duties were distributed fairly. Each watch was divided into groups with the same number of men. The day started (Note: Traditionally the day started at noon as this was the time when the position of the sun was checked.) with the middle watch lasting from midnight to 4.00 a.m. Shortly before 4.00 am.m the quartermaster on duty would wake the lieutenant, mates and midshipmen of the next watch. Next was the morning watch from 4.00 to 8.00 a.m. This was the time to sleep for those who had finished their 24 hours period.

At about 4.30 a.m., the boatswain and the carpenter would come on deck to begin repair work. The cook would begin preparing for breakfast. At 5.00 a.m. the decks were washed. Breakfast was served at 8 a.m. With this work finished at 7.00 a.m. the casks of food and drink from the hold for that day´s use was brought to the steward´s room for issue. Shortly before 8.00 a.m. hammocks were lashed and stowed. With the breakfast served at 8.00 a.m. forenoon watch lasting until noon had started. After breakfast, decks were swept and mess utensils stowed. At 9:30 a.m., sailors and marines assembled for divisions, a daily parade and inspection. If punishments were due, they were carried out at this time in front of the entire crew. The duties often included gun drills, sail repairs, and maintenance; by 10 a.m., daily work for the idlers began.

At 11:30 a.m., the order for “up spirits” allowed men their daily grog ration. (Note: The grog could also be served after dinner)Dinner followed at noon. During the afternoon watch from noon to 4.00 p.m. for those who were off duty there was time for leisure where men could rest. Beginning with the first dog watch at 4.00 p.m. “Up spirits” was called again following the supper at 5.00 p.m. Coiling up the ropes and sweeping up the decks were the last tasks of the day. The second dog watch lasting from 6.00 p.m. to 8.00 p.m. was again leisure time. Starting with the first watch from 8.00 p.m. to midnight hammocks were brought down for those who had now finished their 24 hours period. Sundays and Thursdays were special routines. On these days, men washed, shaved, and wore clean clothes. Saturday afternoons were set aside for mending and preparing uniforms. Sunday morning included extra inspections and a church service on the quarterdeck. Officers and marines turned out in full uniform.

== Uniforms and ranks ==
=== Officers ===
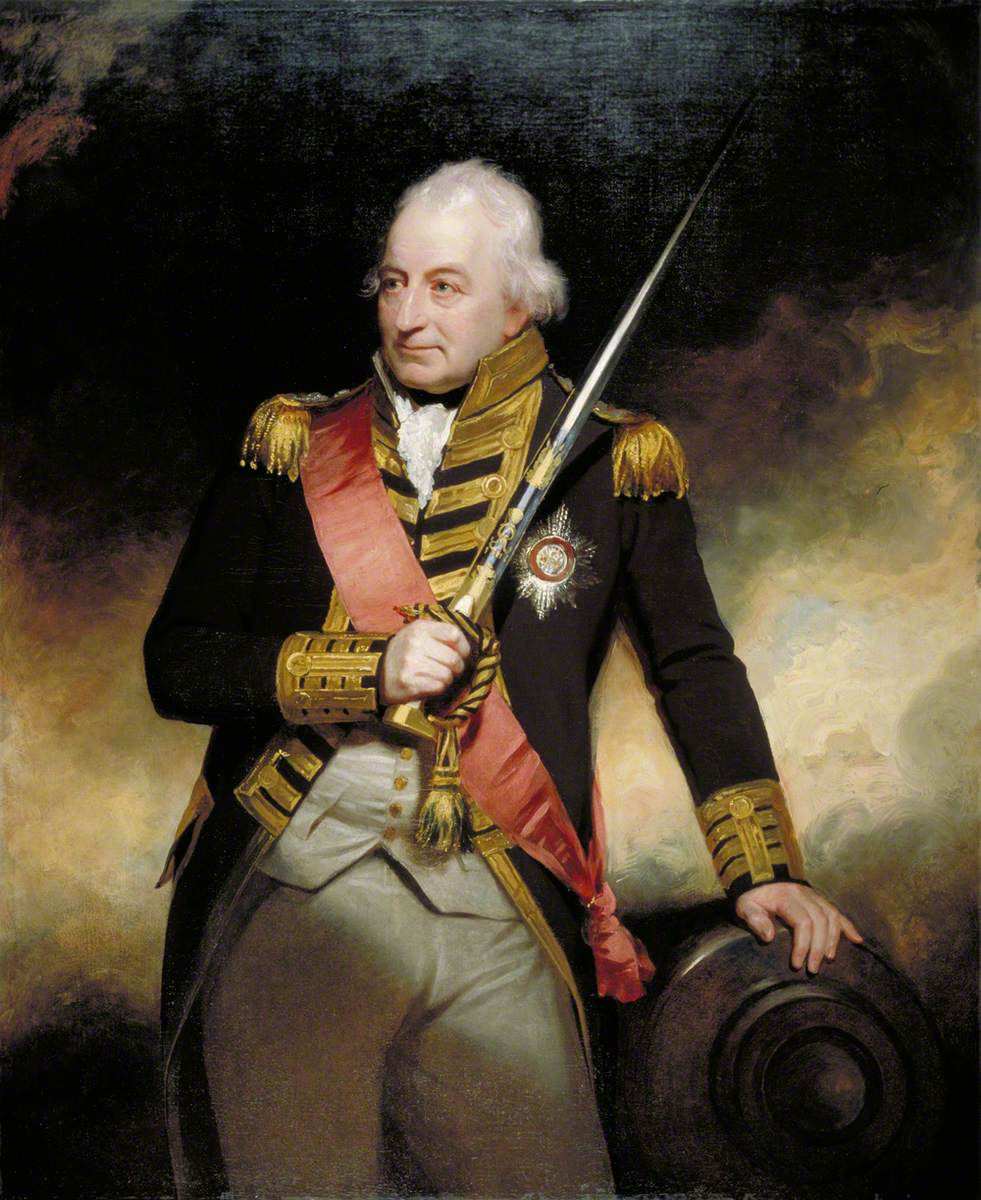
Portrait of John Jervis, Earl of St Vincent (1752–1820) in admiral’s full-dress uniform, 1795–1812, with the ribbon and star of the Order of the Bath.

During the Napoleonic wars, the uniform of Royal Navy flag officers, captains, and commanders followed the regulations introduced on 1 June 1795 and remained consistent until 1812. Coats were made from navy-blue cloth with blue facings and a standing blue collar edged in gold lace. Blue turnback lapels were also edged in gold lace, with nine buttonholes featuring the same gold pattern. The round cuffs carried three rows of gold lace for admirals, with three vertical gilt buttons at the upper edge and further gold lace on slits and pockets. Pockets also included three buttons under the flaps, decorated by three faux buttonholes. Epaulettes, adopted officially in 1795, featured a gold lace strap, a row of 20 bullion fringes, and silver-embroidered stars distinguished rank: three stars for admirals, two for vice admirals, and one for rear admirals. Each epaulette was also fastened by a gilt brass button. The pattern for buttons introduced in 1787 depicted a fouled anchor inside a beaded circle, surrounded by a laurel wreath. This button’s design endured for decades.

Officers paired this with a white waistcoat, white breeches, stockings, and black shoes with brass buckles. Their hats, from 1795, were gold-laced and changed from being cocked on three sides to two, with a taller back, straighter front, gold bullion fringe for admirals, and an ornamented flap with a gold lace strap and button. The undress uniform was similar but lacked ornamentation on the lapels, collar, and pocket flaps, and retained the same hat and epaulettes. Captains’ uniforms, after the 1795 changes, dropped the traditional white lapels and cuffs, replacing them with blue. Gold lace edged all main parts of the coat including tails and lapels. Captains under three years’ post wore one epaulette, senior captains wore two. Officers often wore cocked hats “fore and aft,” decorated with gold bullion tassels, though not all strictly followed dress codes.

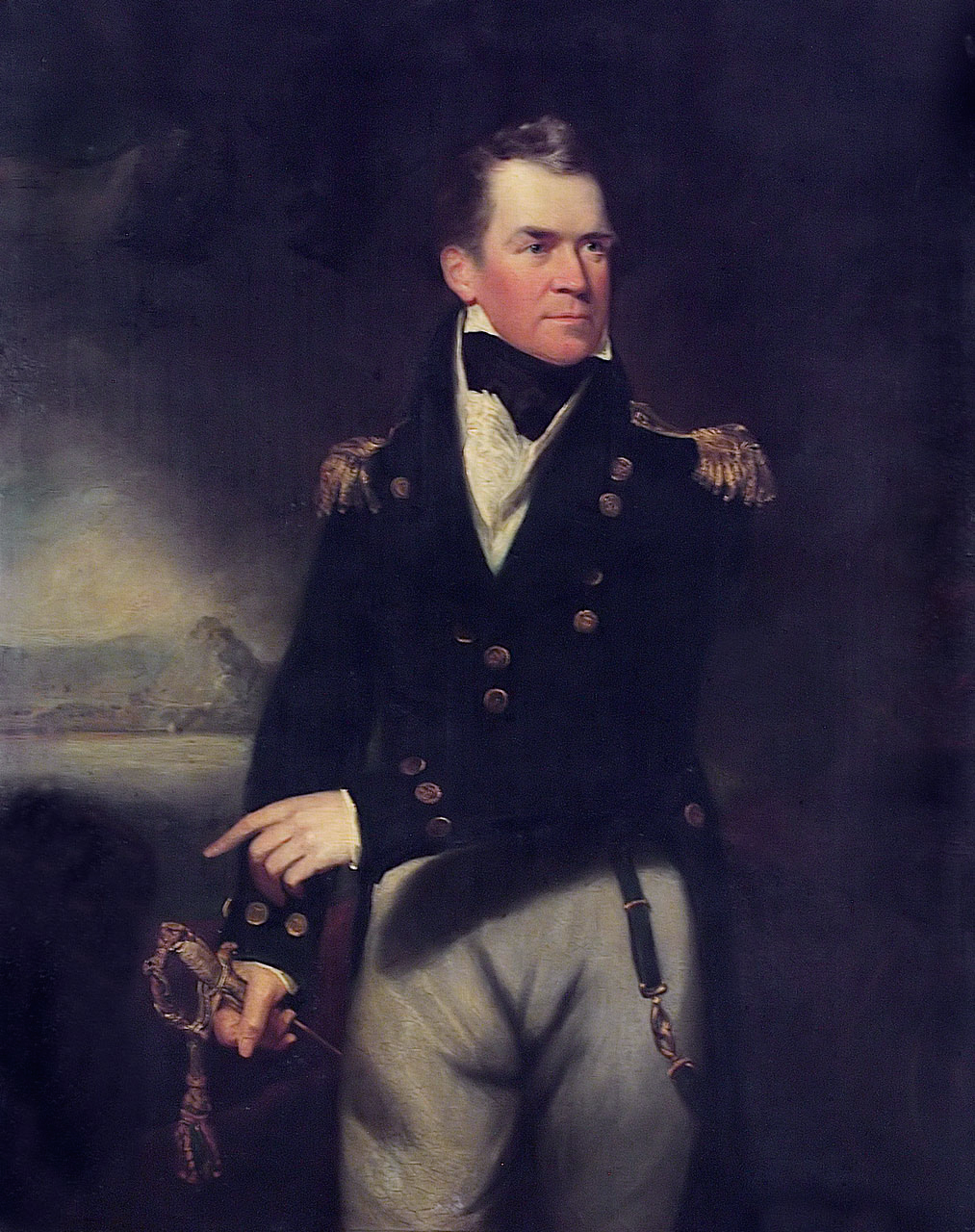
A three-quarter-length portrait of Sir George Ralph Collier wearing captain's undress uniform of over three years, 1812-25.

The undress coat for captains, applicable for those who had been in service for over three years, was made of plain navy-blue cloth with a stand-and-fall collar. It featured no lace ornamentation, and the lapels, fitted with eight brass buttons, could be fastened or left open, similar to the full dress coat. The coat lacked slashed cuffs and instead had false round cuffs adorned with three brass buttons. The pockets were plain yet also displayed a three-button decoration, matching that of the full dress coat. Epaulettes were optional and were attached via straps passing through lace on the shoulder.

Lieutenants wore navy-blue coats with blue standing collars and white lapels fastened by nine brass buttons (fouled anchor design), and no epaulettes. Their hats were of black felt, lacking gold lace but featuring gold bullion tassels. In undress, lieutenants used simpler navy coats with piped white collars and cuffs, and epaulettes remained optional. Midshipmen dressed in single-breasted navy blue coats with standing collars that featured a distinctive white patch at each side and brass buttons. Three buttons on their blue cuffs were meant, legendarily, to prevent them from wiping their noses on their sleeves. They wore white waistcoats and breeches as regulation, with grey for everyday use in some cases. Their felt cocked hats were oriented across rather than fore-and-aft.

=== Warrant officers ===
Warrant officers, including masters, pursers, gunners, boatswains, and carpenters, had uniforms first introduced in 1787 and largely unchanged until 1807. Their coats were navy-blue, with a simple fall-down collar and blue lapels fastened by brass buttons (previous captain’s pattern, with a fouled anchor). Cuffs and back pockets were trimmed with three brass buttons. The lining was white, and worn with a matching waistcoat and breeches. The plain cocked hat distinguished these ranks from the more extravagant officers. Mates’ uniforms were similar but could be edged, with blue round cuffs and three buttons.

=== Marines ===
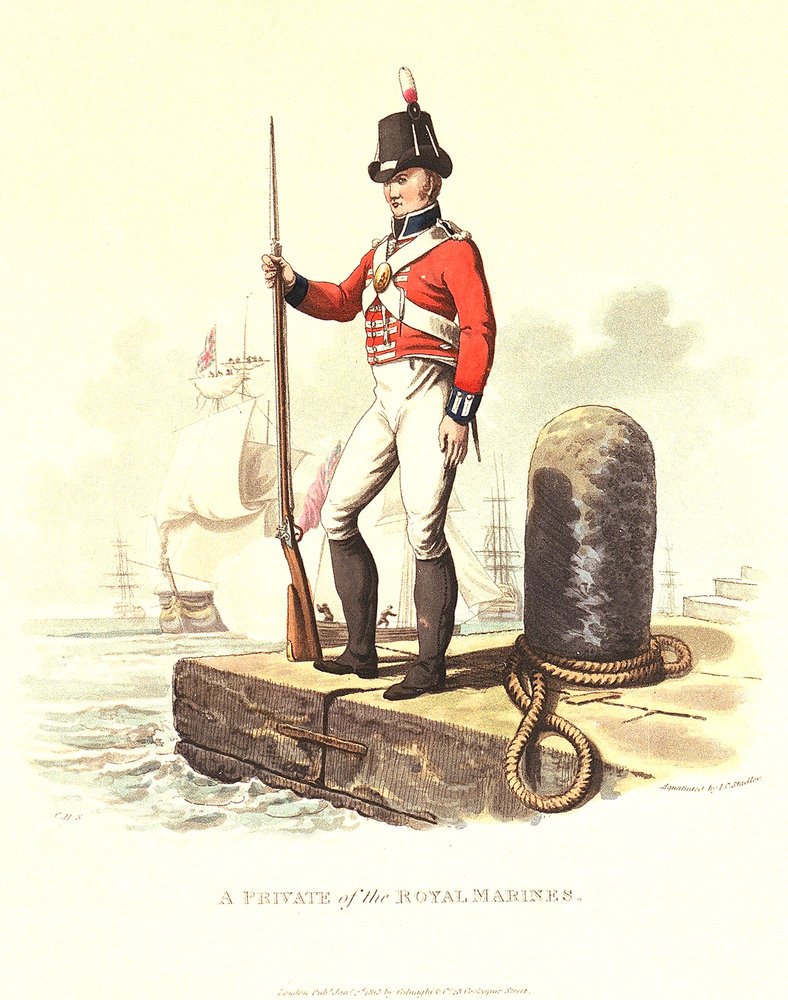
1815 illustration of a Royal Marine private by Charles Hamilton Smith

Marines’ uniforms, modelled after army standards but often a few years behind, were regulated by the Navy Board. From 1802, with the award of the “Royal” title, marines wore red cloth coats faced with blue, white waistcoats and breeches, and hats conforming to sealed patterns. The most recognizable marine feature at this time was the glazed leather hat with a white-bound brim, cords at the sides, and a short red-and-white plume from the left cockade. Officers kept cocked hats, switching from three-cornered to two-cornered by the early nineteenth century.

Coats were single-breasted with ten buttons in pairs, tape-edged buttonholes, a blue cloth collar edged with the same tape, and blue-shouldered straps with white fringes. Cuffs had four buttons and regimental-pattern tape. Marines wore white breeches with gaiters for full dress, using black gaiters and linen trousers for other occasions. Coats for other ranks descended from earlier full-length designs but were generally more closed and shorter by the early nineteenth century. Coats showed their facing colour on lapels, collars, and cuffs; after 1802 these were blue. Greatcoats, worn for cold or wet weather, were royal blue with red collars. Equipment included white leather crossbelts supporting a black ammunition pouch and bayonet scabbard.

With the exception of grenadiers, who wore fur caps with a regimental emblem in front, Marines had originally worn the light infantry hat with a huge plume over the top. This changed to a featherless hat with two tapes cocking it up on either side by the early 19th century. The hat had a little taper toward the top and was composed of glazed leather. Officers wore coats that were similar to the men's, except they were scarlet instead of red and of far higher quality.

== Equipment ==
=== Ships ===
In the early 19th century there were three kind of warships: the ship of the line, the frigate and minor ships like the sloop. The warships of the Royal Navy were classified according to the numbers of their guns. There were 6 rates whom the first three were ships of the line. The last three classes were frigates. All other ships such as sloops or bomb vessels were unrated.

- 100 or more guns first rate
- 90 to 98 guns second rate
- 64 to 80 guns third rate
- 50 to 60 guns fourth rate
- 32 to 44 guns fifth rate
- 28 guns sixth rate

=== Artillery ===
Naval artillery in the Royal Navy was produced under the Ordnance Board at ironworks in Scotland and Northern England. Guns were tested at Woolwich with heavy charges and inspected for flaws before being approved. Once passed, they were sent to naval depots and distributed as required. Guns were muzzle-loading with a basic cast-iron design, typically classified as either long or short. Long guns were more accurate at up to 400 yards and could be fired level, while short guns required an elevated angle to reach the same distance. Most guns were made of iron, with brass guns being rare and costly. Each gun had several distinct parts, including the breach, cascable, reinforce sections, chase, and muzzle, with the bore running the length of the tube.

Powder was loaded at the rear through a chamber and the touch-hole allowed ignition. Trunnions on the side supported the gun on its carriage and were marked for identification. Guns came in two varieties: carronades and cannons. The British called naval cannons of various sizes and weights "great guns" to differentiate them from "small arms" like muskets and pistols. All guns were named by the weight of their shots, ranging from 68 to 6 pounder. Carronades, shorter and lighter guns developed by the Carron Company, required less powder and could be moved quickly across a wide angle due to castor-mounted carriages. Carronades were mainly used at close ranges and fired heavier shot. However, they had shorter range and were less effective than long guns in distant engagements.

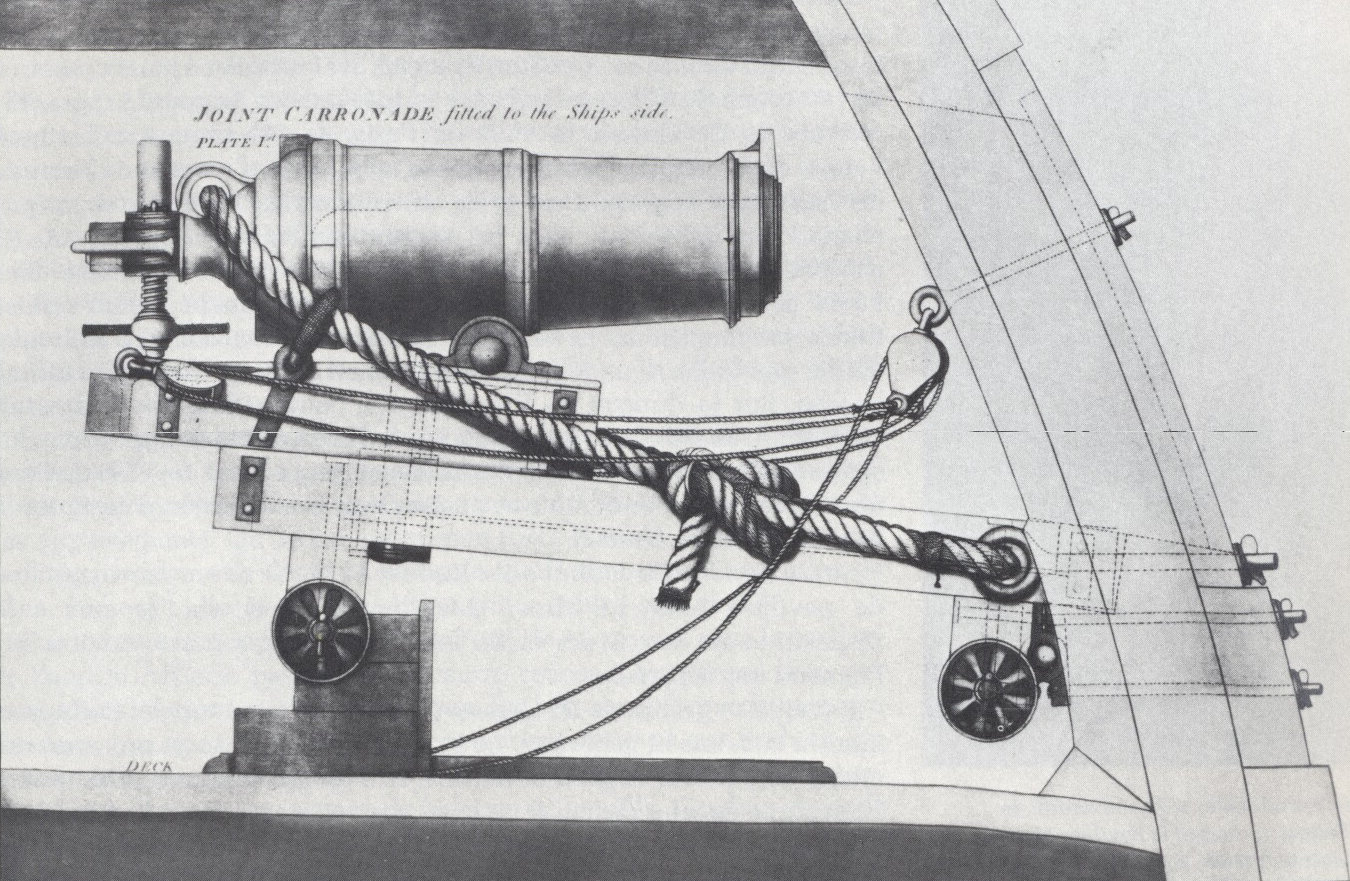
Schematic representation of a carronade from the late 18th or early 19th century.

The damage a shot could inflict depended on range, charge, and velocity. At close range, shot caused splintering and significant harm to crews. Point-blank fire, defined by the normal charge, reached up to 400 yards for larger guns. Double-shotted guns or grapeshot had reduced range and penetration, while roundshot remained the common ammunition for hull attacks. Special ammunition included dismantling shot such as bar shot and chain-shot for rigging, and anti-personnel rounds like grapeshot and canister. Grapeshot spread iron balls across the deck, effective up to about 600 yards, mostly from upper-deck guns. Canister was similar but used smaller projectiles and had an effective range up to 350 yards, making it suitable for close defence, particularly from carronades.

The Royal Navy used a variety of weapons suited to combat at sea and during boarding actions. The main firearm for infantry was a flintlock musket, a shorter version of the Army’s Brown Bess. Two types were in use: the bright sea-service musket with polished metal parts, typically reserved for parades and guard duties, and the black sea-service musket, intended for fighting since its blacked barrel avoided catching sunlight that could reveal a shooter’s position. Marines and seamen usually fired muskets from their own ship’s decks and rigging to drive off enemy defenders, especially before boarding. During enemy attempts to board, controlled musket fire could knock attackers off rigging or gunwales.

Bayonets, attached to the muskets, could be effective for repelling boarders in the brief moments as they climbed over the ship’s side. Pistols for sea service usually had heavy brass butt plates that could be used as a club for hand-to-hand fights. For close combat during boarding, the cutlass was preferred. It had a straight blade, typically 28 to 30 inches long. Boarding parties also used pikes, which were simple spears. The boarding axe was common, designed with a curved spike at the back, a hooked blade, and a belt hook for carrying. Marines and sailors might carry swords or dirks, but these were more often markers of status than practical fighting tools. Hand grenades consisted of hollow iron balls filled with gunpowder. These could be thrown onto enemy decks to cause confusion and casualties during close combat.

== Warfare ==
=== Tactics ===
Naval tactics in the Royal Navy during the Napoleonic era focused on gaining positional advantage to deliver effective gunfire while minimizing the enemy’s ability to respond. Fleet commanders aimed to bring more ships and firepower to bear at a decisive point, coordinating manoeuvres both at the single-ship and squadron level. Success in action depended on both manoeuvre and gunnery. Due to lack of effective range finding methods battles took place at point-blank range typically within 200 yards to overwhelm their opponents through heavy and precise fire.

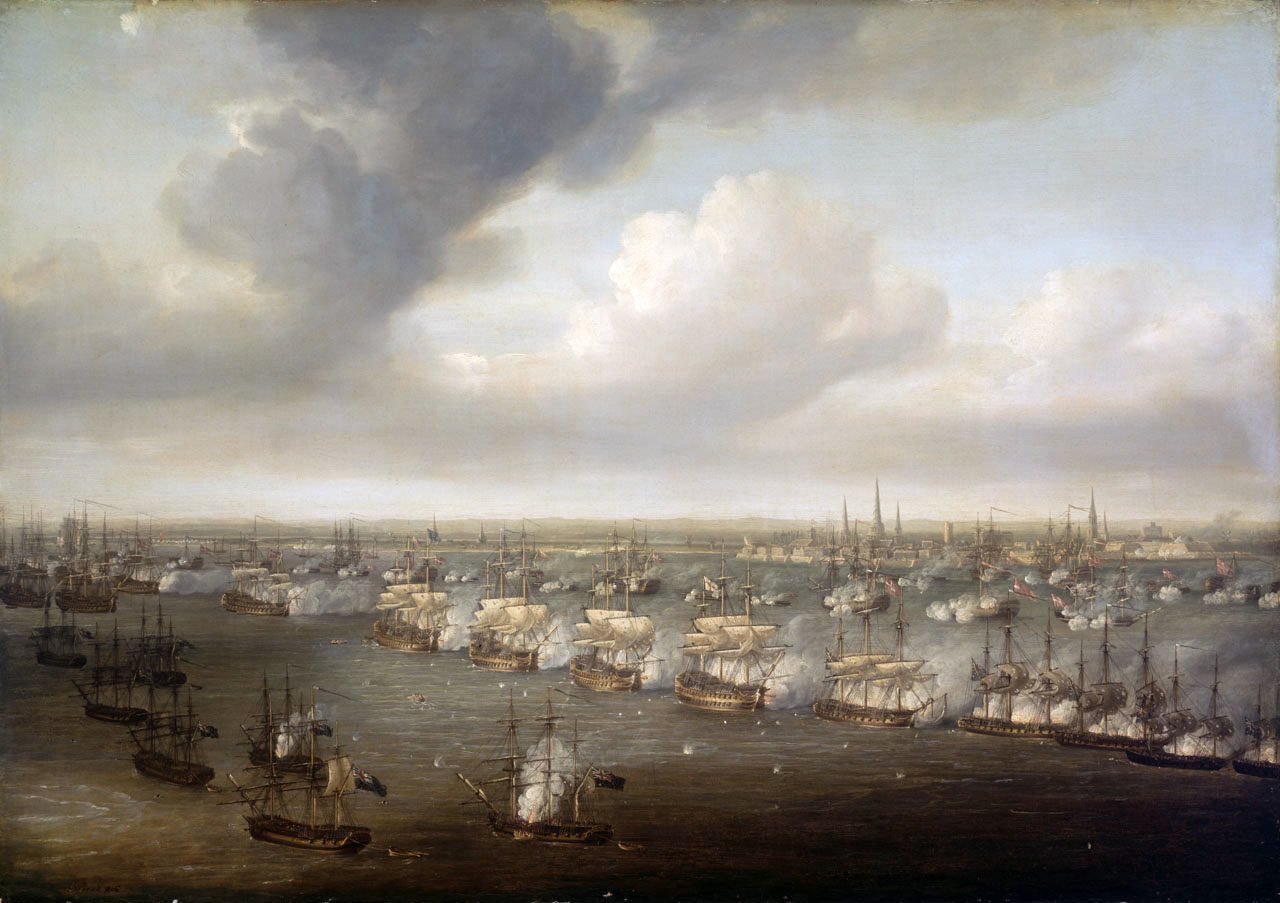
The Battle of Copenhagen on 2 April 1801 showing the British fleet in line of battle, delivering broadsides to the Danish fleet.

Broadside fire was most powerful at right angles to the ship’s hull. Captains manoeuvred to maximize use of their broadsides and reduce exposure to enemy fire. Most ships-of-the-line did not mount bow or stern chasers, so firing directly ahead or astern was limited. British ships improved their ability to shift gun angles up to 45 degrees off the beam by changing ring bolt arrangements for side tackles. In a chase, to bring guns to bear often meant turning and thereby reducing speed, making it hard to close with an opponent of equal sailing qualities. To catch an enemy, a captain drove his ship forward on maximum sail and held fire until close. If possible, a bow chaser might be fired at the enemy’s masts or rigging to reduce speed.

Achieving and keeping advantageous positions, such as on the bow or quarter of the enemy, was a central element of tactics. Both bow and stern were the weakest parts of a ship; the stern especially was less protected and vulnerable to destructive fire. Raking—firing along the length of an enemy from either bow or stern—could inflict severe casualties and damage to the ship and crew. Only a single broadside was typically possible before further manoeuvre was needed.

There were also critics of raking fire, such as Rear Admiral Philip Broke, then Captain of HMS Shannon. Although he acknowledged “its destructive effect,” he argued that “the failure of it sometimes even when delivered from the most favourable positions, is so astonishing that it can only be credited from observed facts.” Broke further argued that the effectiveness of raking fire was often overestimated as there could only one broadside delivered while ships approaching the enemy could also receive heavy damage. The smoke from the initial discharge often obscures the aim of subsequent gunners rendering raking fire ineffective at most ranges.

Captains judged enemy strength and distance by observing ship profiles and crew movement from afar, using experience to estimate size and range. Clear weather allowed long-range visibility, with closer ranges judged by movement and appearance of personnel, aiding decisions about when to open fire. Holding the weather gauge or windward position gave British ships greater control over if, when and how to attack. The weather gauge also made it easier to double the enemy line and provided better visibility by carrying smoke away. Ships in the windward position might face difficulty withdrawing if damaged, as they would be pushed toward the enemy by the wind. Fleet formations before engagement were usually line ahead, with ships spaced at 200 to 400 yards. Frigates scouted ahead and to the sides, passing signals as needed. Fleets sometimes adopted line of bearing or echelon approaches for faster or more aggressive action. Direction changes could be ordered “in succession,” with ships turning one by one, or “together,” with all ships turning at once in unison.

Engagements often began with fleets approaching each other head-on or at an angle. End-on and oblique approaches might involve passing and exchanging broadsides in succession, often with inconclusive results. More decisive tactics included breaking the enemy’s line at a point, which could enable raking fire and concentration of force to cut off and overwhelm segments of the enemy. A notable tactic was crossing the T, where one fleet sailed at right angles across the head of an enemy line. This allowed the crossing fleet to concentrate its broadside fire on the leading ships of the enemy, which could not respond effectively since their guns only faced forward. In practice, with the short range and slow reloads of the era’s guns, this tactic’s advantages could be limited, but it remained a recognized method for massing firepower on part of the enemy formation.

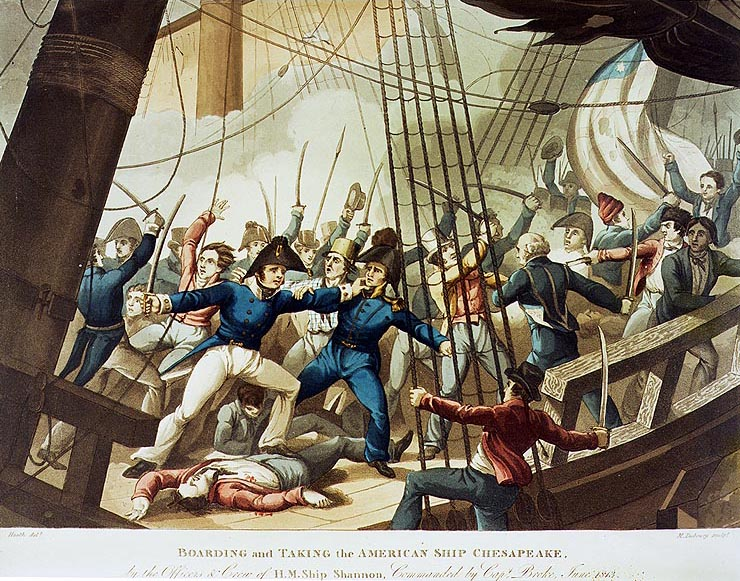
A depiction of the engagement between the American Navy frigate USS Chesapeake and the Royal Navy frigate H.M.S. Shannon on 1 June 1813 off the coast of Halifax, Nova Scotia Canada. The officers and crew of the Shannon, commanded by Captain Philip Broke, are shown boarding and capturing the Chesapeake.

Doubling the enemy’s line placed opposing ships between two fires, forcing them to fight on both sides and usually overwhelming their firepower and crew. When lines broke and direct combat began, individual captains managed their ships independently, aiming to bring guns to bear on the nearest foe. This melee fighting relied on seamanship and judgement on the part of each captain. Boarding actions were used to attempt to capture enemy ships by getting physically attached, often by entangling rigging or using grapnels. Success depended on first sweeping the deck clear with musketry, grenades, and gunfire. The best chance for boarding came when the attacker could drive the enemy’s bowsprit into its own rigging, providing a bridge and an opportunity to rake. Boarding teams were organized from gun crews, grenadiers, and swordsmen, supported by regular training and preparation.

=== Signalling ===
The Royal Navy’s signal system was first developed scientifically in the 1780s by Admiral Richard Kempenfelt. He created a flaghoist method using 12 banners to represent the numbers 0 to 9, along with first and second repeater flags. His system used a ten by ten table which linked each flag position to a number between 1 and 100, each corresponding to a specific instruction or term. In 1803, Admiral Home Popham expanded the system with a signal book containing close to 3,000 numeric codes for words, phrases, and sentences. His use of three and four flag combinations allowed for a vocabulary of around 30,000 words. (Note: The main principle was the reliance on numbers to represent coded instructions, which were detailed in secret documents given to ship captains. If capture became imminent, captains were expected to destroy the codes.)

During daylight, signalling was carried out by hoisting combinations of coloured flags (blue, black, red, yellow) on dedicated halyards, with each flag or combination representing numbers, letters, or orders. Signals were kept flying until they were acknowledged, either by repeating the signal or by hoisting an answering pennant. Ships could fire a gun to attract attention if there was uncertainty about the signal being seen, and subordinate flagships were required to repeat the signals from the commander-in-chief.

The most important signals were usually made while the fleet was close together before the start of battle, as confusion and smoke could make signalling difficult once fighting began. If the signal was a number only, a blue and yellow chequered pennant was used; with two or three flags, the upper flags denoted tens or hundreds. Balls were used to indicate thousands. Some single flags had specific preset meanings, and a preparatory flag signalled that orders were not to be obeyed until the signal was taken down.

At night, flags were replaced by lanterns, rockets, and gunfire. Lanterns signalled numbers from one to four, a rocket stood for five, a single cannon for ten, and two cannons for twenty. Numbers from one to seventy-nine could be sent in this way. During action, different shaped lanterns marked multiples of ten. A risk of night signalling was revealing a ship’s position to both friend and enemy, so lanterns were kept covered until needed and placed for best visibility. In fog, visual signals could not be used; instead, sound was used, such as guns, muskets, bells, or drums, but the system was limited to basic commands.

== Bibliography ==
- Adkin, Mark (2005). The Trafalgar Companion. London: Aurum Press. ISBN 1-8451-3018-9.
- Adkins, Roy (2009). Jack Tar: Life in Nelson´s Navy. London: Abacus. ISBN 0-3491-2034-X.
- Bishop, William John (2010). Knife, Fire and Boiling Oil : the Early History of Surgery. London: Robert Hale. ISBN 978-0-7090-9155-4.
- Clowes, William Laird (1997a). The Royal Navy, A History from the Earliest Times to 1900. Vol. IV. London: Chatham Publishing. ISBN 1-86176-013-2.
- Clowes, William Laird (1997b). The Royal Navy, A History from the Earliest Times to 1900,. Vol. V. Chatham Publishing. ISBN 1-86176-014-0.
- Davies, David (1997). Nelson's Navy : English Fighting Ships, 1793-1815. Mechanicsburg: Stackpole Books. ISBN 0-8117-1118-8.
- Delafons, John (1805). A Treatise on Naval Courts Martial. London: P. Steel.
- Fabb, John (1977). The Uniforms of Trafalgar. London: B.T. Batsford. ISBN 0-7134-0218-0.
- Kemp, Peter (1969). History of the Royal Navy. New York: Putnam. OCLC 31446.
- Knight, R. J. B. (2013). Britain against Napoleon : the Organization of Victory, 1793-1815. London: Allen Lane. ISBN 1-8461-4177-X.
- Lambert, Andrew (2000). War at Sea in the Age of the Sail. London: Cassell. ISBN 0-304-35246-2.
- Lavery, Brian (2011). Royal Tars: The Lower Deck of the Royal Navy, 857-1850. Annapolis, Maryland: Naval Institute Press. ISBN 978-1-5911-4743-5.
- Lavery, Brian (1989). Nelson's Navy. Annapolis, Maryland: Naval Institute Press. ISBN 0-8702-1258-3.
- Lewis, Michael (1960). A Social History of the Navy 1793-1815. London: Allen and Unwin.
- Lowry, James (2006). Fiddlers and Whores: The Candid Memoirs of a Surgeon in Nelson's Fleet. London: Chatham Publishing. ISBN 978-1-861-76268-9.
- Macdonald, Janet (2006). Feeding Nelson's Navy : the True Story of Food at Sea in the Georgian Era. London: Chatham. ISBN 1-8617-6288-7.
- Miller, Nathan (2005). Broadsides: The Age of Fighting Sail, 1775-1815. Edison: Castle Books. ISBN 0-7858-2022-1.
- Padfield, Peter (2000). Nelson's War. Ware: Wordsworth Military Library. ISBN 1-84022-225-5.
- Padfield, Peter (1974). Guns at Sea. New York: St. Martin's Press.
- Perrin, William Gordon (1922). British Flags, their Early History, and their Development at Sea; with an Account of the Origin of the Flag as a National Device. Cambridge: Cambridge University Press.
- Pope, Dudley (1987). Life in Nelson's Navy. Annapolis: Naval Institute Press. ISBN 0-8702-1346-6.
- Rodger, N. A. M. (2004). The Command of the Ocean : a Naval History of Britain 1649-1815. London: Allen Lane. ISBN 0-7139-9411-8.
- Rodger, N. A. M. (1986). The Wooden World : an Anatomy of the Georgian Navy. London: Collins. ISBN 0-0021-6548-1.
- Tucker, Spencer (2000). Handbook of 19th Century Naval Warfare. Annapolis: Naval Institute Press. ISBN 1-5575-0322-2.
- Volo, Dorothy Denneen; Volo, James M. (2002). Daily Life in the Age of Sail. Westport: Greenwood Press. ISBN 0-313-31026-2.
- Warner, Oliver (1981). Great Sea Battles. New York: Exeter Books. ISBN 0-89673-100-6.
- Wilson, Ben (2014). Empire of the deep: the rise and fall of the British Navy. London: Phoenix. ISBN 978-0-7538-2920-2.
- Wrixon, Fred (2005). Codes, Ciphers & other Cryptic & Clandestine Communication : Making and Breaking Secret Messages from Hieroglyphs to the Internet. New York: Black Dog & Leventhal Paperbacks. ISBN 1-5791-2485-2.
