= Mario di Calasio =

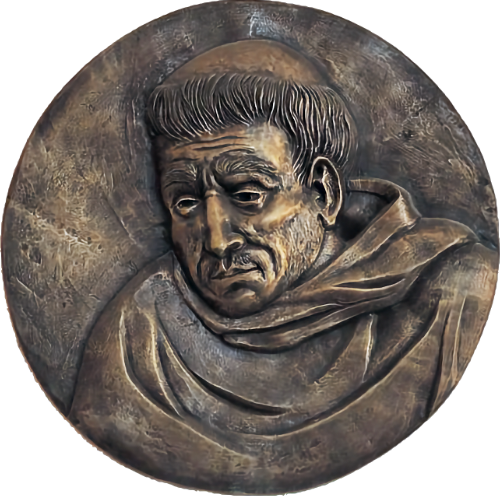
- Commemorative plaque in Calascio
- Born: 1550; Calascio, Kingdom of Naples
- Died: 1 February 1620 (aged 69–70); Rome, Papal States
- Occupations: Franciscan friar, university teacher, orientalist
- Known for: Concordantiae Sacrorum Bibliorum Hebraicorum

Academic background
- Influences: Isaac Nathan ben Kalonymus

Academic work
- Discipline: Hebrew scholar, Ancient Near Eastern Linguist
- Sub-discipline: Bible scholar
- Influenced: Luke Wadding; William Romaine; Edward Rowe Mores

Mario di Calasio (1550 in Calascio, Abruzzi, Italy – February 1, 1620 in Ara Coeli) was an Italian Minorite friar.

== Biography ==
Joining the Franciscans at an early age, he devoted himself to Oriental languages and became an authority on Hebrew. Once entering Rome he was appointed by Paul V, whose confessor he was to the chair of Scripture at Ara Coeli. Calasio is known by his Concordantiae sacrorum Bibliorum hebraicorum, published in 4 vols. (Rome, 1622), two years after his death, a work which is based on Nathan's Hebrew Concordance (Venice, 1523).

== Works ==
For forty years Calasio labored on this work, and he secured the assistance of the greatest scholars of his age. The Concordance evinces great care and accuracy. All root-words are treated in alphabetical order and the whole Bible has been collated for every passage containing the word, so as to explain the original idea, which is illustrated from the cognate usages of the Aramaic, Syriac, Rabbinical Hebrew and Arabic. Calasio gives under each Hebrew word the literal Latin translation, and notes any existing differences from the Vulgate and Septuagint readings. An incomplete English translation of the work was published in London by Romaine in 1747. Calasio also wrote a Hebrew grammar, Canones generales linguae sanctatae (Rome, 1616), and the Dictionarium hebraicum (Rome, 1617).
