= William Bromley Cadogan =

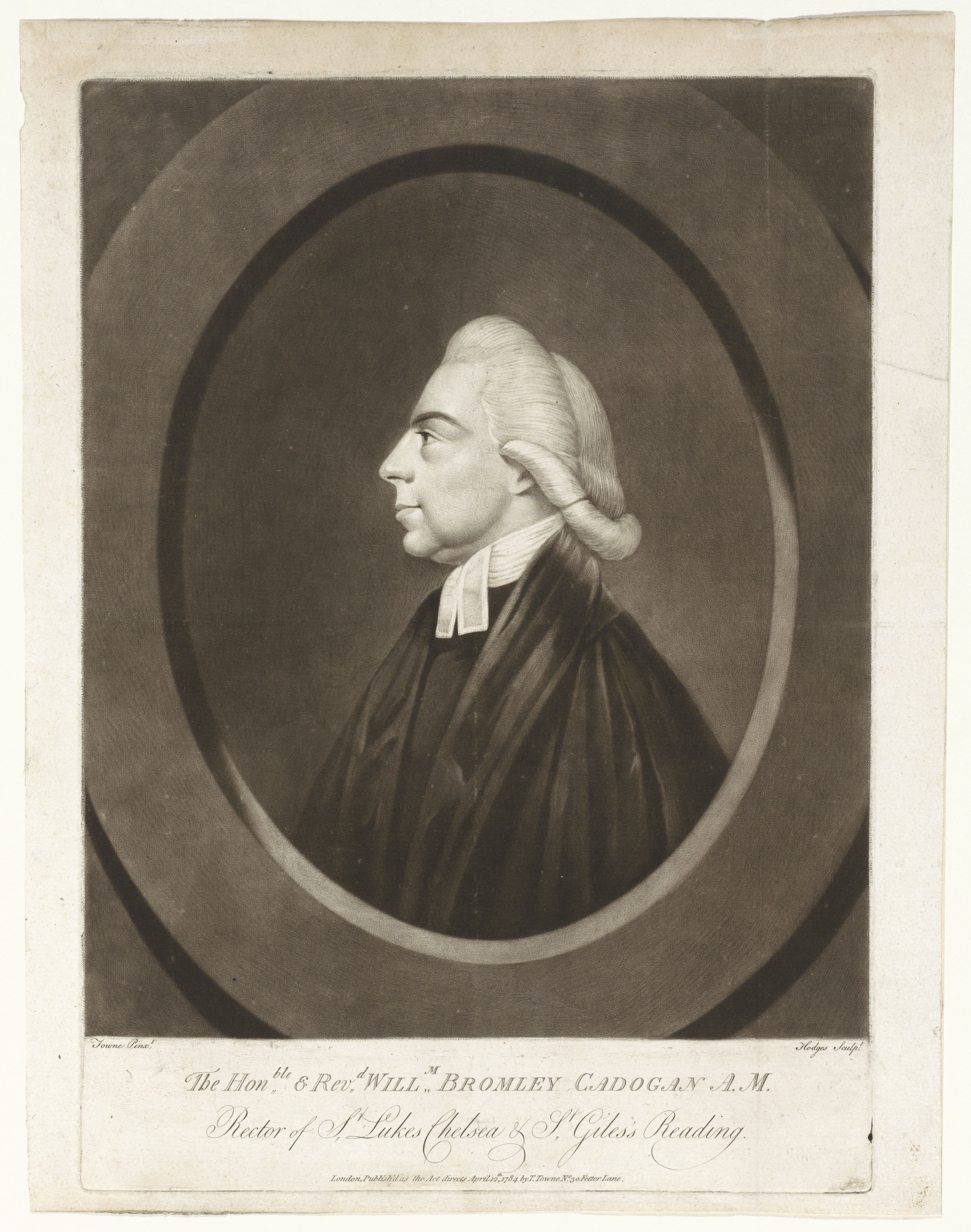
William Bromley Cadogan, 1784 engraving

William Bromley Cadogan (1751–1797) was an English cleric known as a preacher and religious writer.

== Early life ==
He was the second son of Charles Cadogan and his wife Frances Bromley, daughter of Henry Bromley, 1st Baron Montfort. He was educated at Westminster School, where he was a scholar in 1763. He matriculated at Christ Church, Oxford in 1769, graduating B.A. in 1773, M.A. in 1776.

== In holy orders ==
In 1774 Cadogan was nominated vicar to St Giles' Church, Reading on the death of the Rev. William Talbot (1717–1774), by Lord Apsley as Lord Chancellor. Talbot having died in March, Cadogan was ordained deacon in May of that year, by Robert Lowth, becoming domestic chaplain to his grandfather Charles Cadogan, 2nd Baron Cadogan, and then priest in January 1785 by William Markham. His appointment to St Giles, which had been sequestered, came later that same month.

=== Hallward controversy ===
The proceedings did not have the approval of those in the Reading congregation who had hoped to see John Hallward, curate since 1773, stay on, when it became clear that Cadogan would not agree to that. There was a schism, with a group setting up a chapel in the Countess of Huntingdon's Connexion. Hallward became vicar of Shawbury in Shropshire. The background was that Hallward, born 1749, had entered Worcester College, Oxford in 1766, aged 16. In 1767, he met there Rowland Hill and then his brother Richard Hill. He was a contact for the Hills, in the furore over Methodism at St Edmund Hall, Oxford about which Richard Hill wrote a pamphlet Pietas Oxoniensis in 1768. Hallward was in the St Edmund Hall prayer group, but escaped the expulsion of six students from it. It was Richard Hill who found Hallward the living at Shawbury.

In 1776 Hill published a pamphlet Pietas Redingensis, defending Hallward's preaching. It was addressed to the Rev. William Wainhouse, at an earlier point a curate at St Giles, author of an anonymous attack on Hallward.

=== Modification of views ===
At Reading Cadogan then came under the religious influence of Sarah Talbot, William Talbot's widow, and so of William Romaine, a friend of the Talbots. Cadogan modified his hostility to John Wesley and his Arminian Methodist views; according to his biographer Robert Cecil, he combined High Church and Calvinist outlooks.

At the time in 1782 when Charles Simeon's elder brother Richard died young, their neighbour in Reading Cadogan was an influence on Charles, despite the disapproval of his father Richard and brothers.

=== Chelsea ===
Cadogan became rector of St Luke's Church, Chelsea in 1775, on the death of the Rev. Thomas Drake, appointed by his father. To hold the second living he required an M.A. degree. That was managed with a Lambeth degree.

The Chelsea congregation was initially fashionable, then less so with Cadogan's emphasis on charity schools and Sabbatarianism. In time, he largely left his Chelsea congregation to his curate Erasmus Middleton.

Cadogan's reputation as an evangelical stopped further preferment. In 1789, the Duke of Portland in a letter to William Adam of Blair Adam called Cadogan "a great Leader among the Methodists".

== Later life and death ==
At the end of his life, Cadogan played a part in the religious conversion of William Marsh. He died in Reading in 1797, aged 45.

== Works ==
Cadogan was a popular preacher. He published sermons, and a psalm and hymn book.

- The love of Christ the portion and principle of the children of God. Proved in a sermon preached in the parish church of St. Giles, in Reading, ... December the 4th, 1785. Upon the death of Mrs. Talbot (1785)
- A Funeral Sermon, Occasioned by the Death of the Rev. W. Romaine (1795)
- The Life of the Rev. William Romaine (1796)
- Discourses of the Honourable and Reverend W. B. Cadogan (1798), editor Robert Cecil

== Family ==
Cadogan married in 1782 Jane Bradshaw (died 1827). She was the daughter of Thomas Graham of Ballagan, Stirlingshire, and the widow of Captain Bradshaw, aide-de-camp to General John Vaughan.
