= John Macgowan =

Scottish Baptist minister and author

John Macgowan (26 October 1726 – 25 November 1780) was a Scottish Baptist minister and author.

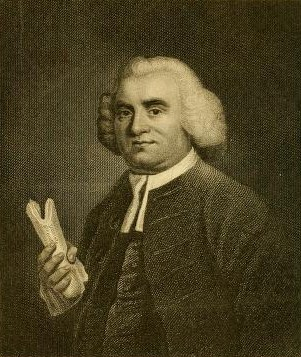
John Macgowan

== Life ==
Macgowan was born in Edinburgh, received an education, and was apprenticed to a weaver. He subsequently settled in Bridge Street, Warrington, as a baker. He had early become a Wesleyan; he now joined the Methodist movement as a preacher. At a later period he was attracted by the Independents, but finally joined the Particular Baptists. He ministered at the old baptist chapel at Hill Cliff, near Warrington, and then at Bridgnorth.

In September 1766 Macgowan became pastor of the old Baptist meeting-house in Devonshire Square, Bishopsgate, London, opened by William Kiffin in 1687. Here he remained until his death. His preaching, despite its Calvinistic tone, became popular. Macgowan's congregation were typically artisans. On its behalf he signed the petition of the Protestant Association of London, in the prelude to the Gordon Riots.

In failing health, Macgowan administered the sacrament for the last time on 12 November 1780, and died 25 November. He was buried in Bunhill Fields. He left a widow and children.

== Works ==
Macgowan was a caustic controversial writer, who used allegory in devotional works. His books went through many editions in London, the North of England, and America. Several were published under pseudonyms such as "The Shaver" and "Pasquin Shaveblock". His major work, Infernal Conferences, or Dialogues of Devils, by the Listener, London, 1772, 2 vols. may have been suggested by The Dialogues of the Dead (London, 1760) of George Lyttelton, 1st Baron Lyttelton.

Macgowan's other works included:

- Letter to an Arian, dated 28 April 1761, printed in John Allen's Crown of Crowns, 3rd edit. 1816.
- The Arians' and Socinians' Monitor, being a Vision that a young Socinian lately had, London, 1761; 3rd edit. 1795; 12th edit. 1883.
- Death: a Vision, or the Solemn Departure of Saints and Sinners, represented under the Similitude of a Dream, London, 1766; 2nd edit. 1768; 7th edit. 1780; other editions, Leeds, 1805; Edinb. 1844, &c.
- Priestcraft Defended; a Sermon occasioned by the Expulsion of Six Young Gentlemen from the University of Oxford, for praying, reading, and expounding the Scriptures; humbly dedicated to the Vice-Chancellor and the Heads of Houses, by the Shaver. This pamphlet, written in a satirical vein upon a text taken from the "St. James's Chronicle" of Thursday, 17 March 1768, relating to the expulsion of Erasmus Middleton and other "preaching tradesmen" from Oxford, ran through eleven editions in eight months. It was followed by A Further Defence of Priestcraft, being a Practical Improvement of the Shaver's Sermon on the Expulsion of Six Students, &c., occasioned by a Vindication of that pious act, by a Member of the University, 5th edit. 1768. This was answered by The Shaver Shaved by a Matriculated Barber, London, 1769. The Shaver's New Sermon for the Fast Day, by Pasquin Shaveblock, 5th edit. 1795, appears to be by Macgowan, although the preface to this edition is dated "Barbers' Hall, 17 Feb. 1795", five years after his death.
- Familiar Epistles to the Rev. Dr. Priestley, by the Author of "The Shaver's Sermon", London, 1771.
- The Life of Joseph, the Son of Israel, in eight books, London, 1771; in ten books, with a frontispiece, dedicated to the Rev. Dr. Honywood, 1799. This has been frequently reprinted, and was translated into Gaelic by Patrick Macfarlane, Glasgow, 1831.
- Socinianism brought to the Test, &c., in a series of Twenty Letters to Dr. Priestley. An answer to A Free Address to Protestant Dissenters (1768), London, 1773.
- A curious Letter to the Rev. S. B. Blacket, occasioned by his Sermon preached before the Bishop of Exeter at the Consecration of St. Aubin's Church, Plymouth.’
- The Foundry Budget opened, or the Arcanum of Wesleyanism disclosed, a reply to Walter Sellon's Defence of God's Sovereignty against the Aspersions cast upon it, by Elisha Coles, London, 1780; another edition Manchester. This work relates to the Calvinist controversy within Methodism, the title referring to the Windmill Hill Foundry, a Wesleyan headquarters. It has been called "flippant and abusive".
- Discourses on the Book of Ruth, and other Important Subjects, edited and prefaced by the Rev. J. Reynolds, 1781.

A collected edition, consisting of Infernal Conferences and four other of Macgowan's works, with portrait and illustrations, was published soon after his death, London, no date. Another, containing nine of the above, was published in 2 vols. London, 1825. Church and King, a thanksgiving sermon for 29 May, by Pasquin Shaveblock, London, 1795, although attributed to Macgowan, seems unlikely to be his.

Macgowan also edited, with notes, Night, a Satire upon the Manners of the Rich and Great, by Charles Churchill, probably about 1768.

== Notes ==
Attribution

This article incorporates text from a publication now in the public domain: Lee, Sidney, ed. (1893). "Macgowan, John". Dictionary of National Biography. Vol. 35. London: Smith, Elder & Co.
