= William Turnbull (physician) =

Scottish physician

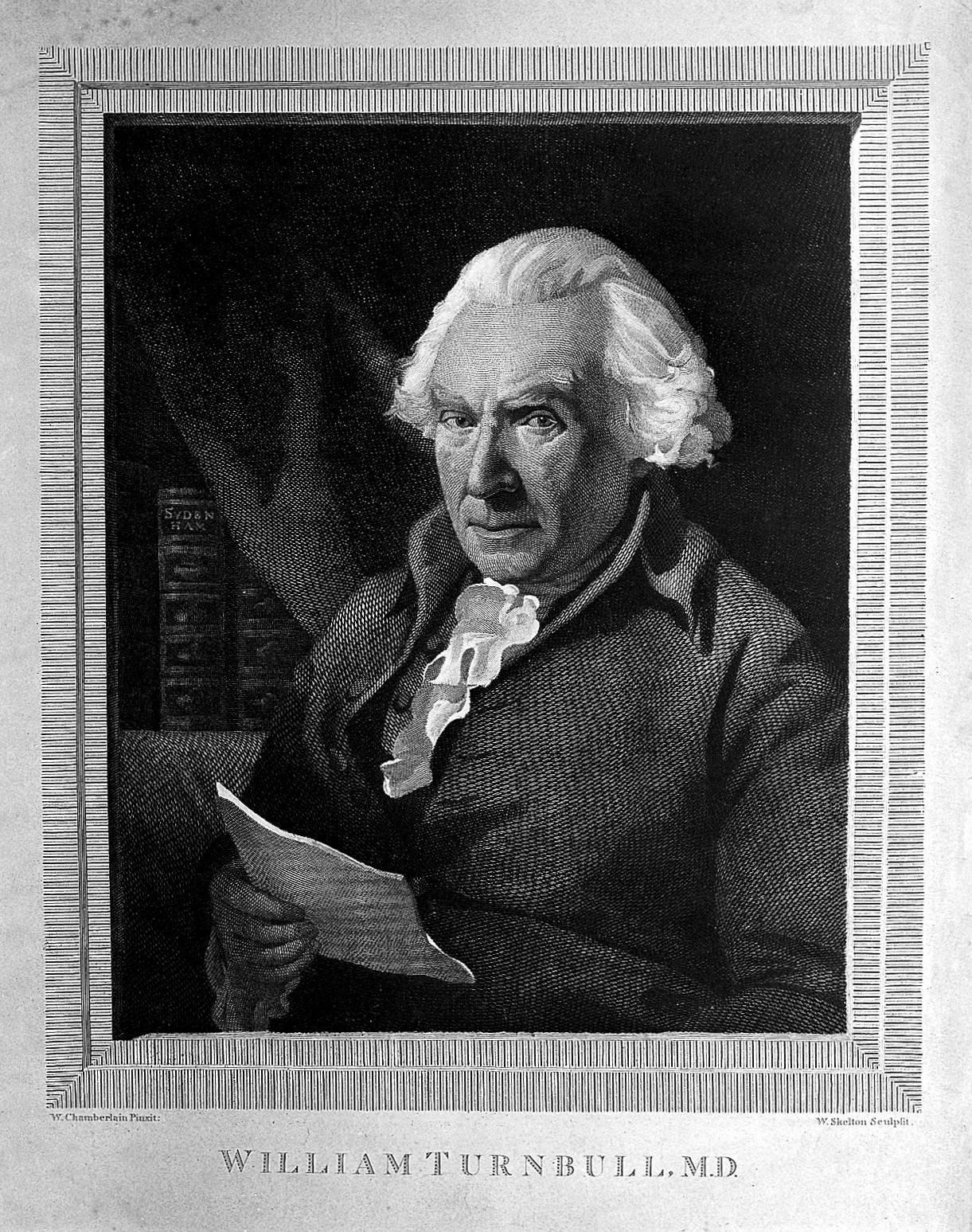
- Born: 1729? Hawick
- Died: 2 May 1796
- Occupation: Physician

William Turnbull (1729? – 2 May 1796) was a Scottish physician.

== Biography ==
Turnbull was born at Hawick about 1729. He belonged to the family of Turnbull of Bedrule in Roxburghshire. He was educated at the Hawick town school and at the university of Edinburgh, and, afterwards studied at Glasgow. About 1757 he settled at Wooler in Northumberland, and while there was chosen physician of the Bamborough infirmary. By the advice of Sir John Pringle he went to London in 1777, and shortly after was appointed physician to the eastern dispensary. He died in London on 2 May 1796. He was the author of several medical treatises of little importance. A collective edition of his ‘Works,’ with a memoir by his son, William Turnbull, was published in 1805, 12mo. Turnbull contributed the ‘medicinal, chemical, and anatomical’ articles to the ‘New and Complete Dictionary of Arts and Sciences’ (London, 1778, fol.).
