= William Romaine =

Anglican priest and writer (1714–1795)

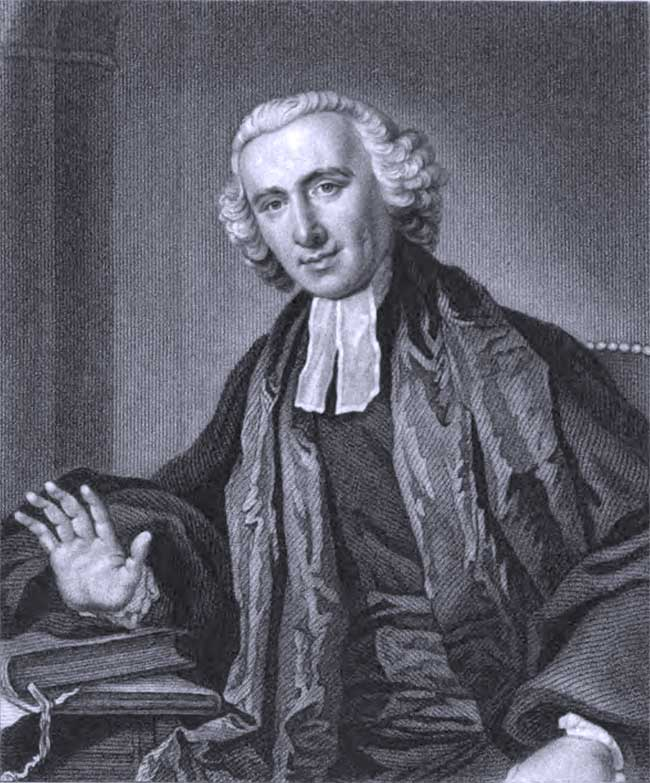
William Romaine

William Romaine (1714 at Hartlepool – 1795), evangelical divine of the Church of England, was author of works once highly thought of by the evangelicals, the trilogy The Life, the Walk, and the Triumph of Faith.

== Early life ==
Romaine was born at Hartlepool, County Durham, on 25 September 1714 the son of a corn merchant of French Protestant descent. He was educated at Houghton-le-Spring Royal Kepier Grammar School and Christ Church, Oxford.

== Ministry ==
Romaine was ordained as a deacon in 1736, and became curate of Loe Trenchard in Devon. He was ordained as a priest in December 1738, following which he became curate of Banstead in Surrey and Horton in Middlesex, holding both posts concurrently.

In 1739 he became engaged in a bitter controversy over the views of William Warburton. In 1741 he was appointed chaplain to the Lord Mayor of London, Daniel Lambert, who had his country house at Banstead, a post which gave him the opportunity to preach in St Paul's Cathedral. In 1748 he became a lecturer at St George Botolph Lane in the City of London, and the next year was appointed, in addition, to two lectureships at St Dunstan-in-the-West in Fleet Street.

It was in about 1748 he underwent an evangelical conversion. He used his positions as lecturer to preach evangelical doctrine to large crowds despite the opposition of the church hierarchy. In 1750 was afforded a further opportunity to evangelise when he was appointed assistant morning preacher at the fashionable church of St George's, Hanover Square in the West End of London. In 1751 he also accepted for a short time the professorship of Gresham Professor of Astronomy at Gresham College, His biographer William Bromley Cadogan wrote that in this role, Romaine "attempted to prove, that God was best acquainted with his own works, and had given the best account of them in his own words".

From 1756, while retaining his position at St Dunstan's, Romaine was a curate and morning preacher at St Olave's in Southwark. He also acted as a travelling preacher, going as far afield as Yorkshire and the West Country, and served as one of the Countess of Huntingdon's chaplains. In 1766, following a long dispute over his election, he became Rector of St Andrew by the Wardrobe.

Romaine was a notable Hebrew scholar, and published a four volume revision of Mario di Calasio's Hebrew dictionary and concordance between 1747 and 1749.

He died on 26 July 1795 and was buried in the church of St Andrew-by-the-Wardrobe.

== Works ==
- Treatises Upon the Life, Walk and Triumph of Faith
- The Self-existence of Jesus Christ
- Living by Faith in Christ
- The Gospel
- The Legal Spirit slain
- At War and Yet At Peace
- Thy Walk with God
- Prayer
- Walk in Obedience to God
- Essay on Psalmody (1775)

== See also ==
- Gresham Professor of Astronomy

== Sources ==
- Cadogan, William Bromley (1796). The Life of the Rev. William Romaine, M.A. London: T.Bensley.
- Malcolm, James Peller (1803). Londinium Redivivium, or, an Ancient History and Modern Description of London. Vol. 2. London.
