= Nine Martyrs of England and Wales =

Hugh Faringdon and companiones

Blessed Hugh Faringdon and Eight Companion Martyrs
- Died: 9 July 1539 (Adrian Fortescue (martyr); 14 November 1539 (Hugh Faringdon, John Rugg and John Eynon); 15 December 1539 (Richard Whiting (Abbot), John Thorne and Roger James; 1 December 1539 (John Beche; 22 August 1572 (Thomas Percy, 7th Earl of Northumberland) Places of death: Fortescue: Tower Hill; Faringdon & companions: Outside Reading Abbey; Whiting & companions: Glastonbury Tor; Beche: probably Greenstead; Percy: York
- Venerated in: Roman Catholic Church
- Beatified: 13 May 1895, by Pope Leo XIII
- Feast: 4 May (all English Martyrs); 9 July (Fortescue); 14 November (Faringdon & companions); 15 November (Whiting & companions); 1 December (Beche); 22 August (Percy)
- Attributes: martyr's palm

Nine Martyrs of England and Wales, also known as Hugh Faringdon and Eight Companion Martyrs are a group of clergy and laypersons who were executed on charges of treason and related offences in the Kingdom of England. Eight of these occurred in 1539, during the reign of King Henry VIII, and one other in 1572. They are considered martyrs in the Roman Catholic Church and were beatified on 13 May 1895 by Pope Leo XIII.

== List of individual names ==
They were chosen from a number of priests and laymen executed between 1539 and 1572, during the English Reformation. Their names were:

- John Beche
- John Eynon
- Hugh Faringdon (or Cook)
- Adrian Fortescue
- Roger James
- Thomas Percy, Earl of Northumberland
- John Rugg (or Rugge)
- John Thorne
- Richard Whiting

== Liturgical Feast Day ==
In England these martyrs, together with those beatified between 1886 and 1929, are commemorated by a feast day on 4 May. This day also honours the Forty Martyrs of England and Wales who hold the rank of saint; the Forty Martyrs were honoured separately on 25 October until the liturgical calendar for England was revised in the year 2000.

== See also ==
- List of Catholic martyrs of the English Reformation
