= Dervorguilla of Galloway =

Scottish noblewoman

- Statue of Dervorguilla of Galloway in Oxford by Alex Wenham, 2025
- Born: c. 1210
- Died: 28 January 1290
- Spouse: John I de Balliol
- Issue: Hugh de Balliol; Alan de Balliol; Alexander de Balliol; John Balliol; Cecily de Balliol; Ada de Balliol; William de Balliol; Margaret de Balliol; Eleanor de Balliol; Maud de Balliol
- Father: Alan of Galloway
- Mother: Margaret of Huntingdon

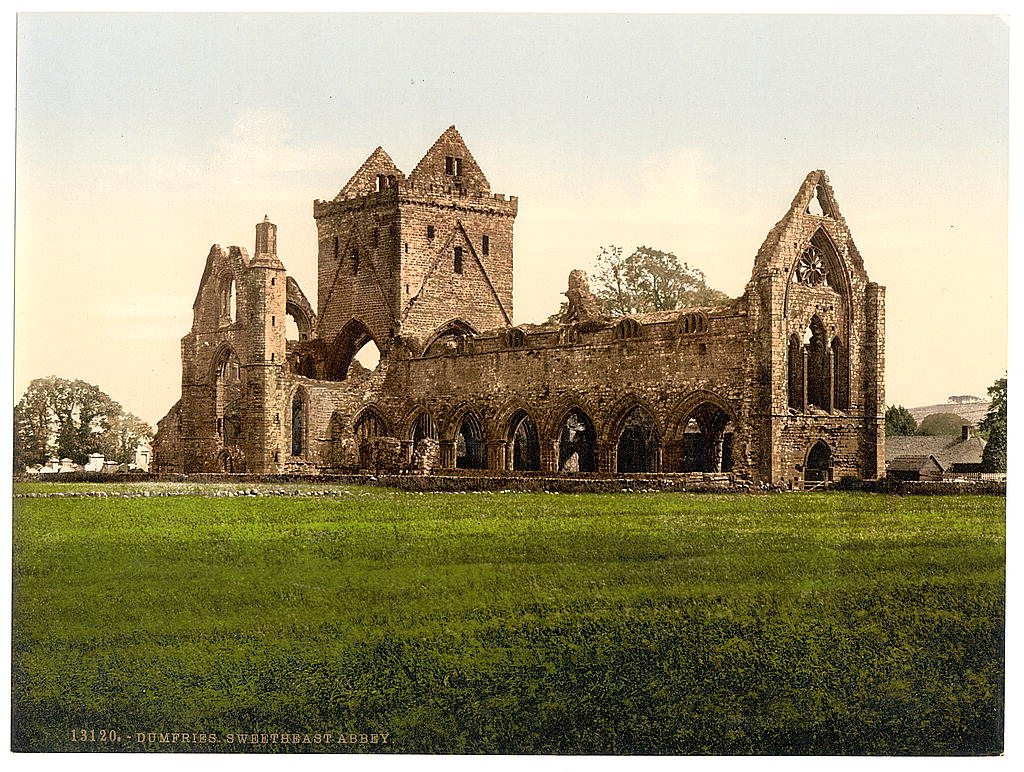
Sweetheart Abbey, Galloway

Dervorguilla of Galloway (c. 1210 – 28 January 1290) was a "lady of substance" in 13th-century Scotland. She was the wife, from 1223, of John de Balliol and the mother of King John Balliol.

== Family ==
Dervorguilla was one of the three daughters and heiresses of the Gaelic prince Alan, Lord of Galloway. Her name is a Latinisation of the Gaelic Dearbhfhorghaill. She was born to Alan's second wife Margaret of Huntingdon, who was the eldest daughter of David, Earl of Huntingdon, and Matilda (or Maud) of Chester. David, in turn, was the youngest brother of two kings of Scotland, Malcolm IV and William the Lion. Thus, through her mother, Dervorguilla was descended from the kings of Scotland, including David I.

Dervorguilla's father died in 1234 without a legitimate son (he had an illegitimate son Thomas). According to both Anglo-Norman feudal laws and ancient Gaelic customs, Dervorguilla was one of his heiresses, her two sisters Helen and Christina being elder and therefore senior. Because of this, Dervorguilla bequeathed lands in Galloway to her descendants, the Balliol and the Comyns.

== Life ==
The Balliol family, into which Dervorguilla married, was based at Barnard Castle in County Durham, England. Although the date of her birth is uncertain, her apparent age of 13 was by no means unusually early for betrothal and marriage at the time.

In 1263, her husband Sir John was required to make penance after a land dispute with Walter of Kirkham, Bishop of Durham. Part of this took the very expensive form of founding a college for the poor at the University of Oxford. Sir John's own finances were less substantial than those of his wife, however, and long after his death it fell to Dervorguilla to confirm the foundation, with the blessing of the same bishop as well as the university hierarchy. She established a permanent endowment for the college in 1282, as well as its first formal statutes. The college still retains the name Balliol College, where the history students' society is called the Dervorguilla Society and an annual seminar series featuring women in academia is called the Dervorguilla Seminar Series. While a requiem mass in Latin was sung at Balliol for the 700th anniversary of her death, it is believed that this was sung as a one-off, rather than having been marked in previous centuries.

Dervorguilla founded a Cistercian abbey seven miles south of Dumfries in April 1273. It still stands as a picturesque ruin of red sandstone. It is claimed that she was also responsible for the establishment of the first library in Dundee.

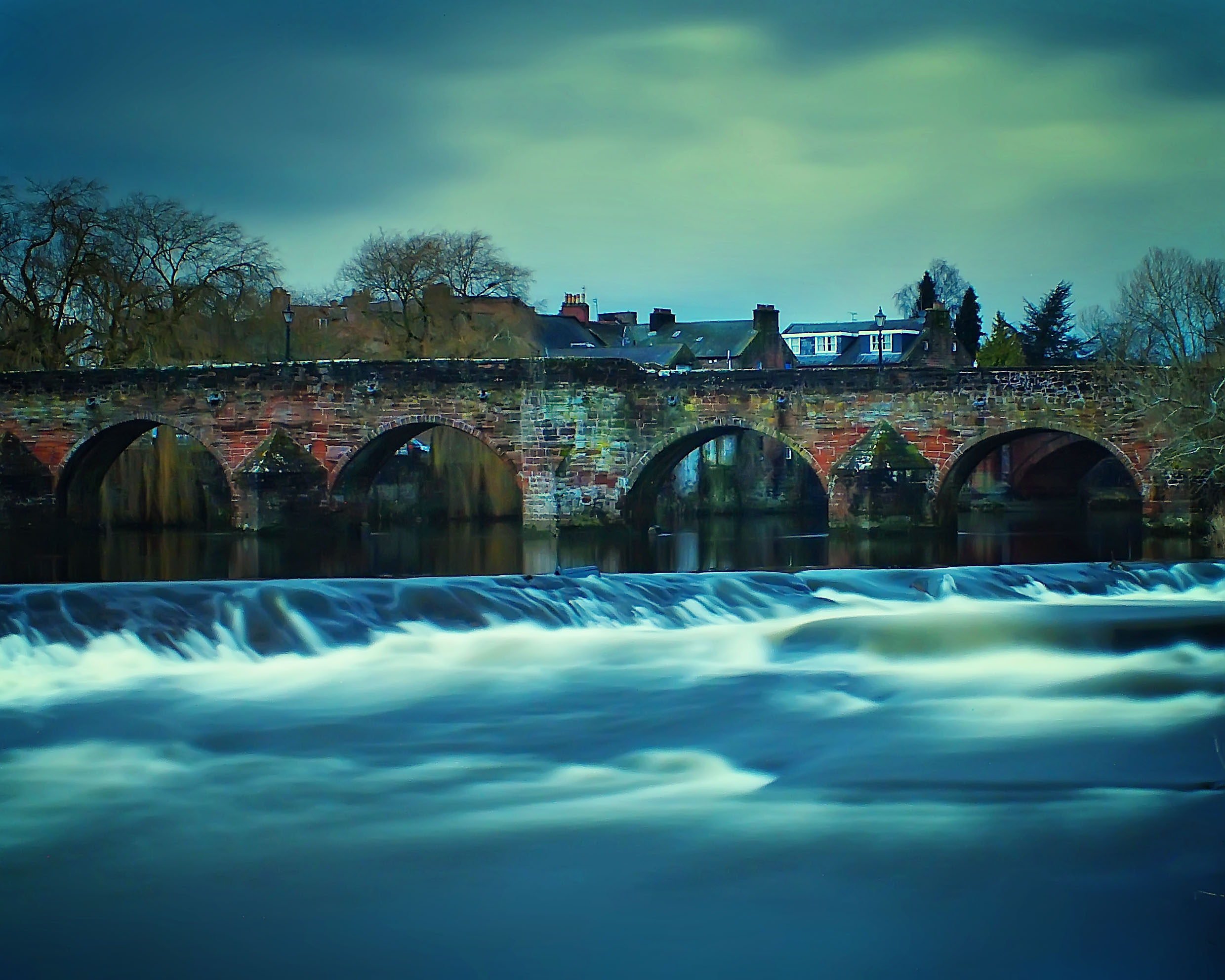
Devorguilla Bridge, Dumfries

When Sir John died in 1269, Dervorguilla had his heart embalmed and kept in a casket of ivory bound with silver. The casket travelled with her for the rest of her life. In 1274–75, John de Folkesworth arraigned an assize of novel disseisin against Dervorguilla and others touching a tenement in Stibbington, Northamptonshire. In 1275–76, Robert de Ferrers arraigned an assize of mort d'ancestor against her touching a messuage in Repton, Derbyshire. In 1280, Sir John de Balliol's executors, including Dervorguilla, sued Alan Fitz Count regarding a debt of £100 claimed by the executors from Alan. In 1280, she was granted letters of attorney to Thomas de Hunsingore and another in England, while staying in Galloway. In the same year, Dervorguilla, Margaret de Ferrers, Countess of Derby, Ellen, widow of Alan la Zouche, and Alexander Comyn, Earl of Buchan, and Elizabeth his wife sued Roger de Clifford and Isabel his wife and Roger de Leybourne and Idoine his wife regarding the manors of Wyntone, King’s Meaburn, Appleby, and Brough-under-Stainmore, and a moiety of the manor of Kirkby Stephen, all in Westmorland. Also in that year, Dervorguilla sued John de Veer for a debt of £24. In 1280–81 Laurence Duket arraigned an assize of novel disseisin against Dervorguilla and others touching a hedge destroyed in Cotingham, Middlesex. In 1288, she reached an agreement with John, Abbot of Ramsey, regarding a fishery in Ellington.

In her last years, the main line of the Royal House of Scotland was threatened by a lack of male heirs, and Dervorguilla, who died eight months before the young heiress Margaret, the Maid of Norway, might, if she had outlived her, have been one of the claimants to her throne. Dervorguilla was buried beside her husband at New Abbey, which was christened "Sweetheart Abbey", the name which it retains to this day. The depredations suffered by the abbey in subsequent periods have caused both graves to be lost. A replica is to be found in the covered south transept.

== Successors ==
Dervorguilla and John de Balliol had issue:

- Sir Hugh de Balliol, who died without issue before 10 April 1271.
- Alan de Balliol, who died without issue.
- Sir Alexander de Balliol, who died without issue before 13 November 1278.
- King John of Scotland, successful competitor for the Crown in 1292.
- Cecily de Balliol, who married John de Burgh, Knt., of Walkern, Hertfordshire.
- Ada de Balliol, who married in 1266, William de Lindsay, of Lamberton.
- William de Balliol, "Le Scott", who issued John LeScott. Some sources say it is probable he was a distant cousin of this Balliol line, not a son of John and Dervonguilla.
- Margaret (died unmarried)
- Eleanor de Balliol, who married John II Comyn, Lord of Badenoch.
- Maud, who married Sir Bryan FitzAlan, Lord FitzAlan, of Bedale, Knt., (d. 1 June 1306), who succeeded the Earl of Surrey as Guardian and Keeper of Scotland for Edward I of England.

Owing to the deaths of her elder three sons, all of whom were childless, Dervorguilla's fourth and youngest surviving son John asserted a claim to the crown in 1290 when Queen Margaret died. He won in arbitration in 1292 against the rival Robert Bruce, 5th Lord of Annandale, and subsequently was King of Scotland for four years (1292–96).

== Aunt and niece ==
She should not be confused with her father's sister, Dervorguilla of Galloway, heiress of Whissendine, who married Nicholas II de Stuteville. Her daughter Joan de Stuteville married firstly Sir Hugh Wake, Lord of Bourne, and secondly Hugh Bigod (Justiciar). Her other daughter, Margaret, married William de Mastac but died young.

== Legacy ==
In 2025, a lifesized limestone statue of Dervorguilla by Alex Wenham was erected outside Balliol College student accommodation on St Cross Road in Oxford.

== See also ==
- John Balliol (play)

== Sources ==
- This article originated with the Sweetheart Abbey guidebook, by J S Richardson HRSA, LLD, FSA Scot., published by the Ministry of Works in 1951.
- Anderson, Rev. John (ed.), Callendar of the Laing Charters A.D. 854–1837, Edinburgh, 1899, page 13, number 46, contains the Foundation Charter for Sweetheart Abbey by Devorguilla, daughter of the late Alan of Galloway, dated 10 April and confirmed by King David II on 15 May 1359, which gives relationships for this family.
- Oram, Richard D., "Devorgilla, The Balliols and Buittle" in Transactions of the Dumfriesshire and Galloway Natural History and Antiquarian Society, 1999, LXXIII. pp. 165–181.
- Huyshe, Wentworth, Dervorguilla, Lady of Galloway, 1913, has been condemned as "romantic twaddle and error" by the historians of Balliol College.
