= John Eynon =

English Benedictine and martyr

Blessed John Eynon OSB

Martyr
- Died: 15 November 1539; Reading Abbey, Berkshire, England
- Venerated in: Catholic Church
- Beatified: 13 May 1895, Rome by Pope Leo XIII
- Feast: 15 November
- Attributes: chalice, martyr's palm

John Eynon, OSB († 1539) was a monk of the Order of Saint Benedict who acted as the pastor of the parish of St Giles in Reading, England. Copies of Robert Aske's proclamation setting forth the reasons behind the Pilgrimage of Grace had circulated at Reading. Eynon was one of those who had made a copy.

At the dissolution of the monasteries under King Henry VIII, Eynon refused to surrender the parish to the King's authorities and was accused of high treason. He was executed on 15 November 1539 at the gateway to Reading Abbey, along with Hugh Faringdon and John Rugg. Rugg was a prebendary at Chichester, but had retired to live at Reading Abbey. All three men were declared to be martyrs and beatified by Pope Leo XIII in 1895.

John Eynon is commemorated by a carved wooden plaque in St Giles' Church, now a Church of England parish church, and by a stained glass window in St James' Church, the Roman Catholic parish church that occupies part of the footprint of the now ruined Reading Abbey. He is also depicted on The Martyrdom of Hugh Faringdon, last Abbot of Reading, painted by Harry Morley in 1917, and now in the collection of the Museum of Reading.
