= St Giles' Church, Reading =

St Giles' Church
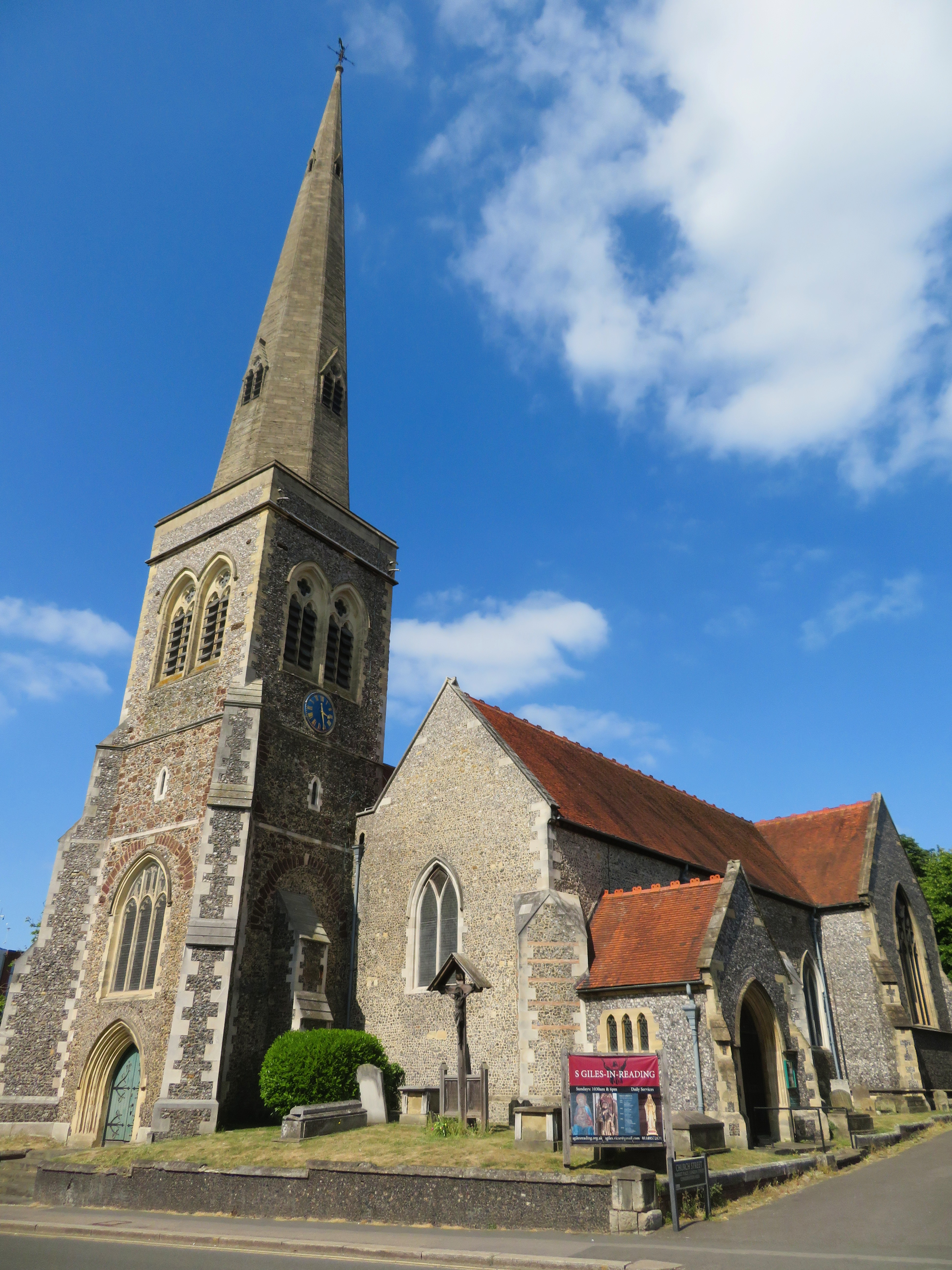
- St Giles' Church from south-west

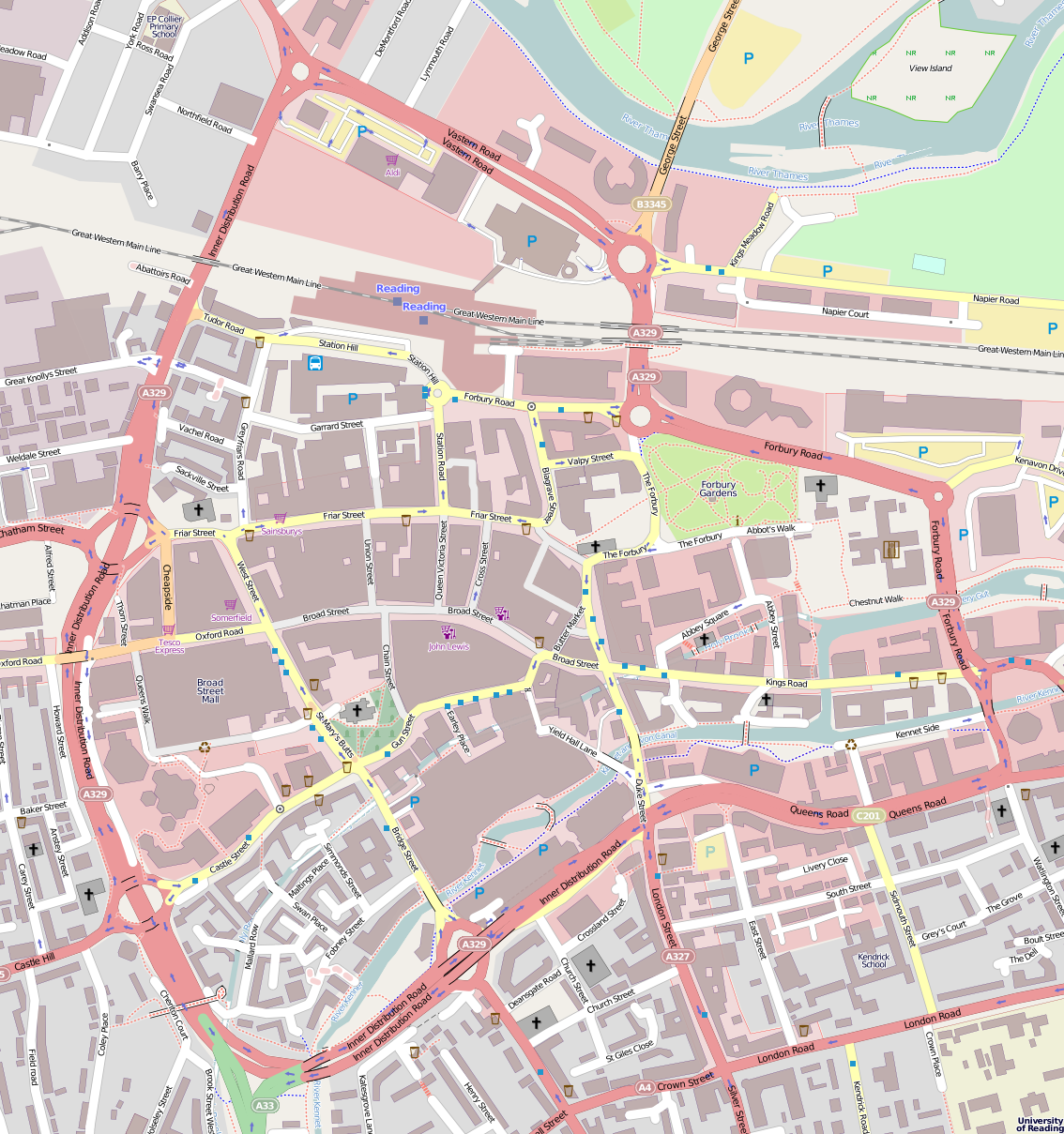
- Location within Reading Town Centre
- 51°27′3.54″N 0°58′13.45″W
- Location: Reading
- Country: England
- Denomination: Church of England
- Churchmanship: Traditional Catholic
- Website: sgilesreading.org.uk

History
- Founded: 12th century
- Dedication: St Giles

Architecture
- Functional status: Active
- Heritage designation: Grade II

Administration
- Diocese: Diocese of Oxford
- Archdeaconry: Archdeaconry of Berkshire

Clergy
- Bishop: Paul Thomas (Provincial episcopal visitor)
- Rector: David Harris

St Giles' Church is a Church of England parish church in the town of Reading in the English county of Berkshire.

== History ==
St Giles' was one of the three original parish churches, along with St Mary's and St Laurence's, serving the medieval borough of Reading. The church is on Southampton Street, just outside the town centre and in the portion of the original borough to the south of the River Kennet.

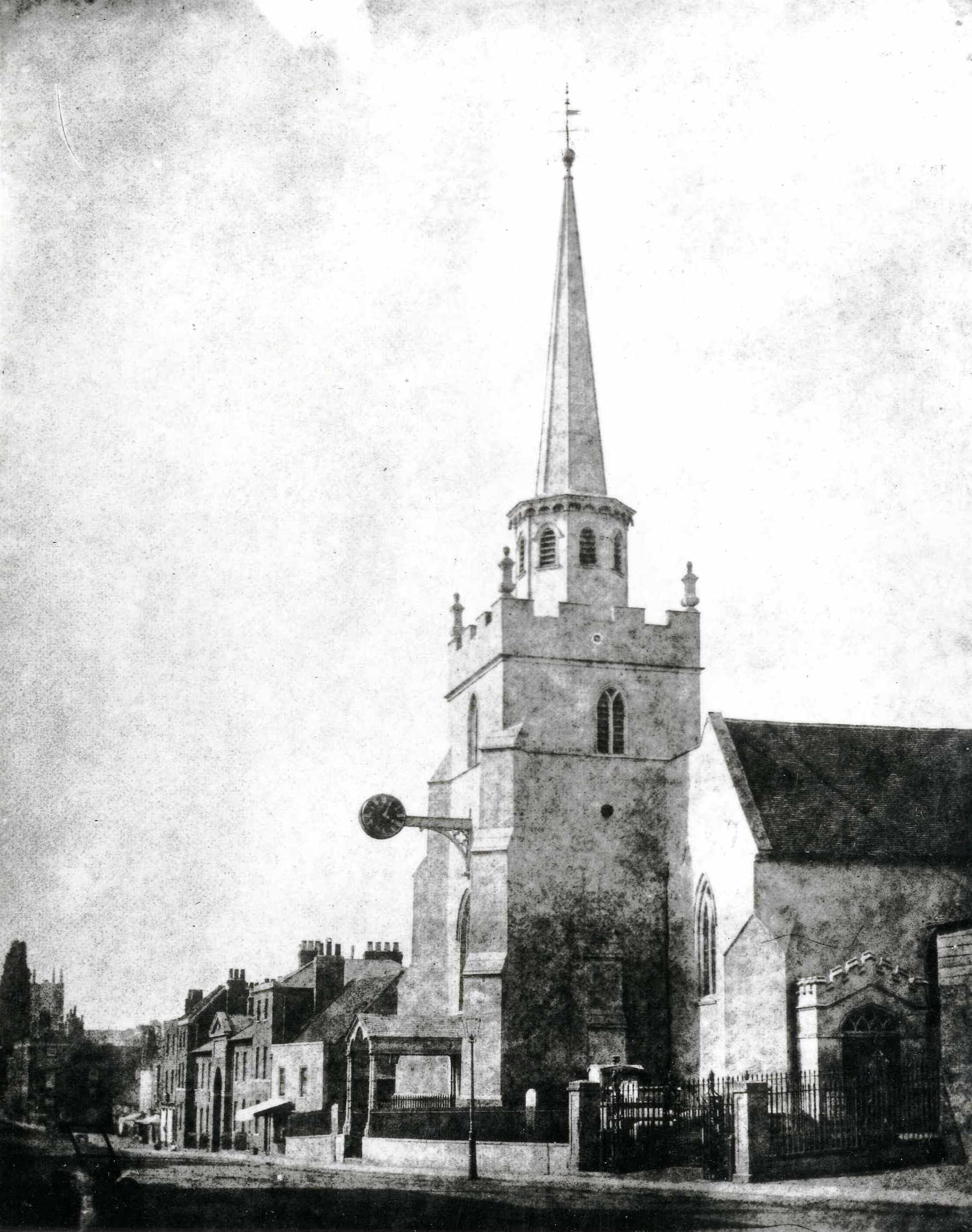
St Giles' Church, 1840-1849 by William Fox Talbot

The original church was built in the 12th century to serve the population to the south of the River Kennet, who found it difficult to reach St Mary's during winter floods of the river. Besides the southern section of the medieval borough, its parish also included the hamlet of Whitley, which then lay outside the borough boundary. In 1191 Pope Clement III gave the church to Reading Abbey and throughout the Middle Ages it enjoyed the right of sanctuary. In 1539, John Eynon, the then priest of St Giles', was found guilty of high treason and along with Hugh Cook Faringdon, the abbot of Reading Abbey, was hanged in front of the abbey gateway.

During the Civil War, when the Parliamentarian forces besieged Reading, the church tower was garrisoned by the King's forces and used as a gun platform. As a consequence it was in turn attacked by the besieging artillery and the upper part of the tower, including its spire, was destroyed in 1643. The fabric was restored at the end of hostilities.

Soldiers who died in the Battle of Reading (1688) during the Dutch invasion of England in the early part of the Glorious Revolution are buried here.

In 1798 there was a disagreement between members of the congregation of St Giles' Church. Many of them left and founded a new chapel in Castle Street, on the site of Reading's old gaol. This chapel eventually became the Church of St Mary, Castle Street.

In 1872, the original small mediaeval church was rebuilt by James Piers St Aubyn in Early English style retaining only the 13th century aisle walls and Perpendicular style west tower. A new ashlar steeple was added in 1873. The exterior of the church is faced in flint and the roof is tiled. The church is a Grade II listed building.

== Present day ==
The current Rector of St. Giles in Reading is David Harris, a Canadian.

The parish sits within the Anglo-Catholic tradition of the Church of England. As it opposes the ordination of women to the priesthood, St Giles is a member of Forward in Faith and receives alternative episcopal oversight from the Bishop of Oswestry.
