= Saints in Methodism =

Type of Christian saint

Methodism has historically followed the Protestant tradition of referring to sanctified members of the universal church as saints. However, as a title, Saint is typically prefixed to the names of biblical figures, and pre-Reformation Christians, especially martyrs of the faith. While most Methodist churches place little emphasis on the veneration of saints, they often admire, honor, and remember the saints of Christendom.

John Wesley, the founder of Methodism, believed that there was much to learn from studying renowned saints, but he discouraged the 'worship' of them. He expressed concern about the Church of England's focus on saints' days and said that "most of the holy days were at present answering no valuable end." As such, Methodism does not have any system whereby people are canonised.

== Definition ==
The title Saint in Methodist churches is commonly bestowed to those who had direct relations with Jesus Christ, or who are mentioned in the Bible. Occasionally, some esteemed, pre-Reformation Christians are accorded the title Saint—for example, the British Methodist Church addresses the British national patron saints as Saint George, Saint David, and so on. However, there is no established rule as to the use of the title. Some Methodist churches are named for historic heroes and heroines of the faith such as the Twelve Apostles (excluding Judas Iscariot), Saint Timothy, Saint Paul, Saint John the Baptist, Saint Mary Magdalene, the Virgin Mary, and Saint Joseph.

== Honoring the saints ==
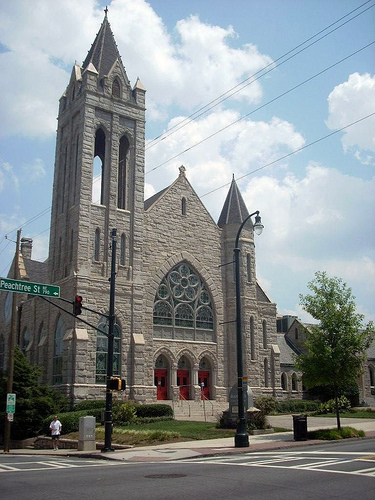
A United Methodist church dedicated to Saint Mark, in Atlanta, Georgia

John Wesley's belief was that Christianity should be Christ-centered. Article XIV of the Articles of Religion of the Methodist Church states that

The Romish doctrine concerning...worshiping, and adoration, as well of images as of relics, and also invocation of saints, is a fond thing, vainly invented, and grounded upon no warrant of Scripture, but repugnant to the Word of God.

Accordingly, Methodism formally rejects relics and prayer to saints, considering them to be distractions from the Christ-focused life and unfounded in Scripture.

While Methodists as a whole do not practice the patronage or veneration of saints, they do honor and admire them. Methodists observe All Saints' Day, following the liturgical calendar, in which the Church Universal, as well as the deceased members of a local congregation, are honored and remembered.

=== Virgin Mary ===
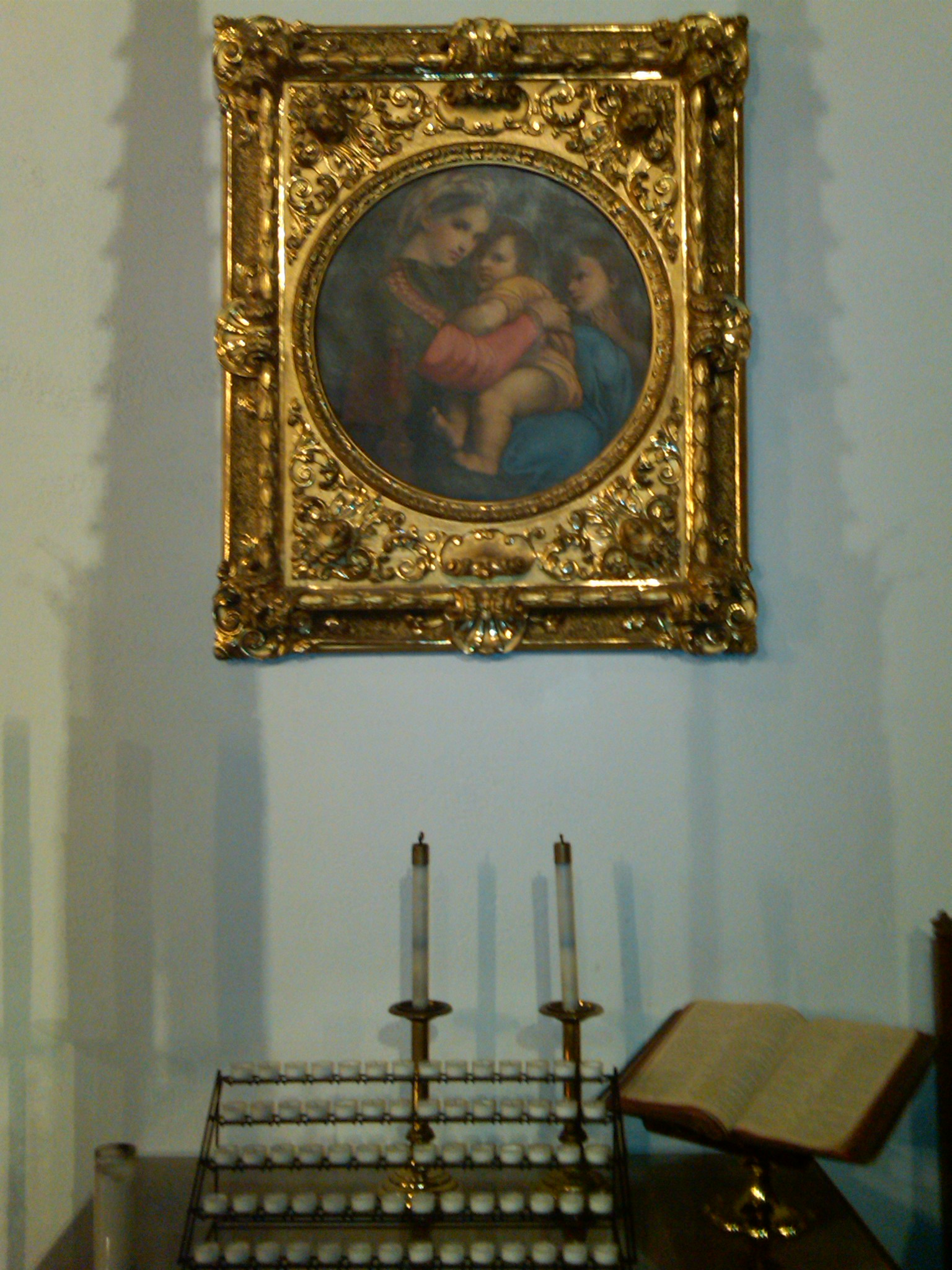
Madonna and Child with a votive candle rack and kneeler in a Methodist church. This unusual display is not at all typical of Methodist practice.

The Virgin Mary is honored as the Mother of God (Theotokos) in the United Methodist Church. Methodist churches teach the doctrine of the virgin birth, although they, like most Protestant Christians, reject the Roman Catholic doctrine of the Immaculate Conception.

Some Methodists, including John Wesley, have held that Mary was a perpetual virgin, which is the belief that Mary was ever-virgin for the whole of her life and Jesus was her only biological son. Contemporary Methodism does hold that Mary was a virgin before, during, and immediately after the birth of Christ. A small number of Methodists hold the doctrine of the Assumption of Mary as a pious opinion.

=== Martyrs of the faith ===
The title is used to refer to historical martyrs, especially dating before the Reformation. The General Conferences of the United Methodist Church voted to officially recognize Dietrich Bonhoeffer in 2008 and Martin Luther King Jr. in 2012 as modern-day 'martyrs'. The vote recognized people who died for their faith and stand as Christian role models.

== See also ==
- List of saints
- List of martyrs
- Saints in Anglicanism
