= Hugh Faringdon =

English Catholic monk and martyr

Blessed Hugh Faringdon O.S.B.
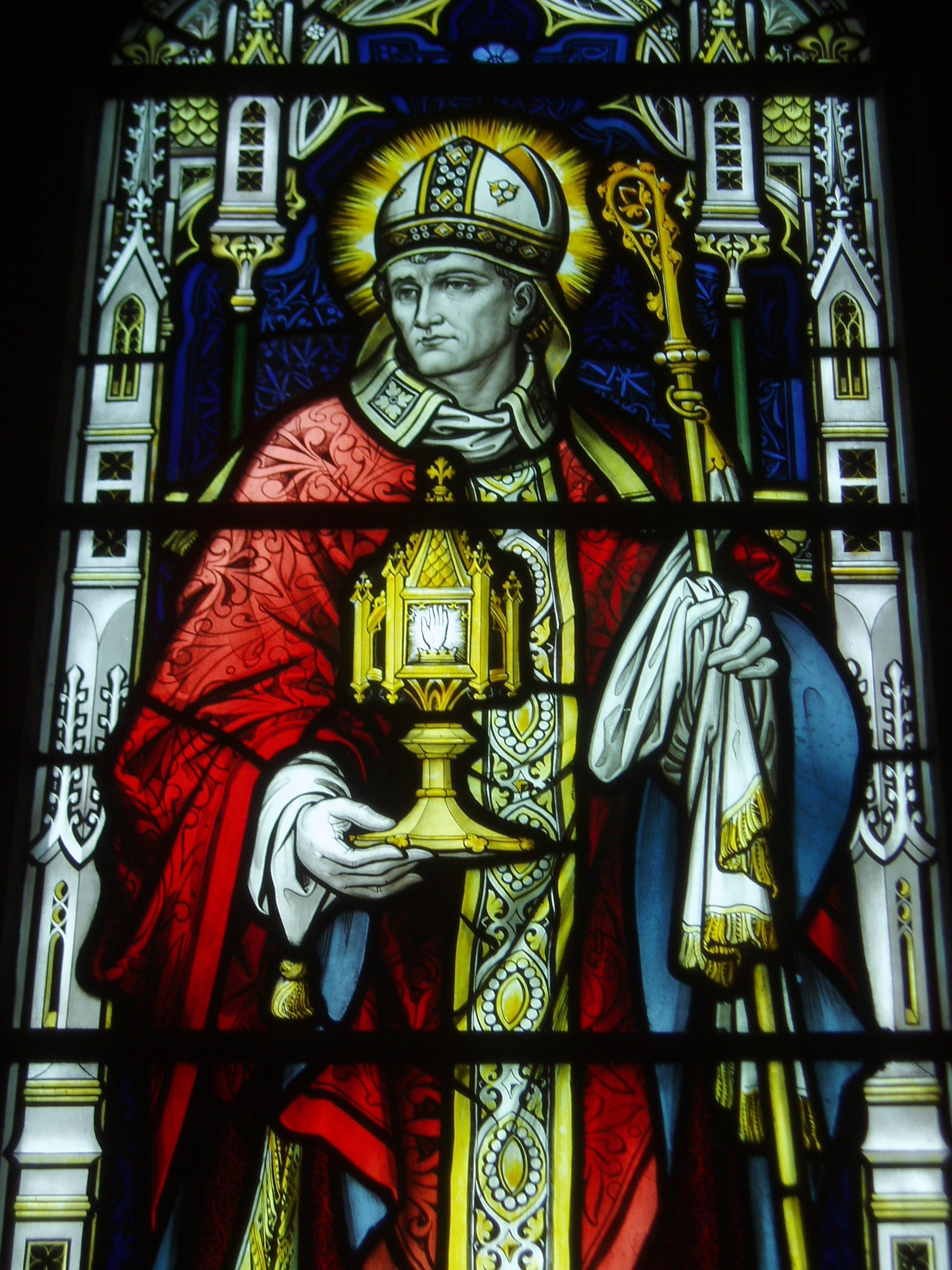
- Stained glass window at Belmont Abbey

Abbot of Reading, Martyr
- Born: c. 1490 probably Faringdon
- Died: 14 November 1539 (aged 48 - 49); Reading Abbey, Reading, England
- Honored in: Catholic Church
- Beatified: 13 May 1895 by Pope Leo XIII
- Feast: 15 November
- Attributes: reliquary, pastoral staff, martyr's palm, noose in neck

Hugh Faringdon, O.S.B. (died 14 November 1539), earlier known as Hugh Cook, later as Hugh Cook alias Faringdon and Hugh Cook of Faringdon, was an English Benedictine monk who presided as the last Abbot of Reading Abbey in the town of Reading in Berkshire, England. At the dissolution of the monasteries under King Henry VIII of England, Faringdon was accused of high treason and executed. He was declared a martyr and beatified by the Catholic Church in 1895.

== Life ==
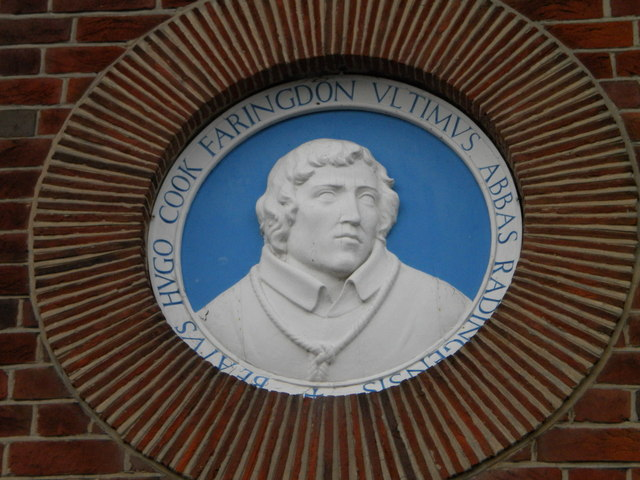
Hugh Faringdon plaque, English Martyrs Church, Liebenrood Road, Reading

Born Hugh Cook, he adopted the surname of Faringdon when he became a monk, sometime before 1500. The use of this surname suggests that he came from Faringdon, a town some 30 miles (48 km) northwest of Reading. However, it is also significant that he subsequently used the arms of the Cook family of Kent, suggesting that he had connections there. He is believed to have been educated within the abbey, and later served as the sub-cellarer of the abbey.

Hugh Faringdon was elected Abbot of Reading Abbey in 1520, upon the death of Abbot Thomas Worcester. As well as his spiritual duties, he also took up the civil duties expected at that time of a mitred abbot, being appointed as Justice of the Peace and to various governmental Commissions for Berkshire from 1526 to 1538.

At first, Faringdon's relationship with King Henry VIII of England appeared supportive. King Henry was his guest on 30 January 1521, and he later became one of the royal chaplains. Among Henry's New Year gifts in 1532 was £20 in a white leather purse to the Abbot of Reading. When the king was hunting in the neighborhood, the abbot would take the opportunity of sending him presents of Kennet trout or hunting knives.

Faringdon seems to have taken the king's side during the divorce controversy. While Henry was seeking authorities to support his views on matrimonial law, Faringdon sent him books he believed would serve that purpose. He sat in Parliament from 1523 to 1539 and, in 1530, he signed, with other members of the House of Lords, a letter to the Pope pointing out the evils likely to result from delaying the divorce desired by the King; and, again in 1536, he signed the Articles of Faith drawn up in Convocation which virtually acknowledged the supremacy of the Crown over the Church. On Sunday, 4 November 1537, he sang the requiem and dirge for Queen Jane Seymour at St. George's Chapel, Windsor, and was present at the burial on 12 November. As late as March 1538, he was in favour, being placed in the commission of the peace for Berkshire.

When the commissioners arrived to take the surrender of Reading Abbey, they reported favourably of the abbot's willingness to conform, but the surrender of the abbey does not survive, and it is not therefore known whether or not Faringdon actually signed it.

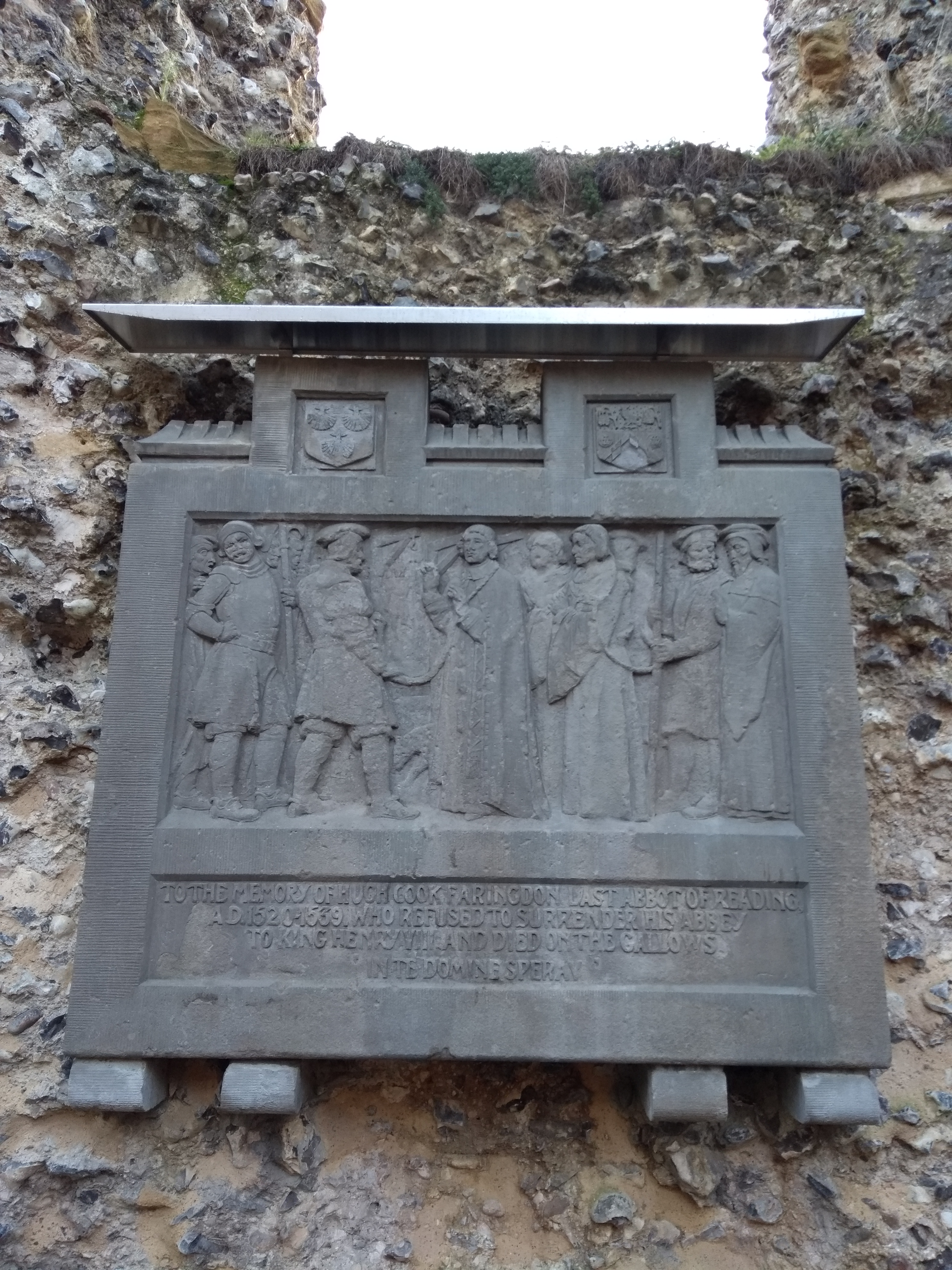
Bas-relief of execution of Hugh Faringdon, at Reading Abbey ruins.

In 1539, Faringdon was indicted for high treason after being accused of having assisted the Northern rebels with money. He was tracked down at Bere Court, his manor at Pangbourne, and taken back to the Tower of London, where he spent two months. As a mitred abbot, he was entitled to be tried by Parliament, but no scruples troubled the chancellor, Thomas Cromwell. His death sentence was therefore passed before his trial began. Along with John Rugg, a known associate, and John Eynon, the priest of St Giles' Church in Reading, he was found guilty and hanged, drawn and quartered before the inner Abbey gatehouse on 14 November 1539.

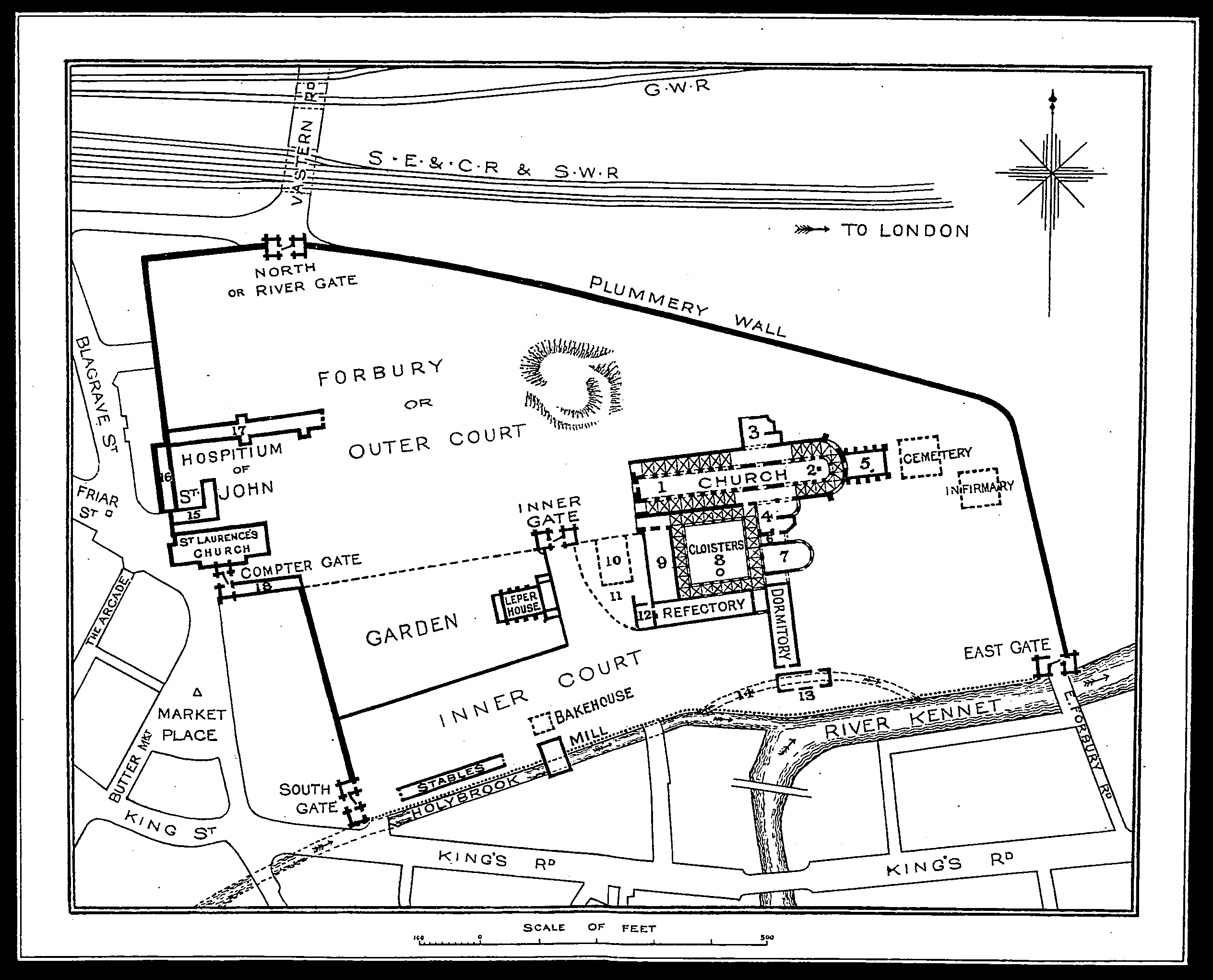
Map of Reading Abbey before its destruction. The inner court and gatehouse where Farringdon and his companions were murdered is clearly visible

John Rugg had been charged with taking and concealing one of the Abbey's celebrated relics, being the purported hand of St. Anastasius. The monks of Reading, not under suspicion of complicity in the Abbot's alleged treason, were given pensions normally set upon monks and nuns at the dissolution of their monasteries.

== Legacy ==
Hugh Faringdon was declared a martyr of the Catholic Church and beatified by the Pope Leo XIII in 1895 and his feast day is 15 November.

There are stained glass windows of Blessed Hugh in the following churches:

- St James' Church, the Roman Catholic parish church that occupies part of the footprint of the now ruined Reading Abbey. His two martyred companions are also commemorated.
- Saint Meinrad Archabbey, in Saint Meinrad, Indiana, along with beatified companions Whiting and Beche
- Belmont Abbey outside Hereford

A plaque at the English Martyrs Church in Liebenrood Road, Reading, commemorates him.

There is a panel painting of him in the Our Lady and Saint Anne Church in Caversham, Reading.

He is also depicted on The Martyrdom of Hugh Faringdon, last Abbot of Reading, painted by Harry Morley in 1917, and now in the collection of the Museum of Reading.

The Blessed Hugh Faringdon Catholic School, a specialist performing arts college in Reading, is named after him, as also the Blessed Hugh Catholic Church in Faringdon.

A stone head of Hugh Faringdon was carved by Alex Wenham for the Reading Abbey Gateway, completed in 2021 to mark the Abbey's 900th anniversary. This won a commendation in the 2022 Natural Stone Awards. The plaster cast for the work is held in the collections of Reading Museum.

== See also ==
- Richard Whiting, last Abbot of Glastonbury Abbey
- Thomas Marshall, last Abbot of St John's Abbey, Colchester

Catholic Church titles
Preceded by Thomas III	Abbot of Reading; 1520–1539	Abbey dissolved
