= Adam de Lathbury =

Adam de Lathbury, O.S.B., otherwise known as Adam of Lathbury or Adam Lothbury, was a Benedictine monk who ruled as Abbot of Reading Abbey, in the English county of Berkshire, from 1226 to 1238.

In 1233, a group of friars of the Franciscan Order arrived in Reading with the intention of creating a community to minister to the poor and the oppressed. This arrival was not welcomed by the established Reading Abbey, but the fact that the friars had royal patronage meant that Abbot Adam was obliged to assist. He granted them a site alongside the road to Caversham Bridge, but the site proved prone to flooding, and they later moved to the site now occupied by the town's Greyfriars Church.

Catholic Church titles
Preceded by Simon	Abbot of Reading; 1226-1238	Succeeded by Richard I (of Chichester)
