= Abbey Gateway, Reading =

Abbey Gateway
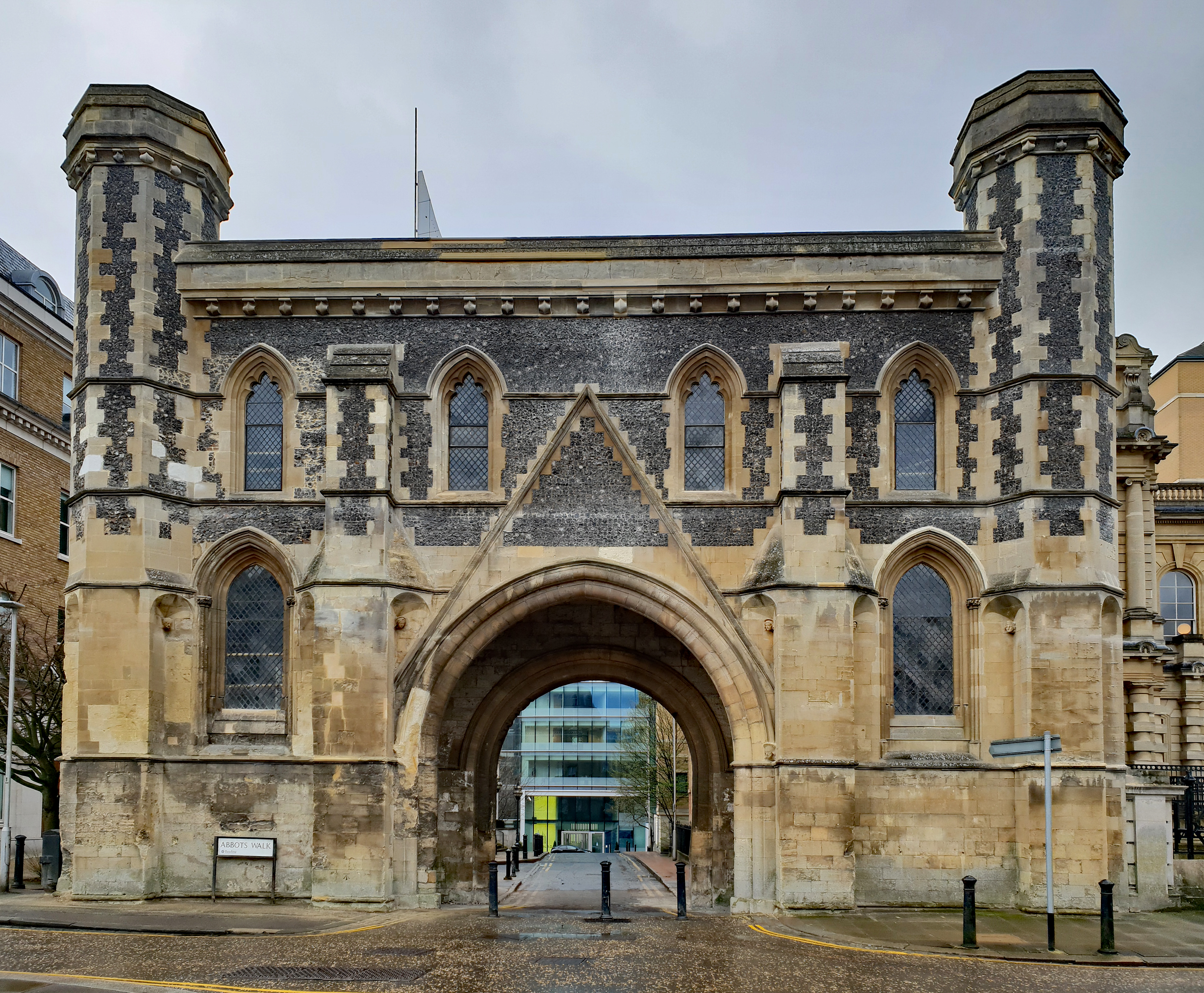
- The gateway as restored in 2018

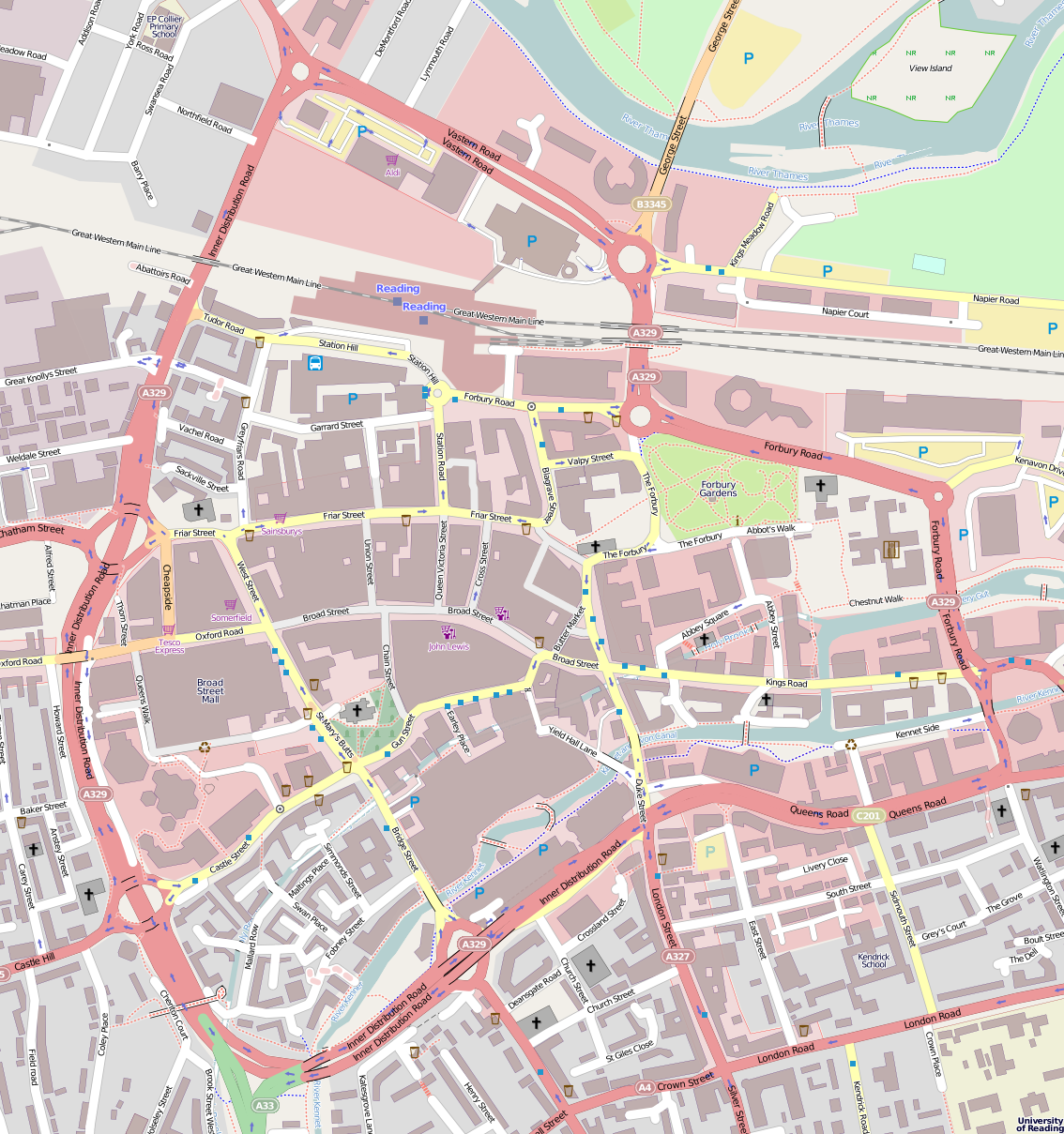
- Location within Reading Central
- 51°27′23.2″N 0°58′00.5″W
- Type: Gateway
- Location: Reading, Berkshire, UK

Site notes
- Owner: Reading Borough Council

Listed Building – Grade I
- Official name: Abbey Gate
- Designated: 22 March 1957
- Reference no.: 1155691

The Abbey Gateway was originally the inner gateway of Reading Abbey, which today is a large, mostly ruined abbey in the center of the town of Reading, in the English county of Berkshire. The gateway adjoins Reading Crown Court and Forbury Gardens and is one of only two abbey buildings that have survived intact, the other being the Hospitium of St John the Baptist. It is a grade I listed building, and includes a porter's lodge on the ground floor and a large open room above the gate.

The gateway marked the division between the area of the abbey open to the public and the section accessible only to monks, with the abbot's lodging just inside the gateway. The gateway thus became the meeting place between the abbot, who commanded considerable powers within the town, and the people of the town. In 1539, after the dissolution, Hugh Faringdon, the last abbot of Reading was hanged, drawn, and quartered outside the abbey gateway. Whilst the other buildings of the abbey were stripped for lead and stone, the abbot's lodging was turned into a royal palace on the orders of Edward Seymour, who was acting as lord protector as King Edward VI was still a child. The abbey gateway was also retained, as the entrance to the royal residence.

Edward's sister, Queen Elizabeth I, was a regular visitor to the royal palace, but during the Civil War the old abbot’s lodgings were damaged, and were not used as a royal palace again. Eventually the palace was demolished and new houses were built alongside the gateway. In the late 18th century one of them was home to the Reading Ladies’ Boarding School, attended amongst others by the novelist Jane Austen. The school used the room above the gateway as a classroom.

The gateway was heavily restored by Sir George Gilbert Scott, after a partial collapse during a storm in 1861. In 1900 a series of twelve heads, sculpted by Andrew Ohlson, were added to the gateway.

In 2010, the gateway was closed and fencing erected when some of the decorative stonework came loose and fell into the street. It reopened in 2018 after an extensive restoration, which was supported by the Heritage Lottery Fund. The room above the gateway is now used by Reading Museum as part of its learning programme for local schools, whilst the arch below is available for use by pedestrian and cycle traffic. The Reading Half Marathon, held every year in March or April, passes under the gateway at around the 7 miles (11 km) stage.

The gateway includes a stone head of the last abbot of Reading, Hugh Faringdon, carved by Alex Wenham, which received a commendation in the 2022 Natural Stone Awards. This carved head was added to commemorate the 900th anniversary of Reading Abbey in 2021.

== Gallery ==
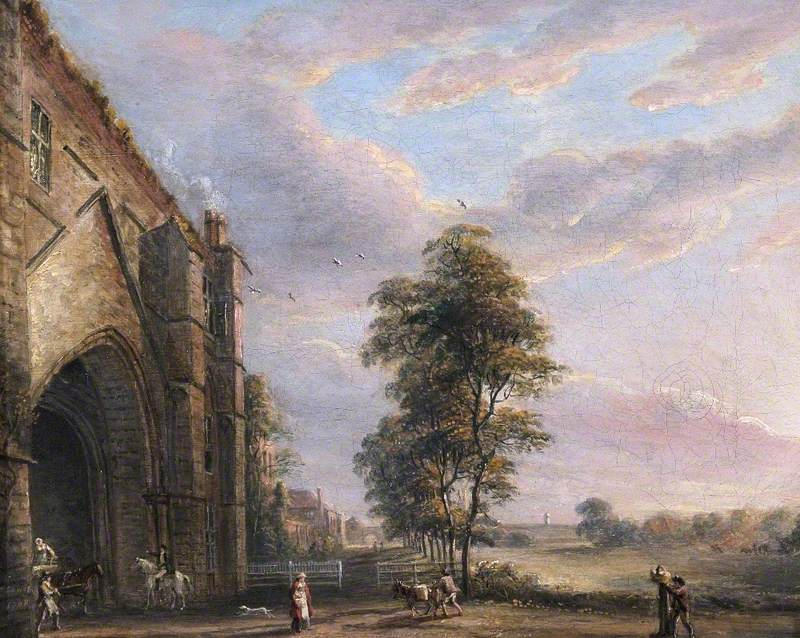
The northern side of the gateway depicted in 1808

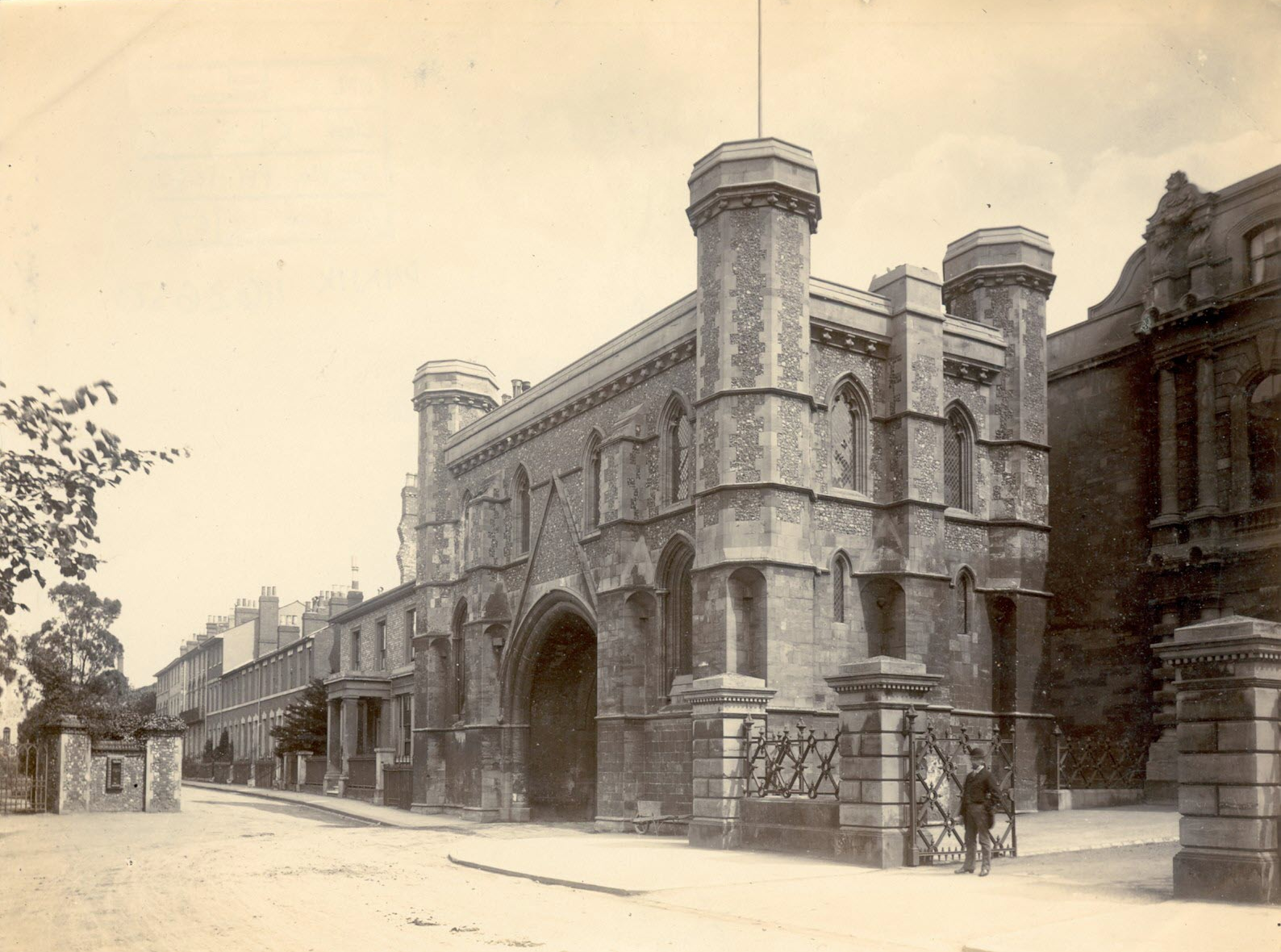
The northern side in c.1893 after Scott's restoration

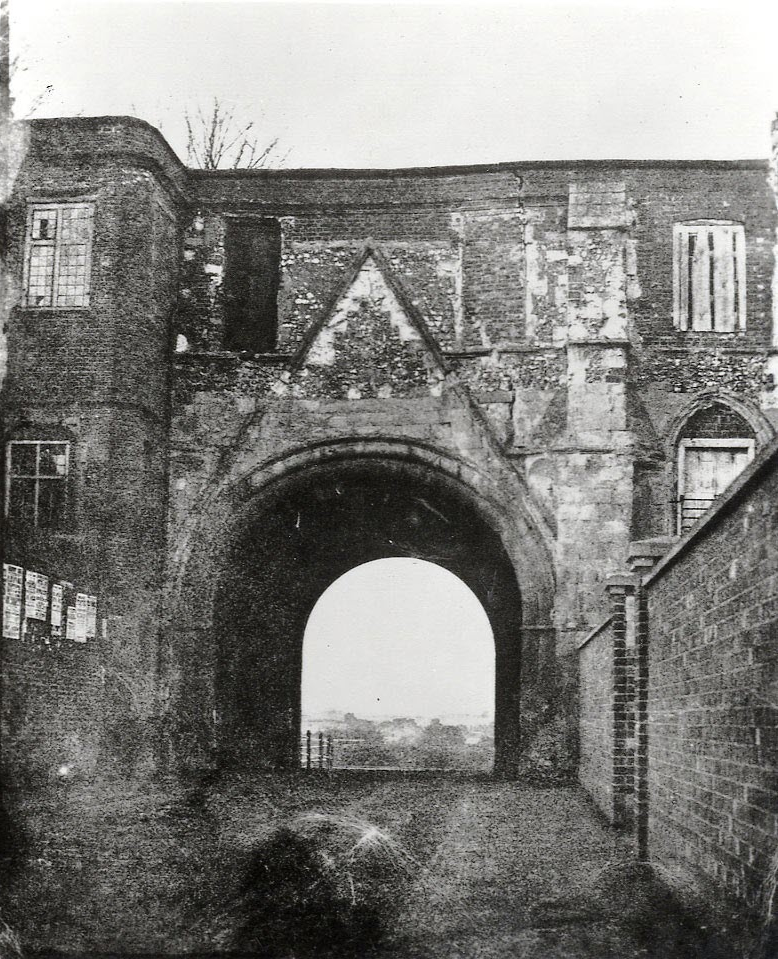
The southern side before Scott's restoration

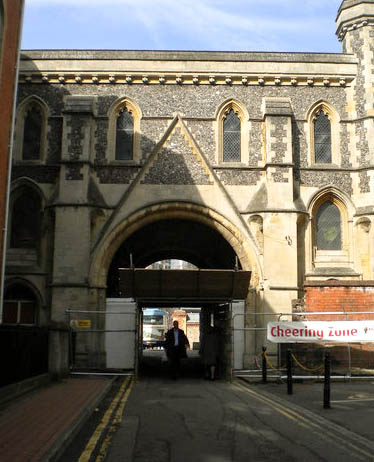
The southern side in 2010 with protective fencing
