= Statue of Dervorguilla of Galloway =

Stone statue in Oxford, England

- View of the statue
- Artist: Alex Wenham
- Completion date: 20 September 2025
- Medium: Limestone
- Subject: Dervorguilla of Galloway
- Location: Oxford; 51°45′23.11″N 1°14′54.66″W
- Owner: Balliol College, Oxford
- Commissioner: Balliol College, Oxford

The Statue of Dervorguilla of Galloway is a limestone sculpture of the mediaeval Scottish woman, Dervorguilla of Galloway (1210–1290), by the stone carver Alex Wenham, located on St Cross Road in Oxford, England.

Alex Wenham carving the statue

Dervorguilla of Galloway was the wife of John de Balliol, who founded Balliol College, Oxford. Oxford's influential women are underrepresented in the city's public art, but this sculpture recognizes the woman who did the actual work in the establishment of Balliol College.

The statue was commissioned and is owned by Balliol College. It was unveiled in the courtyard of Master's Field, new Balliol College student accommodation, with funding from the Balliol College alumnus Jim Rogers. It is located outside Balliol College buildings on St Cross Road in Oxford.

The sculpture was shortlisted for an Oxford Preservation Trust Award. and was highly commended.
