= Alex Wenham =

English stone carver

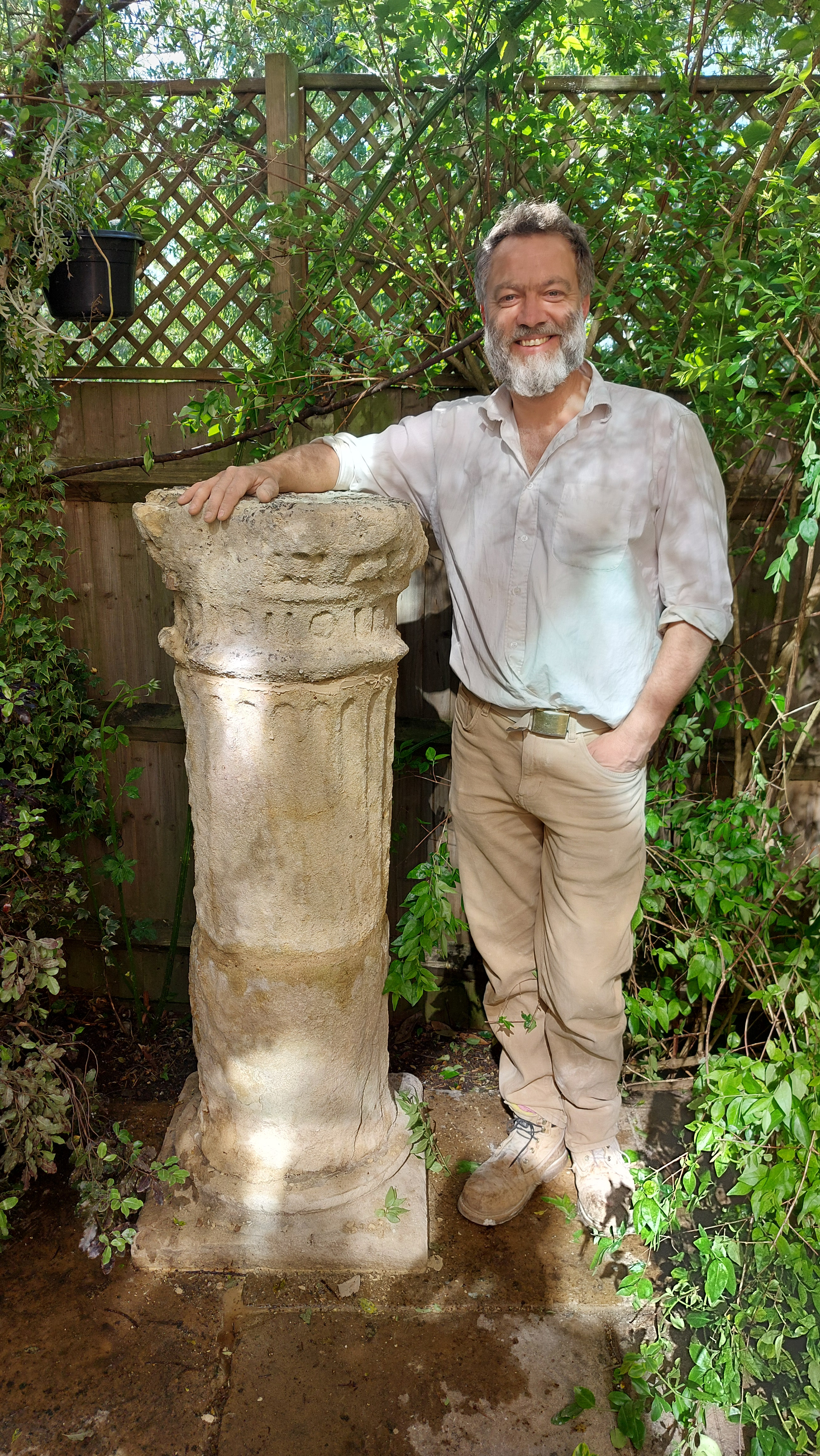
- Alex Wenham with a restored Bodleian Library stone column
- Born: Charles Alexander William Wenham; December 1977 (age 48)
- Education: Trinity College, Cambridge
- Known for: Stone carving; Statue of Dervorguilla of Galloway (2025)
- Awards: European Stone Festival 2013, 2014, 2016, 2018, 2024 Overall Festival Winner; Oxford Preservation Trust 2019 Certificate; Natural Stone Awards – Reading Abbey Gateway Hugh Faringdon Carving 2022 Commended – Stone Carver; Natural Stone Awards – Magdalen College Chapel, Oxford – West Door 2024 Commended – Main & Principal Stone Contractor; Oxford Preservation Trust Awards – Statue of Dervorguilla of Galloway 2026 Highly commended – Sculptor
- Patrons: Balliol College, Oxford; Brighton Pavillion; Chartres Cathedral; Château de Versailles; Christchurch Priory; Eton College; Hampton Court Palace; The Houses of Parliament; The Louvre; Magdalen College, Oxford; Randolph Hotel, Oxford; Reading Borough Council; St Pancras Station; St Paul's Cathedral; Wellington College
- Website: alexwenham.co.uk

Charles Alexander William Wenham (born December 1977) is an English stone carver. He specialises in architectural stone carving, letter cutting, restoration work, and statues.

Wenham, who restored the original Statue of Queen Anne at St Paul's Cathedral, inspecting the replacement statue in front of the cathedral

Wenham graduated from Trinity College, Cambridge in 2000. Initially, he worked in London and Paris, before moving to Oxford in 2015. His projects have included work for the Houses of Parliament and St Paul's Cathedral in London, Chartres Cathedral and the Louvre in France, and Balliol College, Magdalen College, and the Randolph Hotel in Oxford.

He has demonstrated stone carving during Heritage Open Days and Oxford Open Doors at the Oxford Castle & Prison. He has given lectures on his work as an architectural stone carver, working on buildings from the 11th century onwards. He also creates outdoor stone sculptures. In 2017, he volunteered to produce a sculpture to celebrate the Oxford-based detective novelist Colin Dexter.

Wenham carving the statue of Dervorguilla of Galloway

Wenham has received awards including top honours at the European Stone Festival five times (in 2013, 2014, 2016, 2018, and 2024), including as the "Overall Festival Winner". He received a certificate for his work on restoring a statue of boxers for Magdalen College from the Oxford Preservation Trust in 2019.

He was awarded a commendation in the 2022 Natural Stone Awards for his carved head of Hugh Faringdon (the last abbot of Reading) on the Reading Abbey Gateway, completed in 2021 to mark the Abbey's 900th anniversary. The plaster cast for the work is held in the collections of Reading Museum. In 2024, he was commended in the Natural Stone Awards for the restoration of the west door of the chapel at Magdalen College.

In 2025, a new lifesized statue by Wenham of Dervorguilla of Galloway (c.1210–1290), the wife of John de Balliol, was erected outside Balliol College student accommodation on St Cross Road in Oxford. It was highly commended by the Oxford Preservation Trust in its 2026 Awards. Restoration work on the Bodley and Garner Gateway at Magdalen College, by the main entrance fronting onto the High Street, was also completed.

Wenham is a member of the Diocesan Advisory Committee for the Diocese of Oxford.
