= Lists of martyrs =

This page is an index of lists of people considered martyrs. A martyr is someone who suffers persecution and death for advocating, renouncing, refusing to renounce, or refusing to advocate a belief or cause as demanded by an external party. This refusal to comply with the presented demands results in the punishment or execution of the martyr by the oppressor.

This list is sorted at the top level by religious or political affiliation of the martyrs on each list, and then by the country or location of martyrdom.

== Christian martyrs ==
- 108 Martyrs of World War II: 108 Polish Roman Catholics martyred by the Nazi Party during World War II.
- Canadian Martyrs: eight Jesuit missionaries from Sainte-Marie among the Hurons martyred during warfare between the Iroquois (particularly the Mohawk people) and the Huron.
- Elias and companions: five Christians from Roman Egypt martyred in the city of Caesarea Maritima.
- Four Crowned Martyrs: nine people venerated as martyrs and saints by the Catholic Church.
- Korean Martyrs: 8,000–10,000 Catholics were killed during the 19th century in Korea, 103 of whom have been canonized.
- List of Protestant martyrs of the Scottish Reformation: men and women executed under heresy laws during the Scottish Reformation.
- List of protomartyrs: a list of known protomartyrs; a protomartyr is the first Christian martyr in a country or among a particular group, such as a religious order.
- List of royal saints and martyrs: a list of Christian monarchs, other royalty, and nobility who have been beatified or canonized, or who are otherwise venerated as or conventionally given the appellation of "saint" or "martyr".
- List of Unitarian martyrs: a list of people considered martyrs for their adherence to the Unitarianism movement.
- Martyrs of Gorkum: 19 Dutch Catholic clerics and friars hanged by militant Dutch Calvinists during the 16th century religious wars.
- Martyrs of Nowogródek: 11 Sisters of the Holy Family of Nazareth executed by the Gestapo in 1943 in occupied Poland.
- Martyrs of Otranto: 813 residents of the city of Otranto, Italy put to death in 1480 for refusing to convert to Islam.
- Saints of the Cristero War: 25 Catholic saints and martyrs who died in the Mexican Cristero War.
- Uganda Martyrs: 23 Anglican and 22 Catholic Christians executed on the orders of Mwanga II of Buganda between 1885 and 1887.
- Vietnamese Martyrs: according to the Catholic Church, an estimated 130,000–300,000 Catholics were persecuted in Vietnam between 1745 and 1862.

=== Martyrs of China ===
- China Martyrs of 1900: at least 189 Protestant missionaries and 500 Chinese Protestants who were killed during the Boxer Rebellion.
- Martyr Saints of China: 87 Chinese Catholics and 33 Western missionaries martyred from the mid-17th century to 1930.
- Holy Martyrs of China: 222 Chinese Orthodox Christians martyred on 11 June 1900 during the Boxer Rebellion.

=== Martyrs of England ===
- Catholic martyrs of the English Reformation: men and women executed under treason legislation in the English Reformation, between 1534 and 1680, and recognised as martyrs by the Catholic Church.
- Colchester Martyrs: 28 Protestants executed for heresy in Colchester, Essex, between 1545 and 1558.
- Eighty-five martyrs of England and Wales: 85 men executed as part of the Protestant purge and beatified by Pope John Paul II.
- Forty Martyrs of England and Wales: 40 Catholic men and women executed for treason and related offences between 1535 and 1679.
- Ipswich Martyrs: 9 people burnt at the stake for Lollard or Protestant beliefs around 1515–1558.
- Nine Martyrs of England and Wales: clergy and laypersons executed on charges of treason in 1539 and 1572
- One Hundred and Seven Martyrs of England and Wales: clergy and laypersons executed on charges of treason between 1541 and 1680
- Protestant martyrs of the English Reformation: men and women executed under heresy laws during the English Reformation, between 1509 and 1925.
- Stratford Martyrs: 13 people burnt at the stake for Protestant beliefs in 1556.
- Windsor Martyrs: 3 English Protestants martyred at Windsor in 1543.

=== Martyrs of Japan ===
- 16 Martyrs of Japan: 16 Christians who were persecuted for their faith in Japan, mostly during the 17th century.
- 26 Martyrs of Japan: 26 Roman Catholics who were executed by crucifixion at Nagasaki in 1597.
- 205 Martyrs of Japan: 205 Christian missionaries and followers who were persecuted and executed for their faith in Japan, mostly during the Tokugawa shogunate period in the 17th century.

=== Martyrs of the Roman Empire ===
- 20,000 Martyrs of Nicomedia: A name for the victims of persecution of Christians in Nicomedia, Bithynia (modern Izmit, Turkey) by the Roman Emperors Diocletian and Maximian in the early 4th century AD.
- Agapius, Atticus, Carterius, Styriacus, Tobias, Eudoxius, Nictopolion, and Companions: soldiers who were burned at the stake at Sebaste (modern Sivas, Turkey) in 315, during the reign of Emperor Licinius.
- Behnam, Sarah, and the Forty Martyrs: 4th-century Christians who were martyred during the reign of Shapur II.
- Carpophorus, Exanthus, Cassius, Severinus, Secundus, and Licinius: tradition in Como, Italy, holds that these Christian soldiers were martyred during the reign of the Roman emperor Maximian.
- Christians martyred during the reign of Diocletian: men and women martyred during the Diocletianic Persecution.
- Denise, Dativa, Leontia, Tertius, Emilianus, Boniface, Majoricus, and Servus: 8 martyrs killed in the late 5th century during the persecution of Trinitarian Christians in Proconsular Africa.
- Donatus, Romulus, Secundian, and 86 Companions: a group of Christians who were martyred at Concordia Sagittaria (at the time called Iulia Concordia), near Venice, during the Diocletian Persecution.
- First Martyrs of the Church of Rome: Christians martyred in the city of Rome during persecution by Nero in 64 AD
- Forty Martyrs of Sebaste: a group of Roman soldiers in the Legio XII Fulminata whose martyrdom in 320 for the Christian faith is recounted in traditional martyrologies.
- Scillitan Martyrs: 12 North African Christians who were executed in Proconsular Africa on 17 July 180 AD.
- The Seven Brothers of Lazia: 7 Roman soldiers executed during the persecutions of co-emperor Maximian.
- Seven Robbers: A group of robbers from the Greek island of Corfu who were converted in prison and then executed in the 2nd century AD.
- Ten thousand martyrs: may refer to either of two groups of possibly-apocryphal Roman-era martyrs.
- Theban Legion: an entire Roman legion who had converted en masse to Christianity and were martyred together in 286.

=== Martyrs of Spain ===
- 233 Spanish Martyrs: 233 martyrs killed during the Spanish Civil War and beatified en masse in 2001 by Pope John Paul II.
- 498 Spanish Martyrs: 498 martyrs killed during the Spanish Civil War and beatified en masse in 2007 by Pope Benedict XVI.
- 522 Spanish Martyrs: 522 martyrs killed during the Spanish Civil War and beatified en masse in 2013 by Pope Francis.
- Martyrs of Córdoba: 48 Christian martyrs who were executed between 850 and 859 under the rule of Muslim conquerors in what is now southern Spain.
- Martyrs of Daimiel: 26 priests and brothers of the Passionist Congregation killed by anti-clericali forces during the Spanish Civil War.
- Martyrs of Turon: 9 Catholics executed by Spanish revolutionaries in 1934.

== Jewish martyrs ==
- Ten Martyrs of Judaism: 10 rabbis living during the era of the Mishnah who were martyred by the Romans in the period after the destruction of the second Temple.
- Woman with seven sons: Woman with seven sons who were arrested and killed during the persecution of Judaism initiated by King Antiochus IV Epiphanes.

== Mormon martyrs ==
- Latter Day Saint martyrs: a list of all people considered martyrs by the Church of Jesus Christ of Latter-day Saints, including historical and present-day figures.

== See also ==
- Roman Martyrology, the official martyrology of the Roman Catholic Church
