= Henry of Appleford =

Henry of Appleford O.S.B. was a Abbot of Reading Abbey monk and ruler of the English county of Berkshire from 1342 to 1361. Originating from the village of Appleford-on-Thames—20 miles north-west and also in Berkshire (now in Oxfordshire) -- all that is otherwise known about him is that his death in 1361 was due to the Black Death.

Catholic Church titles
Preceded by John I (of Appleford)	Abbot of Reading; 1342-1361	Succeeded by William III (of Dombleton)
