= St James's Church, Reading =

St James's Church
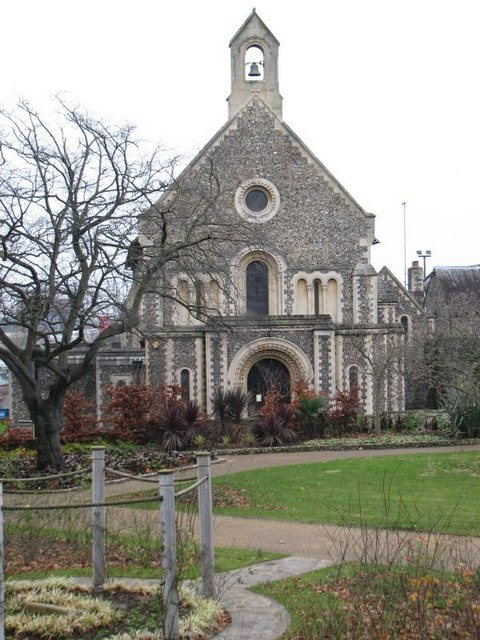
- St James's Church, seen from Forbury Gardens

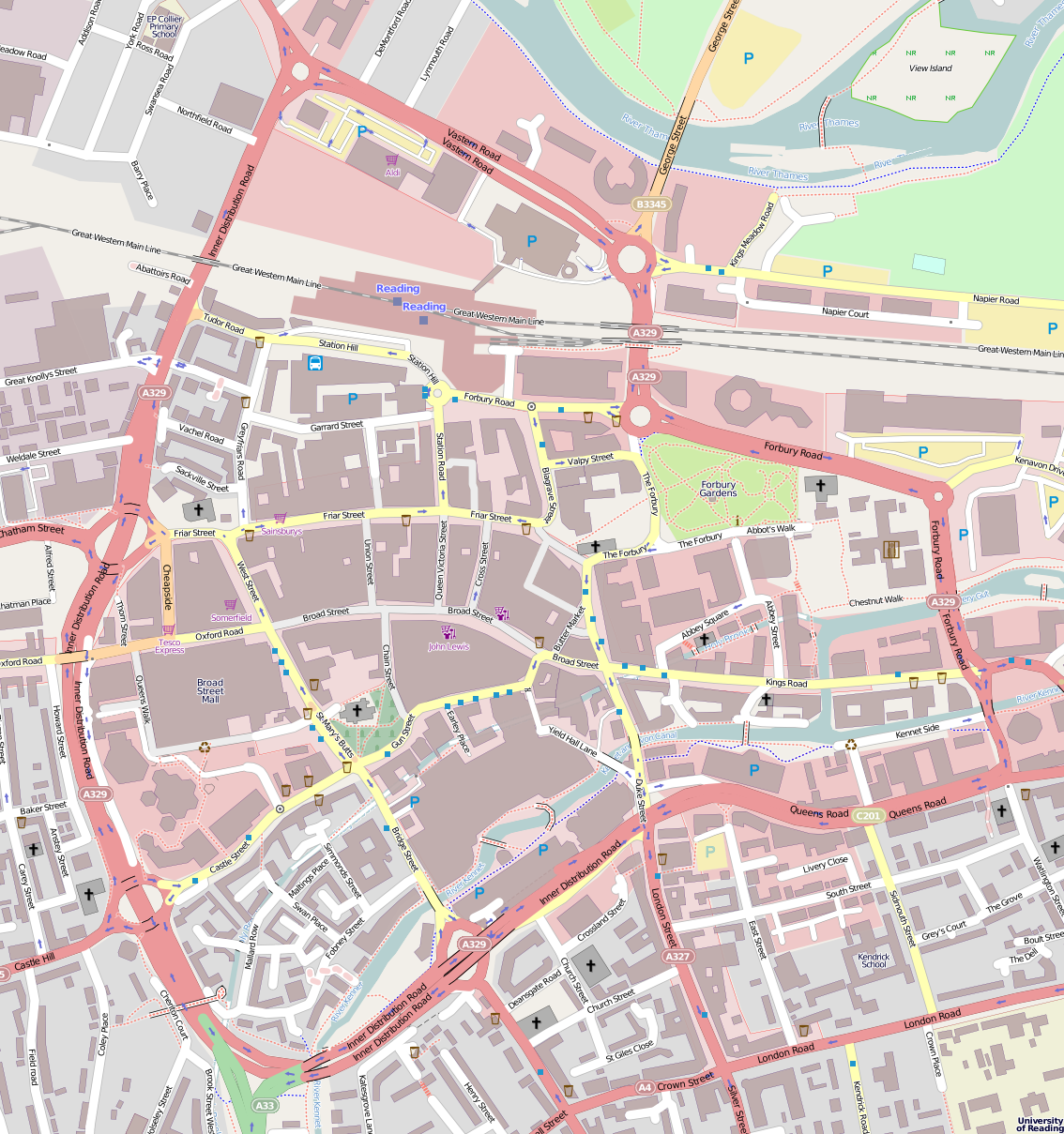
- Location within Reading Town Centre
- 51°27′25.48″N 0°57′55.13″W
- Location: Reading
- Country: England
- Denomination: Roman Catholic
- Website: jameswilliam-reading.org.uk

History
- Founded: 1840
- Dedication: St James

Architecture
- Functional status: Active
- Heritage designation: Grade II
- Architect: A. W. N. Pugin

Administration
- Province: Province of Southwark
- Diocese: Portsmouth
- Deanery: Reading

St James's Church is a Roman Catholic church situated in the centre of the town of Reading in the English county of Berkshire. The church is located next to Reading Abbey ruins, between the Forbury Gardens and Reading Gaol.

St James's Church continues the traditions of Reading Abbey in the post-Reformation era. Its founder was James Wheble, who owned land in the area at that time. The church was designed by the architect A. W. N. Pugin and is one of his first church designs. Parts of the church were built using stones from the Abbey ruins.

The design of the church is Norman, a style not normally associated with Pugin, and was probably influenced by the proximity of the Abbey ruins. The exterior of the building is of flint, with ashlar dressings and a Roman tile roof. Construction started in 1837 and the church opened on 5 August 1840. In 1925, the south aisle and the ambulatory round the apse were added. In 1962, the church was further extended by a north aisle into which was relocated the baptistery. The church is a Grade II listed building.

St James's Church, along with St William of York's Church, forms a joint parish within the Roman Catholic Diocese of Portsmouth. The current parish priest (since February 2010) is Canon John O'Shea. Sunday masses are well-attended often with standing room only; the parish boasts a large number of nationalities among its regular congregation.

Cardinal Cormac Murphy-O'Connor, Archbishop of Westminster from 2000 to 2009, was baptised in St James's and served at the altar there regularly as a boy.
