= Reading Abbey =

Ruined Cluniac abbey in Reading, Berkshire, England

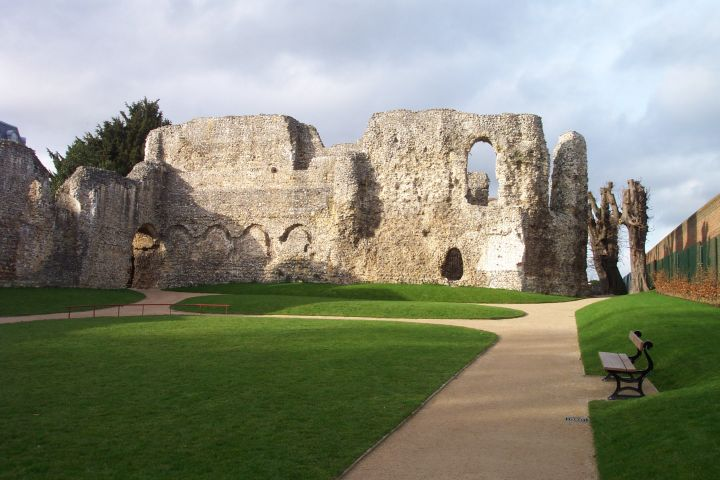
- The chapter house, from the site of the monks' dormitory

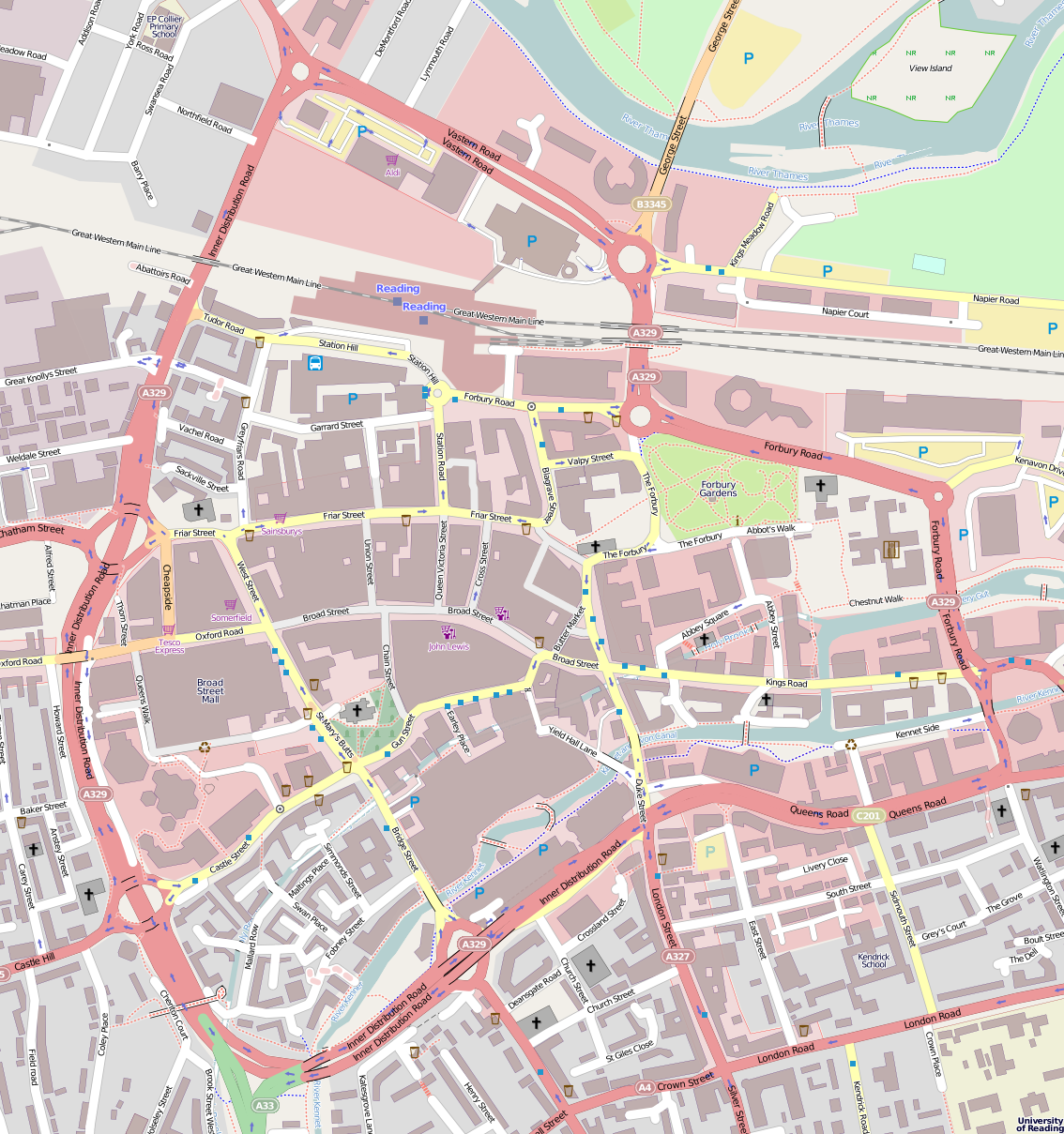
- Location within Reading Town Centre

Monastery information
- Full name: The Abbey of Reading, dedicated to the Virgin and St John the Evangelist
- Order: Cluniac
- Established: 18 June 1121
- Disestablished: 1539
- Dedication: Mary, mother of Jesus; John the Evangelist

People
- Founder: Henry I of England
- Important associated figures: Hugh Faringdon

Site
- Location: Reading, Berkshire, England
- Coordinates: 51°27′23″N 0°57′54″W
- Visible remains: Inner rubble cores of the walls of the major buildings; gateway and hospitium intact.
- Public access: Open daily

Reading Abbey is a large, ruined abbey in the centre of the town of Reading, in the English county of Berkshire. It was founded by Henry I in 1121 "for the salvation of my soul, and the souls of King William, my father, and of King William, my brother, and Queen Maud, my wife, and all my ancestors and successors." In its heyday the abbey was one of Europe's largest royal monasteries. The traditions of the Abbey are continued today by the neighbouring St James's Church, which is partly built using stones of the Abbey ruins.

Reading Abbey was the focus of a major £3 million project called "Reading Abbey Revealed" which conserved the ruins and Abbey Gateway and resulted in them being re-opened to the public on 16 June 2018. Alongside the conservation, new interpretation of the Reading Abbey Quarter was installed, including a new gallery at Reading Museum, and an extensive activity programme.

Abbey Ward of Reading Borough Council takes its name from Reading Abbey, which lies within its boundaries. Now HM Prison Reading is on the site.

== History ==
=== Foundation ===
The abbey was founded by Henry I in 1121. As part of his endowments, he gave the abbey his lands within Reading, along with land at Cholsey, then in Berkshire, and Leominster in Herefordshire. He also arranged for further land in Reading, previously given to Battle Abbey by William the Conqueror, to be transferred to Reading Abbey, in return for some of his land at Appledram in Sussex.

Following its royal foundation, the abbey was established by a party of monks from Cluny Abbey in Burgundy, together with monks from the Cluniac priory of St Pancras at Lewes in Sussex. The abbey was dedicated to the Virgin Mary and St John the Evangelist. The first abbot, in 1123, was Hugh of Amiens who became archbishop of Rouen and was buried in Rouen Cathedral.

According to the 12th-century chronicler William of Malmesbury, the abbey was built on a gravel spur "between the rivers Kennet and Thames, on a spot calculated for the reception of almost all who might have occasion to travel to the more populous cities of England". The adjacent rivers provided convenient transport, and the abbey established wharves on the River Kennet. The Kennet also provided power for the abbey water mills, most of which were established on the Holy Brook, a channel of the Kennet of uncertain origin.

=== Burial of Henry I ===
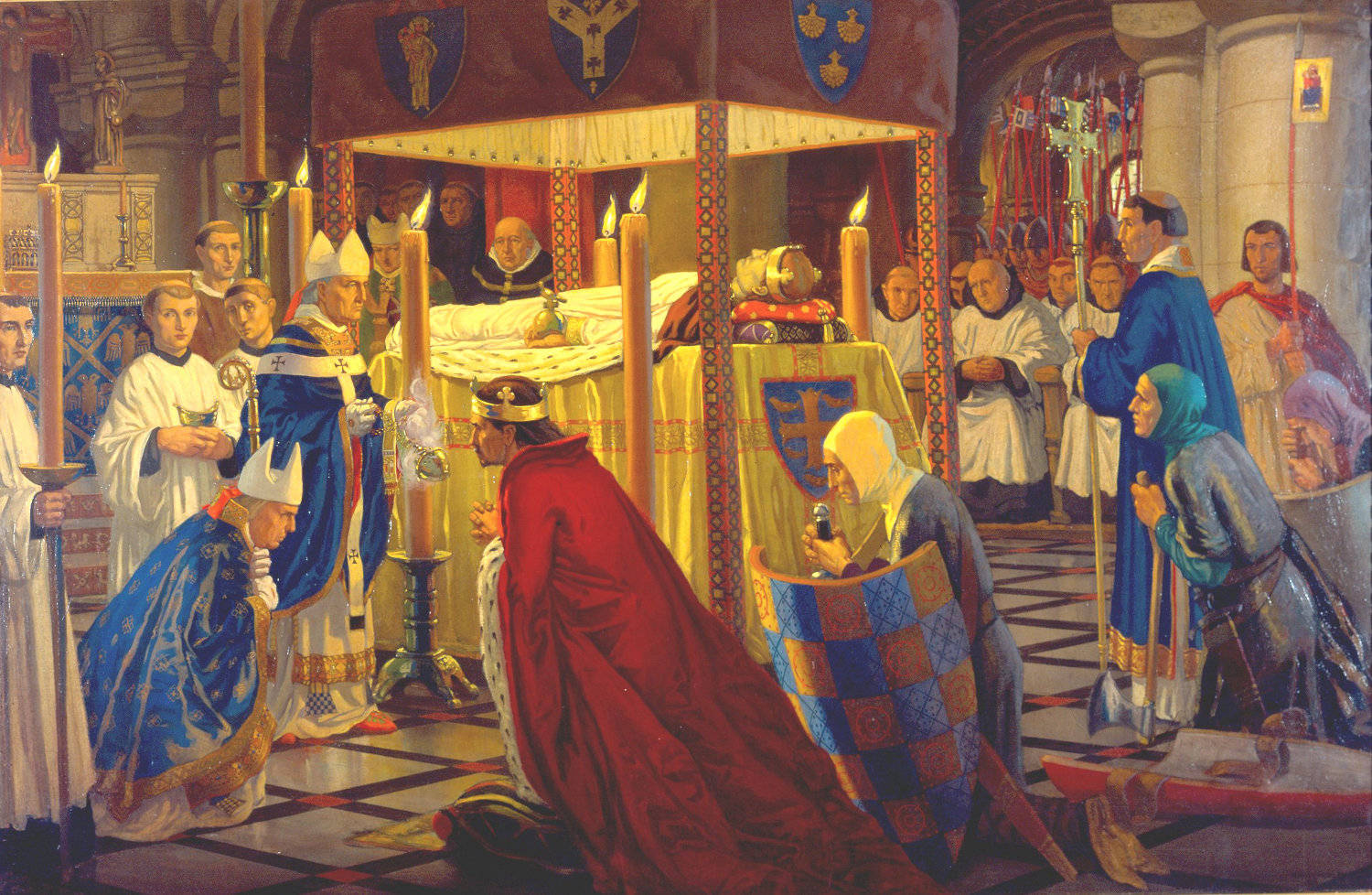
Burial of Henry I at Reading Abbey in 1136, painted by Harry Morley (1916)

When Henry I died in Lyons-la-Forêt, Normandy in 1135 his body was returned to Reading, and was buried in the front of the altar of the then incomplete abbey.

Because of its royal patronage, the abbey was one of the pilgrimage centres of medieval England, and one of its richest and most important religious houses, with possessions as far away as Herefordshire and Scotland. The abbey also held over 230 relics including the hand of St James. A shrivelled human hand was found in the ruins during demolition work in 1786 and is now in St Peter's Catholic Church, Marlow. The song Sumer is icumen in, which was first written down in the abbey about 1240, is the earliest known six-part harmony from Britain. The original document is held in the British Library.

Reading Abbey was frequently visited by kings and others, most especially by Henry III who often visited three or four times a year staying several weeks on each visit. It also hosted important state events, including the meeting between Henry II and the Patriarch of Jerusalem in 1185, the wedding of John of Gaunt and Blanche of Lancaster in 1359 and a meeting of Parliament in 1453.

=== Dissolution ===
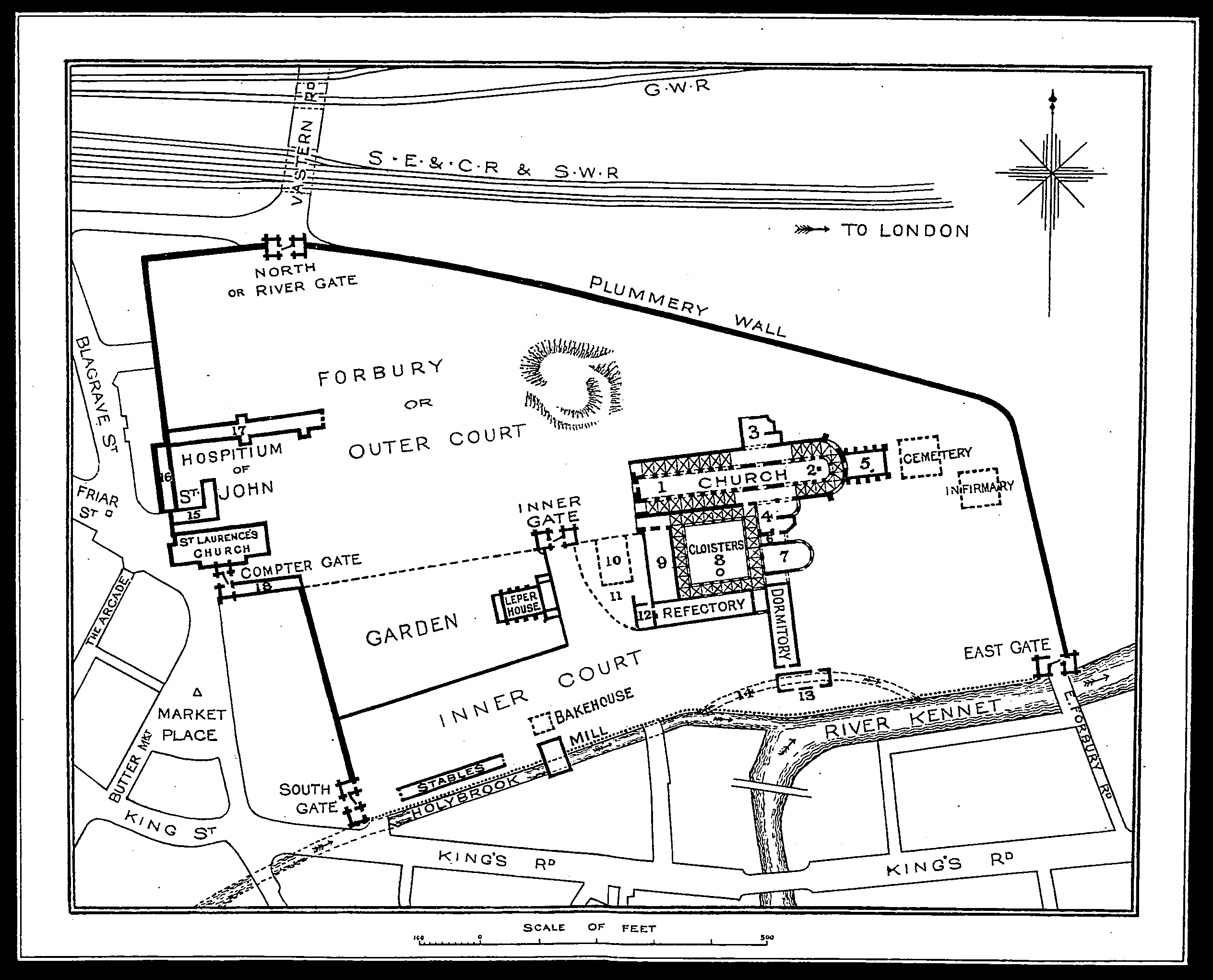
Map of Reading Abbey before its destruction

The abbey was mostly destroyed in 1538 during Henry VIII's Dissolution of the Monasteries. The last abbot, Hugh Faringdon, was subsequently tried and convicted of high treason and hanged, drawn and quartered in front of the Abbey Church. After this, the buildings of the abbey were extensively robbed, with lead, glass and facing stones removed for reuse elsewhere.

Some twenty years after the Dissolution, Reading town council created a new town hall by inserting an upper floor into the former refectory of the hospitium of the abbey. The lower floor of this building continued to be used by Reading School, as it had been since 1486. For the next 200 years, the old monastic building continued to serve as Reading's town hall, but by the 18th century it was suffering from structural weakness. Between 1785 and 1786, the old hall was dismantled and replaced on the same site by the first of several phases of building that were to make up today's Reading Town Hall. Around 1787, Henry Seymour Conway removed a large amount of stone from the wall and used it to build Conway's Bridge near his home at Park Place outside Henley.

St James's Church and School was built on a portion of the site of the abbey between 1837 and 1840. Its founder was James Wheble, who owned land in the area at that time. Reading Gaol was built in 1844 on the eastern portion of the abbey site, replacing a small county Gaol on the same site. James Wheble sold the rest of his portion of the abbey site to Reading Corporation to create the Forbury Gardens, which were opened in 1861.

== Abbey ruins ==
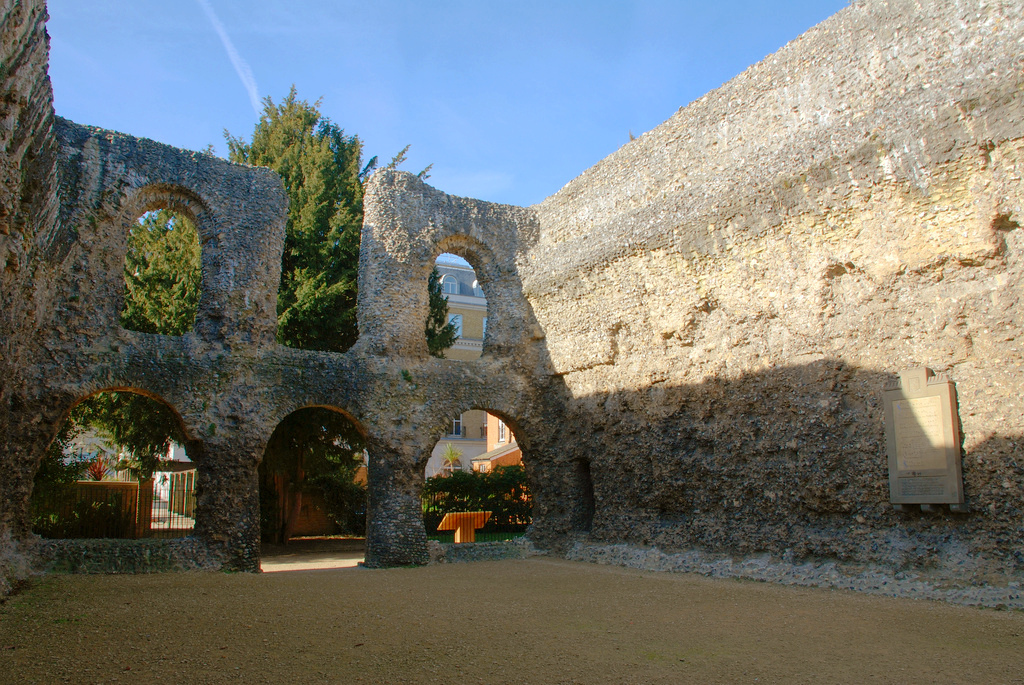
The interior of the ruined chapter house

The inner rubble cores of the walls of many of the major buildings of the abbey still stand. The only parts of the Abbey Church that still exist are fragments of the piers of the central tower, together with parts of transepts, especially the south transept. In a range to the south of this transept are, in order, the remains of the vestry, the chapter house, the infirmary passage and the ground floor of the dorter or monks dormitory and reredorter or toilet block. The best preserved of these ruins are those of the chapter house, which is apsidal and has a triple entrance and three great windows above. To the west of this range, the site of the cloister is laid out as a private garden and to the south is a surviving wall of the refectory. The ruins are Grade I listed and a Scheduled monument

=== Restoration ===
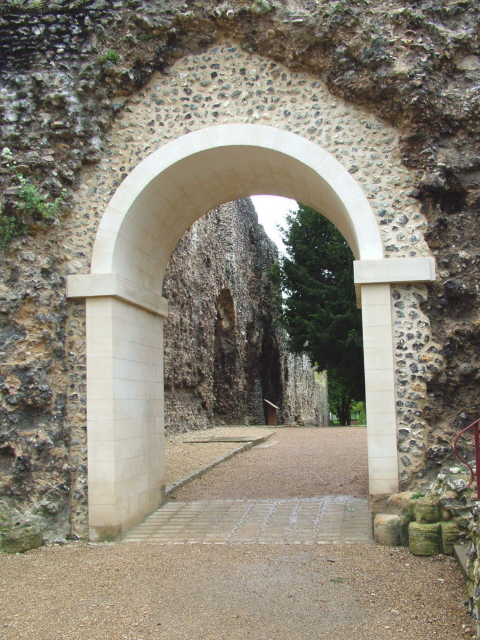
Restoration of an arch done in 2004

Over the years the ruins have been repaired and maintained in a piecemeal fashion leading to their deterioration. In April 2008, the cloister arch, chapter house and treasury were closed to the public. Repair work began in March 2009 and was expected to take only a few weeks, but the entire site was instead closed in May 2009 due to the risk of falling masonry.

In late 2010, Reading Borough Council was reported as estimating that the ruins could cost £3m to repair, but it was also stated that the extent of the damage was yet to be determined. A survey was carried out in October 2010, using three-dimensional scans to build up a detailed view of each elevation, thus helping to identify the extent of the conservation required. In April 2011 plans for an £8m revamp were unveiled, with the aim to create an Abbey Quarter cultural area in Reading. In June 2014 the Council secured initial funding from the Heritage Lottery Fund (HLF); more detailed plans for the project, Reading Abbey Revealed, were then developed and submitted to the HLF in September 2015.

In October 2014, a temporary scaffold roof, not visible from ground level, was installed on the Gateway to allow the building to dry out until funding for more permanent repairs was secured. The HLF confirmed that the second round application had been successful in December 2015. The HLF supported the project with a grant of £1.77 million, with Reading Borough Council match funding of £1.38 million. Historic England provided additional grant funding for initial work to the Abbey gateway and the conservation of the refectory wall. Work began in September 2016 and the ruins reopened to the public on 16 June 2018.

=== Hidden Abbey Project ===
In spring 2014, historian-screenwriter Philippa Langley, best known for her contribution to the exhumation of Richard III in 2012, together with local historians John and Lindsay Mullaney, put together a complementary effort called the Hidden Abbey Project (HAP). The goal of the HAP was to perform a modern comprehensive study, including a non-invasive analysis of the grounds using ground-penetrating radar (GPR). The first phase of the GPR survey, focusing on the Abbey Church, St James’ Church, the Forbury Gardens, and the Reading Gaol car park, began in June 2016. Initial results indicate some potential grave sites behind the high altar in an apse at the east end of the Abbey. There are also some findings probably related to the Abbey's construction, as well as some other potential archaeological targets. News reports seized on the fact that the grave sites were found underneath the Ministry of Justice car park at Reading Gaol. Said The Telegraph:

Britain’s kings appear to be making a habit of this. First it was Richard III, whose bones were found under a car park in Leicester. Now it appears that Henry I may have met a similarly undignified fate.

However, the borough council's press release stated, "The graves are located behind the High Altar in an apse at the east end of the Abbey. They are located east of the area where King Henry I's grave is believed to be. No direct connection between these features and King Henry can be made using these results alone."

== Other remains ==
Besides the ruins of the abbey itself, there are several other remains of the larger abbey complex still extant.

=== Abbey Gateway ===
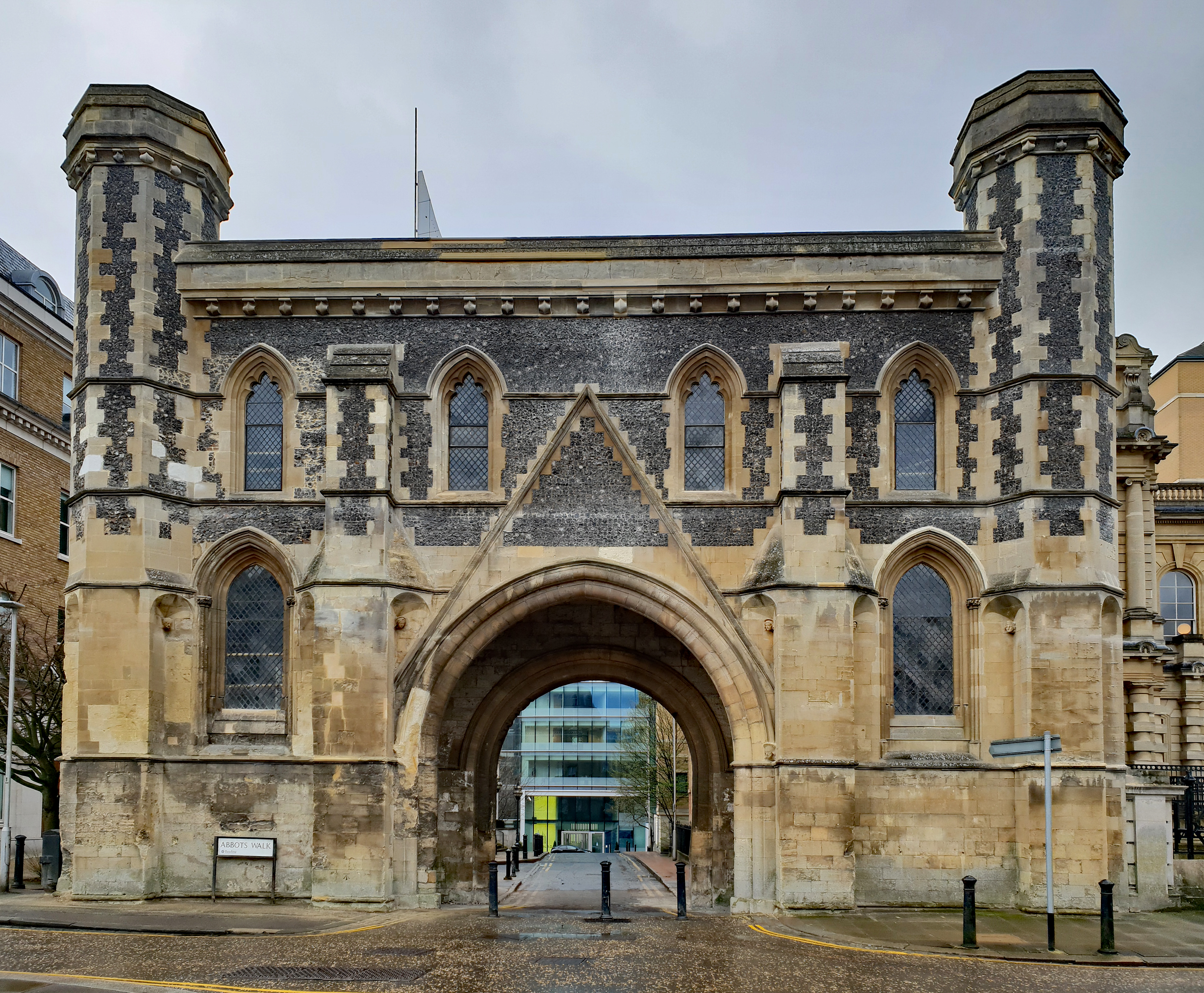
The Abbey Gateway as restored in 2018

The Abbey's Inner Gateway, also known as the Abbey Gateway, adjoins Reading Crown Court and Forbury Gardens. It is one of only two abbey buildings that have survived intact, and is a grade I listed building. The Inner Gateway marked the division between the area open to the public and the section accessible only to monks. Hugh Faringdon, the last abbot of Reading was hanged, drawn, and quartered outside the Abbey Gateway in 1539. The gateway survived because it was used as the entrance to the abbots' lodging, which was turned into a royal palace after the Dissolution. In the late 18th century, the gateway was used as part of the Reading Ladies' Boarding School, attended amongst others by the novelist Jane Austen.

The gateway was heavily restored by Sir George Gilbert Scott, after a partial collapse during a storm in 1861. It was extensively restored again after some decorative stonework came loose and fell into the street in 2010, reopening in 2018. The room above the gateway is now used by Reading Museum as part of its learning programme for local schools, whilst the arch below is available for use by pedestrian and cycle traffic.

=== Hospitium ===
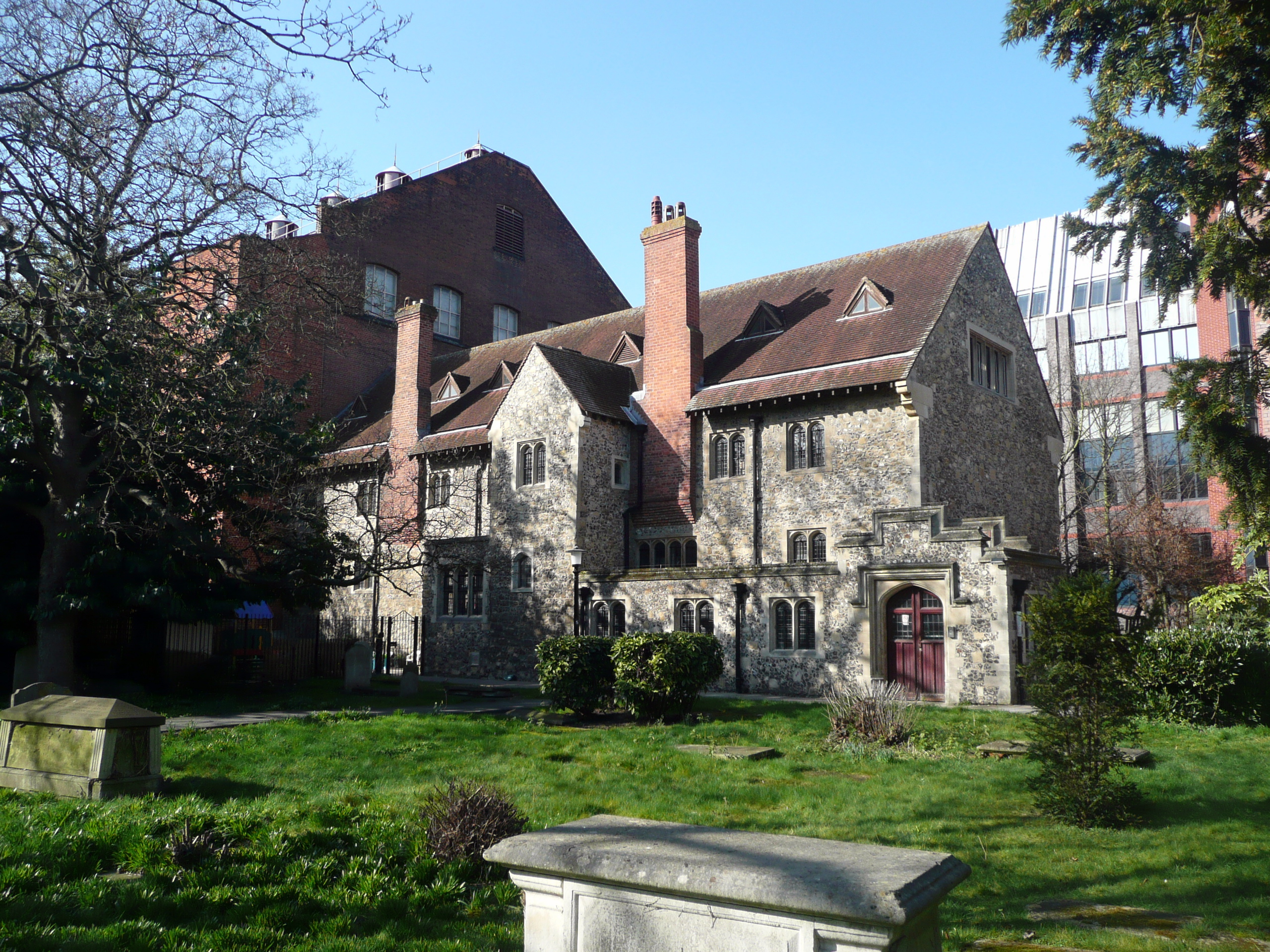
The former hospitium

The abbey's hospitium, or dormitory for pilgrims, also survives. Known as the Hospitium of St John and founded in 1189, the surviving building is the main building of a larger range of buildings that could accommodate 400 people. Much of the remainder of this range of buildings was located where Reading Town Hall now stands. Today the surviving building occupies a rather isolated site, with no direct street access. It abuts the main concert hall of Reading Town Hall to the west, and the south of the building opens directly onto the churchyard of St Laurence's Church. The building is surrounded to the north and east by a modern office development, with a small intermediate courtyard.

=== Abbey Mill and Holy Brook ===
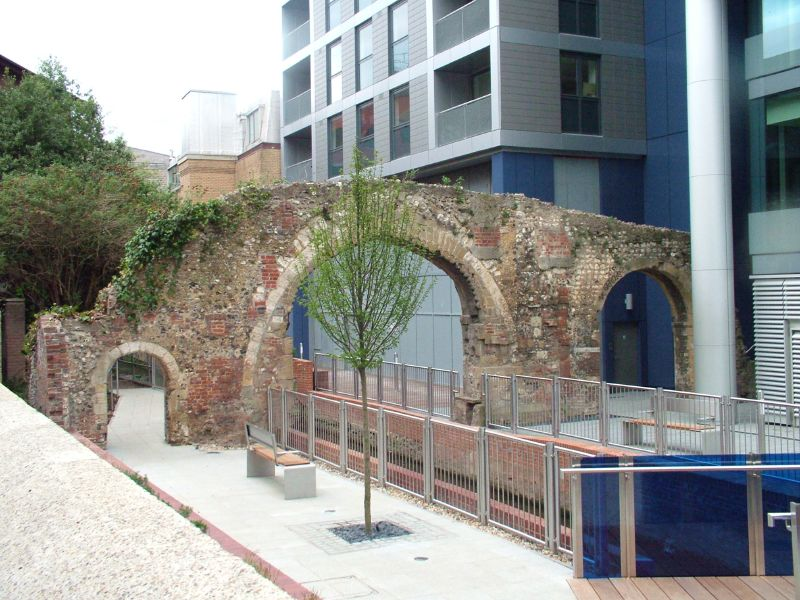
Abbey Mill across the Holy Brook

Some remains of the former Abbey Mill are visible alongside the Holy Brook at the south of the abbey site; they consist of a ruined former watermill on the Holy Brook, a channel of the River Kennet. The ruins are grade II listed. It is situated just to the south of the ruins of the Abbey itself. The water mill originally belonged to Reading Abbey, whose monks are believed to have created the Holy Brook as a water supply to this and other mills owned by them and to the abbey's fish ponds.

The mill was built straddling the Holy Brook which marked the southern boundary of the monastic enclosure. It continued to grind corn into the 1950s. Today, all that remains is a section of wall, pierced by three arches. The wall is built of flint with Caen stone ashlar dressings and brick filling. The two side arches are round headed, whilst the centre arch over the Holy Brook is larger and pointed.

The Holy Brook is a 6 miles (9.7 km) long, largely artificial, watercourse which flows out of the River Kennet near the village of Theale, passes just to the south of the Abbey, and returns to its parent river just downstream of the Abbey Mill.

== Open-air theatre and performance ==
The ruins of Reading Abbey have a history of live performance. From early impromptu artist-led events, the site has established a history of open-air theatre.

In the late 1980s, the food art and performance collective La Grande Bouche organised a cabaret under marquee in the ruins. The evening offered music and performance acts combined with food, much of which cooked by contributing performers.

In 1994, a large scale performance event "From the Ruins" was held in the abbey ruins, the finale event for the "Art in Reading" (AIR) festival, funded in part by Reading Borough Council. This was organised by and featured a large number of artists and performers living or working in Reading, and combined specially created music, dance, paintings, poetry and culminated in a spectacular evening performance involving large scale puppetry and pyrotechnics loosely based upon the history of Reading Abbey from the foundation by Henry I through the rise of the merchant classes to the dissolution and eventual sacking of the Abbey under Henry VIII.

In 1995, the ruined South Transept was used as the setting for the first Abbey Ruins Open Air Shakespeare production by MDM Productions and Progress Theatre in partnership with Reading Borough Council. In 1996, the outdoor production moved to the ruined chapter house and since 1999 has been staged by Progress Theatre in partnership with Reading Borough Council. This annual event expanded to the "Reading Abbey Ruins Open Air Festival" in 2007. Because of the access limitations during the restoration project, the 2009 and 2010 festivals could not be held, and the event was subsequently temporarily relocated to the gardens of Caversham Court. "Shakespeare in the Ruins" returned to the Chapter House in July 2018 after the ruins reopened to the public following extensive conservation.

== Arms ==
Coat of arms of Reading Abbey
Notes The arms feature three scallops, symbolising the Abbey's dedication to St James. The abbot of Reading Abbey was a 'mitred abbot'. Crest A mitre proper Escutcheon Azure, three escallop-shells or

== Abbots ==
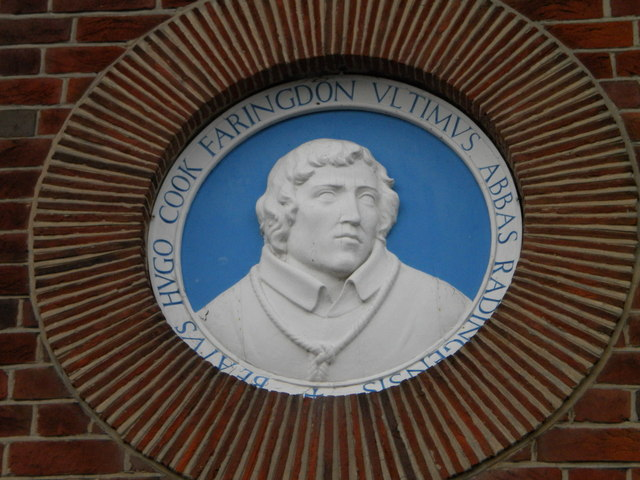
Plaque of Hugh III (Cook, alias Faringdon), the last Abbot

As an abbey, Reading was ruled by an abbot. The abbey had 27 abbots between 1123 and 1539.

Abbot	Years
Hugh I (of Amiens)	1123–1130
Anscher	1130–1135
Edward	1136–1154
Reginald	1154–1158
Roger	1158–1165
William I	1165–1173
Joseph	1173–1186
Hugh II	1186–1199
Helias	1199–1213
Simon	1213–1226
Adam (of Lathbury)	1226–1238
Richard I (of Chichester)	1238–1262
Richard II (of Reading, alias Bannister)	1262–1269
Robert (of Burgate)	1269–1290
William II (of Sutton)	1290–1305
Nicholas (of Whaplode)	1305–1328
John I (of Appleford)	1328–1342
Henry (of Appleford)	1342–1361
William III (of Dombleton)	1361–1369
John II (of Sutton)	1369–1378
Richard III (of Yately)	1378–1409
Thomas I (Earley)	1409–1430
Thomas II (Henley)	1430–1445
John II (Thorne I)	1446–1486
John III (Thorne II)	1486–1519
Thomas III (Worcester)	1519–1520
Hugh III (Cook, alias Faringdon)	1520–1539

== Notable burials ==
- King Henry I
- Anne de Beauchamp, 15th Countess of Warwick
- Constance of York
- Henry fitzGerold
- Reginald de Dunstanville, 1st Earl of Cornwall
- Warin II fitzGerold

== See also ==
- Isle of May Priory, a community of monks from Reading Abbey founded in 1153
- List of parks and open spaces in Reading, Berkshire
