= List of Queen's Counsel in England and Wales appointed in 1951 =

A Queen's Counsel (post-nominal QC), or King's Counsel (post-nominal KC) during the reign of a king, is an eminent lawyer (usually a barrister or advocate) who is appointed by the monarch to be one of "Her Majesty's Counsel learned in the law." The term is recognized as an honorific. Appointments are made from within the legal profession based on merit rather than a particular level of experience. Members have the privilege of sitting within the bar of court. As members wear silk gowns of a particular design (see court dress), appointment as Queen's Counsel is known informally as taking silk, and hence QCs are often colloquially called silks.

The rank emerged in the sixteenth century but came to prominence over the course of the nineteenth. An appointment was open to barristers only until 1995. The first women KCs had been appointed only in 1949. In 1951, 16 people were appointed, all of them men.

== 1951 ==
=== 3 April 1951 ===
| Name | Inns of Court | University | Notes | Ref |
|---|---|---|---|---|
| Sir Alan Edward Ellis, KCB | Inner Temple and Lincoln's Inn (1920) | Brasenose College, Oxford | Born in 1890, Ellis attended the independent Cheltenham College before university. After being called to the bar, he practiced in the Chancery Division until 1930, when he was appointed to the Office of the Parliamentary Counsel. There, he drafted a range of important legislation including the Parliament Act 1949. In 1947, he was appointed First Parliamentary Counsel. He served in that office until 1953, when he became chairman of the Statute Law Committee and a Church Commissioner. In 1955, he was appointed Counsel to the Speaker of the House of Commons. A bencher of the Inner Temple, he was appointed KCB in 1948. He died unmarried in 1960. | |
| Bentley Herbert Waddy, MC | Inner Temple (1920) | Worcester College, Oxford | Waddy was born in 1893 and was schooled at Cheltenham College, a private school, before university. He served in the First World War, receiving the MC. After being called to the bar, he practiced on the South-Eastern Circuit. He was Recorder of Margate (1944–53) and Master of the Worshipful Company of Curriers for the 1941–42 year. He died in 1956, having married twice; his second wife and an adopted daughter survived him. | |
| David Weitzman | Gray's Inn (1922) | University of Manchester | Born in Blackburn in 1898, Weitzman attended Hutchesons' Grammar School in Glasgow and the Manchester Central School, before enrolling at the University of Manchester. From 1916, he served in the First World War. Returning to university on demobilization, he graduated in 1921. After being called to the bar, he practiced on the Northern Circuit. In the 1935 general election, he unsuccessfully contested Stoke Newington for Labour; in 1945, he fought for the seat again and won it. In 1947, he was imprisoned for "contravening orders for the control and limitation of manufacture and supply of toilet preparations" in a much-publicized case known as the "lipstick affair". The conviction was overturned on appeal. He retained his seat (reformed as Hackney North and Stoke Newington from 1950) and sat on Labour's backbenches until he retired from Parliament in 1979. He died in 1987, his first two wives predeceasing him; he was survived by his third wife and several children. | |
| Sir Walker Kelly Carter | Inner Temple (1924) | Sidney Sussex College, Cambridge | Born in 1899, Carter was educated privately. He served in the Royal Field Artillery from 1918 to 1919. His legal career commenced in 1924 and he served as Chairman of the Quarter Sessions for Lindsey from 1945 to 1967 and Kesteven between 1961 and 1967 (both being Parts of Lincolnshire). He chaired the Criminal Injuries Compensation Board (1964–75). Knighted in 1965, he died in 1985, leaving a daughter; his wife had died the previous year. | |
| Ifor Bowen Lloyd | Inner Temple (1925) | Exeter College, Oxford | Lloyd was born in 1902, the son of an Anglican priest; Lloyd's family were Welsh, but unlike them, he could only speak English (having grown up in England). He graduated from Oxford with a history degree in 1924 and practiced on the Midland Circuit as a barrister. In 1959, he was appointed a County Court judge, sitting first in Westminster and then, from 1964 in Wandsworth County Court, retiring in 1976. Lloyd was a Bencher (1959) and Treasurer (1981) of the Inner Temple. Politically, he was a Liberal; he unsuccessfully contested Burton and Chertsey for the party in the 1929 and 1931 general elections respectively. He died in 1990. | |
| Sir Claud Humphrey Meredith Waldock, CMG, OBE | Gray's Inn (1928) | Brasenose College, Oxford | Waldock was born in 1904 in Ceylon, the son of a tea planter. After attending Uppingham School, he read classics at university, before switching to law; graduating in 1927, he took the BCL the following year. After two years of practicing on the Midland Circuit, he was elected to a tutorial fellowship at his old college, Brasenose, where his interests laid in land law and equity. During the Second World War, he served in Military Branch I in the Admiralty (as its head from 1944 to 1945), which brought him into the realm of international law. In 1946, he was appointed the UK's representative to an international commission determining the border between Italy and Yugoslavia. He was then Chichele Professor of Public International Law at the University of Oxford from 1947 to 1972. Alongside advising governments and arguing cases before international courts, he was a member (1954–55) and president (1955–61) of the European Commission of Human Rights and then a judge (1966–71) and president of the European Court of Human Rights (1971–73). He was appointed a judge of the International Court of Justice in 1973 and became its president in 1979, serving until his death in 1981. Among his publications was a general course on public international law, Recueil des Cours (1962), and he edited The Laws of Nations: An Introduction to the International Law of Peace (1963) and The British Year Book of International Law between 1955 and 1973. He was appointed OBE in 1942, CMG in 1946, and knighted in 1961. | |
| Sir George Pollock | Gray's Inn (1928) | – | Born in 1901, Pollock served in the Merchant Navy during the First World War and then worked as a journalist with the Leamington Spa Courier. He was a sub-editor at the Daily Chronicle between 1922 and his call to the bar in 1928. He carried on working in journalism alongside his legal practice until 1933 when he focused solely on the bar. In 1934, he published a biography of Sir Henry McCardie. After the Second World War broke out, he served with the Army's Special Forces which included preparing for a German invasion and postings in Egypt and Italy; he also trained the saboteurs who destroyed the Norwegian heavy water plant in 1943. In 1944 he was appointed Chief Judicial Officer to the Allied Control Commission in Italy and oversaw trials of war criminals. After returning to England he was Recorder of Sudbury between 1946 and 1951. Three years later he retired from the bar and took up the directorship of the British Employers' Confederation. He oversaw the BEC's merger with the Federation of British Industries and the National Association of British Manufacturers to form the Confederation of British Industry in 1965; he did not stand for the director-generalship of the new CBI. Pollock also served on several national advisory councils and was a member of International Labour Organisation (1963–68), the government's Donovan Commission from 1965 to 1968, and the council of the University of Sussex (1974–77). Knighted in 1959, he died in 1991. | |
| Sir Edward Lancelot Mallalieu | Inner Temple (1928) | Trinity College, Oxford | The son of an MP, Mallalieu was born in 1905 and educated at Cheltenham College before going up to Oxford. After being called to the bar, he practiced on the North-Eastern Circuit. He successfully contested Colne Valley at the 1931 general election and was returned to Parliament as a Liberal, serving as Principal Private Secretary to Sir Donald Maclean at the Board of Trade (1931–32) in the National Government. He joined the opposition benches in 1933 and lost his seat in 1935, farming in Ireland for a time. He joined the Labour Party and in 1948 he won a by-election to represent Brigg and retained the seat until the February 1974 election. A backbencher, Mallalieu was the senior member of the Panel of Chairs between 1966 and 1971; he was then successively Second Deputy and (from 1973) First Deputy Chairman of Ways and Means. A keen European, he was Secretary-General of the World Association of World Federalists. He was also Second Church Estates Commissioner from 1965 to 1970. Knighted in 1974, he died in 1979 leaving a wife and three children. | |
| Sir Geoffrey De Paiva Veale | Inner Temple (1929) | Oriel College, Oxford | The son of a doctor, Veale (born 1906) went to Rugby School before Oxford. As a barrister, he practiced on the Northern Circuit; during the Second World War, he spent four years in the Middle East, eventually being promoted to colonel and serving as Deputy Judge Advocate General for the Middle East forces. After the war, he held a range of legal posts in the north of England. He was Deputy Chairman of the Quarter Sessions for the North Riding of Yorkshire (1949–54) and the West Riding (1954–61); he was also Recorder of Scarborough (1950–51), Sunderland (1951–54), Hull (1954–57) and Leeds (1957–61); and the Solicitor-General (1955–57) and Attorney-General (1957–61) for the County Palatine of Durham. He sat on the Bank Rate Tribunal in 1957 and became a High Court Judge in 1961, taking the customary knighthood and sitting in the Queen's Bench Division until he died in 1971. | |
| Sir Alan Abraham Mocatta, OBE | Inner Temple (1930) | New College, Oxford | Mocatta was born in 1907 and educated at Clifton College before he went up to Oxford to read history; he switched to law, graduating in 1929. As a barrister, he practiced on the Northern Circuit. During the Second World War, he served in the Army and between 1942 and 1945 worked at the War Office (eventually being promoted to Lieutenant-Colonel and in 1944 being appointed OBE). He returned to the bar after the war and earned a reputation in commercial litigation. A bencher of the Inner Temple in 1960, the following year he was appointed a High Court Judge (receiving the customary knighthood), sitting in the Queen's Bench division. He was also appointed President of the Restrictive Practices Court in 1970. He retired from the bench and the RPC in 1981 and served as Treasurer of the Inner Temple the following year. Between 1936 and 1984, he edited Scrutton on Charterparties and Bills of Lading (14th through 19th editions). Mocatta was also involved in the Jewish community in Britain; as well as chairing the council of the Jews' College from 1945 to 1961, he was Vice-President (1961–67) and then President (1967–82) of the Board of Elders of the Spanish and Portuguese Jews' Congregation of London; he was President of the Jewish History Society from 1969 and became Chairman of the Oxford Appeal that year (which raised funds to build a synagogue in the city). Mocatta died in 1990, leaving a wife and children. | |
| Henry Burton | Gray's Inn (1930) | Merton College, Oxford | Born in 1907, Burton attended Manchester Grammar School before going up to Oxford. His legal practice included criminal defense work. He died in the Harrow and Wealdstone rail crash in 1952, leaving a widow and two children. | |
| John Harold Bassett | Middle Temple (1931) | University of Glasgow | Bassett was born in 1896, the son of William Bassett of Upton, a civil servant, and educated in Wallasey and the University of Glasgow. After serving in the First World War, he was a private secretary in the Ministry of Labour (1919–20). He was admitted into the Colonial Service in the Federated Malay States in 1921 and posted to Jelebu. He joined the Klang District Office in 1922, and was eventually appointed Assistant District Officer there, before being posted to Ipoh as Town Planning Administrator in 1923; later in the year, he was appointed Deputy Public Prosecutor for Perak, and later still Registrar of the Supreme Court of Ipoh. After a furlough year in England (1930–31), during which time he was called to the bar, Bassett returned to colonial service and was appointed Registrar of the Supreme Court of Penang, Assistant District Judge for the Straits Settlements, and Police Magistrate for Penang. He was then successively Deputy Public Prosecutor for Penang (1932–33) and Singapore (1933–34), before becoming Solicitor-General of the Straits Settlements in March 1934. He retired from that post that November. Bassett then practised as a barrister on the South Eastern Circuit in England. He was appointed a County Court Judge there in 1955 and retired in 1965. He died in 1974. His son was Harold Frank McGhie Bassett (1923–1990), a cardiothoracic surgeon elected FRCS in 1954. | |
| Sir Rawden John Afamado Temple, CBE | Inner Temple (1931) | The Queen's College, Oxford | Temple was born Nessim Sabatai Afoumado in 1908, the son of Elie Raphael Afoumado, a Sephardic Jew from Constantinople who had settled in England and married a woman from Yorkshire. He grew up in Birmingham, attending King Edward's School there, before going up to Oxford. After being called to the bar in 1931, he joined Geoffrey Tyndale's chambers and was advised to change his name, adopting the more English-sounding Rawden Temple (formally in 1939). His growing practice was interrupted by service in the Second World War, as an officer in the Royal Artillery and the War Office. After the war, he enjoyed further success at the bar, practicing in the probate and divorce division. He was appointed Vice-Chairman of the General Council of the Bar in 1960, serving until 1964 (the same year he was appointed CBE). He had hoped to be appointed a High Court Judge, but never was, instead of becoming a National Insurance Commissioner in 1969 and then Chief National Insurance Commissioner in 1975; he retired in 1981, having been knighted in the previous year's Birthday Honours. He was Treasurer of the Inner Temple in 1983, having been a Bencher since 1960. He enjoyed a long retirement before dying in 2000; his wife had predeceased him, but he was survived by two sons, both QCs. | |
| Jocelyn Edward Salis Simon, Baron Simon of Glaisdale | Middle Temple (1934) | Trinity Hall, Cambridge | Simon was born in 1911 in Hampstead, the son of a stockbroker. After Gresham's School, he went up to Cambridge to read English. His initial career at the bar was interrupted by wartime service in the Royal Tank Regiment, which included a period commanding a special service squadron in Operation Ironclad (1942), the Allied invasion of Vichy-France-controlled Madagascar. He was then posted to India and served in the Burma campaign, ending the war a Lieutenant-Colonel. Returning to the bar, he was often junior to Seymour Karminski, KC. In the 1951 general election, he successfully stood as the Conservative candidate for Middlesbrough West; shortly afterward, he was appointed PPS to the Attorney-General and three years later sat on the Percy Commission on mental health law, which eventually led to the Mental Health Act 1959. He was Parliamentary Under-Secretary at the Home Office from 1957 to 1958 (helping to pass the Homicide Act 1957) and then Financial Secretary to the Treasury (1958–59), before he was appointed Solicitor-General and (by convention) knighted. He was, however, compelled to relinquish that office and his seat in the Commons in 1962 when he was appointed President of the Probate, Divorce, and Admiralty Division of the High Court. In 1971, he has created Baron Simon of Glaisdale, and later that year became a Lord of Appeal in Ordinary. He retired in 1977 owing to poor health. Simon was especially concerned with family law; although generally liberal (and increasingly libertarian politically), he was conservative in his views about the family as an institution and about children's wellbeing, which he felt were being eroded by easier access to divorce. However, he also believed that women were often treated unfairly in divorce proceedings and he campaigned to have property and pensions divided more equally. He also firmly believed in the separation of the judicial and legislative branches of government, which led him to make conservative rulings even as he was involved in reform activities outside of court. His retirement from the judiciary allowed him to speak about legislative matters more frankly in the House of Lords, where he remained active until he gave his last speech in 2004; he was highly valued there for his legal expertise. He died in 2006; his wife and three children (including the judge Sir Peregrine Simon, QC) survived him. | |
| Sir John Robertson Dunn Crichton | Middle Temple (1936) | Balliol College, Oxford | Born in 1912, Crichton went to Sedbergh School and then Oxford before he was called to the bar in 1936. He practiced for only three years before the Second World War broke out and he served in the Royal Artillery with the Territorial Army. On demobilization, he resumed his legal career and was appointed Recorder of Blackpool in 1952, serving until 1960. He was also an appeal judge for the Isle of Man from 1956 to 1960. For the following seven years, he was Recorder of Manchester and was a Crown Court Judge there, before he was appointed a High Court Judge in 1967, taking the conventional knighthood that year. He retired in 1977 and died in 1985; he was survived by his wife and three children. | |
| Sir Daniel James Brabin, MC | Inner Temple (1936) | Trinity College, Cambridge | Brabin was born in 1913 and educated at Douai School before he went up to Cambridge. A pupil of Lord Shawcross, his legal career was interrupted by service in the Royal Artillery during Second World War, wherein he earned the MC. He was appointed Recorder of Bolton in 1953, serving until 1962 when he became a High Court Judge and was given the conventional knighthood. In 1966 Brabin carried out an inquiry into the guilty verdict handed down to Timothy Evans, who had been hanged for the murder of his wife and daughter in 1950; the report found that Evans probably did not commit the murder and that his neighbor John Christie, who had subsequently been found to be a serial killer, most likely did. The report led to Evans being posthumously pardoned and the case generated much controversy about the use of the death penalty. Brabin died in 1975, while still a High Court Judge. He was survived by his wife. | |

Source: The London Gazette, 3 April 1951 (no. 39190), p. 1757.
