= Num =

Num may refer to:

- Short for number
- Num (god), the creator and high god of the Nenets people of Siberia
- Short for the Book of Numbers of the Hebrew Bible
- Khnum, a god of Egyptian mythology
- Mios Num, an island of western New Guinea
- Num, Nepal
- num, the code for the Niuafo'ou language of Tonga

NUM may refer to:

- National Union of Manufacturers, a former employers' association in the United Kingdom
- National Union of Mineworkers (Great Britain)
- National Union of Mineworkers (South Africa)
- National University of Mongolia
- New Ulster Movement in Northern Ireland
- National Ugly Mugs, a charity operating a reporting system for sex workers, formerly known as the UK Network of Sex Work Projects
- Nurse Unit Manager
- n-um.com (N-UM), popular website about different Islam topics, in Bosnian language
- NUM, the National Rail station code for Northumberland Park railway station, London, England

== See also ==
- Nummi (disambiguation)
- Number (disambiguation)
- Numb (disambiguation)
