= George Pollock (barrister) =

British QC (1901 – 1991)

Sir George Pollock, QC (15 March 1901 – 28 April 1991) was a British barrister, journalist, and military officer. He served as Director of the British Employers' Confederation from 1954 to 1965.

== Biography ==
Born in 1901, Pollock served in the Merchant Navy during the First World War and then worked as a journalist with the Leamington Spa Courier. He was a sub-editor at the Daily Chronicle between 1922 and his call to the bar in 1928. He carried on working in journalism alongside his legal practice until 1933 when he focused solely on the bar. In 1934, he published a biography of Sir Henry McCardie. In 1938, he made legal history when he secured the acquittal of a woman charged with murder at petty session; before that, prisoners charged with murder were inevitably committed for trial at the assizes.

After the Second World War broke out, he served with the Army's Special Forces which included preparing for a German invasion and postings in Egypt and Italy; he also trained the saboteurs who destroyed the Norwegian heavy water plant in 1943. In 1944 he was appointed Chief Judicial Officer to the Allied Control Commission in Italy and oversaw trials of war criminals.

After returning to England he was Recorder of Sudbury between 1946 and 1951. He was made a King's Counsel in 1951. Three years later he retired from the bar and took up the directorship of the British Employers' Confederation. He oversaw the BEC's merger with the Federation of British Industries and the National Association of British Manufacturers to form the Confederation of British Industry in 1965; he did not stand for the director-generalship of the new CBI. Pollock also served on several national advisory councils and was a member of International Labour Organisation (1963–68), the government's Donovan Commission from 1965 to 1968, and the council of the University of Sussex (1974–77). Knighted in 1959, he died in 1991.
