= George Pollock (disambiguation) =

Sir George Pollock, 1st Baronet (1786–1872) was a British Indian Army officer.

George Pollock may also refer to:

- George Pollock (Australian politician) (1890–1939), member of the Queensland Legislative Assembly
- George Pollock (director) (1907–1979), British film director
- George David Pollock (1817–1897), British surgeon
- George Pollock (1886–1950), engineer and president of Pollock-Stockton Shipbuilding Company and Pollock Construction Company in Stockton, California
- George Pollock (barrister) (1901–1991), British barrister, journalist, military officer, and director of the British Employers' Confederation
- George Frederick Pollock (1821–1915), British barrister
