= Numb =

Numb may refer to:

== Biology and healthcare ==
- NUMB (gene), a human gene
- Numbness, a reduced sense of touch or sensation, or a partial loss of sensitivity to sensory stimuli
- Numb, having deficient sensation (psychology)

== Arts, entertainment, and media ==
=== Music ===
==== Groups ====
- Numb (band), a Canadian industrial band
- Northwestern University Marching Band, an American college marching band

==== Albums ====
- Numb (Hammerbox album), 1993
- Numb (Linea 77 album), 2003
- The Numb E.P., a 1996 EP by Baboon
- Numb, a 2022 album by Lewis Taylor

==== Songs ====
- "Numb" (August Alsina song), 2013
- "Numb" (Hayden James song), 2017
- "Numb" (Holly McNarland song), 1997
- "Numb" (Honey Ryder song), 2008
- "Numb" (Linkin Park song), 2003
- "Numb" (Marshmello and Khalid song), 2022
- "Numb" (Natasha Hamilton song), 2026
- "Numb" (Pet Shop Boys song), 2006
- "Numb" (Portishead song), 1994
- "Numb" (U2 song), 1993
- "Numb" (Usher song), 2012
- "Numb" (Veridia song), 2018
- "Numb", a song by 21 Savage from the album Issa Album
- "Numb", a song by The Airborne Toxic Event
- "Numb", a song by Archive from the album You All Look the Same to Me
- "Numb", a song by David Archuleta
- "Numb", a song by Joel Berghult (Roomie)
- "Numb", a song by Beyond the Black from the album Songs of Love and Death
- "Numb", a song by Jaira Burns
- "Numb", a song by Gary Clark Jr. from the album Blak and Blu
- "Numb", a song by The Devil Wears Prada from the album The Act
- "Numb", a song by Disturbed from the album The Sickness
- "Numb", a song by Drowning Pool from the album Desensitized
- "Numb", a song by Marina and the Diamonds from the album The Family Jewels
- "Numb", a song by Melanie C from the album Version of Me
- "Numb", a song by Nick Jonas from his self-titled album
- "Numb", a song by Pink from the album Missundaztood
- "Numb", a song by Rihanna from the album Unapologetic
- "Numb", a song by Sia from the album Colour the Small One
- "Numb", a song by Slapshock from the album Project 11-41
- "Numb", a song by XXXTentacion from the album ?
- "N.U.M.B", a song by Diana Vickers from the album Songs from the Tainted Cherry Tree
- "Numb", a song by Robbie Williams from Under the Radar Volume 2
- "Numb", a song by Exodus from the album Blood In, Blood Out

=== Other uses in arts, entertainment, and media ===
- Numb (2007 film), a 2007 film starring Matthew Perry
- Numb (2015 film), a Canadian film
- Numb (2025 film), a Japanese film starring Takumi Kitamura
- "Numb" (Doctors), a 2003 television episode
- "Numb" (The Killing), a 2012 television episode

== See also ==
- "Comfortably Numb", a 1979 song by Pink Floyd, also covered by Scissor Sisters
- Num (disambiguation)
- Number (disambiguation)
