= List of Knights of Sidonia episodes =

Artwork for the first Knights of Sidonia volume that was released in Japan in both DVD and Blu-ray format

Knights of Sidonia is an anime television series produced by Polygon Pictures, and based on the manga series by Tsutomu Nihei. It is directed by Kobun Shizuno, assisted by Hiroyuki Seshita, with scripts by Sadayuki Murai and character designs by Yuki Moriyama. The series tells the story of Nagate Tanikaze, an "under-dweller" destined to become a Garde pilot, whose mission is to defend the massive spaceship Sidonia from a hostile alien species called Gauna. The opening theme for the first season is "Sidonia" by angela while the ending theme is "Show" (掌) by Eri Kitamura. A second season aired from April 10, 2015, to June 26, 2015. The opening theme for the second season is Kishi Kōshinkyoku (騎士行進曲, Knight March) by angela while the ending theme is "Requiem" by CustomiZ. On June 16, 2017, a third season for the series was confirmed to be in development by director Hiroyuki Seshita.

== Series overview ==
Season	Episodes	Originally released	
Season	Episodes	First released	Last released
1	12	April 10, 2014	June 27, 2014
2	12	April 10, 2015	June 26, 2015

== Episode list ==
=== Knights of Sidonia (2014) ===
No.	Title	Written by	Original release date
1	"Commencement"; Transliteration: "Uijin" (Japanese: 初陣)	Sadayuki Murai	April 10, 2014
Deep within the massive spaceship Sidonia, a hungry Nagate Tanikaze ventures outside his underground shelter, but he ends up arrested for stealing manufactured rice and admitted to the hospital for his injuries. Although managing to escape the hospital, Nagate is subdued by an arrogant Norio Kunato, before he is taken to the police station by Shizuka Hoshijiro. Instead, Ochiai escorts Nagate to see Captain Kobayashi, who proposes him to become a Garde pilot through a cadet training program for Type 18 Gardes. Nagate befriends Izana Shinatose, an intersex third gender whose body can adapt after finding a mate. The training program teaches that the main mission is to defend Sidonia against a hostile alien species called Gauna, which destroyed Earth in the distant past but have not been seen in a century. Nagate is later called to his first sortie, and he is entrusted with Tsugumori, a legendary Type 17 Garde that belonged to a famous war hero, since its controls are similar to his Garde virtual training console in his shelter. While the cadet squads perform a mining expedition at a nearby asteroid, Gauna 487 suddenly erupts beneath the surface, leaving Nagate severely injured and Tsugumori heavily damaged.
2	"Oblivion"; Transliteration: "Hoshizora" (Japanese: 星空)	Sadayuki Murai	April 17, 2014
Eiko Yamano is killed and absorbed by Gauna 487, which soon disturbingly takes on the appearance of Eiko. Nagate regains consciousness and furiously launches a solo assault on Gauna 487 against orders, as the Heavy Mass Cannon is fired from Sidonia to drive it off. Lacking the spear-like weapon called the Kabizashi necessary to destroy Gauna 487, the surviving cadets retreat to Sidonia, while the Heavy Mass Cannon blasts Gauna 487 away. As a funeral is held for Eiko, a war with the Gauna is officially declared. Three days later, Izana takes Nagate to Eiko's memorial, but Nagate ends up feeling traumatized and uneasy due to what he saw at the mining expedition. However, his injuries have healed astonishingly fast, despite being forced to remain wearing his orthopedic cast during his recovery period. Meanwhile, the four highest ranking veteran pilots, led by Mochikuni Akai, pay a visit to the academy. They approach a confused Nagate, while ignoring Norio in their path. Nagate is also stopped by Yuhata Midorikawa, who offers to be his friend.
3	"Glory"; Transliteration: "Eikō" (Japanese: 栄光)	Sadayuki Murai	April 24, 2014
Nagate is inquired about his fight with Gauna 487, but the Akai squad decides to leave the matter alone due to Nagate's recovery, while Yuhata is anxious to know the answers. Later that night, Nagate learns about the annual Gravity Festival taken place, in which a tournament among Garde pilots is being held. At the festival, Nagate encounters Shizuka, who pays for his teppanyaki meal. Izana feels flustered upon seeing them together, injuring herself with a candied apple when bumping into an angered Norio. Nagate is injured again when attempting to confront Norio as a consequence. Meanwhile, Kobayashi learns from Ichirō Seii that Gauna 487 has reappeared and is en route to Sidonia. While recovering, Nagate and Izana are invited by Mochikuni for a ride inside a massive water reservoir before the Akai squad are called to their sortie to destroy Gauna 487, privileged only to high-ranking pilots. The next day, the cadets watch as Mochikuni and his fellow squad members Hinata Momose, Kashiwade Aoki and Izumo Midorikawa depart to confront the enemy, but the operation shockingly ends in failure as all four pilots are killed one by one.
4	"Choice"; Transliteration: "Sentaku" (Japanese: 選択)	Tetsuya Yamada	May 2, 2014
After killing the members of the Akai squad, Gauna 487 proceeds on a collision course towards Sidonia, prompting Kobayashi to order an emergency evasive maneuver by accelerating diagonally. This causes massive casualties in the spaceship's residential district, despite the efforts of the citizens to brace themselves. As Gauna 487 turns back to target the spaceship again, Nagate, Shizuka, Norio and En Honoka are ordered to salvage the Kabizashi used by the Akai squad. Just as the Kabizashi is retrieved, Gauna 487 turns its attention to them and fires a Gauna Particle Cannon, a red laser beam, that incapacitates all their Gardes except for Nagate's Tsugumori. Shizuka's Garde goes haywire, which forces her to eject from her Garde. Nagate grabs the Kabizashi and solely destroys Gauna 487, disobeying orders to tow Norio and En back to Sidonia. As the others celebrate Nagate's feat, he selfishly leaves in search for Shizuka, despite being warned that he will undoubtedly pass the point of no return to the Sidonia.
5	"Adrift"; Transliteration: "Hyōryū" (Japanese: 漂流)	Shigeru Murakoshi	May 9, 2014
Nagate finds Shizuka, but Tsugumori runs out of power and the pair are left floating in space for seven days with limited emergency life support. Nagate details his knowledge of survival, which comes from his life underground and surpassing the high score of his grandfather Hiroki Saitō in the Type 17 Garde virtual training console when he was six years old. Meanwhile, Lala Hiyama, Nagate's dorm manager, urges a search party to be organized for Nagate, but Kobayashi refuses. The other cadets learn in history class that the Gauna first split Earth in two in 2109. Sidonia embarked on its journey on August 2, 2384, and the last communication with another seed spaceship with the Aposimz occurred on February 26, 2691. The discovery of Kabi, the catalyst in the Kabizashi, was made 600 years ago by the first strike force, which included Kobayashi, Kiyama, Saitō and Ochiai. After Nagate and Shizuka have spent eleven days in Tsugumori, their food and water supplies finish faster than expected, leaving them in a dire situation. Suddenly, 256 Garde pilots appear to rescue Nagate and Shizuka.
6	"Salutations"; Transliteration: "Keirei" (Japanese: 敬礼)	Sadayuki Murai	May 16, 2014
Nagate and Shizuka return to Sidonia, where they are heralded as heroes for their survival of being stranded in outer space for three weeks. Nagate, Shizuka, Norio and En are promoted to official Garde pilots following their services in the battle against Gauna 487. During the festivities, Norio apologizes to Nagate for his previous behavior, as the four of them practice a clasp formation with their hands. Nagate later questions Kobayashi about why Saitō raised him underground and why his wounds heal quickly, but Kobayashi says that she would like Nagate to be a knight of Sidonia. After the party, Nagate is approached by Yuhata, who accompanies him to the water reservoir, with Shizuka and Izana joining them. However, Yuhata attempts to get Nagate alone with her in a bathysphere. Izana's interference causes Nagate to ride alone with Shizuka instead. The two spend some quality time together until they are called for another sortie, as Gauna 488, shown as a pod, approaches Sidonia. Nagate and Shizuka depart to confront Gauna 488, but Nagate wakes up in the hospital some time later where he learns that Shizuka was killed during battle.
7	"Resolve"; Transliteration: "Kakugo" (Japanese: 覚悟)	Shigeru Murakoshi	May 23, 2014
After discovering that Shizuka was among the casualties, Nagate recounts his memories during the battle against Gauna 488. Nine squads were deployed, as the Kunato squad was tasked with destroying the tail of Gauna 488 using explosives and detonating on Norio's command. However, Norio activated a private channel with Nagate and deliberately ordered him to detonate his explosives early, causing Gauna 488 to shake the other explosives loose. As the other pilots were ordered to retreat and regroup, a stunned Nagate was thrashed by the tail. Nagate lost consciousness, but Shizuka saved him from being killed at the expense of her own life. The remaining pilots managed to destroy most of Gauna 488, but seven pilots were killed in action. In the present, a depressed Nagate is forced by Hiyama to spend some time with Izana, and he slowly regains his confidence in piloting Tsugumori. Meanwhile, Kobayashi orders the destruction of a rogue planet where Gauna 488 has fled using the Interplanetary Missile, but Gauna 489, 490 and 491 appear from the remnants. With Yuhata instated as a new executive officer, she assembles a suppression force to intercept and destroy the three Gauna, which have taken the form of Gardes.
8	"Immortality"; Transliteration: "Fushi" (Japanese: 不死)	Tetsuya Yamada	May 30, 2014
The Samari, Nakazono and Kunato squads split up and confront Gauna 489, 490 and 491. While Gauna 491 and 489 are destroyed by the Kunato and Samari squads, Gauna 490 communicates via radio with Shizuka's voice after killing each member of the Nakazono squad. When Hō Honoka and Ren Honoka attack Gauna 490, Hō is killed before Gauna 490 retreats, thereby aborting the mission. The surviving pilots later mourn the loss of five fallen comrades. Hiyama learns from Kobayashi that Nagate is immortal and naturally skilled, hence why he is deployed for every mission. Afterwards, Hiyama recalls 100 years ago after the Fourth Gauna War when Ochiai was spared from execution because several archives from Sidonia were copied into his brain, then relocated to an auxiliary database and transferred into his clone. After the incident, Saitō disappeared without a trace, only reappearing 14 years ago, 80 years after the breach, as an elderly man renouncing his immortality. Later, with Hiyama's help, Saitō kidnapped his own infant clone, claiming that he would teach him how to become a Garde pilot. In the present, a Gauna placenta sample retrieved by Nagate is currently in containment, having the same appearance and voice as Shizuka.
9	"Empathy"; Transliteration: "Manazashi" (Japanese: 眼差)	Sadayuki Murai	June 6, 2014
Shortly after the Fourth Gauna War, Yure Shinatose managed to integrate photosynthesizing with the remaining humans and restore population of Sidonia to 500,000 in the course of 100 years, roughly six generations. In the present, Nagate and Izana meet Numi Tahiro at the Extraterrestrial Research Division (ERD) to see how Placental Shizuka would react in Nagate's presence, but she instead reacts violently while in containment. Meanwhile, Norio, who no longer can pilot due to psychological distress, witnesses through the security cameras that Kobayashi, Yure and Ochiai have entered a restricted area. Kobayashi and Yure unlock access and connect to the auxiliary brain of Ochiai, revealed as the clone, putting him to sleep afterwards. As both Izana and Yuhata display affection towards Nagate, he is called back by Numi on many occasions to run more tests with Placental Shizuka, who momentarily shows less hostility and more mimicry towards Nagate over time. Also, Nagate is promoted to squad leader by Seii and leads his squad on several successful battles against the Gauna. Later, Numi analyzes that Placental Shizuka would look unerringly at the Kabizashi storage, far off in another part of Sidonia, seemingly scared.
10	"Decisions"; Transliteration: "Ketsui" (Japanese: 決意)	Shigeru Murakoshi	June 13, 2014
Nagate, Izana and Yuhata travel to an inn, where Kobayashi is shown as the innkeeper. After Yuhata shares written proof about Ochiai's forbidden research to Nagate and Izana, the three go to an old research facility to investigate. However, they are soon sedated by security guards after they take an elevator. After being awaken by Yure and Kobayashi, Nagate is shown a Gauna/human hybrid corpse, and explained how artificial Kabi can be manufactured to destroy the Gauna. Kobayashi then appoints Nagate as the test pilot for a new weapons system. Nagate returns to the inn with Izana and Yuhata, who awake with no recollection, while Nagate feigns ignorance. Nagate is then brought to Toha Heavy Industries, where both the new weapon, Super High Speed Ballistic Acceleration Device (SHS-BAD), a long-range projectile launcher, and a new Garde propulsion system are being developed. Gauna 541 is discovered moving to intercept a colonization ship carrying pacifists. Kobayashi approves Nagate for deployment with the untested prototypes, and he eventually eradicates Gauna 541 moments before it reaches the colonization ship using his second shot after stabilizing his Garde. He later saves a worried Izana, recently promoted to Garde pilot, from falling to her death.
11	"Collision"; Transliteration: "Shōtosu" (Japanese: 衝突)	Tetsuya Yamada	June 20, 2014
Gauna 542 is detected approaching Sidonia, as it is revealed to be a massive pod shown as 8,000 times the size of Sidonia which its placenta has covered an asteroid. Even when Yuhata maneuvers Sidonia with its thrusters, Gauna 542 changes its path to maintain a collision course. Kobayashi orders that all 48 Garde pilots be equipped with the SHS-BAD and be deployed, while an Interplanetary Missile is launched at Gauna 542, two hours before impact. As the pilots evenly divide into two platoons, the first platoon tries to destroy as much placenta as possible, while the second platoon destroys most of the tail, or propulsion core. The placenta beneath the first platoon morphs into Gauna Particle Cannons, while Gauna 490, now dubbed the Crimson Hawk Moth suddenly appears and annihilates the second platoon. With only 14 Garde pilots remaining from the first platoon and one hour left until the Interplanetary Missile makes impact, Yuhata formulates a plan to use the Heigus Particle Cannon in order to allow the pilots to fly into Gauna 542 and destroy its host core. The use of the Heigus Particle Cannon causes a temporary blackout in the residential district.
12	"Home"; Transliteration: "Kikan" (Japanese: 帰艦)	Sadayuki Murai	June 27, 2014
After the Heigus Particle Cannon makes impact, the 14 Garde pilots regroup and attempt to break into the placenta. With her Garde damaged, Ren entrusts Nagate with her last core-piercing projectile before she withdraws from battle. Nagate confronts the Crimson Hawk Moth in a vicious duel, even with daring help from Izana, while Ittan Samari and the seven remaining pilots make their way to destroy the host core of Gauna 542. Kōichi Tsuruuchi exhausts his power supply to break through the last barrier protecting the host core, and the remaining members of the Samari platoon destroy the host core. Meanwhile, Nagate exhausts his ammunition fighting the Crimson Hawk Moth. As a last resort, he fires Tsugumori's left hand holding the core-piercing projectile at the Crimson Hawk Moth, thereby destroying it. Carrying Tsuruuchi with them, Samari and Seii escape to safety with the others as the Interplanetary Missile obliterates Gauna 542. At Sidonia, Ren thanks Nagate for avenging Hō's death, explaining that the Honoka sisters are only five years old, which they have undergone accelerated growth and compressed mental training. Later, while visiting Norio, Nagate is unable to forgive him, but still expresses desire to fight alongside him.

=== Knights of Sidonia: Battle for Planet Nine (2015) ===
No. overall	No. in season	Title	Written by	Original release date
13	1	"Discord"; Transliteration: "Kattō" (Japanese: 葛藤)	Sadayuki Murai	April 10, 2015
Now recognized as the ace pilot of Sidonia, Nagate Tanikaze is sent by headquarters to the military academy, in order to make a demonstration of his skills on the newest Garde virtual training console for the students. Meanwhile, Norio Kunato and Mozuku Kunato decide to explore the abandoned research lab of Ochiai and their bodies are invaded by parasites. Now under Ochiai's control, Norio and Mozuku visit the ERD and put the body of Numi Tahiro under control of a parasite as well. When Nagate later arrives at the ERD to visit Placental Shizuka, he learns that she was moved somewhere else. Depressed upon her disappearance, Nagate turns to Norio for answers, but to avail. Nagate hears from Yuhata Midorikawa that Placental Shizuka is under custody for research and that he must not see her again. Some time later, Gauna 549 approaches Sidonia and Nagate joins the sortie against it, piloting the Tsugumori Custom. However, Nagate and the other Garde pilots fail to break through the upgraded placenta of Gauna 549 until a huge Gauna-like creature appears to assist them. With Norio acting as its pilot, the creature introduces itself as Tsumugi Shiraui.
14	2	"Ability"; Transliteration: "Nōryoku" (Japanese: 能力)	Shigeru Murakoshi	April 17, 2015
With her Gauna Particle Cannon destroyed, Tsumugi attacks Gauna 549 with her bare hands, while Nagate steps in to save her from being restrained. Upon obtaining authorization from Norio, Tsumugi destroys Gauna 549 by piercing right through it. Captain Kobayashi and Norio then announce that Tsumugi is a chimera, a Gauna/human hybrid developed inside Sidonia. After the battle, all of Ochiai's research is extracted from the auxiliary brain, and Kobayashi decides that she will be the only one with direct access to it. Norio holds a meeting to introduce Tsumugi to the public. Upon seeing Nagate, Tsumugi becomes overly excited and thanks him for helping her, accidentally shaking the entire room. This causes the public to become frightened and turn against her, forcing Norio to end the meeting. Later, Nagate and Izana Shinatose pay a visit to Tsumugi and befriend her. Meanwhile, the Immortal Ship Committee unanimously decide to impeach Kobayashi and have her replaced, but Ochiai appears before them and reveals that he was listening to their conversation, killing all of them under Kobayashi's orders.
15	3	"Course"; Transliteration: "Shinro" (Japanese: 針路)	Tetsuya Yamada	April 24, 2015
With the Immortal Ship Committee now dead, Kobayashi announces that Sidonia will set a course for the Lem Star System, pursuing the Gauna Hive Cluster which threatens the colonists of planet Lem VII. Sasaki tells Ochiai that Toha Heavy Industries can reinforce sixty Type 18 Gardes with the new hybrid material. Meanwhile, Yure Shinatose recalls that Norio created Tsumugi by impregnating Placental Shizuka with human DNA, though unaware that it is seemingly pregnant again. Later on at the hospital, Nagate brings some rice balls to a recovering En Honoka, who was critically injured following the battle against Gauna 488, but he comes in at the wrong time, embarrassing En. Yuhata learns more about Tsumugi in the database, paying her a visit and befriending her while crossing paths with Nagate and Izana. Just as Tsumugi is being sent out for a joint exercise, she glimpses Gauna 550 approaching Sidonia, undetected because it assimilated the colonists' ship. After Tsumugi departs to attack Gauna 550 by herself, Gauna 550 creates a massive netting to trap her. A platoon of 96 Garde pilots depart to assist her.
16	4	"Rage"; Transliteration: "Gekikō" (Japanese: 激昂)	Tetsuya Yamada	May 1, 2015
The Garde pilots form a defensive line against a second wave of netting incoming from Gauna 550. When Tsumugi manages to free herself and despite her wounds, she fights on in a frenzied state, disobeying Norio's orders to retreat. It is until Izana's Garde become damaged from Tsumugi's reckless attacks that Tsumugi tows Izana to safety. Gauna 550 then fuses its netting into a single structure that fires a powerful Gauna Particle Cannon, destroying several Gardes and threatening to deal a lethal blow to Sidonia. However, Tsumugi uses her own body as a shield to deflect the beam and protect the spaceship. Before Gauna 550 has a chance to fire again, Nagate ejects Tsugumori Custom's own main propulsor to create an explosion that exposes the host core for the other pilots, allowing them to destroy Gauna 550 for good. Once recovering, Nagate calls for Izana and Tsumugi. A heavily wounded Izana responds for help, with her Garde cradling the deeply wounded body of Tsumugi.
17	5	"Desire"; Transliteration: "Ganbō" (Japanese: 願望)	Shigeru Murakoshi	May 8, 2015
After losing her right arm and left leg in the battle, Izana has them replaced with prosthetic limbs, while Tsumugi is put in a special regeneration chamber. Nagate feels gloomy due to Tsumugi's condition, but he cheers up later on when he learns from Mozuku that Tsumugi is fully recuperated. Nagate and Izana decide to help Tsumugi see more of Sidonia by exploring some abandoned tunnels. Meanwhile, Sidonia arrives at the Lem Star System to confront the Gauna Hive Cluster and fires its reverse thrusters to slow down just as Nagate and Izana are inside the tunnels, nearly killing them. However, they find a way to allow Tsumugi to look at the residential district through her probe, much to her joy. Back to the dormitory, Nagate finds that his room was allocated to another cadet and his possessions was dumped outside his room. He then shocks Izana with a call by asking if he can stay at her house overnight.
18	6	"Startup"; Transliteration: "Kidō" (Japanese: 起動)	Sadayuki Murai	May 15, 2015
While Nagate spends the night with Izana, Tsumugi emerges from the floor, much to their surprise. Meanwhile, Yure and Numi are busy assembling a new giant weapon, the Gravitational Beam Emitter, designed by incorporating Gauna placenta into the structure. During a joint exercise, Mozuku pilots Tsumugi while Nagate pilots Tsugumori Custom both at high speeds and in synchronization. Nagate later searches for a new house closer to Tsumugi's chambers, from which Tsumugi can easily visit him by sneaking her probe through the pipe network. Once he finds a suitable home, he invites Izana to move in with him as well. The trial for the Gravitational Beam Emitter proves to be a success, as it easily pierces through a dwarf planet. However, it is overlooked when the weapon begins to sprout tentacles at its base, which spread in the direction of the power cables.
19	7	"Rumbling"; Transliteration: "Meidō" (Japanese: 鳴動)	Sadayuki Murai	May 22, 2015
With the Gravitational Beam Emitter now out of control, a team of 20 Garde pilots and Tsumugi are assigned to check on the situation. As Kobayashi, Norio and Ochiai evacuate, Yure attempts to shut down the device when it suddenly implodes, annihilating all matter in the vicinity and nearly killing her. In spite of this, Kobayashi insists on continuing development of the weapon in preparation for the imminent war with the Gauna. Nagate, Samari, En and Ren Honoka are introduced to the Hayakaze, a prototype autonomous support cuirass to link four pilots together. Samari later invites Nagate out for dinner, where she confides her fears of issuing orders as a pilot. After being cheered by Nagate's reassurance, Samari expresses her desire to photosynthesize with him, only to find that he has passed out. Later that night, Yuhata pays a visit to Nagate and Izana's house, revealing that she is aware about Tsumugi living with them. She asks them to keep Tsumugi's presence a secret. Yuhata also observes that Izana's body is developing female features, presumably in response to her budding feelings for a man. Meanwhile, the colonists are attacked by the Gauna Hive Cluster while surveying Lem VII.
20	8	"Reunion"; Transliteration: "Saikai" (Japanese: 再会)	Unknown	May 29, 2015
Arriving home after helping with repairs to the damage from the Gravitational Beam Emitter trial run, Nagate and Izana are surprised to find that Yuhata has moved into their house. Izana meets with Yure, as they take a walk wearing revealing dresses. As Yure is called back to work, Izana tries to sneak back home to change, but she runs into Nagate on the way home. Upon meeting with Sasaki, Yure reveals to her what really happened during the Gravitational Beam Emitter test and asks for her help. After Izana unhappily notices that Nagate and Tsumugi does a clasp formation after continuing with repairs, Yure coerces Nagate into inviting Izana to the Thousand-Year Village, one of the most picturesque parts of Sidonia, treating this so-called top-secret mission like an important cultural heritage investigation. Izana happily accepts his invitation, believing that he intends to take her on a real date, much to Yuhata's distress.
21	9	"Duty"; Transliteration: "Ninmu" (Japanese: 任務)	Unknown	June 5, 2015
Nagate and Izana visit the Thousand-Year Village, awed by its cherry blossoms and other natural attractions, while Yuhata and Tsumugi search for a way to spy on them. However, Izana discovers that Nagate had taken her there by orders of Yure, causing Izana to believe that Nagate does not care about her. Yuhata and Tsumugi, who witnessed Nagate and Izana fight, return home and spend a sleepless night worried about what happened between them. Meanwhile, as Sidonia arrives at the Lem Star System, a reconnaissance party of four pilots using the Hayakaze is prepared in order to secure a foothold on Lem IX. Izana is called in as a replacement for a pilot who was arrested for desertion. Halfway through the mission, Izana, piloting the Type 19 Shinatose Custom due to the superhuman dexterity of her prosthetic hand, detects a hazy object which is revealed to be a Lem Gauna Wall. It proves resistance to artificial Kabi, and the reconnaissance team is forced to scatter. Nagate and Tsumugi, fearing for Izana's life, can only watch helplessly through the monitor.
22	10	"Entry"; Transliteration: "Shinnyū" (Japanese: 進入)	Unknown	June 12, 2015
The reconnaissance team attempts to retreat and regroup, but two members are killed while the squad leader's Garde is damaged. When Kobayashi refuses Yuhata's request to mount a rescue, Norio intervenes and convinces Kobayashi to allow Nagate and Tsumugi to deploy, an excellent opportunity for Nagate to field-test the Tsugumori Custom 2. Meanwhile, Izana and the squad leader enter the atmosphere of Lem IX using a piece of the Hayakaze as a heat shield. As they are pursued by the Lem Gauna Wall as it splits into dozens of Gauna, Izana realizes that it is attracted to the artificial Kabi that they lost. Suspecting that it also reacts to Heigus particles, she discards the Garde fuel tanks, proving correct as the Lem Gauna Wall ceases its pursuit. The loss of the fuel tanks leaves them with only minimal energy to help them maneuver down onto the surface. Nagate and Tsumugi reach Lem IX and cut through the Lem Gauna Wall in their path, that is until they encounter the Crimson Hawk Moth in the form of Shizuka Hoshijiro. Tsumugi decides to confront the Crimson Hawk Moth alone in order to allow Nagate to search for Izana.
23	11	"Chance Meeting"; Transliteration: "Kaikō" (Japanese: 邂逅)	Unknown	June 19, 2015
Izana and the squad leader abandon their crashed Gardes and explore the surface of Lem IX. However, they are spotted and chased by a humanoid Gauna to the edge of a cliff, which collapses beneath them. As they fall in the direction of a swarm of Gauna, they are rescued in the nick of time by Nagate, who is forced to exhaust his ammunition before using his synthetic Kabi blade on the last three targets. Meanwhile, Tsumugi defeats the Crimson Hawk Moth, but she hesitates to destroy its core when Placenta Shizuka appears from the inside. Before Tsumugi can react, the Crimson Hawk Moth pierces Tsumugi in the throat with a spike and drains the majority of her energy supply to restore itself. The Crimson Hawk Moth then impales Tsumugi with a volley of spikes, but Nagate appears and engages the Crimson Hawk Moth in combat. When Nagate's visual signal malfunctions during the battle, the Crimson Hawk Moth infiltrates Nagate's cockpit and Placenta Shizuka appears in front of him.
24	12	"Decisive Battle"; Transliteration: "Kessen" (Japanese: 決戦)	Unknown	June 26, 2015
As Placental Shizuka removes Nagate's space helmet and attempts to merge with him, Izana switches the systems of the Tsugumori Custom 2 to auxiliary power, allowing Nagate to deal a killing blow to the Crimson Hawk Moth. After Nagate releases Tsumugi from the spikes, the Samari squad equipped with the Hayakaze appears to wipe out the oncoming swarm of Gauna, retrieving Nagate and Tsumugi and effectively conquering the planet. Nagate is embarrassingly forced to carry the nude Placental Shizuka in his arms while cradling Tsumugi in his Tsugumori Custom 2 as he returns to Sidonia with the rest of the squad. As Nagate is decorated for his bravery, Lala Hiyama urges Kobayashi to stop using Nagate for political gain, but Kobayashi remarks that she understands the difficulty of sustaining a long war after a hero has fallen. Tsumugi later upsets Nagate when she dresses up like Shizuka, but he takes Izana and Tsumugi to a food stand to make up for his outburst. After visiting the hospital and the rice factory, Nagate leaves his medal of honor in the underground shelter where he was raised by Hiroki Saitō as a sign of gratitude before being deployed for his next mission.
