= John Leycester Adolphus =

English lawyer, jurist and author (1795–1862)

John Leycester Adolphus (1795–1862) was an English lawyer, jurist and author.

== Life ==
He was the son of Martha Elizabeth née Leycester (1765–1842) and John Adolphus (1768–1845), a well-known London barrister who wrote A History of England to 1783 (1802), A History of France from 1790 (1803) and other works.

Adolphus was educated at Merchant Taylors' School and at St. John's College, Oxford. In 1821 he published "Letters to Richard Heber, Esq.", in which he discussed the authorship of the then anonymous Waverley novels, and fixed it upon Sir Walter Scott. This conclusion was based on the resemblance of the novels in general style and method to the poems acknowledged by Scott. Scott thought at first that the letters were written by Reginald Heber, afterwards bishop of Calcutta, and the discovery of J. L. Adolphus's identity led to a warm friendship.

Adolphus was called to the bar in 1822, and in the same year he married Clara Richardson (1808–1892). His Circuiteers, an Eclogue, is a parody of the style of two of his colleagues on the Northern Circuit. He became judge of the Marylebone County Court in 1852, and was a Bencher of the Inner Temple. Adolphus was a member of the Athenaeum Club, London. He was the author of "Letters from Spain" in 1856 and 1857 (1858), and was completing his father's "History of England" at the time of his death on 24 December 1862.

Legal offices
Preceded by Unknown	Solicitor-General of Durham; 1855–1862	Succeeded by John Archibald Russell
