= The Number (book) =

2004 book by Jonny Steinberg

The Number: One Man's Search for Identity in the Cape Underworld and Prison Gangs
- Author: Jonny Steinberg
- Publisher: Jonathan Ball Publishers
- Publication date: 2004
- ISBN: 9781868422050

The Number: One Man's Search for Identity in the Cape Underworld and Prison Gangs is a non-fiction book written by Jonny Steinberg about South Africa's criminal tradition of prison gangs and published in 2004 by Jonathan Ball Publishers.

The book won South Africa's premier nonfiction literary award, the Sunday Times Alan Paton Award.

The author researched prison gangs based in Pollsmoor Prison, resulting in the books The Number and the later Nongoloza's Children.

== Overview ==
Steinberg has written about South Africa's criminal justice system for the Institute for Security Studies in Pretoria and the Centre for the Study of Violence and Reconciliation in Johannesburg, South Africa. He received a doctorate in political theory while studying at Oxford University.

The Number is based on 50 hours of interviews with the 43-year-old member of the 28's gang Magadien Wentzel, one of the inhabitants of Pollsmoor Prison in Cape Town. It details his life story, from growing up in the ghettos of Cape Town, through incarceration and his struggles to re-adapt to life outside prison.

In a review for Kronos, Andrew M. Jefferson stated that the book can be read two ways: as "a succinct commentary on the racially and socially warped world of Cape Town. As such, it is a book about marginalization and coping in Cape Town where violence, stigmatization and incarceration are everyday realities for coloured men. And it can be read as a prison ethnography of which there are precious few in a non-western context."

In 2018, a symposium took place at the MacMillan Center at Yale University to discuss the book.
