= Absolute number =

Absolute number may refer to:

- Quantity, a property that can exist as a multitude or magnitude

== Mathematics ==
- Absolute value, the non-negative value of a real number without regard to its sign
- Absolute error, the absolute value of an approximation error in some data
- Absolute difference, the absolute value of the difference of two real numbers
- Absolute pseudoprime, a class of pseudoprimes that come from Fermat's little theorem
- Absolute scale, system of measurement that begins at a zero point and progresses in only one direction

== See also ==
- Absolute zero, the lowest limit of the thermodynamic temperature scale
- Absolute magnitude, a measure of the luminosity of a celestial object
- Relative change and difference, used to compare two quantities taking into account the "sizes" of the things being compared
- Absolute (disambiguation)
- Number (disambiguation)
