= Numi =

Numi may refer to:

== Places ==
- Ñumí, Paraguay; a district in the Guairá Department

== People ==
=== Fictional characters ===
- Numi, a character in the U.S. TV series Patriot (TV series)
- Numi Tahiro (田寛 ヌミ, Tahiro Numi); a character from Japanese property Knights of Sidonia, see List of Knights of Sidonia characters

== Food and drink ==
- Noomi herbal tea (also spelled as "numi" tea), a type of dried lime tea
- Numi Organic Tea, a tea brand and tea company

== Other uses ==
- NuMI (Neutrinos at the Main Injector), a high energy physics experiment at Fermilab
- Ñumí Mixtec (Ñumí), a Mixtec language
- Neumi (Korean: 느미; also spelled as "Numi") a 1980 Korean film, also called "The Deaf Worker"

== See also ==
- Numis, a financial institution located in the City of London ("the City")
- NUMIS (Northwestern University Multislice and Imaging System), see Multislice
- "Numi Numi", a 2004 artwork by Shuli Nachshon
- Numi-Torem, the supreme god of the Ob-Ugrian peoples
- Nummi (disambiguation)
