= Circuits of England and Wales =

Judicial areas in England and Wales

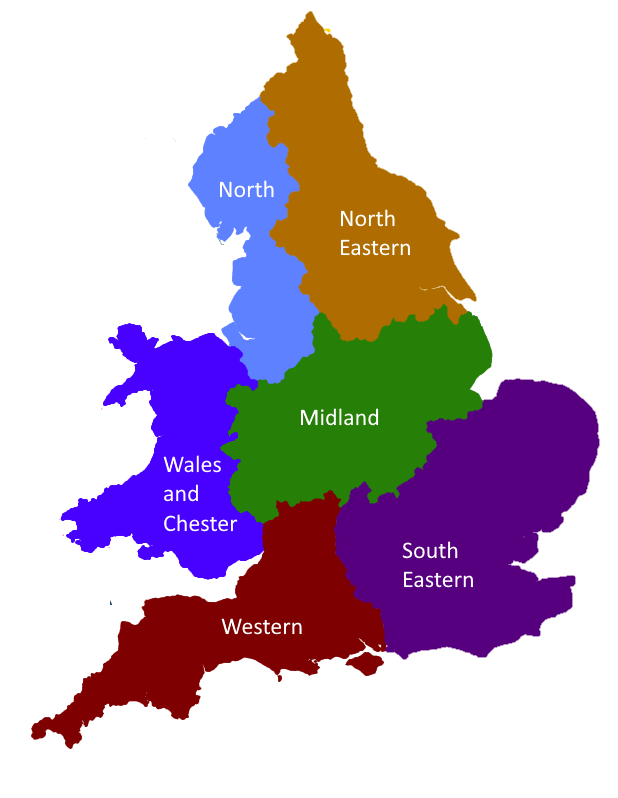
A map of the circuits of England and Wales.

Circuits are the highest-level administrative divisions of the Bar of England and Wales and His Majesty's Courts and Tribunals Service. Today, they serve as professional associations for barristers practising within their areas, as well as administrative divisions for the purposes of administration of justice.

There are six circuits in total: Midland, Northern, North Eastern, Western, Wales and Chester, and South Eastern.

There is also the European Circuit, which is an association of barristers with interests in European law. Though it is called a circuit and recognised by the Bar Council, it does not serve any administrative or judicial purposes.

Circuits are divided along local authority area borders.

== History ==
The term "circuit" is derived from the English custom of itinerant courts whose judges periodically travelled on pre-set paths—circuits—to hear cases from different areas. In 1293, a statute was enacted which formally defined four assize circuits. These would change frequently over the next few centuries.

By the 1500s, there were six different circuits: Home, Midland, Norfolk, Oxford, Northern, and Western. This remained largely constant until the 19th century. Twice each year, judges "literally rode each circuit," meaning that a pair of common law judges assigned to a circuit rode on horseback through all the county towns and several other important towns in each circuit and heard cases.

The current circuits originate from the 1969 Beeching Commission, which recommended the merger of the Midland and Oxford circuits. Since then only minor boundary changes have been made, such as in the 1998 Review of Criminal Justice Boundaries.

== Functions ==
=== As part of the Bar Council ===
Circuits effectively function as professional associations for barristers, providing support and advice for their members. They work with HM Courts and Tribunals Service and other government bodies, as well as hosting continuing professional development and social events.

Each circuit is represented on the Bar Council through its leader and other appointed representatives.

They are closely linked with specialist bar associations, who may appoint representatives to each circuit.

=== As part of the judiciary ===
Circuits also serve a judicial function as judges (except for judges of the Court of Appeal and the Supreme Court) are appointed to, and will only sit in, a specific circuit. This avoids judges having to travel large distances to hear cases.

The circuits system is overseen by the Lord Chancellor.

== Leadership ==
Each circuit elects a leader to represent it, to serve a three-year term. The current leaders are:

Circuit	Leader	Election	Reference
Midland	Harpreet Sandu KC	2024	
Northern	Jaime Hamilton KC	2022	
North Eastern	Jason Pitter KC	2023	
Western	Jo Martin KC	2022	
South Eastern	Claire Davies KC	2024	
Wales and Chester	Caroline Rees KC	2022	

Potential leaders must be King's Counsel. A circuit may also appoint other leadership positions, such as a circuit junior or treasurer, who will often form its executive committee.

Circuit leaders are entitled to sit on the Bar Council ex officio.

== See also ==
- Assizes
- Circuit riding
