= Nongoloza's Children =

Book by Jonny Steinberg

Nongoloza's Children: Western Cape Prison Gangs During and After Apartheid
- Author: Jonny Steinberg
- Language: English
- Genre: Non-fiction
- Publication date: 2004

Nongoloza's Children: Western Cape Prison Gangs During and After Apartheid, a book written as a monograph about the gangs from prisons of the Western Cape during and after racial isolation, was written for the Centre for the Study of Violence and Reconciliation by Jonny Steinberg. It explores the prevalence of gangs in society and in prisons and offers recommendations for solving post-apartheid gang violence.

== Overview ==
The author writes that he spent nine months of research at PollsMoor Prison Admission Center. There he interviewed the prisoners, most of whom were awaiting trial. For an 18-month period he interviewed about 30 veterans members of gangs. During the 1980s and 1990s all of them served their sentences in prisons throughout the Western Cape.

According to Steinberg, The Numbers Gangs take their inspiration from the historical figure Nongoloza Mathebula, born Mzuzephi Mathebula, who became the founder of The Number Gangs in South Africa. An early Johannesburg bandit, he built a quasi-military band of outlaws, welding his small army together with a simple but potent ideology of banditry-as-anti-colonial-resistance.

== See also ==
- Numbers Gang
