= Norman Kipping =

Sir Norman Victor Kipping, GCMG, KBE, JP (11 May 1901 – 29 June 1979) was a British electrical engineer and industrialist. He was Director-General of the Federation of British Industries from 1946 to 1965.
