= James Willoughby Jardine =

Willoughby Jardine

His Honour Willoughby Jardine KC (29 October 1879 – 15 October 1945), was a British Judge and Liberal Party politician.

== Background ==
Jardine was born the eldest son of James Jardine, KC. He was educated at Eton School and King's College, Cambridge. In 1910 he married Lettice Joyce Sutton. They had three sons and one daughter. One of his sons was senior civil servant Christopher Willoughby Jardine.

== Professional career ==
Jardine was appointed as a King's Counsel in 1927. He served as Solicitor-General of the County Palatine of Durham, from 1932 to 1939 and Attorney-General of the County Palatine of Durham, from 1939 to 1940. He was a Judge of Bow County Courts from 1940 to 1945.

== Political career ==
Jardine was Liberal candidate for the Whitby division of the North Riding of Yorkshire at the January 1910 General Election. He was Liberal candidate for the Maldon division of Essex at the December 1910 General Election. He did not stand for parliament again.

=== Electoral record ===
General Election January 1910
Party	Candidate	Votes	%	±%
Conservative	Gervase Beckett	5,161	52.9	+2.5
Liberal	James Jardine	4,602	47.1	−2.5
Majority		559	5.8	+5.0
Turnout		9,763		
Conservative hold		Swing	+2.5	

General Election, December 1910: Maldon
Party	Candidate	Votes	%	±%
Conservative	James Fortescue Flannery	5,386	53.4	−0.7
Liberal	James Jardine	4,693	46.6	+0.7
Majority		693	6.8	−1.4
Turnout				
Conservative hold		Swing	-0.7	
