= Geoffrey Streatfeild (judge) =

Sir Geoffrey Streatfeild MC

Justice of the High Court
- In office 1947–1966

Personal details
- Born: Geoffrey Hugh Benbow Streatfeild; 28 July 1897
- Died: 7 October 1979 (aged 82)
- Education: Rugby School

Sir Geoffrey Hugh Benbow Streatfeild, MC (28 July 1897 – 7 October 1979) was a British barrister and High Court judge in the Queen's Bench Division from 1947 until 1966.

== Biography ==
The younger son of Major H. S. Streatfeild, of Ryhope, County Durham, and Barlay, Balmaclellan, Kirkcudbrightshire, Geoffrey Streatfeild was educated at Rugby School. Joining up directly from school at the outbreak of the First World War in 1914, he served with the 4th Battalion, Durham Light Infantry, before transferring to the Royal Flying Corps, and the Royal Air Force. He was wounded in action and received the Military Cross.

Leaving military service in 1919 with the rank of Captain, Streatfeild was called to the Bar by the Inner Temple in 1921, practiced on the North-Eastern Circuit, and became a King's Counsel in 1938. He was Recorder of Rotherham from 1932 to 1934, of Huddersfield from 1934 to 1943, and of Kingston-upon-Hull from 1943 to 1947. He was Solicitor-General of County Durham from 1939 to 1941 and Attorney-General of County Durham from 1941 to 1947. He was elected a Bencher of the Inner Temple in 1945.

During the Second World War, he was Deputy Judge Advocate (with the rank of Major) from 1940 and Assistant Judge Advocate-General (with the rank of Lieutenant-Colonel) from 1942 to 1943. He was appointed a Commissioner of Assize for the Western Circuit in 1946.

Streatfeild was appointed a Justice of the High Court in 1947 and received the customary knighthood. He was assigned to the King's Bench (later the Queen's Bench) Division, where he sat until his retirement from judicial service in 1966. He was chairman of the Interdepartmental Committee on the Business of the Criminal Courts (the Streatfield Committee) from 1958 to 1960. He was also Deputy Chairman of the Somerset Quarter Sessions. In 1957, he received an honorary DCL from Durham University.

In 1918, he married Marjorie, younger daughter of late Charles Booth, Sunderland; they had three daughters.
