= John Adolphus =

English barrister and historian

- John Adolphus
- Born: 1768
- Died: 1845 (aged 76–77)
- Occupations: Lawyer, historian

John Adolphus (1768–1845) was an English barrister and historian.

== Life ==
Born 7 August 1768, he was of German background. His grandfather had been domestic physician to Frederick the Great, and wrote a French romance, Histoire des Diables Modernes. His father lived for a time in London supported by a wealthy uncle, who provided the son with education, and sent him at the age of fifteen to be placed in the office of his agent for some estates in St. Kitts. Adolphus returned to London after something over a year, and was articled to an attorney. He was admitted an attorney in 1790, but after a few years began to write.

The success of his history and the influence of Archdeacon William Coxe brought Adolphus into close connection with Henry Addington, then prime minister. Addington put him on a salary, for political services which included electioneering and pamphleteering. He entered the Inner Temple, and in 1807 he was called to the bar.

He joined the home circuit, and devoted himself specially to criminal work. At the Old Bailey he worked his way to the leadership, which he retained for many years. The first of his notable forensic successes was his defence in 1820 of Arthur Thistlewood and the other Cato Street conspirators. Among the cases in which he subsequently distinguished himself were the trials of John Thurtell, James Greenacre, and François Courvoisier.

Within a few weeks of entering his seventy-seventh year, he died on 16 July 1845.

== Works ==
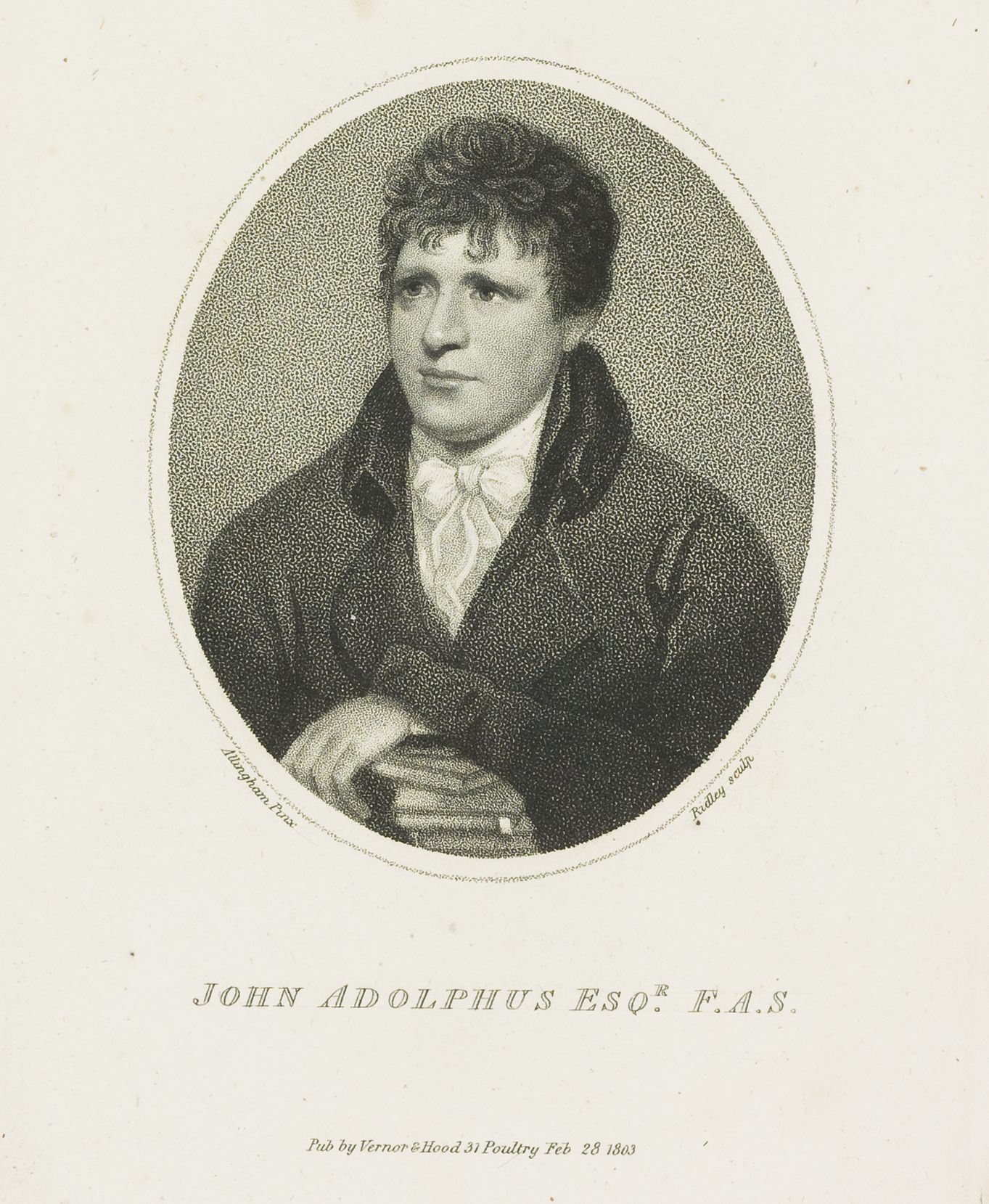
John Adolphus

He wrote Biographical Memoirs of the French Revolution (1799) and History of England from the Accession of George III to the Conclusion of Peace in 1783 (1802), and other historical and biographical works.

He acquired the friendship of Archdeacon Coxe by helping him in the Memoirs of Sir Robert Walpole. In 1799 appeared his first acknowledged work, Biographical Memoirs of the French Revolution, strongly anti-Jacobin in tone, and differing widely from the Biographical Anecdotes of the Founders of the French Republic, published anonymously in 1797, and often erroneously ascribed to Adolphus. He wrote the memoirs in the British Cabinet (1799), a series of portraits of more or less distinguished Englishmen and Englishwomen, from Margaret of Richmond to the second Lord Hardwicke.

In 1802 appeared his major work, the History of England from the Accession of George III to the Conclusion of Peace in 1783. It included summaries of parliamentary debates, and Adolphus was praised for it in issue No. 2 of the Edinburgh Review. The papers of George Dodington, 1st Baron Melcombe had been placed at Adolphus's disposal in the preparation of his history, and they enabled him to throw light on the conduct of Lord Bute, and on the political transactions of the earlier years of the reign of George III, who, in conversation, commented on the accuracy with which some of the first measures taken after his accession had been described.

In 1803 Adolphus published a History of France from 1790 to the Peace of Amiens, and a pamphlet, Reflections on the Causes of the present Rupture with France, in vindication of the policy of the English government. According to his son Adolphus wrote A Letter to Robert Ward, Esq., M.P. (1804), to Robert Ward who had written a defence of William Pitt the Younger in his party quarrel with Addington.

In 1818 he published, in four volumes, The Political State of the British Empire, containing a general view of the domestic and foreign possessions of the crown, the laws, commerce, revenue, offices, and other establishments, civil and military; in 1824, Observations on the Vagrant Act and some other Statutes, and on the Powers and Duties of Justices of the Peace, in the main a protest against some "nanny state" legislation of the time; and in 1839 the Memoirs of John Bannister the actor, whom he had known well.

His history had gone through four editions when, in his seventieth year, Adolphus began the task of continuing it to the death of George III. Vol. I. was re-issued in 1840. Vol. VII., closing with the fall of the Addington administration, appeared in 1845, and Adolphus was working on the eighth volume when he died.

Adolphus wrote several chapters of Charles Rivington's Annual Register and papers for the British Critic. His final contributions to periodical literature were biographical sketches of William Garrow and John Gurney for the Law Magazine. The anonymous Memoirs of Queen Caroline (London, 2 vols., 1824) have been ascribed to him.

== Family ==
In 1793 he married Miss Martha Elizabeth Leycester (1765–1842), daughter of Susanna née Hamner (1740–1805) and the Rev. Ralph Mort Leycester (1737–1803); a lady "of good family and little fortune". Their children were:

- Moses Joseph Adolphus (1790–?) who emigrated to the U.S.
- John Leycester Adolphus (1795–1862) was an English lawyer, jurist and author.
- Susanna Elizabeth Adolphus (1795–?), died young.
- Martha Emilia 'Emily' Adolphus (1798–1884) who married Andrew Henderson (1800–1868) in 1847.

After his death his daughter Emily wrote Recollections of the Public Career and Private Life of the Late John Adolphus The Eminent Barrister and Historian, with Extracts from His Diaries.
