= James Greenacre =

English murderer

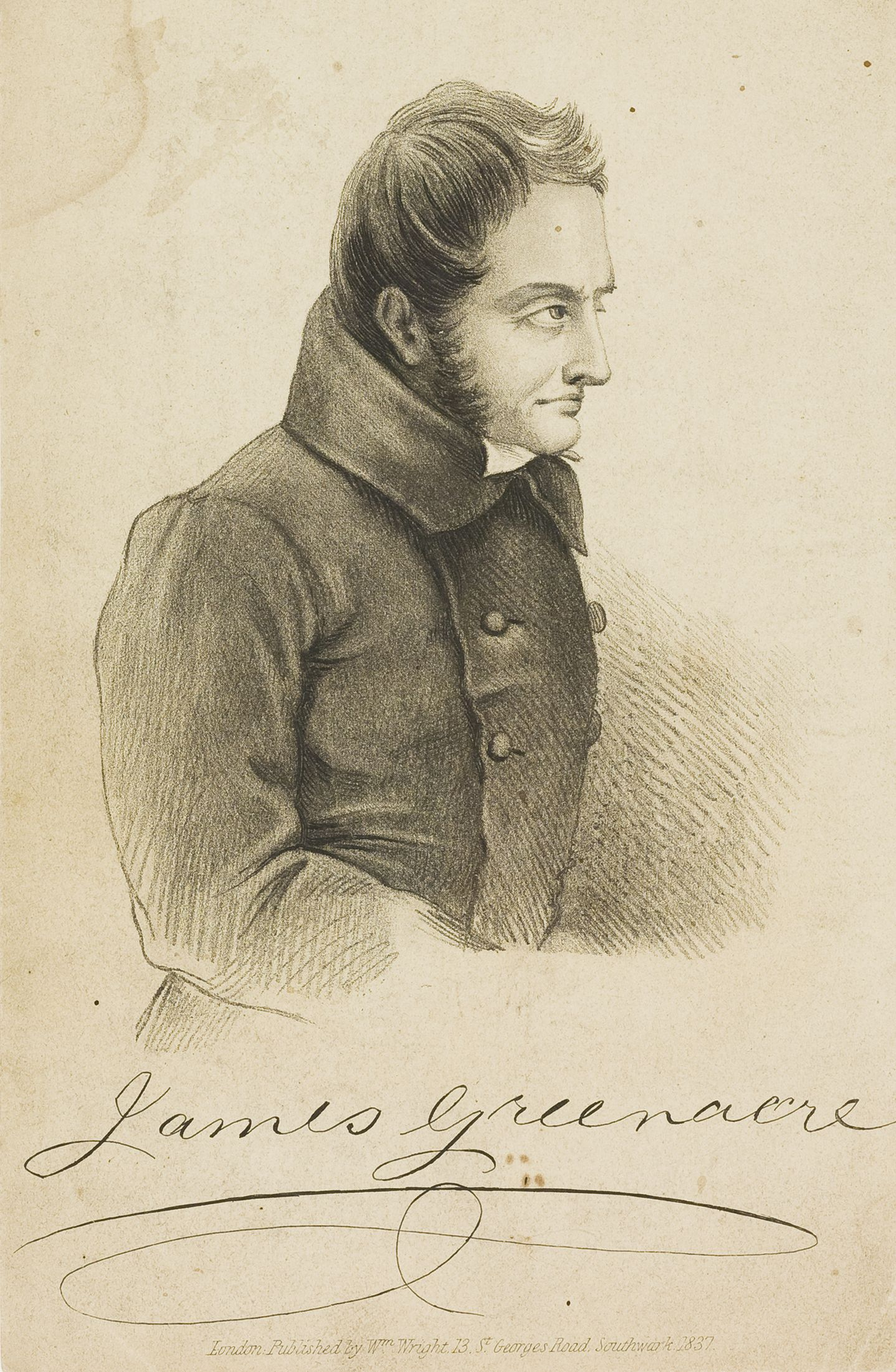
James Greenacre

James Greenacre (1785–1837) was an English grocer and the "Edgware Road Murderer".

== Life ==
In 1836 James Greenacre was living at 2 Carpenter's Place, Camberwell, in London. He presented himself as having property in the United States and a cabinet maker called Evan Davis testified at the trial that Greenacre had claimed to have a farm of around one thousand acres at Hudson Bay. Greenacre also told acquaintances that he was planning on returning to America shortly. Hannah Brown was a middle-aged Englishwoman who lived with her niece at 45 Union Street near the Middlesex Hospital. Her next door neighbour and landlord was John Corney, a shoemaker, and his wife Elizabeth Corney was on friendly terms with Hannah Brown.

Hannah Brown earned her living doing laundry for private customers, and she was known to be a sober, hard working woman. She was estranged from her younger brother and had a sister who, it is believed, worked as a hat maker in Norwich. Greenacre and Brown were engaged to be married at St Giles in the Fields on Christmas Day, 1836, and the banns were read there on 27 November, and on the 4 and 11 December 1836. In preparation for her forthcoming marriage Brown had by 24 December sold her personal property. She told her neighbour Elizabeth Corney that she would not need those things anymore as she was due to leave for America with her husband.

On the afternoon of Saturday 24 December 1836 Hannah Brown said goodbye to Elizabeth Corney. She said that there were still some things in the room that were not hers and she would send back the key in a couple of days when she had retrieved them. Then she got into a Hansom cab with a man that Elizabeth Corney later identified as James Greenacre. The man had helped load some boxes into the cab and although Corney had only seen him once before she testified that the defendant was definitely the man who left with Hannah Brown in the cab.

At two o'clock in the afternoon of Wednesday 28 December James White was in Pineapple Place near the Edgware Road when he noticed a stone slab leaning up against the wall with a bag lying behind it. Drawing closer he noticed that it was not a bag but a sack tied up with string. He sent his assistant, Robert Bond, to find a policeman and in due course police constable S104 Samuel Pegler arrived. (Note: At this time the Metropolitan Police was divided into seventeen divisions, each labelled with a letter of the alphabet. P division was Camberwell, S division was Hampstead, and T division was Kensington.) When the sack was unwrapped it was found to contain the headless and legless torso of a human female. The constable also found a number of rags lying on the ground close to the sack and thinking these might be relevant he placed them in a wheelbarrow with the torso and took them away for further examination.

At trial, a man called Ezekiel Dickens testified that he was a road mender employed on repairing the section of road where the sack had been found. The stone slab had been lifted from the road for repairs and laid against the wall before Christmas. On 24 December he had placed a piece of wood required for the road repair behind the slab, and the sack had not been there at that time.

The sack was identified as the property of Evan Davis, a cabinet-maker and upholsterer, who lived at 45 Bartholomew Close. He was able to identify some holes in the sack made by his children when they were playing with it. Davis had known Hannah Brown for around five years and on learning that she was to be married had offered to host the wedding supper. His work generated significant quantities of wood shavings that he sold to various people, and the sack was identified as the one in which he had sold wood shavings to Hannah Brown. She was in the habit of returning the sack but had not done so on this occasion.

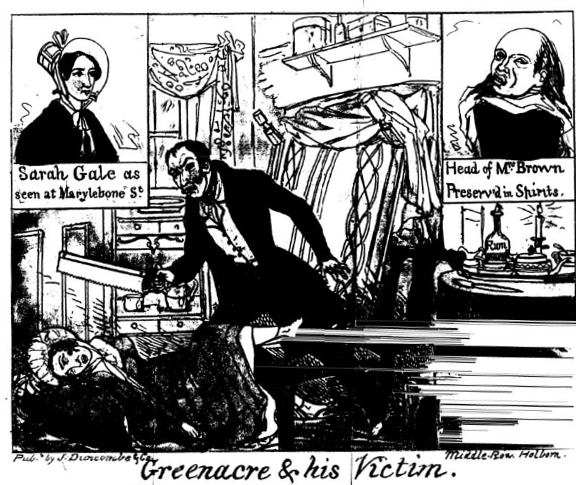
James Greenacre as depicted in a popular transcript of the trial.

At about half past eight in the morning of Friday 6 January 1837, Matthias Ralph, the lock keeper at Johnson's Lock on the Regent's Canal, found that the lock gates would not close. A bargeman told him there was something in the gate so he fetched a hitcher, a long pole with a hook on the end, to see if he could retrieve the obstruction. As he pulled the object out of the water he at first thought it was a dead dog, but on examination it proved to be a human head with long dark hair. Ralph wrapped the head in a cloth and took it to the bone-house. He later testified that one eye was badly damaged, and one ear on the head had been damaged when the person was much younger and this had healed leaving the ear slightly distorted and scarred. He also noticed significant damage to the right side of the lower jaw, which protruded through the skin. At autopsy it was subsequently found that the person had suffered a serious blow to the back of the head. The question of which of these wounds were suffered before or after death was hotly disputed and debated at trial, but all three surgeons who testified were in agreement that the wound by the left eye must have occurred before death.

On Thursday 2 February, James Page, a labourer, was working on an Osier bed in Coldharbour Lane, between Camberwell and Brixton, when he came across a sack among some bushes. There was a hole in the sack and he could see what he took to be part of a human knee. A constable was sent for and another labourer opened the sack and it was found to contain a pair of human legs. Presently police constable P157 William Woodward arrived, and James Page helped carry the evidence to the station-house. Police had already determined that the head and torso belonged to the same person and it did not take them long to match the legs to the other remains.

When Hannah Brown had left her accommodation she said she would return in a couple of days to collect the rest of her things. On 28 December a boy returned with the key but the property had not been collected. John Corney the shoemaker and Hannah Brown's landlord knew that Evan Davis was friends with Hannah Brown and asked him whether he knew where she was. When Evan Davis heard of the head being found in the lock, he put this together with his friend having not been seen for some time and he went along to the poorhouse and identified the head as that of Hannah Brown.

From her childhood Hannah Brown had been friends with a Mrs Blanshard who ran a broker's business in Goodge Street. Hannah's brother William Gay worked for Mrs Blanshard and both of them had been invited to the wedding, though James Greenacre had not realised that William Gay was Hannah Brown's brother. On the evening of 24 December James Greenacre called on Mrs Blanshard to let her know that the wedding was not going ahead as planned. He said that he had learned that Hannah did not have the property she had claimed, and had run up some debts in his name and they had cancelled the wedding. When Mrs Blanshard mentioned that William Gay was Hannah's brother Greenacre turned white and made a hasty retreat.

At this point in the narrative sources disagree on one important point. One version of events is that friends of Hannah Brown "procured a warrant" for the arrest of Greenacre, while other sources claim that a reward was offered for information as to his whereabouts. It is of course possible that both of these are true.

In any event, on Saturday 25 March 1837 Inspector George Feltham of T Division went to Greenacre's new residence in St Alban's Place, Lambeth, to arrest James Greenacre on suspicion of murder and found him there with a woman called Sarah Gale, who had in her possession several items that were later proved to be the property of Hannah Brown. These included a gold watch, some rings, and a pair of cornelian ear rings. She was also holding a pair of receipts from a pawn shop for further items identified as the property of Hannah Brown. A child's dress found at the house was found to have been patched with fabric matching the rags found near the sack containing the torso.

Several of Greenacre's former neighbours in Carpenter's Place were interviewed and stated that Gale had presented herself as Mrs Greenacre since the previous October. Although these neighbours knew the couple were not in fact married they treated them as man and wife and were not aware that Greenacre had any other female friends. A saw and a knife found at Greenacre's residence were found to match the wounds on the head and torso.

The trial at the Central Criminal Court before Chief Judge Sir Nicolas Conyngham Tindal, PC (1776–1846) commencing on Monday 3 April 1837, was prosecuted by John Adolphus (1768–1845), and Sir William Henry Bodkin (1791–1874). The prosecution case was that the marriage offer had always been a sham, that Greenacre had no property or money of his own, that he never had any intention of marrying Hannah Brown, and that the whole affair was a murder scheme premeditated for the specific purpose of obtaining Hannah Brown's money and property, and that after murdering Brown Greenacre intended to escape to America with his accomplice Sarah Gale.

The wound to the back of the head was not visible from the outside and was only discovered at autopsy where there was a noticeable hemorrhage, evidence, the medical men said, that it had been inflicted while the victim was still alive. Whatever blow or fall had caused this could not be responsible for the damage to the eye and the prosecution alleged that this demonstrated that Hannah Brown had been struck in the face from the front, and then fallen backwards against some hard surface. They then speculated that assuming her to be dead, Greenacre had started to dismember the body to hide the evidence.

The prosecution also alleged that Greenacre's inept attempts to dispose of the body were based on his assumption that he would soon be leaving the country. Two of the three parts of the body were left near where men were working and would surely be discovered quite quickly. This, they claimed, showed premeditation, because his escape had been planned in advance.

Three doctors testified at the trial. Mr Gilbert Finlay Girdwood obtained his medical degree at Edinburgh in 1824. At the time of the trial he had been working as a surgeon in Paddington for twelve years, and wrote a textbook on the treatment of Asiatic cholera. He testified that the wounds around the right eye were received before death, and that the other wounds on the head were all received post mortem. In his opinion the initial blow was more likely to have been made with a fist rather than an object, based on the absence of contusion, and significant ecchymosis. He also testified that the first blow would have been sufficiently hard to render a woman, even one as fit and healthy as Hannah Brown, at least temporarily senseless.

Dr. James Hunter Lane (1806–1853), described himself as a Physician, and also lectured on chemistry and forensic medicine. He testified as to the general state of Hannah Brown's health prior to death, the contents of her stomach, the appearance and significance of ecchymosis on the side of the face and around the right eye. His testimony confirmed the good opinions of her friends, that she was abstemious in her habits, hard working, and took good care of herself. He also agreed that the injury to the right eye and almost certainly the incision in her neck were inflicted before death had occurred, though she was probably not conscious at that point.

Dr John Birtwistle was a surgeon at Mile End Hospital. He testified that the wound over the right eye was inflicted before death, and he speculated that the other wounds to the head, particularly the broken jaw and the damage to the left side of the face were caused by attempts to stabilise the head when sawing it off the body. He also stated that the saw produced in evidence was the one used to remove the head, and that the knife in evidence could have produced the other wounds, although he readily agreed that any one of a number of other knives could produce the same result. He also testified that all four parts, the head, torso, and both legs, were part of the same body.

In his defence, Greenacre admitted that he had killed Hannah Brown but that it had been an accident that occurred during an argument about their relative finances. His claim was that only on the eve of their marriage did he discover that she was not as wealthy as she had led him to suppose. This caused the argument when he accidentally hit her with a piece of wood he just happened to have in his hand at the time. He then panicked, because he felt that although he was innocent, he would have some difficulty proving that, so he thought it better to secrete the evidence. The idea of taking Sarah Gale to America only emerged, he claimed, after it became clear that Hannah would not be going with him.

He also said that Sarah Gale had known nothing of Hannah Brown, had played no part in the crime and was not aware that any of the objects found in her possession were the proceeds of crime. The jury took fifteen minutes to decide that Greenacre was guilty of willful murder and that Sarah Gale had knowingly harboured him and attempted to profit from the proceeds of crime. Greenacre was sentenced to be hanged and Gale was transported for life. Newgate Prison produced a death mask of Greenacre, now in the Crime Museum and exhibited to the public at the Museum of London in 2015–2016.

== Bibliography ==
- Peter de Loriol Famous and Infamous Londoners, The History Press 2004
- Brandon & Brooke, London, the Executioner's city, Sutton 2006
- Peter de Loriol Murder and Crime London, The History Press 2010
- Allan Scott-Davies Death on the Waterways, The History Press 2011
- Jan Bondeson The Ripper of Waterloo Road, The History Press 2017
- R. Michael Gordon Murder Files from Scotland Yard and the Black Museum, McFarland 2018
- Honeycombe, Gordon, More Murders of the Black Museum
- http://www.exclassics.com/newgate/ng622.htm
- http://tarlton.law.utexas.edu/lpop/etext/newgate5/greenacre.htm
