= Geoffrey Veale =

English barrister and High Court judge

Sir Geoffrey Veale

Justice of the High Court
- In office 1961 – 29 December 1971

Personal details
- Born: Geoffrey de Paiva Veale; 12 January 1906
- Died: 29 December 1971 (aged 65)
- Education: Rugby College; Oriel College, Oxford

Sir Geoffrey de Paiva Veale (12 January 1906 – 29 December 1971) was an English barrister and High Court judge, who sat in the Queen's Bench Division of the High Court from 1961 until his death in 1971.

== Biography ==
Veale was the son of Dr Henry Veale, of Clifford House, Ilkley. He was educated at Rugby School and Oriel College, Oxford. He was called to the Bar by the Inner Temple in 1929, of which he became a bencher in 1959. Veale joined the Northern Circuit and built a successful practice, most of which was circuit work, although he began to appear more frequently in London courts after he was appointed a King's Counsel in 1951. Outside of the law, Veale was chairman of the Ilkley Urban District Council in 1936.

During the Second World War, Veale served for four years in the Middle East, and was mentioned in dispatches. In 1944 he was promoted to the rank of Colonel and appointed Deputy Judge Advocate General to the British forces in the Middle East.

After the war, Veale held a succession of legal appointments. He was Recorder of Scarborough from 1950 to 1951, Recorder of Sunderland from 1951 to 1954, Recorder of Kingston upon Hull from 1954 to 1957, and Recorder of Leeds from 1957 to 1961. He was also Deputy Chairman of the North Riding of Yorkshire Quarter Sessions from 1949 to 1951 and of the West Riding of Yorkshire Quarter Sessions from 1954 to 1961. He was Solicitor-General of the County Palatine of Durham from 1955 to 1957, and Attorney-General of the County Palatine of Durham from 1957 to 1961. In 1966, Veale was made an honorary LLD by the University of Leeds.

In 1957, Veale was one of the three members of the Bank Rate Tribunal, which was appointed to examine allegations that an increase in Official Bank Rate had been improperly discussed ahead of its public announcement by the Bank of England. The Tribunal unanimously found no basis for the allegations, although some were critical of the Tribunal's conclusions.

Veale was appointed a Justice of the High Court in 1961, received the customary knighthood, and was assigned to the Queen's Bench Division. He sat on the High Court until his death in 1971, aged 65.

Veale married Elizabeth Patricia Barrow in 1937; they had one daughter.
