= Jonny Steinberg =

South African writer and scholar (born 1970)

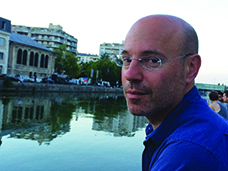
- Steinberg in 2015
- Born: 22 March 1970 (age 56); South Africa
- Education: Wits University; University of Oxford
- Occupations: Writer and scholar
- Writing career
- Notable work: Winnie & Nelson: Portrait of a Marriage (2023)
- Notable awards: National Book Critics Circle Award for Biography; Windham–Campbell Literature Prize; Sunday Times Alan Paton Award; Media24 Books Literary Prize: Recht Malan Prize for Nonfiction

Jonny Steinberg (born 22 March 1970) is a South African writer and scholar.

== Biography ==
Steinberg was born and raised in the northern suburbs of Johannesburg, South Africa. He was educated at Wits University in Johannesburg, and at the University of Oxford, where he was a Rhodes Scholar and earned a doctorate in political theory. He taught for nine years at Oxford, where he was Professor of African Studies. He currently teaches at Yale University's Council on African Studies.

== Books ==
Three of Steinberg's books – Midlands (2002), about the murder of a white South African farmer, The Number (2004), a biography of a prison gangster, and Winnie & Nelson (2023) – won South Africa's premier non-fiction prize, the Sunday Times CNA Literary Awards making him the first writer to win it three times. In 2013, Steinberg was an inaugural winner of the Windham–Campbell Literature Prizes., and in 2024 was awarded the National Book Critics Circle Award for biography.

His books also include Three-Letter Plague (published as Sizwe's Test in the United States), which chronicles a young man's journey through South Africa's AIDS pandemic. It was a Washington Post Book of the Year and was shortlisted for the Wellcome Trust Book Prize. Steinberg is also the author of Thin Blue (2008), an exploration of the unwritten rules of engagement between South African civilians and police, and Little Liberia: An African Odyssey in New York (2011), about the Liberian civil war and its aftermath in an exile community in New York. Writing in The Guardian, Margaret Busby described it as an "extraordinary, stylistically varied mix of reportage, history and biography".

Steinberg's 2015 book, A Man of Good Hope, was described by Observer reviewer Ian Birrell as "an epic African saga that chronicles some fundamental modern issues such as crime, human trafficking, migration, poverty and xenophobia, while giving glimpses into the Somali clan system, repression in Ethiopia and lethal racism in townships". The book was adapted into a stage production by the Isango Ensemble and premiered at the Young Vic in London in 2016.

Steinberg's dual biography of Winnie Madikizela and Nelson Mandela, Winnie & Nelson: Portrait of a Marriage, was published in May 2023. Damon Galgut described it as "a devastating study of modern South Africa", while Hlonipha Mokoena named it "a masterful book that rattles your bones". Richard Stengel, ghostwriter of Nelson Mandela's autobiography, called it "a beautiful and immensely sad book. [...] [Steinberg] gently but firmly removes the masks [Winnie and Nelson] each carefully constructed, only to find other masks underneath." J. M. Coetzee described the book "as deeply sympathetic to Winnie, caught up in the whirlwind of insurrectionary violence, as to Nelson, trapped in his prison cell and losing touch day by day with the evolving situation on the ground". It won the National Book Critics Circle Award for Biography and the Sunday Times Non-fiction Award, making Steinberg the first author to win the prize three times. It was shortlisted for the Los Angeles Times Book Prize for Biography as well as for the Wolfson History Prize. This dual biography was also a Washington Post, New Yorker, Guardian, Times of London, Times Literary Supplement, Spectator and Waterstones Book of the Year.

== Awards and honours ==
- 2003: Recht Malan Prize, shortlist, Midlands
- 2003: South African Booksellers' Choice Award, Midlands
- 2003: Sunday Times Alan Paton Award, Midlands
- 2005: Sunday Times Alan Paton Award, The Number
- 2009: Sunday Times Alan Paton Award, shortlist, Three-Letter Plague
- 2009: Wellcome Trust Book Prize, shortlist, Three-Letter Plague
- 2012: Sunday Times Alan Paton Award, shortlist, Little Liberia
- 2013: Windham–Campbell Literature Prize
- 2015: Johannesburg Book Prize, shortlist, A Man of Good Hope
- 2015: Sunday Times Alan Paton Award, shortlist, A Man of Good Hope
- 2020: Recht Malan Prize, One Day in Bethlehem
- 2023: Los Angeles Times Book Prize for Biography, shortlist, Winnie & Nelson: Portrait of a Marriage
- 2024: National Book Critics Circle Award for Biography, Winnie & Nelson
- 2024: Sunday Times Non-fiction Award, Winnie & Nelson
- 2024: Wolfson History Prize, shortlist, Winnie & Nelson

== Bibliography ==
- Midlands. Johannesburg: Jonathan Ball Publishers, 2002. xii, 259 pages. ISBN 9781868421244
- The Number: One Man's Search for Identity in the Cape Underworld and Prison Gangs. Johannesburg: Jonathan Ball Publishers, 2004. 427 pages. ISBN 9781868422050
- "Nongoloza's Children: Western Cape Prison Gangs During and After Apartheid", Centre for the Study of Violence and Reconciliation, 2004
- Notes from a Fractured Country. Johannesburg: Jonathan Ball Publishers, 2007
- Sizwe's Test. New York: Simon and Schuster, February 2008. Hardcover, 368 pages. ISBN 9781416552697
- Thin Blue: The Unwritten Rules of Policing South Africa. Johannesburg: Jonathan Ball Publishers, August 2008.
- Three-Letter Plague. Johannesburg: Jonathan Ball Publishers, March 2008; Vintage Random House, December 2008
- Little Liberia: An African Odyssey in New York. London: Jonathan Cape Random House, January 2011; Johannesburg: Jonathan Ball Publishers, March 2011
- A Man of Good Hope. London: Jonathan Cape, 2015; ISBN 9780224094122. New York: Knopf, 2015; ISBN 9780385352727
- One Day in Bethlehem. London: Jonathan Ball Publishers, 2019; ISBN 9781868429349.
- Winnie & Nelson. Portrait of a Marriage. London, William Collins, 2023. ISBN 9780008353797
