= Umkosi Wezintaba =

South African criminal resistance group, 1890-1920

Umkhosi Wezintaba ('The Regiment of the Hills'), 'Umkosi we Seneneem' ('The Regiment of Gaolbirds'), 'Abas'etsheni' ('The People of the Stone'), the 'Nongoloza' and the 'Ninevites' were simultaneously criminal gangs and resistance movements formed by native African men in South Africa between 1890 and 1920.

== Umkosi Wezintaba (The Regiment of the Hills), 1812–1899 ==
Nongoloza (born Mzuzephi Mathebula), also known as Jan Note, a Zulu man from Natal, worked for two criminals based on the Witwatersrand, Tyson and McDonald, assisting them with robbing passenger coaches or carts carrying miners' wages. Upon leaving his employers, Note sought out the area's Zulu-speaking thieves and criminals, eventually becoming their leader. Historian Charles van Onselen notes that although Umkosi Wezintaba mainly committed anti-social crimes, the organisation also worked to avenge perceived injustice against its members.

== The Ninevites, 1906–1920 ==
The Ninevites were formed by Mzuzephi 'Nongoloza' Mathebula. Nongoloza was the alias adopted by the young Zulu migrant, who had suffered injustice from his past and longed to break away from it to establish a new era. The Ninevites were a gang consisting of other young South African outlaws searching for sources of income through various criminal activities in Johannesburg. The group of bandits grew across South Africa, and for almost two decades the gang dominated. By 1920 the Ninevites were crushed (Nongoloza was sentenced to prison for attempted murder in 1900).

== Sexuality ==
Nongoloza ordered his troops to abstain from physical contact with females, instead ordering older men of marriageable status within the regiment to take on younger males of the gang as boy wives. Nongoloza testified in 1912 that the practice of hlabonga had "always existed. Even when we were free on the hills south of Johannesburg some of us had women and others had young men for sexual purposes." According to Zackie Achmat, Nongoloza did not justify the existence of taking on boy wives based on venereal diseases or tradition, but in terms of sexual desire.

== See also ==
- Numbers Gang
- Crime in South Africa
