= William McFadzean, Baron McFadzean =

William Hunter McFadzean, Baron McFadzean, KT (17 December 1903 – 14 January 1996) was a British businessman and member of the House of Lords.

Born at Stranraer, McFadzean was educated at Glasgow High School and read accountancy at Glasgow University. He joined the firm of McLay, McAllister and McGibbon in 1922 and moved to Chalmers, Wade & Company in 1927. In 1932 he joined British Insulated Cables at Liverpool, rising to be executive manager in 1942. Following a post-war merger McFadzean became deputy chairman in 1947, and managing director from 1954 to 1961, of British Insulated Callender's Cables. He was also president of the company from 1954 to 1973. He became a friend of Harold Wilson in whose Huyton constituency the company was a major employer.

He was knighted in 1960, made a life peer as Baron McFadzean, of Woldingham in the County of Surrey on 24 June 1966, and a Knight of the Thistle in 1976. A committed pro-European, he made only one speech in the House of Lords, during the debate on Britain's entry into the European Community on 26 July 1971.

McFadzean married Eileen Gordon in 1933 and had three kids, a son, a daughter and one adopted daughter who prededeceased him. He died at Bath.

== Arms ==
Coat of arms of William McFadzean, Baron McFadzean
Crest A lion's gamb Gules grasping a caduceus Or the serpents Vert within an orle of wild flowers Proper. Escutcheon Vert a saltire Argent between in chief a thistle slipped and leaved in base a thunderbolt and in fess two garbs Or banded Gules. Supporters On either side a lion Vert supporting a caduceus Or the serpents Vert. Motto Endeavour
