= List of Solicitors-General of Durham =

This is a list of those who have served as Solicitor-General of County Durham

- 1795–?: Sir Alan Chambre
- bef. 1833–1834: David Francis Atcherley (formerly D.F. Jones)
- 1834–1842: Sir Cresswell Cresswell
- 1855–1862: John Leycester Adolphus
- 1862–1872: John Archibald Russell
- 1872–1878: Joseph Kay
- 1879–1886: Gainsford Bruce
- 1886–1887: John Forbes
- 1887–1901: Edward Tindal Atkinson
- 1901–1905: John Scott Fox
- 1905–1915: Herbert Francis Manisty
- 1915–1921?: Arthur William Bairstow
- 1921?–1930: Henry Arthur Colefax
- 1930–1932: Edward Alfred Mitchell-Innes
- 1932–1939: James Willoughby Jardine
- 1939–1941: Geoffrey Hugh Benbow Streatfeild
- 1946–1947?: Christian Bedford Fenwick
- 1950–1956: Harold Richard Bowman Shepherd
- 1956–1957: Geoffrey de Paiva Veale
- 1957–1961: George Stanley Waller
- 1961–1965: Rudolph Lyons
- 1965–1971: Peter Stanley Price
