= Number (disambiguation) =

A number describes quantity and assesses multitude.

Number, numbers, or The Number may also refer to:

== Mathematics and language ==
- Grammatical number, a morphological grammatical category indicating the quantity of referents
- Number Forms, a Unicode block containing common fractions and Roman numerals
- Nominal number, a label to identify an item uniquely
- Number theory, a mathematical discipline
- Numbering scheme, a method of assigning numbers to items
- Numeral system, a writing system for expressing numbers
- Numeral (linguistics), words or phrases that describe a numerical quantity
- Number sign, a #

== Literature ==
- Book of Numbers, part of the Torah; the fourth book of the Bible
- Number (magazine), a Japanese sports magazine
- Numbers (magazine), a literary magazine published in Cambridge, England
- Numbers: The Universal Language, a 1996 illustrated book by Denis Guedj
- The Number, a book by Jonny Steinberg

== Entertainment ==
- "Numbers" (Lost), an episode of Lost
  - The Numbers (Lost), the numbers 4, 8, 15, 16, 23, 42 in Lost
- Numbers (Nanoha), a group of characters in Magical Girl Lyrical Nanoha StrikerS
- Numbers (TV series) (stylised as Numb3rs), an American TV series
- The Numbers (website), a website that tracks box office revenue and film sales, published by Nash Information Services LLC.
- Numbers monsters, a set of cards in Yu-Gi-Oh! Zexal
- Numbers, a play by Kieron Barry
- Numbers, a character in the Dick Tracy franchise
- A Number, a 2002 play by the English playwright Caryl Churchill
- Numbers, a historic nightclub in the Montrose neighborhood of Houston, Texas
- The Number (film), a 2017 South African film
- Numbers (South Korean TV series), a 2023 television series

=== Music ===
- Number (music)
- Number opera, an opera consisting of individual musical numbers
- Numbers (American band), an American indie rock/electronic group
- The Numbers Band, an American rock group
- The Numbers (band), an Australian rock group
- Numbers (record label), a Scottish record label

==== Albums ====
- Numbers (Cat Stevens album) (1975)
- Numbers (Jason Michael Carroll album), 2011
- Numbers (Roscoe Mitchell album), 2011
- Numbers (Rufus album) (1979)
- Numbers (The Briggs album) (2003)
- Numbers, a 2007 album by Days Difference
- Number(s) (Woe, Is Me album) (2010)
- Numbers (MellowHype album) (2012)

==== Songs ====
- "Numbers", a song by Kraftwerk from the 1981 album Computer World
- "Numbers", a song by Soft Cell from the 1983 album The Art of Falling Apart
- "Numbers", a song by Basshunter from his 2009 album Bass Generation
- "Numbers", a song by Skepta featuring Pharrell Williams from the album Konnichiwa
- "The Numbers", a song by Radiohead from their 2016 album A Moon Shaped Pool
- "Numbers" (song), a song by A Boogie wit da Hoodie from the 2020 album Artist 2.0
- "Numbers", a song by Melanie Martinez from her 2020 deluxe album K–12
- "Numbers", a song by Weezer from their 2021 album OK Human
- "Numbers (I Can Only Count to Four)", a song by Psychostick from their 2011 album Space Vampires vs Zombie Dinosaurs in 3D

== People with the name ==
- Ronald Numbers (1942–2023), an American professor and historian of science

== Other uses ==
- Numbers (spreadsheet), a spreadsheet application developed by Apple as part of its iWork suite
- Number (periodicals), a number to indicate a particular issue of a periodical
- Number (sports), a number assigned to an athlete
- Telephone number or number
- Numbers game, a gambling scheme common in poor U.S. urban neighborhoods
- Numbers station, a spy radio station
- The Numbers Gang, a prison gang in South Africa
- Preferred number or preferred value in industrial design
- Describing something having greater numbness
- Individual Number (個人番号, kojin bangō), or My Number in Japan, is a 12-digit ID number that has been issued to all citizens and residents of Japan since late 2015.

== See also ==
- Category:Numbers
