= List of attorneys-general of Durham =

This is an incomplete list of those who have served as Attorney-General of County Durham:

- 1634-1639 Sir Thomas Tempest
- bef. 1822–1834?: Sir James Scarlett
- 1834?: Sir Frederick Pollock
- 1835–1846? David Francis Atcherley
- 1846–1861: Robert Ingham
- 1861–1866: William Mathewson Hindmarch
- 1866–1868: Stephen Temple
- 1868–1872: John Richard Quain
- 1872–1886: John Bridge Aspinall
- 1886–1887: Gainsford Bruce
- 1887–1901: John Forbes
- 1901–1915: Edward Tindal Atkinson
- 1915–1939: Herbert Francis Manisty
- 1939–1940 James Willoughby Jardine
- 1941–?: Geoffrey Hugh Benbow Streatfeild
- 1950–1957: George Raymond Hinchcliffe
- 1957–1961: Geoffrey de Paiva Veale
- 1961–1965: George Stanley Waller
- 1965–1971: Rudolph Lyons
