= Numbers Gang =

Crime organization in South Africa

- Founded: Late 1880s
- Founding location: Westville, Durban, KwaZulu-Natal
- Years active: 1880s–present
- Territory: All prisons in South Africa
- Ethnicity: Primarily Africans, and a number of Coloureds
- Membership: Thousands
- Criminal activities: Extortion, assault, rape, inmate prostitution, theft, murder, gambling, smuggling, robbery, contract killing, drug trafficking, weapon trafficking

The Numbers Gang is a South African criminal organization believed to be present in most South African prisons. The gang was founded in KwaZulu-Natal. The gang is divided into groups — the 26s, 27s and 28s.

It is one of the oldest crime organizations in the world. It also has complex rules and a defined internal hierarchy, as well as expansive folklore. The gang is largely secretive about such topics as well as its history, leading to a shortage of verifiable information. The Numbers Gang traditionally does not operate outside of prisons.

== History ==
The Numbers Gang is thought to have originated in the late 1800s and is purportedly one of the oldest criminal groups in the world. The exact origins of the gang remain unclear, and much of its early history is uncertain. It operates through three main factions: the 26s, 27s, and 28s. The 26s are responsible for smuggling items like money, tobacco, and drugs into prisons. The 27s enforce the gang's rules and are the most feared group. The 28s focus on protecting prisoners' rights.

In the early 20th century Mzuzephi Mathebula made headlines in the city of Durban by recruiting men to join the 28s whom by that time were also Amalayitha.

== Tale of creation ==
The likely apocryphal story of Nongoloza and Ngeleketyane is seen as the gang's origin by members.

The story says that a man named Paul Mambazo became alarmed by the exploitation of miners in late 1800 South Africa. He then befriended a young Zulu boy called Nongoloza who said he was on his way to the mines to look for work, and Ngeleketyane who was a Pondo. Paul eventually recruited 15 young men. He taught them a secret language and highway robbery. The men robbed travelers and colonial outposts. They moved from cave to cave and split themselves into two groups. Ngeleketyane with seven men who robbed by day, and Nongoloza with six men who robbed by night. Paul ordered the two men to carve their daily outlaw activities on a nearby rock which would serve as a diary.

Paul then ordered the two men to visit a farm, owned by a Mr. Rabie, and to buy one of his bulls called Rooiland (Red Earth). Mr. Rabie was suspicious, and refused to sell the two men the bull. The two youths refused to leave without carrying out their order, and proceeded to stab the farmer with bayonets and then steal the bull, and slaughter it for a feast.

Paul ordered the men to take the hide of the bull and press it onto the diary rock until the words from the rock were imprinted on the hide. There were now two copies of the gang's ways, and Paul explained that the bandits must follow the rules as they had been set out from the beginning. The two items were divided between the two men: Nongoloza received the hide and Ngeleketyani received the rock. The two were instructed to carry them wherever they went. The rock, however, proved too awkward to carry and one day it was accidentally dropped down a hill. It split into two pieces, one of which fell into a river. This left Ngeleketyane's gang with only half of the gang's laws.

The first conflict between the two gangs took place because of this incident. The two gangs decided to embark on a joint expedition, but Nongoloza said he was sick and stayed behind. He asked one of Ngeleketyane's soldiers, Magubane, to stay behind with him. Upon returning, Ngeleketyane found Nongoloza engaged in homosexual acts with Magubane. Enraged, Ngeleketyane challenged Nongoloza to a fight. Nongoloza replied that according to the hide, sex between bandits was allowed in order to avoid contact with women. Ngeleketyane retaliated by saying that he didn't trust Nongoloza, believing he had added this law to the hide after half of the rock was lost. The two men fought until they were both drenched in blood, and Paul arrived to intervene.

Paul listened to both men's sides of the story. He then told Ngeleketyane to travel to the mines to see if men were engaging in sex with one another. Ngeleketyane found that this did indeed take place, but opinions remained divided as to whether this justified Nongoloza's act. This would become the pivotal disagreement between the two gangs that persists to this day. Paul had informed the men that at the entrance of his cave was an old assegai, and if the men found the tip of the assegai rusted, it would mean that Paul had died. Due to the death of Paul, a final decision on whether sexual intercourse between men was allowed never came to pass.

After Paul's death the two gangs decided to go their separate ways: Nongoloza's gang with its now eight men (including Magubane, whom he decided to take with him), and Ngeleketyani's gang with its seven. It is said that this is where the numbers "27" and "28" originated, with the number "2" symbolizing the two leaders. The gangs agree that the day and night would still be divided between them as it had always been. The gangs continued to roam the countryside until they both ended up in Point Prison in Durban.

At Point Prison they encountered a group of six men, led by a man named Grey, who were franse (non-gangsters). The six men would sit in a circle and flip a single silver coin between them. Nongoloza demanded that the men hand over their possessions to him; they refused. Later Ngeleketyane told him that these men were skilled smugglers and gamblers who had helped him in his early days in prison. A fight broke out between Nongoloza and Ngeleketyane about the future of the gamblers. Ngeleketyane defended the gamblers against the 28s' sexual appetites, which was what Nongoloza wanted them for.

After many disagreements Nongoloza finally decided that the new group would be called the "26s" also known as Izisebenzi. This name was chosen because they had six men but also because Nongoloza wanted to indicate their inferior status. Nongoloza informed Ngeleketyane that he and his men would have to answer for the actions of the 26s.

Finally the three camps were formed. The 26s were responsible for gambling, smuggling and accruing wealth in general. The 28s were the warriors and responsible for fighting on behalf of all three groups, and the 27s were the guardians of gang law and the peace keepers between all the gangs.

New rules and a strict code of conduct were drawn up. It was decided that when a gangster broke a rule, the blood of a warder or franse (non-gangster) must be spilled to set things right.

== Gang numbers ==
=== 26s ===
The 26s' duty is to accumulate wealth for all the numbers. The 26s have no private line and a wyfie may not join the gang. Although a member of the 26s may take a wyfie for himself, it is strictly against the laws as set out in the book of 26s. The 26s run all prisons in the province of KwaZulu-Natal and are mostly active in Durban and uMgungundlovu district of Pietermaritzburg.

In the number 2 and the number 1, there is a number 1's and number 2's twelve point ring, for number 4's and 5's, but not 6's or 7's, who have an 11 point ring, unless they are number 8's, which make gang decisions according to their jurisdictions. Each rank has its own assigned office and duties which include training lower rank members in the duties and codes of the gang.

=== 27s ===
The 27s are the most secretive division and they enforce gang law. The members have the most violent behaviour and are said to stab prison guards if ever a member did wrong or must be elevated through the ranks, they swear on blood. All members of the 27 gang are seen as the descendants of Ngeleketyani, a Mpondo man from Mpondoland who was said to have started the Number with his alley at that time in the 1800s. It is believed that there was major conflict between the 26s and 28s and so the 27s were acting as mediators between the two groups.

=== 28s ===
The 28s are the blood line of the gang and are responsible for fighting on behalf of the three gangs (26, 27 and 28). The 28s operate through two distinct internal branches. One, known as the gold line, is responsible for enforcing the gang’s power through violence. The other, called the silver line, revolves around the regimented “wyfie” system, in which younger or physically vulnerable inmates are coerced into sexual subservience as a means of maintaining hierarchy, loyalty, and discipline. The gold line are the warriors, the descendants of Nongoloza. They fight the gang's battles. The silver line are the female, and are the descendants of Magubane. They are considered to be the sex slaves of the gold line. Sexual intimidation and violent initiation serve as central features of the gang's internal culture. The gold line, also known as the blood line, is responsible for enforcing the gang’s power through violence, while the silver line, also other, called the sex line, revolves around the regimented “wyfie” system, in which younger or physically vulnerable inmates are coerced into sexual subservience as a means of maintaining hierarchy, loyalty, and discipline.

== Relationships ==
=== Relationship between the numbers ===
The two 28s are not allowed to speak directly to the 26s. They communicate through the 27s. When the 28s recruit a new member, the 28s inform the 27s who then inform the 26s. This is seen as a "hands off" warning to the other gangs.

== Relationships with franse (non gang members) ==
The numbers gangs refer to themselves as ndodas (men) and refer to non-gang members as franse. The franse are stripped of their juridical personhood. He is not seen as a human to the gangs. The numbers gangs then engage in homosexual relationships with the franse. The franse must submit everything they have to the ndodas, but the franse are protected from the numbers by being housed in different cells.

=== Relationship with warders ===
The relationship between gang members and the warders is a complex and an uneasy one. Under the apartheid regime they feared the warders. They knew that the warders would not be watched by human rights groups, so when there was a stabbing of an officer the warders would retaliate, violently.

Under the new system, however, the warders have become targets. The numbers gangs are well aware that the consequences of their actions will not result in a beating or the death penalty, and therefore new initiates are encouraged to assault wardens.

One of the most compelling messages that the numbers gang members like to send to the warders is by holding up a mirror toward the warden. This derives from the traditional practice of holding up an image of an inmate. The message the numbers are said to be sending is, "We are what you are. You are an army, we are an army. Where you have a head of the prison, we will have a judge. Where you have a head of a section, we will have a general. Whatever you do to us, we will do to you in turn."

== The numbers network ==
One notable feature of the numbers gang is that it is a nationwide brotherhood that is prevalent in prisons across South Africa.

Members that betray the gang are not safe in almost any South African prison, as the numbers control all but a few prisons in South Africa. The secretive nature of the gang makes their system of communicating with other prisons unknown.

== General elections ==
Traditionally the 28 gang has been the dominant gang in Western Cape prisons. This still holds true in prisons such as Pollsmoor prison. However, the balance of power now varies from prison to prison over time. When one of the number gangs feels it can take control of the prison, they declare a "general election" in which an all-out war is waged, often lasting up to two years, until one gang is declared the "ruling party". Two famous cases of these wars were in Belville prison (1967–1969) and in Brandvlei prison (1974–1976). In both cases the 26s were declared the "ruling party".

== Evolution of leadership structure in the 28s gang ==
The 28s prison gang is undergoing a transformation in its leadership structure following significant events since 2023. Traditionally, joining the gang required a lengthy initiation process, however, the death of a former leader in 2023 has disrupted these norms.

== See also ==
- Umkosi Wezintaba

== Information sources ==
- «God’s children», Heather Parker Lewis, 2006 – ISBN 978-1-920103-11-8
- «Nongoloza's Children: Western Cape Prison Gangs During and After Apartheid», Jonny Steinberg
- Van Zyl Smit, Dirk "South African prison law and practice", Butterworths, 1992
- Durban. Haysom, N. (1981). Towards an understanding of prison gangs Institute of Criminology, University of Cape Town. Cape Town
