= Federation of British Industries =

The Federation of British Industries (FBI) was an employers' association in the United Kingdom.

== History ==
Founded by the Midlands industrialist Dudley Docker in 1916 as the United British Industries' Association, but renamed later that same year, it was initially composed of 124 firms which each gave £1,000 for its foundation. The FBI never took part in labour relations but was progressively involved in tariff reform. It slowly gathered other regional and overseas organisations and was incorporated by Royal Charter in 1923.

In 1965, it merged with the British Employers' Confederation and the National Association of British Manufacturers to form the Confederation of British Industry. It was by far the biggest organisation of the three, composed of about 9,000 individual firms and 272 trade associations by 1964.

== Presidents ==
Presidents included:

- Sir Vincent Caillard (1919)
- Sir Peter Rylands (1919–1921)
- Oliver Carleton Armstrong (1921–1922)
- Sir Eric Geddes (1923–1925)
- Vernon Willey, 2nd Baron Barnby (1925-1926)
- Sir Max Muspratt (1926–1927)
- Lord Gainford (1927–1928)
- Lord Ebbisham (1928–1929)
- Lennox B. Lee (1929–1930)
- Sir James Lithgow (1930–1932)
- Sir George Beharrell (1932–1933)
- Sir George Macdonogh (1933–1934)
- Lord Herbert Scott (1934–1935)
- Sir Francis Joseph (1935–1936)
- Lord Hirst (1936–1937)
- Peter Bennett (1938–1940)
- Lord Dudley Gordon, 3rd Marquess of Aberdeen and Temair (1940-1943)
- Sir George Nelson (1943–1944)
- Sir Clive Baillieu (1945–1947)
- Sir Frederick Bain (1947–1949)
- Sir Robert Sinclair (1949–1951)
- Sir Archibald Forbes (1951–1953)
- Sir Harry Pilkington (1953–1955)
- Sir Graham Hayman (1955–1957)
- Sir Hugh Beaver (1957–1959)
- Sir William McFadzean (1959–1961)
- Sir Cyril Harrison (1961–1963)
- Sir Peter Runge (1963–1965).

Directors (later retitled director-general) included:

- Sir Roland Nugent from 1916 to 1917 and 1919 to 1932
- Sir Guy Locock from 1932 to 1945
- Sir Norman Kipping from 1946 to 1965
