= Nummi =

Nummi or NUMMI may refer to:

- NUMMI (New United Motor Manufacturing, Inc.), a defunct automobile manufacturing company in Fremont, California, United States
  - Tesla Factory (Gigafactory 0), the reused NUMMI factory building, sometimes still called "NUMMI"
- Nummi (Uusimaa), a former municipality (in the Finnish province of Uusimaa, in Finland) which merged with Pusula municipality into Nummi-Pusula municipality on January 1, 1981.
- Nummi-Pusula, a former municipality of Finland between 1981 and 2012, which ceased to exist on 1 January 2013, when the municipalities of Nummi-Pusula and Karjalohja merged with Lohja.
- Nummi (Turku), a district in Turku (in the province of Southwest Finland)
- Nummus (plural: nummi), a Latin term meaning "coin"
- Ron Nummi, American actor

== See also ==
- Numi (disambiguation)
