= List of Knights of Sidonia characters =

This is a list of the characters from the manga and anime series Knights of Sidonia by Tsutomu Nihei.

== Main characters ==
Nagate Tanikaze (谷風 長道, Tanikaze Nagate)
Voiced by: Ryōta Ōsaka (Japanese); Johnny Yong Bosch (English)
The series main protagonist, who was raised by his grandfather Hiroki Saitō deep inside Sidonia, thus he did not undergo the special genetic treatment to develop the ability to sustain himself through photosynthesis and must eat on a daily basis like a regular human for nutrition. Later it is revealed he is actually Saitō's clone, inheriting not only engineered features like fast wound recovery and immortality, but also Saitō's natural talent as a pilot and warrior. Trained since childhood on a Garde simulator, Nagate is entrusted with Saitō's Garde, the legendary Type-17 "Tsugumori" (継衛), and just like his "grandfather," he eventually becomes Sidonia's top ace, saving the ship from the Gauna invasion on several occasions. Nagate later is entrusted with most advanced units, like the first prototype of Sidonia's Type-19, an upgraded version of Tsugumori, the "Tsugumori Custom 2" (継衛改二, Tsugumori kai ni), and the first prototype of Sidonia's Type-20, labeled "Yukimori" (劫衛). Initially assigned the call number TS-028, he is later designated unit 704 when he is promoted to full pilot status. Nagate later fathers a child with Tsumugi, whose consciousness now resides in one of the captured Crimson Hawk Moth samples, after Sidonia defeats the Large Mass Union Ship and colonizes the Lem star system.
Shizuka Hoshijiro (星白 閑, Hoshijiro Shizuka)
Voiced by: Aya Suzaki (Japanese); Stephanie Sheh (English)
A fellow Garde pilot, ranked number two among the trainees, who Nagate meets and becomes his love interest. Initially assigned to call number TS-336, she is assigned to unit 702 when she is promoted to full pilot. She is later killed and absorbed by Gauna 490, which uses her DNA and memories to develop a powerful Garde-like Gauna known as Crimson Hawk Moth (紅天蛾, Benisuzume). A placenta sample resembling her is also retrieved by Nagate, and Ochiai impregnates it using human DNA to create Tsumugi and Kanata.
Tsumugi Shiraui (白羽衣 つむぎ, Shiraui Tsumugi)
Voiced by: Aya Suzaki (Japanese); Stephanie Sheh (English)
A Gauna/human hybrid created by Kunato Developments for fighting against the Gauna. Tsumugi is similar in size to a Garde, but has a Gauna-like appearance in the shape of a young woman wearing a dress. Tsumugi eventually becomes friends with Nagate and Izana, usually interacting with them using a tentacle she sneaks in through the ship's ventilation system while the rest of her body stays in her chambers. Tsumugi displays a gentle, curious, child-like demeanor under most circumstances, but her prowess in combat is rivaled only by Nagate's. Just like Shizuka, she eventually develops feelings for Nagate and much to her surprise, he ends up accepting them, despite her inhuman form. Tsumugi is equipped with an organic artificial kabi cannon and retractable claws made of artificial kabi. She also has a hollow chest cavity holding an organic cockpit that allows a pilot to direct and support her in battle. Tsumugi naturally generates Heigus particles within her body and is able to easily out-fly even the most advanced Garde models. Tsumugi eventually sacrifices her hybrid body to rescue Nagate from the Lem star after his battle with Chimera Ochiai, using her body as shield to protect him from the heat. Her consciousness is later transferred to one of the captured Hoshijiro-like Gauna samples from the Crimson Hawk Moths and she enters a true relationship with Nagate, eventually giving birth to a daughter, Nodoka (長閑). According to Tsumugi, Hoshijiro's memories still reside within her new body, though they are vague.
Izana Shinatose (科戸瀬 イザナ, Shinatose Izana)
Voiced by: Aki Toyosaki (Japanese); Melissa Fahn (English)
Belonging to an intersex third gender that originated during the hundreds of years of human emigration into space, Izana is also a Garde pilot and quickly becomes Nagate's best friend and eventual roommate, later falling in love with him. This attraction causes Izana's body to undergo a transformation into that of a female. Izana loses an arm and a leg during a battle against the Gauna and has them replaced with prosthetic limbs that allow her to operate complex machinery with far more skill than an ordinary person. A system is also installed on Izana's Garde unit that funnels sensor and radar information directly into her brain via her artificial arm, granting her unparalleled detection abilities surpassing even Sidonia's systems. She is often assigned to recon and spotting duties in battle. Initially TS-291, Izana is later assigned to unit 723. Ten years after the destruction of the Large Mass Union Ship and Sidonia's colonization of the Lem star system. Izana is one of several crew members to depart on a repaired Sidonia to parts unknown.
Yuhata Midorikawa (緑川 纈, Midorikawa Yuhata)
Voiced by: Hisako Kanemoto (Japanese); Marieve Herington (series), Jad Saxton (Love Woven in the Stars) (English)
A friend of Nagate and Izana, who later develops feelings for Nagate and competes with Izana for his attention. Initially a Garde pilot in-training with the call number TS-256, Yuhata is promoted to commander's aide after Seii returns to full-time piloting duty, eventually moving into Nagate's home. Yuhata makes a hobby of building and customizing plastic model kits of Garde units in a spare time. Ten years after Sidonia colonizes the Lem star system, Yuhata becomes commander of a repaired Sidonia, which continues on in search of more planets to colonize.
Teruru Ichigaya (市ヶ谷 テルル, Ichigaya Teruru)
A gynoid developed with the purpose of avoiding detection from the Gauna, she is the sole survivor of a colonization expedition on the planet Lem VII. Despite refusing Nagate's help, claiming that he is responsible for the Gauna attacking Sidonia, she is rescued by him nonetheless and, without a place to return to, she is taken under his guard. Teruru claims to be unconcerned towards Nagate, but her actions usually imply otherwise. She later joins the war effort as the pilot of one of Sidonia's new Mizuki-class warships. Her body has a special automatic defense mechanism built in, which activates when she feels threatened or flustered. This causes her artificial skin to harden, leaving her with a more robotic, puppet-like appearance. Being a machine, Teruru is able to survive in the vacuum of space without support, even if her body is severely damaged. Teruru is one of several crew members who decide to stay on the repaired Sidonia, departing to search for more planets to colonize.

== Garde pilots ==
Norio Kunato (岐神 海苔夫, Kunato Norio)
Voiced by: Takahiro Sakurai (Japanese); Todd Haberkorn (English)
A fellow male Garde pilot with long white hair, heir of Kunato Developments, the company developing the Type-18 Gardes that currently compose the majority of Sidonia's main force. Norio ranked first during pilot training and had little respect for other trainees, developing a rivalry with Nagate given the special treatment he receives, unaware of his background or circumstances. He is initially assigned the call number TS-001, and is later assigned to unit 701 before becoming unable to pilot out of anxiety from guilt for directly causing Hoshijiro's death. His body is later taken over by Ochiai's mind and discarded once Ochiai's plan to transfer his mind to Kanata's body is complete. Norio barely survives, albeit with no memories of his time under Ochiai's control, and becomes a pilot once more. Having trained on a Tsugumori combat simulator since childhood just like Nagate, Kunato is entrusted with the Tsugumori Custom 2 after Nagate receives the more advanced Yukimori. Kunato is one of several crew members to stay on Sidonia once it is repaired.
Eiko Yamano (山野 栄子, Yamano Eiko)
Voiced by: Nanako Mori (Japanese); Karen Strassman (English)
A brown-haired female Garde pilot with the call number TS-290, Yamano is hostile and curt towards Nagate and is similarly cold and unfriendly towards her other squadmates. Yamano is in Nagate's squad during his first mission outside Sidonia and is quickly killed by the target Gauna, making her the first Gauna-related death in a century. Said Gauna takes on her form, causing much distress for her squadmates and causing Nagate to experience recurring nightmares until he eliminates the Gauna.
Mochikuni Akai (赤井 持国, Akai Mochikuni)
Voiced by: Soma Saito (Japanese); Grant George (English)
Leader of the Akai squad and designated unit 001. He was the youngest Gravity Cup winner and held it for 13 successive cups. Akai is killed along with his entire squad, including his girlfriend and Yuhata's older brother, during a Gauna attack on Sidonia.
Hinata Momose (百瀬 日向, Momose Hinata)
Voiced by: Hiromi Igarashi (Japanese); Becca Ordonez (English)
Mochikuni Akai's girlfriend and member of his squad, designated unit 002. She is killed during a battle against Gauna 487.
Kashiwade Aoki (青木 柏手, Aoki Kashiwade)
Voiced by: Shinobu Matsumoto (Japanese); Steve Heiser (English)
Member of the Akai squad and designated unit 003. He is killed during a battle against Gauna 487.
Izumo Midorikawa (緑川 出雲, Midorikawa Izumo)
Voiced by: Yuto Suzuki (Japanese); Doug Erholtz (English)
Yuhata Midorikawa's older brother and a member of the Akai squad, designated unit 004. He is killed during a battle against Gauna 487.
Ittan Samari (サマリ イッタン, Samari Ittan)
Voiced by: Atsuko Tanaka (Japanese); Cindy Robinson (English)
Leader of the Samari squad and designated unit 005. A senior pilot and the original test pilot for the Type-19, before it was reassigned to Nagate due to an emergency. She is the highest ranked pilot following the deaths of the Akai squad, usually acting as field commander during missions. It is implied that Samari enters a relationship with Seii following the colonization of the Lem system.
Tonami (土浪)
Member of the original Samari squad and designated unit 006. He is killed during a battle against Gauna 492 when a Heigus particle blast is reflected back.
Kōichi Tsuruuchi (弦打 攻市, Tsuruuchi Kōichi)
Voiced by: Kōsuke Toriumi (Japanese); Spike Spencer (English)
Leader of the Tsuruuchi squad and former member of the Samari squad, designated unit 007. A running gag is Tsuruuchi making advances on Samari just to be rejected by her with comic results. During the fight against Chimera Ochiai, Tsuruuchi sacrifices himself in an attempt to take it down. He is later discovered alive, albeit severely injured, and manages to eventually make a full recovery.
Ichirō Seii (勢威 一郎, Seii Ichirō)
Voiced by: Tomohiro Tsuboi (Japanese); Joey Lotsko (English)
Leader of the Seii squad and designated unit 026, Seii is initially assistant commander before passing his post to Yuhata Midorikawa. Seii is one of the more serious and experienced Garde pilots. In the manga, Seii wears a distinctive vintage helmet that covers most of his face. Seii is the one who initially spreads the rumor about Samari photosynthesizing with male pilots who rack up high kill counts to boost pilot morale. It is implied that he eventually enters a relationship with Samari and fathers several children.
Dō Imada (今田)
Leader of the Imada squad (Nakazono squad in the anime), designated unit 139. He is killed along with his squadmates units 011, 217, and 312 during the initial battle against the Crimson Hawk Moth.
Tōtarō Yamano (山野 稲汰郎, Yamano Tōtarō)
Eiko Yamano's younger brother, he becomes a Garde pilot and Kunato's wingmate to avenge his sister's death. Tōtarō is later hailed as a war hero for being the one to deliver the killing shot to the Large Mass Union Ship's True Body, destroying it once and for all.

== Honoka sisters ==
Several identical clone sisters who pilots Gardes, they are chronologically five years old and have undergone accelerated growth and compressed mental training. So far twenty-two Honokas have been created, in two batches of eleven. All of the Honoka sisters possess enhanced physical strength and agility, able to leap vast distances effortlessly and cause heavy damage to objects with simple punches and kicks. Their given names are all characters that reference fire.

Voiced by: Eri Kitamura (Japanese); Cristina Vee (English)
En Honoka (仄 焔, Honoka En)
Oldest of the Honoka sisters, she is initially assigned the call number TS-203 and is later designated unit 703. She is critically injured in the battle against Gauna 488, the same battle Shizuka was killed in, remaining in a coma for several months. En holds some distaste for Nagate, thinking he is a pervert for walking in on her and her sisters naked more than once. She also blames him for the accident that injured her.
Hō Honoka (仄 烽, Honoka Hō)
Pilot of unit TS-205, then unit 705. She is killed in a battle against the Crimson Hawk Moth.
Ren Honoka (仄 煉, Honoka Ren)
Pilot of unit TS-206, then unit 706, she befriends Nagate after he helps her avenge Hō by defeating the Crimson Hawk Moth with a heavy mass bullet she saved for the occasion. She and En are often found together, with Ren being the more polite and level-headed of the two, especially where Nagate is involved. Ren defends En's behavior by stating that because of the way the Honokas are raised, they are immature despite being physically teenagers and have difficulty controlling their emotions.
Ro Honoka (仄 炉, Honoka Ro)
Pilot of unit 707.
Yō Honoka (仄 燿, Honoka Yō)
Pilot of unit 708.
Shō Honoka (仄 炒, Honoka Shō)
The youngest of the Honoka sisters from the second batch of eleven, considered the most skilled pilot among them. She is killed and absorbed by the Gauna during an expedition to the Lem star. The Gauna that takes her form believes it truly is Shō and possesses her memories and personality. It soon emerges from the Gauna cluster and is revealed to be a giant. This revelation causes the Gauna to break down and destabilize, losing its Shō form just before it is swiftly eliminated by the Mizuki battleship.

The remaining Honoka sisters consist of Baku (爆), Kō (煌), Tō (燈), Ou (燠), Ryō (燎), Sen (煽), Kun (燻), Rin (燐), Sui (燧), Kei (炯), Nen (燃), Sō (燥), Shoku (燭), Shi (熾), Raku (烙), and Kan (燗).

== Immortal crew members ==
Captain Kobayashi (小林艦長, Kobayashi-kanchō)
Voiced by: Sayaka Ohara (Japanese); Wendee Lee (English)
The mysterious female captain of Sidonia, who commands the Gardes against the Gauna's attacks. She wears a mask in public to hide her emotions and the fact that she is ageless. She was formerly a Garde pilot and friends with Nagate's grandfather, becoming his legal guardian after he emerges from the underworks. Kobayashi cares about Nagate, but is forced by the Immortal Ship Committee to assign him to all missions available, which many see as a death sentence due to the low survival rate of pilots after successive sorties. This is actually the Committee's intention, as they want Nagate to be killed before someone discovers his natural immortality. After the Immortal Ship Committee attempts to impeach and replace her, Kobayashi orders their deaths instead, assuming full control of the ship to pool its resources on the war against the Gauna without questioning. Kobayashi has a habit of spending her off time blending in with the general population, made easier by the fact that only a select few people actually know what she looks like under her mask. After the assault on the Large Mass Union Ship, Kobayashi discards her mask for good. She later elects to stay on Lem VII once it is colonized, passing command of the repaired Sidonia to Yuhata Midorikawa.
Hiroki Saitō (斎藤 ヒロキ, Saitō Hiroki)
Voiced by: Rikiya Koyama (Japanese); Michael McConnohie (English)
Nagate's 'grandfather' who also taught Nagate how to pilot Gardes. Saitō was Sidonia's former ace pilot who saved the ship from being overrun by the Gauna 100 years before the events of the series. This was accomplished by retrieving and using the Kabizashi that Ochiai had discarded. After the battle, Saitō disappeared, just to reappear 80 years later, with his body growing old after renouncing his immortality, as he chose to die naturally. Several advanced immortal clones were grown from his DNA and when Saitō learned that the clones grown for him were going to have his memories implanted on them, he stole one of the infants and raised him by himself as a regular child, who would grow up as Nagate Tanikaze. He also taught Nagate all his piloting expertise before dying.
Yure Shinatose (科戸瀬 ユレ, Shinatose Yure)
Voiced by: Mamiko Noto (Japanese); Becca Ordonez (English)
Izana's grandmother and an immortal crew member. Dr. Shinatose was the scientist who devised the plan to repopulate Sidonia with genetically engineered clones after its population was devastated and almost decimated in the Fourth Defensive War against the Gauna. The survivors included 25 council members and 392 citizens. Dr. Shinatose's plan would increase Sidonia's population to 500,000 in 100 years (six generations), while accounting for the lost food production facilities by genetically altering its future population to photosynthesize, reducing the need to consume food to once per week. Dr. Shinatose later oversaw the development of the Gauna/human hybrid Tsumugi. Yure is among the crew members who colonize Lem VII.
Lala Hiyama (ヒ山 ララァ, Hiyama Rarā)
Voiced by: Satomi Arai (Japanese); Barbara Goodson (English)
A talking bear who serves as "dorm mother," taking care of Nagate's living quarters and making his food until he starts living by himself. Hiyama, a member of the original Immortal Ship Committee, was formerly a Garde pilot and served with Kobayashi and Saitō, with whom she participated in the exploration mission to an alien artifact where the Kabizashi were first discovered 600 years before the start of the series. Her bear body is actually an advanced cybernetic life support suit that sustains her human body, which is severely deteriorated due to being subjected to a severe Gauna infection, leaving only her brain unscathed. It is unknown why the suit looks like a bear, though during a flashback, she is seen in an earlier model resembling a bulky diving suit. Hiyama's right hand was lost sometime in the past and was replaced with a three-fingered mechanical claw, though it does not hinder her in any way. She strongly dislikes being addressed by her given name and only ever gave the privilege to Saitō, violently attacking anyone else who addresses her as Lala. As she sees Saitō and Nagate as one and the same, Nagate is the only other person who can get away with calling her Lala. Hiyama is possibly a nod to Nihei's manga Biomega, which features a supporting character named Kozlov, who is also a bear missing a hand. After the war, Hiyama decides to stay on Sidonia as it departs from Lem-VII in search for more planets to colonize.
Ochiai (落合)
Voiced by: Takehito Koyasu (Japanese); Pete Sepenuk (English)
The series' major antagonist, he is a scientist and researcher on the Gauna's behavior and biology who once discarded all of Sidonia's Kabizashi, certain that it attracts the Gauna to them, but this has not stopped the ship from being attacked and almost overrun by the aliens. He escaped execution because a large part of Sidionia's data was transferred to a separate database that can only be accessed through his brain, thus his memories were sealed and his brain transferred to a clone of his. However, a copy of his memories was stored in a separate location and later transferred to Kunato's body, allowing him to resume his research, leading to the advent of Tsumugi and Kanata. Ochiai finally reveals himself when he transfers his memories to Kanata's body, assuming control of the Chimera and leaving Sidonia, believing that the Gauna are a superior life form. Chimera Ochiai later reappears during the assault on the Large Mass Union Ship, intending to gather enough Heigus particles to use his organic Gravitational Beam Emitter and destroy Sidonia. He is eventually killed within the Lem star by Nagate.

== Other characters ==
Numi Tahiro (田寛 ヌミ, Tahiro Numi)
Voiced by: Rina Satō (Japanese); Reba Buhr (English)
A female scientist working in the Extraterrestrial Research Division (ERD) studying the Gauna and assigned to research a human-like sample extracted by Nagate. One observation she has regarding the Hoshijiro ena is that it always looks in the direction of the Kabizashi, this information is immediately classified. She is later put under mind control by Ochiai and put to work under him until she is forced to kill herself upon being questioned by her research on the Gauna.
Sasaki (佐々木)
Voiced by: Takako Honda (Japanese); Cindy Robinson (English)
Head of Toha Heavy Industries (東亜重工, Tōa Jūkō) R&D. A tall and imposing woman with a ponytail. She has a fearsome reputation and usually reprimands Nagate for bringing back his Garde damaged. Sasaki is among the crew members to colonize Lem VII.
Shinsuke Tanba (丹波 新輔, Tanba Shinsuke)
Voiced by: Osamu Saka (Japanese); Michael Sorich (English)
A Toha mechanic. Made redundant after Kunato began production of Type-18 as there were no need for hand-crafted parts. His works are requested again upon the development of the more refined Type-19. He also is responsible for the maintenance of Teruru's artificial body.
Mozuku Kunato (岐神 海蘊, Kunato Mozuku)
Voiced by: Ayane Sakura (Japanese); Erin Fitzgerald (English)
Kunato's 'sister' who is killed and restored by Ochiai after he possesses the body of her brother, brainwashing her to take part on his plans. The brainwashed Mozuku participates into some battles piloting Tsumugi, before the Chimera becomes confident enough to sortie without assistance. Her original personality is eventually restored and she elects to remain on Sidonia once it is repaired.
Crimson Hawk Moth (紅天蛾, Benisuzume)
Voiced by: Aya Suzaki (Japanese); Stephanie Sheh (English)
Also known by the official designations Gauna 489, Gauna 490, and Gauna 491, the "Crimson Hawk Moths" are a trio of powerful and persistent Gauna that initially take the form of red, organic copies of Shizuka Hoshijiro's Garde, unit 702, possessing the same specifications as a Type-18 unit down to the ability to transmit radio messages over Hoshijiro's frequency. In the first encounter against the trio, Gauna 489 is destroyed, while Nagate is able to retrieve a piece of Gauna 491's placenta, which is a near perfect copy of Hoshijiro, possessing simple, infantile intelligence and wearing an organic "suit." Gauna 491 is eventually taken by Ochiai (inhabiting Kunato's body), impregnated, and used to create the Chimeras Kanata and Tsumugi, evidently dying in the process. Gauna 490 continues to pursue and attack Sidonia several times, eventually evolving into a form resembling a giant, biomechanical Hoshijiro and doing battle with Nagate and Tsumugi in the planet Lem IX's atmosphere. True Body of Gauna 490 is eventually destroyed in close combat by Nagate, and its placenta, having invaded Nagate's cockpit during the battle and again resembling Hoshijiro, is recovered and placed in storage. Tsumugi's consciousness is later transferred to one of the captured samples, overwriting what little remained of Hoshijiro's personality.
Kanata (かなた)
A second Gauna/Human hybrid, far more powerful than Tsumugi, but mentally unstable. Instead of being destroyed, she was put into sleep, as Captain Kobayashi is interested in the Gravitational Beam Emitter, a powerful long range weapon installed on her right eye that could help Sidonia get rid of the Gauna threat for good. Once the weapon is mass produced, Kobayashi gives orders to dismantle Kanata, but its body is hijacked by Ochiai. Nagate eventually destroys Kanata's body along with Ochiai's consciousness during a battle within the Lem star's corona.
Ryōko Takahashi (高橋 亮子, Takahashi Ryōko)
Voiced by: Charmaine Tan (Japanese); Erin Fitzgerald (English)
An Aide Controller whose face is always covered by a mask.
