= British Employers' Confederation =

The British Employers' Confederation (BEC), formerly the National Confederation of Employers' Organisations (NCEO), was an employers' association in the United Kingdom.

It had its origins in the Employers' Advisory Council established in 1917 to consider the issue of industrial and labour relations. The Federation of British Industries had originally been a member of the council, but concentrated on all issues apart from industrial relations and left the council in 1919. The council was renamed the National Confederation of Employers' Organisations in March 1919 and the British Employers' Confederation in 1939. A major constitutional difference between the BEC and the FBI was that only employers' organisations could join the BEC rather than individual businesses and firms.

In June 1922, the NCEO moved into new offices at Millbank House in London.

In 1965, it merged with the Federation of British Industries and the National Association of British Manufacturers to form the Confederation of British Industry.
