= National Association of British Manufacturers =

The National Association of British Manufacturers (NABM), formerly the National Union of Manufacturers (NUM), was an employers' association in the United Kingdom.

Founded in 1915 as the British Manufacturers' Association (BMA), it was renamed the National Union of Manufacturers in 1917 and the National Association of British Manufacturers in 1961. It was particularly strong among small and middle-sized firms. It merged with the Federation of British Industries and the British Employers' Confederation in 1965 to form the Confederation of British Industry.
