= Northern Circuit =

Administrative division of the Bar Council and English judiciary

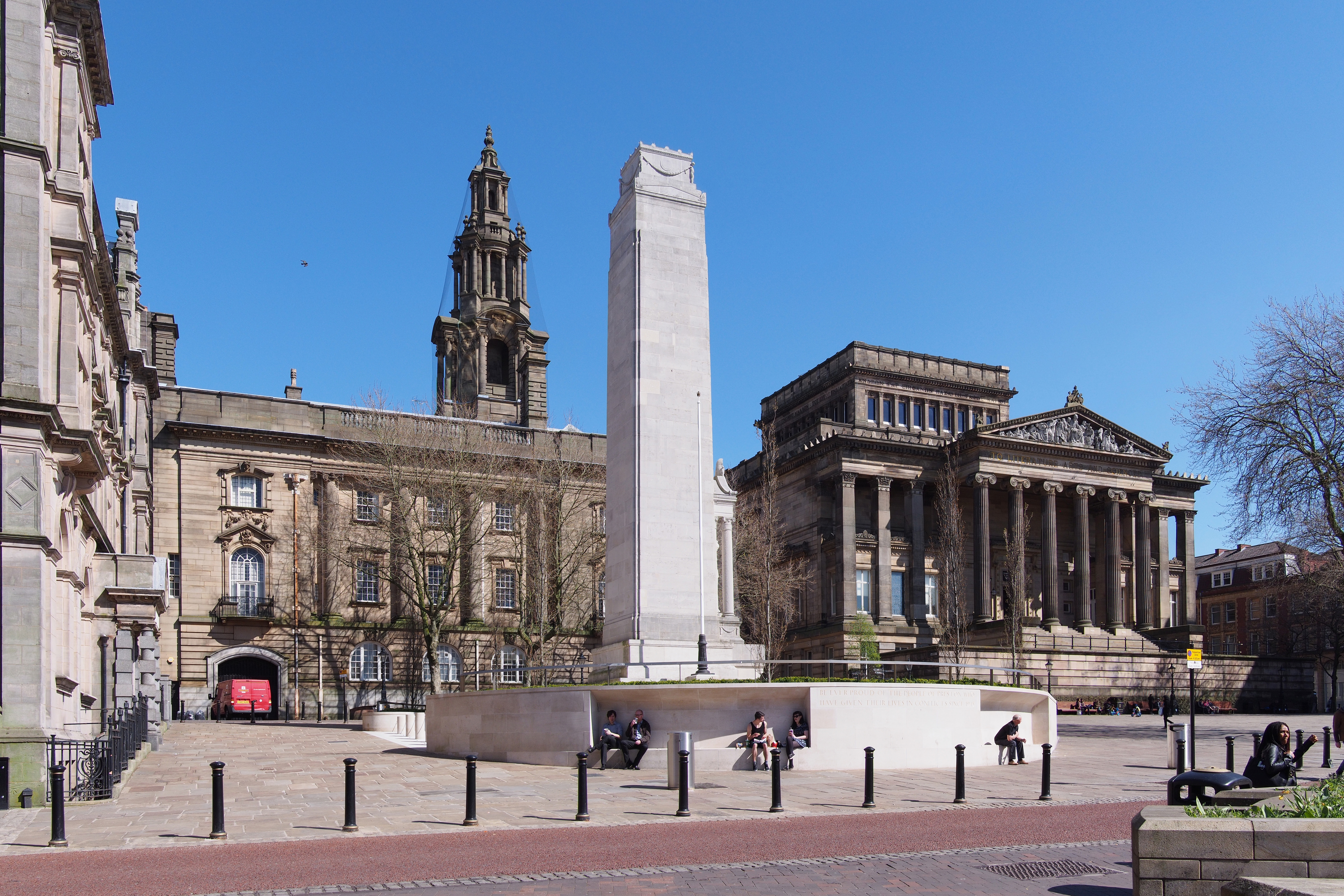
- Preston, Lancashire where the Northern Circuit is based
- Formation: 1176
- Purpose: Administrative division of the Bar and judiciary of England and Wales
- Headquarters: 101 Walker Street
- Location: England and Wales
- Circuit leader: Jamie Hamilton KC
- Parent organization: General Council of the Bar
- Website: https://www.northerncircuit.org.uk/

The Northern Circuit is a circuit of the General Council of the Bar and English judiciary.

The Northern Circuit stretches from Carlisle in Cumberland at its northernmost point, running through Lakeland to the port of Whitehaven in the West, on through Preston and Burnley in Lancashire to Manchester, Liverpool and Chester.

It has chambers in Cheshire, Liverpool, Manchester, and Preston.

== History ==
It dates from 1176 when Henry II sent his judges on circuit to do justice in his name. The Circuit originally encompassed the whole of the North of England. In 1863, Yorkshire was transferred to the Midland Circuit. In 1873, Durham and Lancashire were added, following the Supreme Court of Judicature Act 1873. In 1876, the Circuit was divided in two. That part to the west of the Pennines (Cumberland, Westmorland and Lancashire) retained the old name. The land to the east (Northumberland, Yorkshire and Durham) became the territory of the newly formed North-Eastern Circuit. The two circuits have maintained strong links.

In 1876, 62 members of the Bar had chambers on the circuit. There were 29 in Liverpool, 32 in Manchester and 1 solitary practitioner in Preston. Today the circuit has a membership of some 1100 barristers of whom about 77 are Queen's Counsel, practising from chambers in Manchester, Liverpool, Preston and Chester.

== Leadership ==
The current circuit leader is Jaime Hamilton KC, elected in 2022. Other members with leadership roles include:

- Mark Harper KC - treasurer
- Jennifer Devans Tamakloe - circuit junior
- Samantha Hillas KC - attorney general
- Virginia Hayton - solicitor general
- Andrew Howe - secretary

== Notable members ==
There have been a number of famous members, such as F. E. Smith (later to become Lord Birkenhead), Lord Shawcross QC (Leading Counsel at the Nuremberg Trials after World War II) and George Carman QC.

Since 1876 the Circuit which presently comprises 10 per cent of the Bar has produced the following judges:

- President of the Supreme Court 1
- Lord Chancellors 3
- Law Lords 7
- Lord Chief Justices 3
- President of Queen's Bench Division 1
- Master of the Rolls 3
- Presidents, Probate, Divorce & Admiralty 5
- Senior President of Tribunals 1
- Lords Justice of Appeal 28
- Lady Justice of Appeal 2
- High Court Judges 92

In 2001, one Law Lord, three Lord Justices of Appeal (including the Vice President of the Court of Appeal, Criminal Division), one Lady Justice of Appeal and 12 High Court Judges were members of the Northern Circuit. In 1994, of the five female High Court Judges, four were Northern Circuiteers. Rose Heilbron QC was the first female High Court judge from the Circuit, 20 years earlier.

There have been other members who have attained fame outside the law – the author John Buchan, W. S. Gilbert and James Boswell, the biographer of Dr. Samuel Johnson. Boswell was Junior of the Circuit.

== See also ==
- Circuits of England and Wales
- Assizes#Circuits
- Circuit court#England and Wales
