= Ranelagh School =

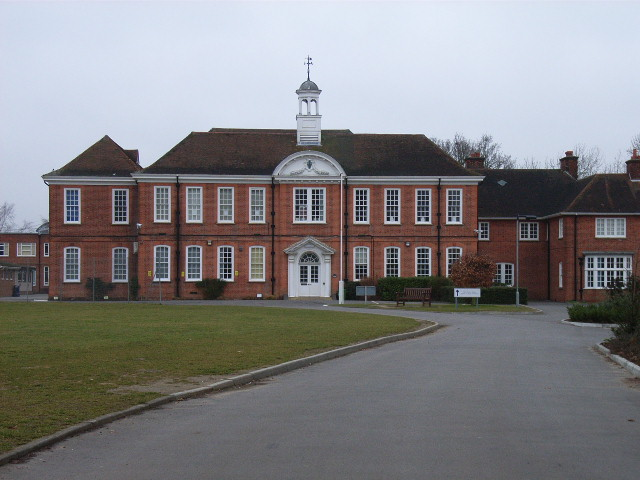

Location
- Ranelagh Drive; Bracknell, Berkshire, RG12 9DA; England; 51°24′41″N 0°44′50″W

Information
- Type: Secondary academy
- Motto: Coelitus Mihi Vires (My Strength is from Heaven)
- Religious affiliation: Church of England
- Established: 1709
- Founder: Earl of Ranelagh, Richard Jones
- Trust: Bonitas Multi-Academy Trust
- Department for Education URN: 137267 Tables
- Ofsted: Reports
- Chair of the Local Governing Body: Louise Hodkinson
- Headteacher: Timothy Griffith
- Religious head: Malcolm Chalmers
- Staff: 125
- Gender: Coeducational
- Age: 11 to 18
- Enrolment: 1035
- Houses: Braybrooke, Cleave, Waterson, Winrow
- Colours: Yellow, Green, Red and Lilac (Respectively)
- Website: https://ranelagh.bonitas.org.uk/

Ranelagh School is a Church of England day school in Berkshire close to the centre of Bracknell. The school was founded by Lord Ranelagh in 1709.

== Admissions ==
Attendance is limited to Church of England children whose parents attend church at least 12 months prior to admission. However, there are a few students of varied denominations. It is one of many schools criticised in the UK and was subject to former Secretary of State for Children, Schools and Families Ed Balls' investigation into UK schools on this basis.

Ranelagh School is over-subscribed. The predicted capacity for the school in 2019 was 1,010 and there were 1,019 students on roll, including 175 in the sixth form.

== History ==
Cranbourne Hall was a Queen Anne style mansion built in 1709 just off Drift Road, Winkfield, and which was demolished in 2008. The Earl's residence was Cranbourne Lodge of which only Cranbourne Tower is remaining. Cranbourne (sometimes Cranborne), which was a part of Winkfield parish, is about two miles from Winkfield itself, and lies mainly on Drift Road and North Road.

=== Earl of Ranelagh ===
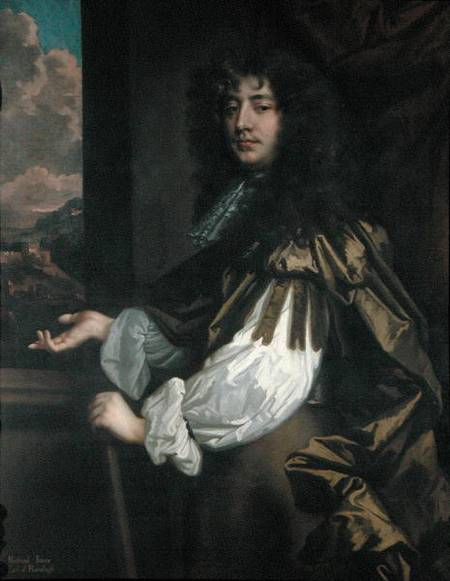
1st Earl of Ranelagh

It was home to one of the oldest schools in Berkshire, established by the 1st Earl of Ranelagh, Richard Jones, for 20 boys and 20 girls. The first master was William Waterson who ran the school for 50 years, he was also the vicar of Winkfield. Earl Ranelagh was a devout Christian, he required that the master was in holy orders, and insisted the Catechism was taught every Wednesday and Friday. The boys were to learn reading writing and arithmetick (sic), and the girls reading, writing, spinning, knitting and sewing. A set of clothes, rather like the more well-known Blue Coat School, was provided for the children and so it became sometimes known as the Green School. Every Whit Monday the children paraded outside the lychgate of Winkfield Church to be given new uniforms. The school was then run by John Boyce from 1759 to 1772 and later his son George from 1772 to 1824.

In 1709 the hours of the school were in summer 7 a.m. – 11 a.m. and 1 p.m. – 5 p.m., and winter 8 a.m. – 11 a.m. and 1 p.m. – 4 p.m. Attendance was often poor, and many pupils were expelled for non-attendance, in 1769 15% were expelled for this reason. Earlier there were no school holidays, in 1820 there were four weeks in August, one week at Christmas and Easter, and a week at Whitsun was added in 1824.

The front door opens into a full-height hall, originally a chapel, which has stained glass windows at the far end. The master's rooms were at the back with rooms in each wing to house the children. In the 1830s the single storey wings were made double storey. By 1880 the school had reached a capacity of 100 and Cranbourne Hall was sold. The school expanded to a site in Lovel Road and became known as Cranbourne Ranelagh School.

=== Foundation ===
In 1908 some of the proceeds from the sale of the Hall were used to establish a grammar school in Bracknell. This became the highly regarded Ranelagh Church of England School. Cranbourne Hall was demolished in 2008.

Ranelagh opened as a secondary school and pupil-teacher centre on its present site in Bracknell in 1908. The school was partly funded by the Ranelagh Foundation, a charitable trust, which had been involved in education in the ancient parish of Winkfield since the founding of the original school in 1709. When the school opened in Bracknell, there were four full time teachers including the first headmaster, Ernest Cleave.

By the outbreak of World War II, the number on roll had risen to one hundred and there were then eight full time teachers including the second headmaster, James Bury. An additional playing field had been purchased in Larges Lane. During the war there were, at one time, two schools sharing the use of the buildings.

The coming of the New Town and changes in national educational policy led to a major expansion of the school between 1953 and 1981 under the headships of Donovan Martin and Richard Allen.

=== Grammar school ===
The school became a Church of England voluntary aided grammar school following the Education Act 1944. Extensions were made to the buildings between 1955 and 1964, and between 1979 and 1981.

=== Current establishment ===
The school became an academy in August 2011. It was awarded Beacon School Status and is a Specialist College in Maths, Visual Arts and Business & Enterprise. In February 2006, the school received an outstanding OFSTED report and has been included in HMCI Annual Report (for the second time) as one of the most successful schools in the country. Ranelagh received its fourth Outstanding Ofsted report in 2015 under the leadership of Mrs Beverley Stevens. In 2017 the school formed the Bonitas Multi-Academy Trust with Jennett's Park Church of England Primary School.

== Notable former pupils ==
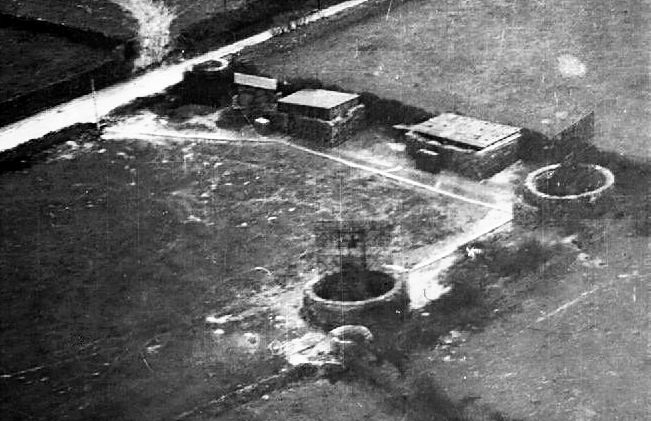
Freya radar discovered in February 1941 by Flying Officer William Kenneth Manifould

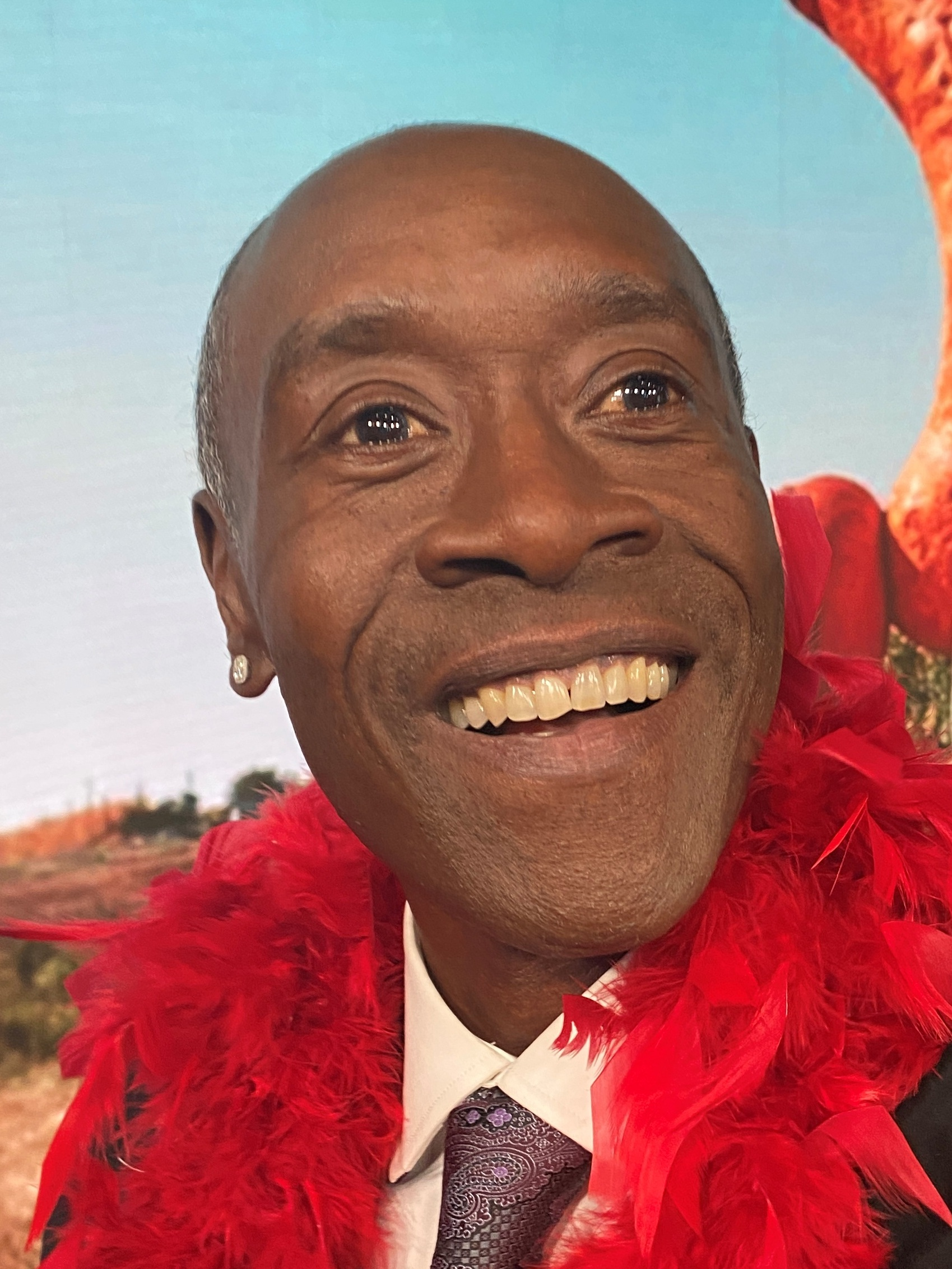
Don Cheadle, who starred in a 1979 production of Hamlet whilst at Ranelagh.

- Olivia Bailey, Labour MP for Reading West and Mid Berkshire since 2024, and Parliamentary Under-Secretary of State (Minister for Early Education) since September 2025.
- Prof William Birch, President from 1976–77 of the Institute of British Geographers, and Professor of Geography from 1990 to 1994 at the University of Bristol
- Don Cheadle, American actor who spent 1 year at the school whilst living with his British father
- Bob Edwards CBE, Editor in 1961 and 1963–65 of the Daily Express, from 1966 to 1972 of the Sunday People and from 1972 to 1984 of the Sunday Mirror
- Rhys Herbert (known professionally as Digga D), rapper, songwriter and director, attended the school for 1 year.
- Nicholas Hoult, actor
- Pilot Officer William Kenneth Manifould (28 June 1918 – 10 April 1941) of No. 1 Photographic Reconnaissance Unit RAF at RAF Benson, who discovered the first known Freya radar on 22 February 1941 on the French coast at Auderville in his Spitfire
- Paul Pindar, former Chief Executive from 1999 to 2014 of Capita plc
- Peter Sinfield, lyricist and founding member of King Crimson, responsible for In the Court of the Crimson King, and wrote songs with Andy Hill (music, also from Bracknell) for Bucks Fizz
- Anne Snelgrove, Labour MP for South Swindon from 2005 to 2010
