= Stephen Morgan (British politician) =

British Labour politician (born 1981)

Stephen Morgan MP
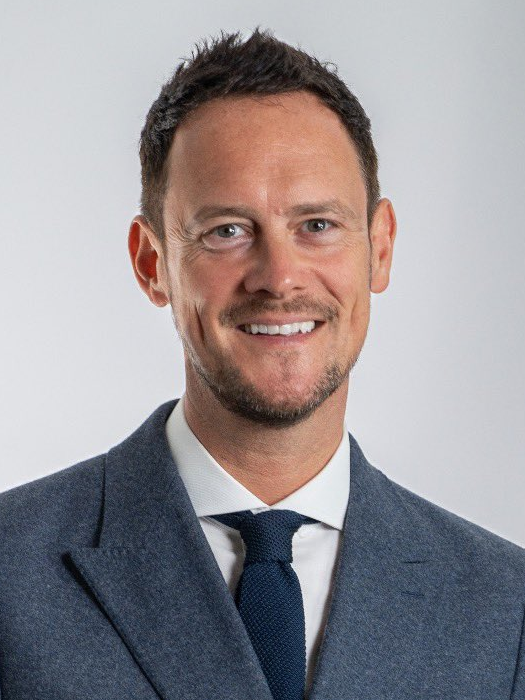
- Official portrait, 2026

Parliamentary Under-Secretary of State for Food, Fisheries and Farming (Note: Minister of State for Food Security and Rural Affairs until 22 July 2026)
- Incumbent
- Assumed office 12 June 2026
- Prime Minister: Keir Starmer; Andy Burnham
- Preceded by: Angela Eagle

Lord Commissioner of the Treasury
- In office 7 September 2025 – 12 June 2026
- Prime Minister: Keir Starmer
- Preceded by: Anna Turley
- Succeeded by: Jade Botterill

Parliamentary Under-Secretary of State for Early Education
- In office 9 July 2024 – 7 September 2025
- Prime Minister: Keir Starmer
- Preceded by: Office established
- Succeeded by: Olivia Bailey
Shadow portfolios
2023–2024	Transport
2021–2023	Schools
2020	Defence Procurement
2020–2021	Armed Forces
2019–2020	Communities

Member of Parliament for Portsmouth South
- Incumbent
- Assumed office 8 June 2017
- Preceded by: Flick Drummond
- Majority: 13,155 (33.8%)

Personal details
- Born: Stephen James Morgan; 17 January 1981 (age 45) Portsmouth, Hampshire, England
- Party: Labour
- Education: University of Bristol (BSc); Goldsmiths, University of London (MA)
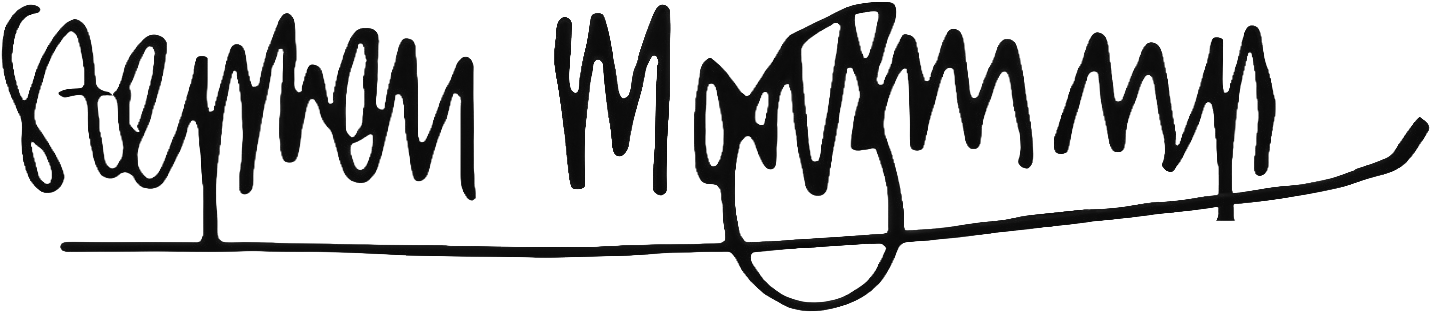
- Signature
- Website: stephenmorgan.org.uk

Stephen James Morgan (born 17 January 1981) is a British Labour Party politician who has been the Member of Parliament (MP) for Portsmouth South since 2017. He has served as Parliamentary Under-Secretary of State at the Department for Environment, Food and Rural Affairs since July 2026, after serving as Minister of State for Food Security and Rural Affairs for just over a month. From 2024 to 2025, he was the Parliamentary Under-Secretary of State for Early Education. He also previously served as a Lord Commissioner of the Treasury from 2025 to 2026.

Morgan previously sat on the Opposition front bench as a Shadow Minister for Rail, Schools, Armed Forces, Defence Procurement and Communities.

== Early life and career ==
Stephen Morgan was born on 17 January 1981 in Portsmouth, Hampshire. He attended the comprehensive Priory School in Fratton and then Portsmouth College in Baffins. He then studied politics and sociology at the University of Bristol before gaining a master's degree in politics at Goldsmiths in London.

Morgan has been chair of Portsmouth Cultural Consortium, a resident-led group committed to improving the city through cultural regeneration, vice chair of Age UK Portsmouth and a governor at Arundel Court Junior School and his former secondary, Priory School.

Before going into politics, Morgan's career was in local government working at Portsmouth City Council, later becoming Head of Community Engagement for the Royal Borough of Kensington and Chelsea. From 2015 until 2017, he was CEO of Basingstoke Voluntary Action. This role allowed him to run for public office for the first time and in May 2016 he became the councillor for Charles Dickens, a central ward in Portsmouth City Council. Later that year, he became the Leader of the Portsmouth Labour Group.

In 2016, Morgan campaigned for 'Remain' in the 2016 Brexit referendum. He was an early supporter of the 'People's Vote' campaign, arguing that the public should be given another chance to vote on Brexit. He vowed to lead the 'Remain' campaign in Portsmouth if this referendum had taken place.

== Parliamentary career ==
At the 2017 general election, Morgan was elected to Parliament as MP for Portsmouth South with 41% of the vote and a majority of 1,554.

He is an officer on the Key Cities APPG, Cycling APPG, and LGBT Labour, and a member of the Fabian Society.

Morgan frequently speaks out on veterans' issues citing Portsmouth's naval history and his own grandfather's military service as his motivation. On 3 April 2019 he hosted a Westminster Hall debate calling on the government to take further action on reducing veteran suicide. During the debate Morgan called on the Government to begin recording veterans' suicide, claiming this will improve mental health support services for the armed forces and veterans.

Morgan has criticised spending cuts to schools and colleges. He set up the "Inspiring Fratton" awards to inspire people from his home district to "aim high, work hard, and achieve their dreams".

In Parliament, Morgan has served as Parliamentary private secretary (PPS) to Andrew Gwynne, the Shadow Secretary of State for Communities and Local Government, and on the Public Accounts Committee. From July 2019 until April 2020, he served in the Shadow Communities and Local Government team as a Shadow Minister. The brief included policy areas such as adult social care, children's services, faith and community cohesion, welfare reform and debt services to community pubs.

At the 2019 general election, Morgan was re-elected as MP for Portsmouth South with an increased vote share of 48.6% and an increased majority of 5,363.

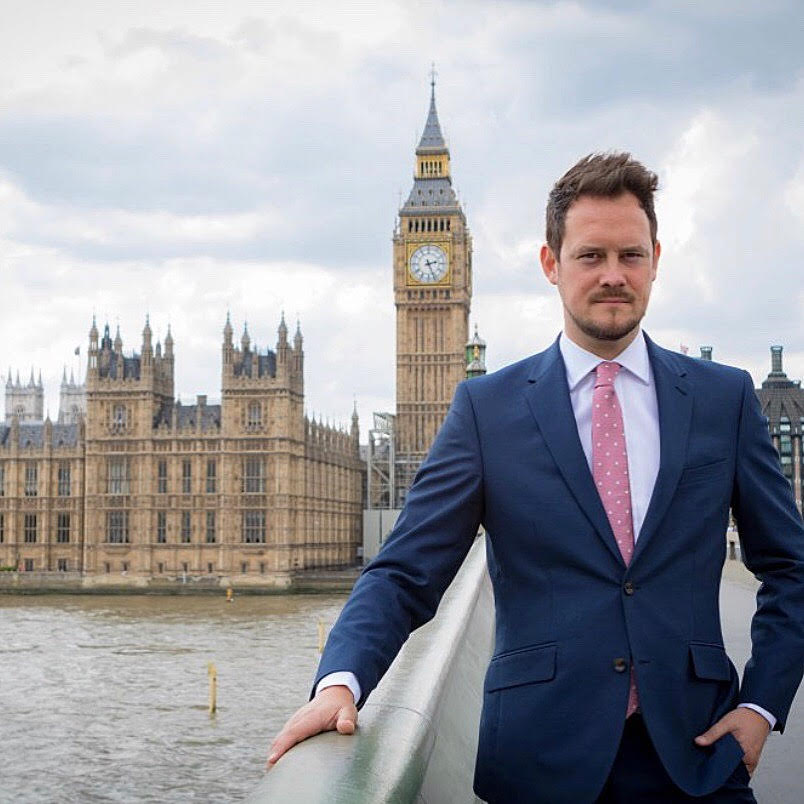
Morgan outside the Palace of Westminster

From January 2020 until April 2020 Morgan was the Shadow Minister for Defence Procurement. The brief included the delivery of the equipment and support, nuclear enterprise, exports, cyber, innovation, science and technology, estates and environment and sustainability. In April 2020, the new leader of the Labour Party Keir Starmer appointed him as Shadow Minister for the Armed Forces. In October 2020, Morgan was elected co-chair of Labour Friends of the Forces.

In August 2020 Morgan was nominated for Patchwork Foundation's Member of Parliament of the Year award.

Morgan was Shadow Minister for Schools from December 2021 to September 2023, and in this capacity often voiced support for free school meals, at the local and at the national level. In the 2023 British shadow cabinet reshuffle he was appointed Shadow Minister for Rail.

At the 2024 general election, Morgan was again re-elected, with a decreased vote share of 48.4% and an increased majority of 13,155. After the election, Morgan was appointed Parliamentary Under-Secretary of State for Early Education.

In September 2025, Morgan was appointed to the Government Whips' Office as a Lord Commissioner of the Treasury. He served as Minister of State for Food Security and Rural Affairs from June to July 2026. He has served as Parliamentary Under-Secretary of State at the Department for Environment, Food and Rural Affairs since July 2026, following Andy Burnham becoming Prime Minister.

Morgan is a member of Labour Friends of Israel and Labour Friends of Palestine and the Middle East. Morgan has vowed to not report constituents to the Home Office for immigration enforcement.

== Personal life ==
Morgan lives in Southsea. He is a patron of LGBT+ Labour and is gay, having supported Portsmouth Pride for many years. In 2023, he was recognised as "LGBT trailblazer" by Attitude magazine.

== Notes ==
Parliament of the United Kingdom
Preceded by Flick Drummond	Member of Parliament for Portsmouth South; 2017–present	Incumbent
