= Reading North =

UK Parliament constituency (1950–1955, 1974–1983)

- Former borough constituency for the House of Commons
- Boundary of Reading North in Berkshire, boundaries 1974–83
- County: Berkshire
- Major settlements: Reading

1950–1955
- Created from: Reading
- Replaced by: Reading

1974–1983
- Type of constituency: Borough constituency
- Created from: Reading
- Replaced by: Reading East and Reading West

Reading North was a borough constituency represented in the House of Commons of the Parliament of the United Kingdom. It elected one Member of Parliament (MP) by the first past the post system of election. The constituency covered an area in and around the town of Reading in the county of Berkshire.

== History ==
The Reading North parliamentary constituency was first created for the 1950 general election by splitting the previous parliamentary constituency of Reading into North and South divisions. These constituencies were merged back into a single Reading constituency for the 1955 general election.

The Reading North constituency was recreated in 1974, when it was won for the Conservative Party by Tony Durant. In 1983 the constituencies in Reading were reorganised, creating the new constituencies of Reading East and Reading West. Tony Durant went on to hold the Reading West constituency until 1997.

In both its incarnations, the constituency included Reading town centre.

== Boundaries ==
=== 1950–1955 ===
The County Borough of Reading wards of Abbey, Battle, Castle, Caversham East, Caversham West, Tilehurst, and Victoria.

It was then abolished and absorbed into the re-established constituency of Reading, with the exception of the Tilehurst ward, which was transferred to Newbury.

=== 1974–1983 ===
The County Borough of Reading wards of Abbey, Battle, Castle, Caversham, Katesgrove, Minster, Norcot, Thames, and Tilehurst.

The Tilehurst and Norcot wards were transferred back from Newbury; the remaining wards were previously part of the abolished constituency of Reading.

The constituency was abolished again for the 1983 general election, with the majority forming the basis of the new county constituency of Reading West, whilst northern areas, including Caversham, formed part of the new county constituency of Reading East.

== Members of Parliament ==
=== MPs 1950–1955 ===
Election	Member	Party
1950	Ronald Mackay	Labour
1951	Frederic Bennett	Conservative
1955	constituency abolished: see Reading	

=== MPs 1974–1983 ===
Election	Member	Party
Feb 1974	Tony Durant	Conservative
1983	constituency abolished: see Reading East & Reading West	

== Elections ==
=== Elections in the 1950s ===
General election 1950: Reading North
Party	Candidate	Votes	%
Labour	Kim Mackay	15,681	46.0
Conservative	Sir John Stanley Vincent Marling	15,154	44.5
Liberal	J Michael Derrick	3,238	9.5
Majority		527	1.5
Turnout		34,073	86.8
Registered electors		39,261	
Labour win (new seat)			

General election 1951: Reading North
Party	Candidate	Votes	%	±%
Conservative	Frederic Bennett	17,378	50.4	+6.0
Labour	Kim Mackay	17,076	49.6	+3.5
Majority		302	0.9	N/A
Turnout		34,454	86.8	+0.0
Registered electors		39,681		
Conservative gain from Labour		Swing	+1.2	

=== Elections in the 1970s ===
1970 notional result
Party	Vote	%
Conservative	24,400	52.6
Labour	21,200	45.7
Others	800	1.7
Turnout	46,400	72.5
Electorate	64,021	

General election February 1974: Reading North
Party	Candidate	Votes	%	±%
Conservative	Tony Durant	19,984	39.4	–13.2
Labour	M. J. Denby	17,615	34.7	–11.0
Liberal	J. Burnett	13,137	25.9	New
Majority		2,369	4.7	–2.2
Turnout		50,736	79.4	+6.9
Registered electors		63,943		
Conservative hold		Swing	–1.1	

General election October 1974: Reading North
Party	Candidate	Votes	%	±%
Conservative	Tony Durant	18,734	40.2	+0.8
Labour	M. J. Denby	18,266	39.1	+4.4
Liberal	K. Watts	9,064	19.4	–6.5
National Front	P. Baker	594	1.3	New
Majority		468	1.1	–3.7
Turnout		46,658	72.4	–7.0
Registered electors		64,484		
Conservative hold		Swing	–1.8	

General election 1979: Reading North
Party	Candidate	Votes	%	±%
Conservative	Tony Durant	25,085	50.6	+10.4
Labour	D. M. Mason	17,662	35.6	–3.5
Liberal	P. Minton	6,170	12.4	–7.0
National Front	P. Baker	554	1.1	–0.2
Independent	L. W. Edwards	126	0.3	New
Majority		7,423	15.0	+14.0
Turnout		49,597	75.9	+3.5
Registered electors		65,369		
Conservative hold		Swing	+7.0	

== See also ==
- List of parliamentary constituencies in Berkshire
