= Alok Sharma =

British politician (born 1967)

The Right Honourable The Lord Sharma KCMG PC
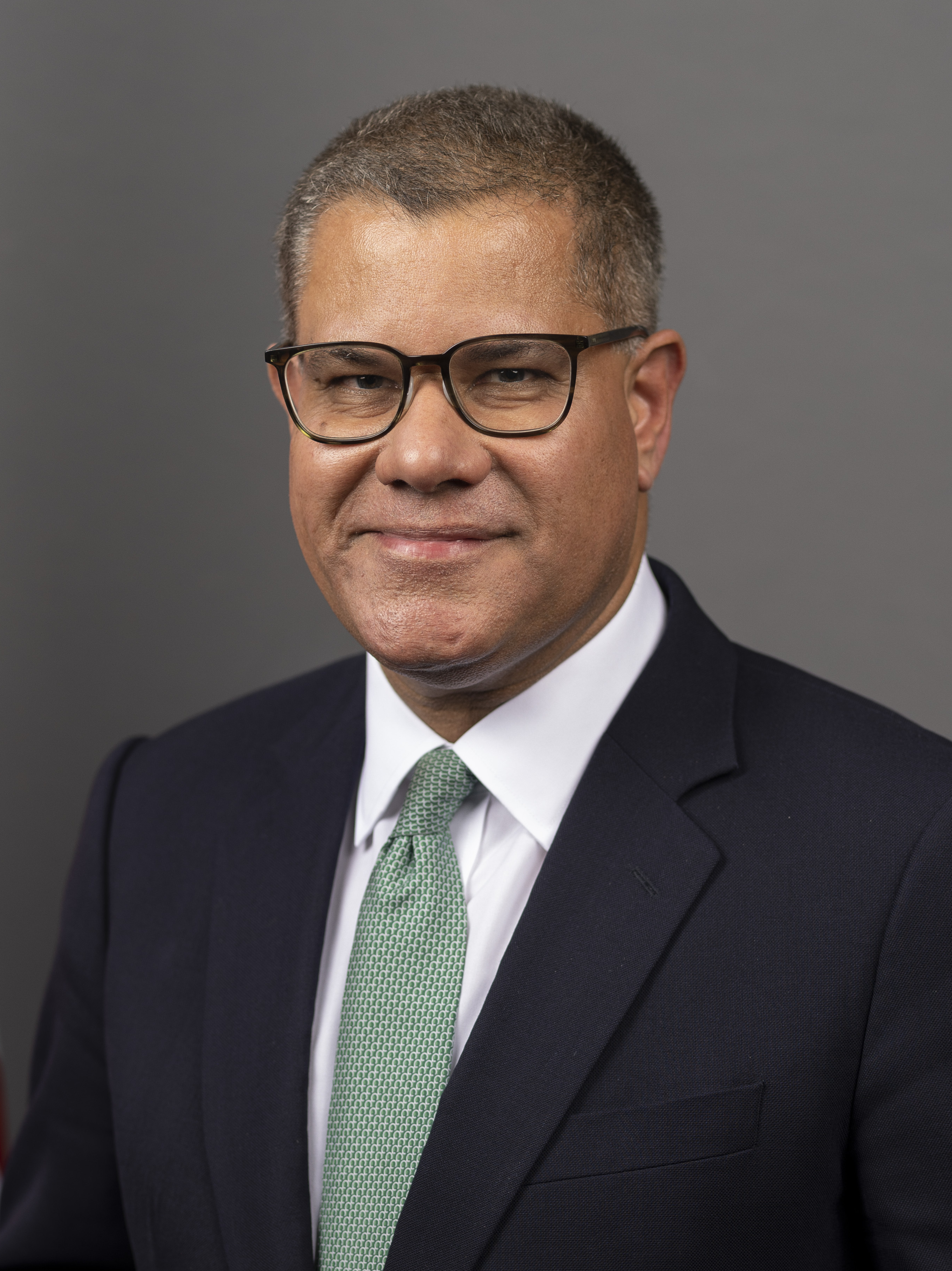
- Official portrait, 2022

President for COP26 (Note: Sharma held full Cabinet-status as Minister of State for the Cabinet Office until 25 October 2022, when Rishi Sunak removed him from the Cabinet.)
- In office 13 February 2020 – 20 November 2022
- Prime Minister: Boris Johnson; Liz Truss; Rishi Sunak
- Preceded by: Office established
- Succeeded by: Office abolished

Secretary of State for Business, Energy and Industrial Strategy
- In office 13 February 2020 – 8 January 2021
- Prime Minister: Boris Johnson
- Preceded by: Andrea Leadsom
- Succeeded by: Kwasi Kwarteng

Secretary of State for International Development
- In office 24 July 2019 – 13 February 2020
- Prime Minister: Boris Johnson
- Preceded by: Rory Stewart
- Succeeded by: Anne-Marie Trevelyan

Minister of State for Employment
- In office 9 January 2018 – 24 July 2019
- Prime Minister: Theresa May
- Preceded by: Damian Hinds
- Succeeded by: Mims Davies

Minister of State for Housing
- In office 14 June 2017 – 9 January 2018
- Prime Minister: Theresa May
- Preceded by: Gavin Barwell
- Succeeded by: Dominic Raab

Parliamentary Under-Secretary of State for Asia and the Pacific
- In office 17 July 2016 – 13 June 2017
- Prime Minister: Theresa May
- Preceded by: James Duddridge
- Succeeded by: Mark Field

Member of the House of Lords
- Lord Temporal
- Life peerage 20 August 2024

Member of Parliament for Reading West
- In office 6 May 2010 – 30 May 2024
- Preceded by: Martin Salter
- Succeeded by: Olivia Bailey (Reading West and Mid Berkshire (Note: The Reading West constituency was renamed "Reading West and Mid Berkshire" at the 2024 general election, with major boundary changes))

Personal details
- Born: Alok Kumar Sharma; 7 September 1967 (age 59) Agra, Uttar Pradesh, India
- Party: Conservative
- Spouse: Ingela Sharma (m. 1998)
- Children: 2
- Education: Presentation College; Reading Blue Coat School
- Alma mater: University of Salford (BSc)
- Occupation: Politician; accountant

Alok Kumar Sharma, Baron Sharma (born 7 September 1967), is a British politician. A member of the Conservative Party, he served as President for COP26 from 2021 to 2022, having previously served as Secretary of State for Business, Energy and Industrial Strategy from 2020 to 2021 and Secretary of State for International Development from 2019 to 2020. He was the Member of Parliament (MP) for Reading West from 2010 to 2024 and has been a member of the House of Lords since 2024.

Sharma served in Theresa May's government as Minister of State for Housing from 2017 to 2018 and as Parliamentary Under-Secretary of State for Employment from 2018 to 2019. Sharma was the president for the 2021 United Nations Climate Change Conference (COP26) and negotiated the Glasgow Climate Pact.

== Early life and career ==
Sharma was born in Agra, Uttar Pradesh, India, and moved to Reading with his parents when he was five years old. He is a Hindu. His father, Prem, was involved in Conservative politics in Reading, and became chairman of the Berkshire area of Conservatives before helping to establish the Conservative Friends of India.

Sharma was brought up in Earley and Whitley Wood and was educated at both Presentation College and Reading Blue Coat School in Sonning, before studying at the University of Salford, from where he graduated with a BSc in Applied Physics with Electronics in 1988.

He subsequently qualified as a chartered accountant, training with Deloitte Haskins & Sells in Manchester before moving into corporate finance advisory with Nikko Securities and then Skandinaviska Enskilda Banken, where he held senior roles based in London, Stockholm and Frankfurt. Sharma was an adviser to clients in the corporate and private-equity sector on cross-border mergers and acquisitions, listings and restructurings.

Sharma is a governor of a local primary school in Reading. Previously he served as a chairman of the political think-tank the Bow Group's Economic Affairs Committee.

== Political career ==
=== Member of Parliament ===
Sharma was selected as the Conservative Party candidate for the Reading West constituency in 2006. He was elected as the MP for Reading West in the 2010 general election, winning a majority of 6,004 after the retirement of the Labour MP Martin Salter.

In the 2015 general election he was re-elected with an increased majority of 6,650.

In the 2017 general election, he won his seat with a reduced majority of 2,876. On being re-elected, Sharma wrote on his website: "Having grown up locally in Reading and being very much a local Reading man, I am delighted to have been re-elected for a constituency in my home town".

In the 2019 general election Sharma increased his majority to 4,117.

On 26 September 2023, Sharma announced his intention to stand down at the 2024 general election.

=== Early parliamentary career (2010–2016) ===
Sharma served as a member of the Science and Technology Select Committee between July 2010 and February 2011 and the Treasury Select Committee between September 2014 and March 2015.

Sharma was Conservative Party Vice-Chairman for Candidates from 2012 to 2015 and co-chairman of Conservative Friends of India in 2014.

In September 2011, Sharma was appointed Parliamentary Private Secretary (PPS) to Mark Hoban, the then Financial Secretary to the Treasury. During his time as a PPS, Sharma sat on a number of public bill committees including two finance bills, the 2013 Banking Reform Bill and the 2011 Pensions Bill. He also served as PPS to Sir Oliver Letwin, the former Chancellor of the Duchy of Lancaster, who had overall responsibility for the Cabinet Office.

Following the death of two cyclists in Purley on Thames, Sharma campaigned in 2014 for longer prison sentences for those convicted of death by dangerous driving. Sharma initiated a Parliamentary debate on the issue and backed a petition, started by the families of victims, which gained more than 55,000 signatures.

Sharma campaigned to reduce the number of first-class carriages on trains operating on the Great Western route between Reading and London. In January 2015, he held a meeting with Rail Minister Claire Perry and First Great Western managing director Mark Hopwood to discuss proposals to increase Standard Class capacity to reduce overcrowding.

In 2016, Sharma was appointed as the Prime Minister's "Infrastructure Envoy to India" and was a key member of the UK team responsible for ensuring that the first ever "masala" or rupee-denominated bond, issued outside of India by an Indian company, was listed on the London Stock Exchange, strengthening further London's position as a pre-eminent world financial centre.

=== Junior minister (2016–2019) ===
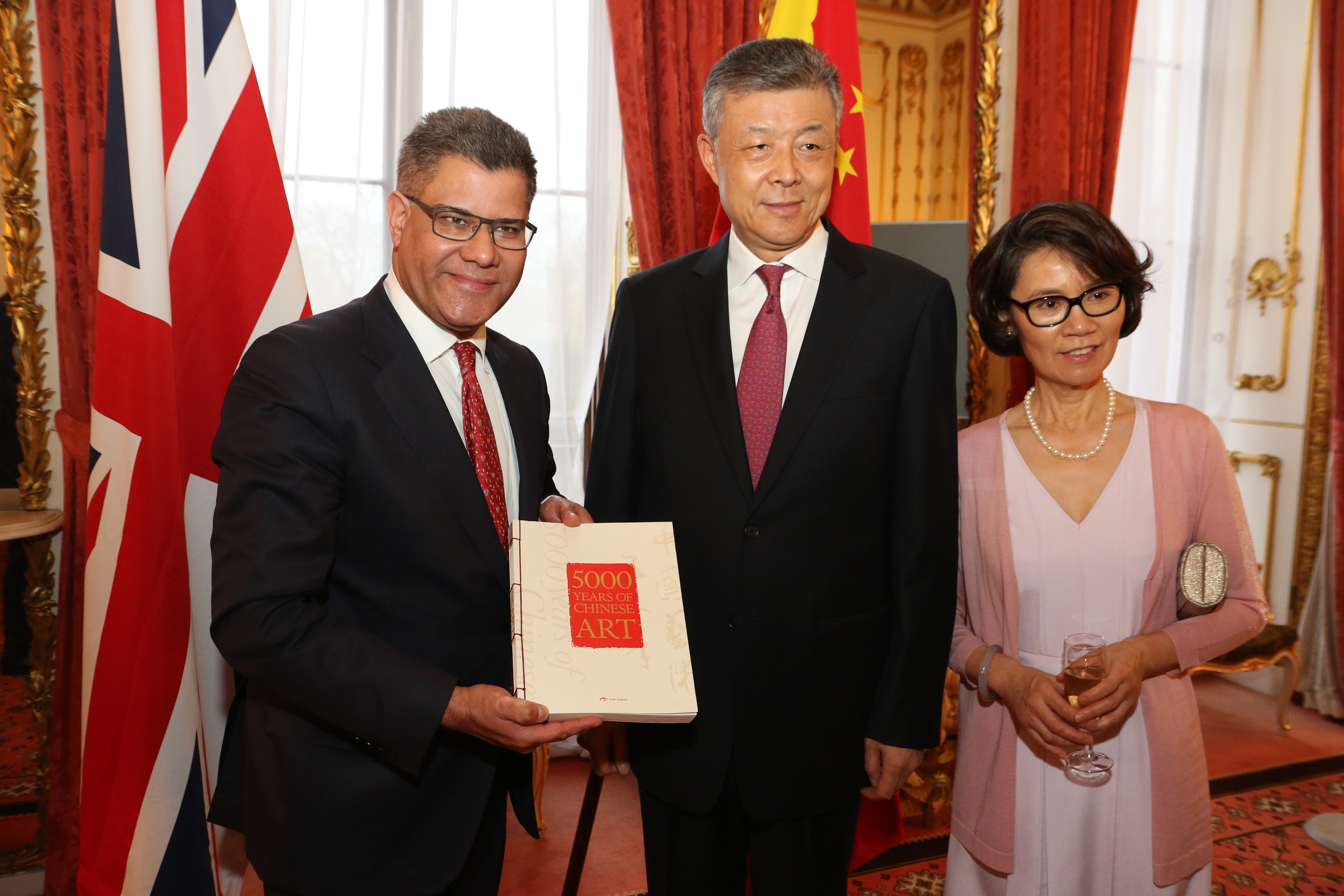
Sharma at the British Museum to mark the 45th anniversary year of ambassadorial relations between the United Kingdom and the People's Republic of China, 2017

Sharma was Parliamentary Under Secretary of State at the Foreign and Commonwealth Office from July 2016 to June 2017.

In June 2017 he was appointed Housing Minister, replacing Gavin Barwell, who lost his seat in the 2017 general election.

As the Minister of State for Housing, Sharma was responsible for the Government's response to the Grenfell Tower fire. He attracted media attention when he was visibly moved while making a statement to the House of Commons on 5 July 2017.

In January 2018, he became the Minister of State for Employment.

=== Secretary of State for International Development (2019–2020) ===
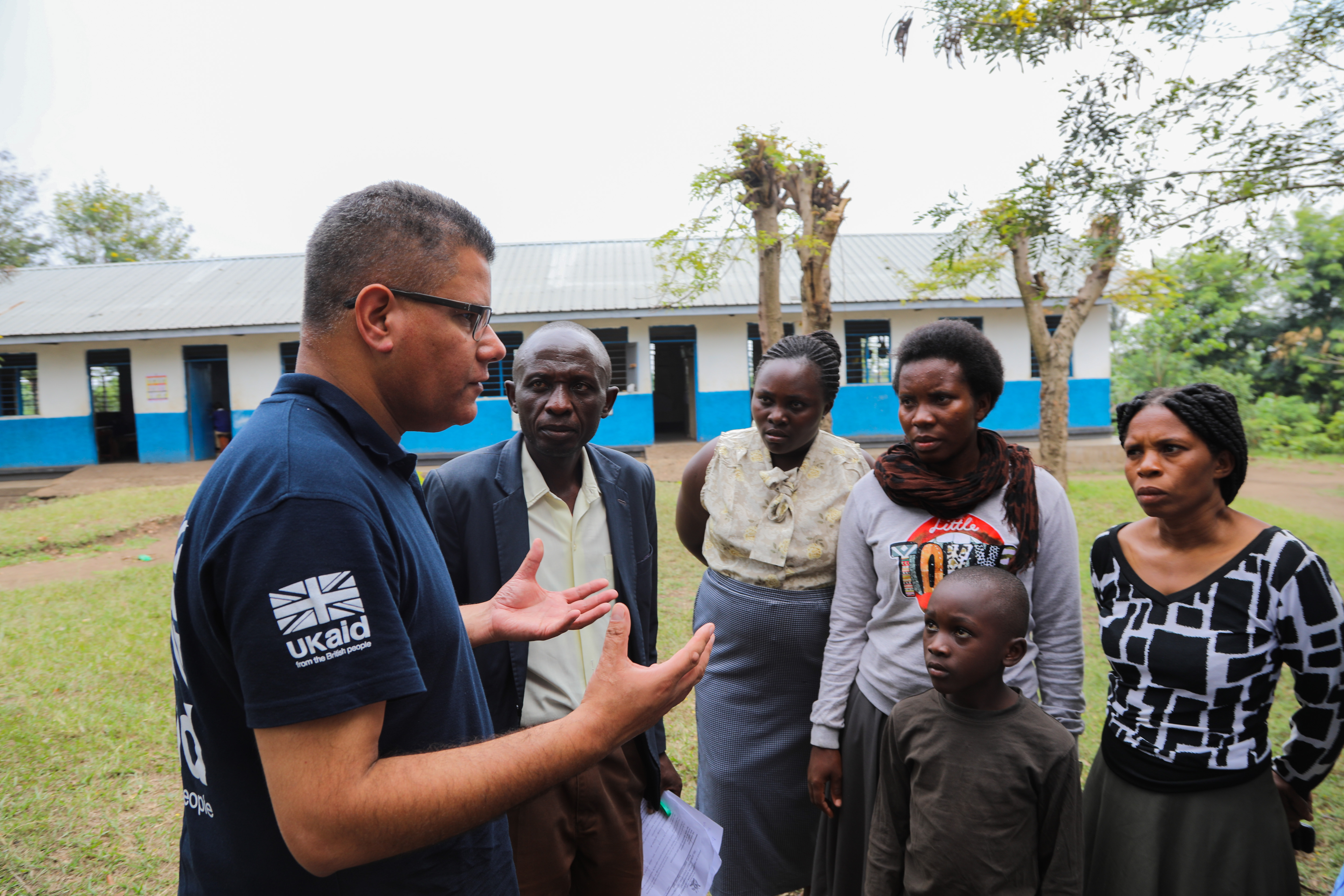
Sharma, International Development Secretary, sees Ebola preparedness work in Uganda

Sharma was appointed Secretary of State for International Development by Boris Johnson following the resignation of Rory Stewart in July 2019. Upon assuming the role, he said: "I am delighted... We will work across the whole of government to deliver Brexit and make sure the United Kingdom's aid is tackling global challenges that affect us all".

During his time at the Department, Sharma set up the International Development Infrastructure Commission, which set out recommendations on boosting private capital investment into sustainable infrastructure.

In October, Sharma stated he wanted to use the United Kingdom's leverage over the World Bank to focus the use of the nineteenth International Development Association fund on fighting climate change, building sustainable economies and promoting women's rights.

=== Secretary of State for Business, Energy and Industrial Strategy (2020–2021) ===
Following the dismissal of Andrea Leadsom in the 2020 cabinet reshuffle, Sharma was appointed to the position of Secretary of State for Business, Energy and Industrial Strategy, taking office on 13 February.

As Secretary of State, Sharma was one of the government's speakers at the daily coronavirus pandemic briefings from Downing Street.

In April 2020, Sharma led the Department's response to support businesses and jobs during the Coronavirus pandemic and chaired the UK Vaccine Taskforce's Ministerial Investment Panel.

In June 2020, he appeared visibly unwell while delivering a statement in the House of Commons. Although he underwent a test for COVID-19 which came back negative, the situation led to questions being raised about the government's decision to end the use of the virtual parliament and make MPs return to the House of Commons chamber. Certain employees of the Department for Business, Energy and Industrial Strategy were advised not to return to their work by the Public and Commercial Services Union, who said that there was a lack of evidence that the department had provided enough preventative measures against the virus.

In July 2020, Sharma instructed officials to purchase half of OneWeb, a satellite communications company, for $500 million. The company was purchased from Chapter 11 bankruptcy by the United Kingdom's government and Bharti Enterprises.

In November 2020, Sharma led on the Prime Minister's 10-point Plan for a Green Industrial Revolution and an Energy White Paper.

With the help of Lord Callanan, Sharma introduced the National Security and Investment Act 2021 to Parliament.

=== President for COP26 (2021–2022) ===
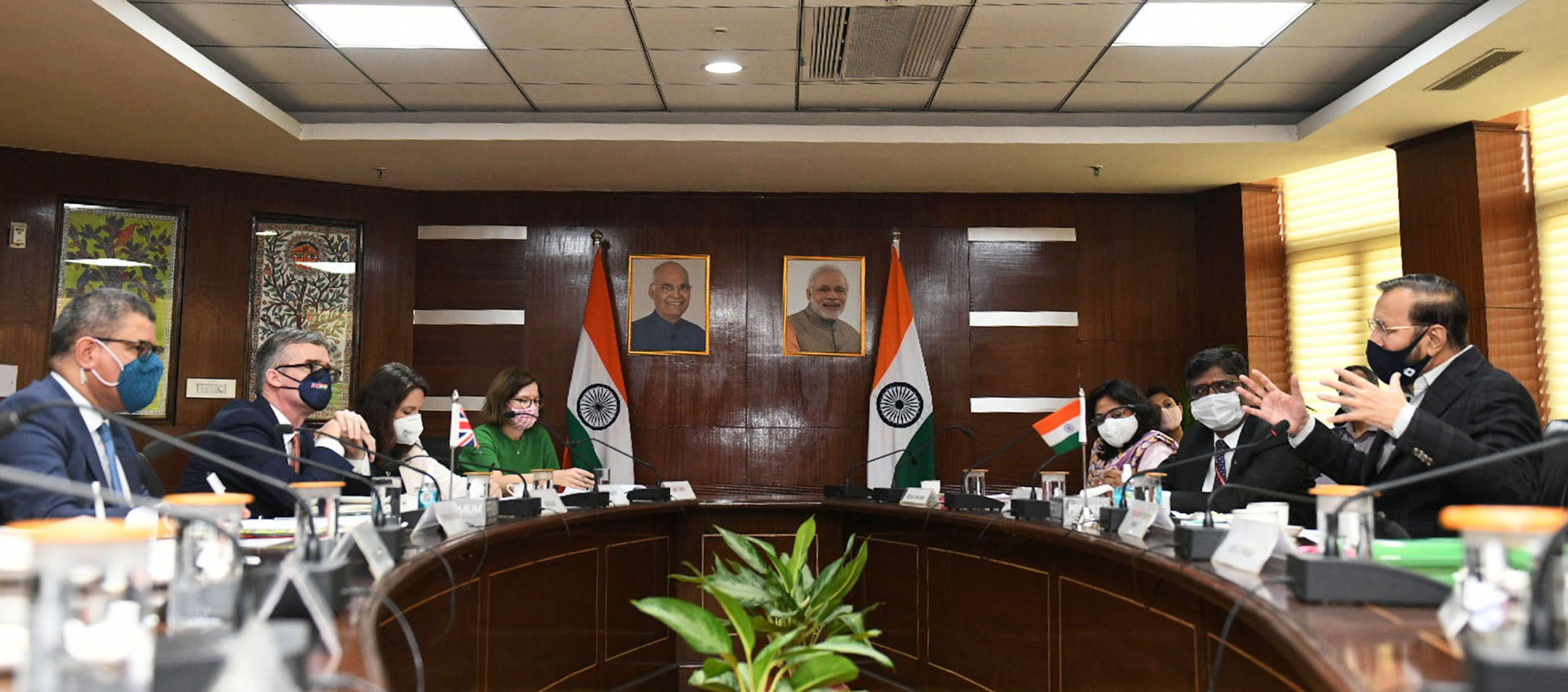
Sharma meeting with officials in New Delhi, India ahead of COP26.

In addition to his appointment as Secretary of State for Business, Energy and Industrial Strategy on 13 February 2020, Sharma was also appointed President of the 2021 United Nations Climate Change Conference (COP26), following the dismissal of Claire Perry O'Neill in January 2020. At that time the conference was planned for November 2020; in May 2020, amid the Covid pandemic, it was rearranged for November 2021. The Glasgow Climate Pact was negotiated at the conference under Sharma's Presidency.

On 8 January 2021, Sharma left his position as Secretary of State to become President of COP26 on a full-time basis, and chair of the Climate Action Implementation Committee. Sharma was formally appointed as a Minister of State in the Cabinet Office, and retained his status as a full member of the cabinet.

Amid the July 2022 Conservative Party leadership election, Sharma threatened to resign if the winning candidate did not remain committed to the UK's net zero targets. He was reappointed to his role by the Truss ministry on 6 September 2022. Upon the appointment of Rishi Sunak as Prime Minister, Sharma retained the Presidency for COP26 but was removed from cabinet. Sharma left office on 20 November 2022 following the closing plenary of COP27 held in Sharm El Sheikh, Egypt.

Sharma received a knighthood as a Knight Commander of the Order of St Michael and St George (KCMG) in the 2023 New Year Honours for services to tackling climate change.

=== Peerage ===
After standing down as an MP, Sharma was nominated for a life peerage in the 2024 Dissolution Honours. He was created Baron Sharma, of Reading in the Royal County of Berkshire, on 20 August 2024.

== Honours and awards ==
=== Fellowships ===
Sharma was awarded a Fellowship of the Science Museum Group in recognition of his leadership as the President of COP26.

Sharma is also a Visiting Fellow at the University of Oxford and a Climate and Finance Fellow & Co-Chair of the Rockefeller Foundation's Climate Advisory Council.

== Political positions ==
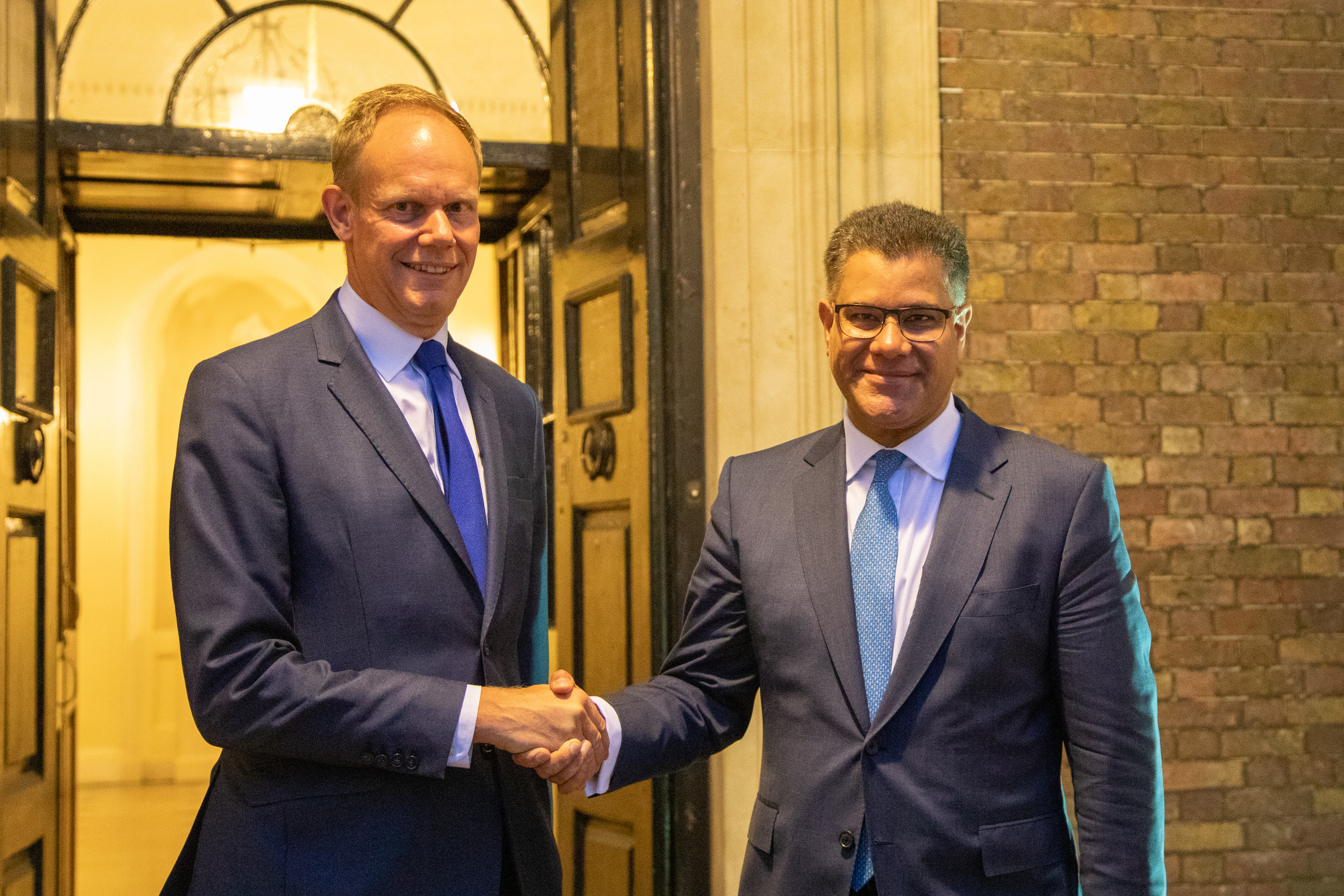
Sharma with DFID Permanent Secretary Matthew Rycroft in 2019.

=== Free schools ===
Sharma supported the opening in his Reading West constituency of one of the first free schools in England: All Saints Junior School opened in September 2011 and received an 'outstanding' rating in its first Ofsted report.

Sharma has also been appointed a patron of the Wren School, a new secondary free school opening in west Reading in September 2015. Sharma supported the West Reading Education Network in getting the new school approved and is helping the school to find an appropriate permanent site.

=== Heathrow Airport ===
Sharma has been a vocal supporter of the expansion of Heathrow Airport and has spoken in support of increasing the number of airport runways in the South East of England, claiming that "a lack of hub capacity is costing the United Kingdom jobs and investment". This is despite opposition in his own constituency. In 2009 he had opposed the third runway for the environmentally unsustainable way it was being planned and had said: "A third runway at Heathrow would inflict huge damage to the environment and to the quality of life of millions of people. It is time for the government to abandon its plans for a third runway and, if a conservative government is elected, we will certainly stop this environmental disaster". He has argued that the expansion needs to be environmentally sustainable.

=== East West Leaders' Forum ===
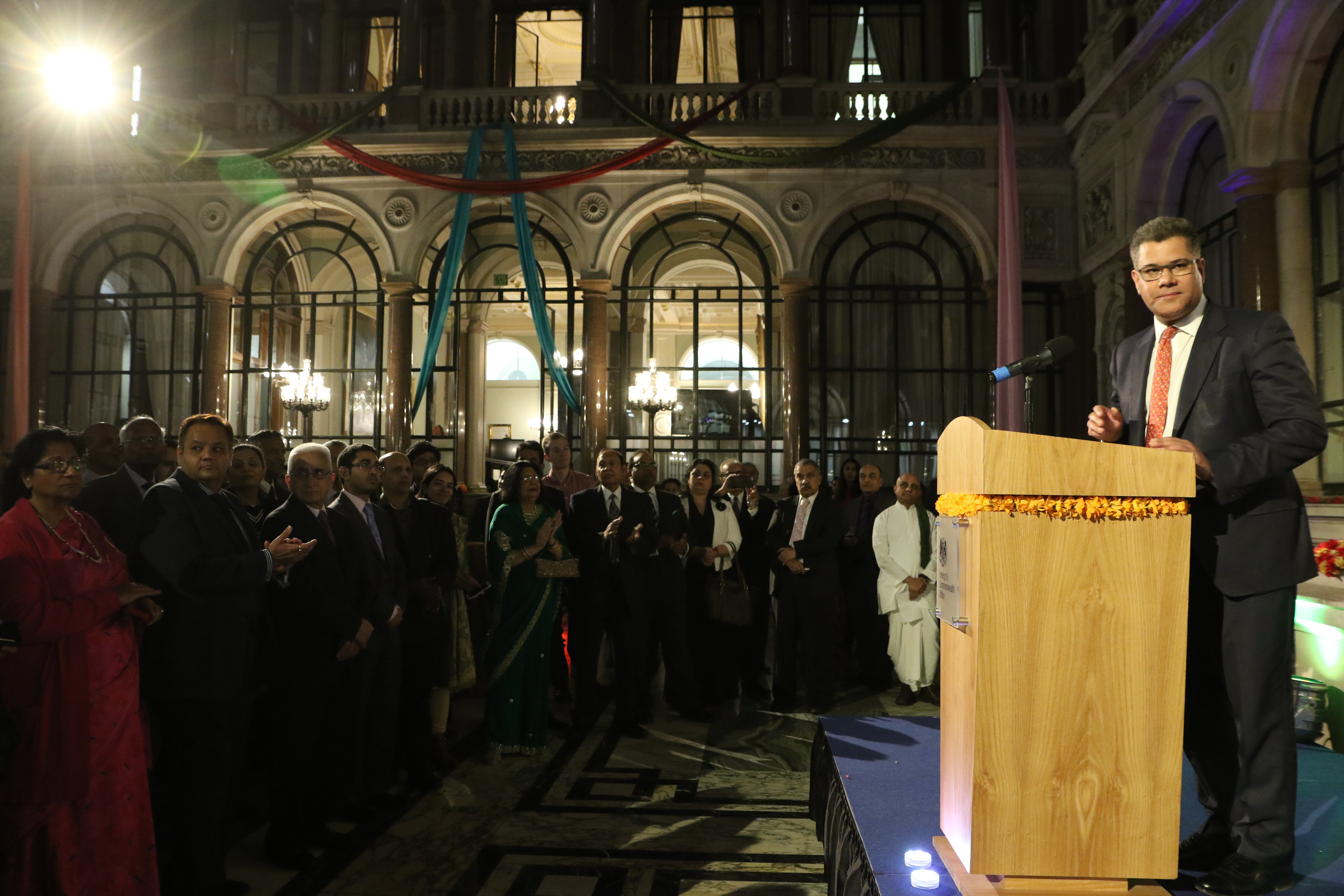
2017, Sharma speaking at a Hindu festival of Holi event at the Foreign and Commonwealth Office

Sharma set up the East West Leaders' Forum, a discussion forum between business leaders, to promote dialogue between the European Union, India and China. Theresa May, then Home Secretary, gave the keynote speech at the inaugural event, held in London in September 2014.

=== Brexit ===
Sharma supported the United Kingdom remaining within the European Union prior to the 2016 referendum. He backed Prime Minister Theresa May's Brexit withdrawal agreement in early 2019, and subsequently supported Prime Minister Boris Johnson's withdrawal agreement in October 2019.

== Personal life ==
Sharma is married and lives in Caversham, Reading, with his wife and two daughters. His wife is Swedish. Sharma took his oath in the House of Commons on the Bhagavad Gita in 2019.

== Notes ==
Parliament of the United Kingdom
Preceded by Martin Salter	Member of Parliament for Reading West; 2010–2024	Succeeded by Olivia Bailey (Reading West and Mid Berkshire)
Political offices
Preceded by James Duddridge	Parliamentary Under-Secretary of State for Asia and the Pacific; 2016–2017	Succeeded by Mark Field
Preceded by Gavin Barwell	Minister of State for Housing and Planning; 2017–2018	Succeeded by Dominic Raab
Preceded by Damian Hinds	Minister of State for Employment; 2018–2019	Succeeded by Justin Tomlinson
Preceded by Rory Stewart	Secretary of State for International Development; 2019–2020	Succeeded by Anne-Marie Trevelyan
Preceded by Andrea Leadsom	Secretary of State for Business, Energy and Industrial Strategy; 2020–2021	Succeeded by Kwasi Kwarteng
Orders of precedence in the United Kingdom
Preceded by The Lord Brady of Altrincham	Gentlemen; Baron Sharma	Followed by The Lord Grayling
