= List of electoral wards in Berkshire =

This is a list of electoral divisions and wards in the ceremonial county of Berkshire in South East England. All changes since the re-organisation of local government following the passing of the Local Government Act 1972 are shown. The number of councillors elected for each electoral division or ward is shown in brackets.

== Unitary authority councils ==
=== Bracknell Forest ===
Wards from 1 April 1974 (first election 7 June 1973) to 3 May 1979:

1. Ascot (3)
2. Binfield (1)
3. Bracknell (Great Hollands) (3)
4. Bracknell (Old Bracknell) (3)
5. Bullbrook (3)
6. College Town (1)
7. Cranbourne (1)
8. Crowthorne & Easthampstead (3)
9. Garth (2)
10. Harmanswater (2)
11. Little Sandhurst (2)
12. Priestwood (2)
13. Sandhurst (1)
14. St Marys (1)
15. Warfield (1)
16. Wildridings (2)

Wards from 3 May 1979 to 1 May 2003:

Wards from 1 May 2003 to 4 May 2023:

1. Ascot (2)
2. Binfield with Warfield (3)
3. Bullbrook (2)
4. Central Sandhurst (2)
5. College Town (2)
6. Crown Wood (3)
7. Crowthorne (2)
8. Great Hollands North (2)
9. Great Hollands South (2)
10. Hanworth (3)
11. Harmans Water (3)
12. Little Sandhurst & Wellington (2)
13. Old Bracknell (2)
14. Owlsmoor (2)
15. Priestwood & Garth (3)
16. Warfield Harvest Ride (3)
17. Wildridings & Central (2)
18. Winkfield & Cranbourne (2)

Wards from 4 May 2023 to present:

1. Binfield North & Warfield West (3)
2. Binfield South & Jennett's Park (3)
3. Bullbrook (2)
4. Crowthorne (3)
5. Easthampstead & Wildridings (3)
6. Great Hollands (3)
7. Hanworth (3)
8. Harmans Water & Crown Wood (3)
9. Owlsmoor & College Town (3)
10. Priestwood & Garth (3)
11. Sandhurst (3)
12. Swinley Forest (2)
13. Town Centre & The Parks (2)
14. Whitegrove (2)
15. Winkfield & Warfield East (3)

=== Reading ===
Wards from 1 April 1974 (first election 7 June 1973) to 5 May 1983:

1. Abbey (2)
2. Battle (2)
3. Castle (3)
4. Caversham (3) †
5. Christchurch (4)
6. Katesgrove (2)
7. Minster (6)
8. Norcot (6)
9. Park (3)
10. Redlands (3)
11. Thames (4) †; changed to (5) in 1977
12. Tilehurst (5)
13. Whitley (3)
14. Caversham Park (2); new ward added in 1977

† minor boundary changes in 1977

Wards from 5 May 1983 to 10 June 2004:

Wards from 10 June 2004 to 5 May 2022:

1. Abbey (3)
2. Battle (3)
3. Caversham (3)
4. Church (3)
5. Katesgrove (3)
6. Kentwood (3)
7. Mapledurham (1)
8. Minster (3)
9. Norcot (3)
10. Park (3)
11. Peppard (3)
12. Redlands (3)
13. Southcote (3)
14. Thames (3)
15. Tilehurst (3)
16. Whitley (3)

Wards from 5 May 2022 to present:

1. Abbey (3)
2. Battle (3)
3. Caversham (3)
4. Caversham Heights (3)
5. Church (3)
6. Coley (3)
7. Emmer Green (3)
8. Katesgrove (3)
9. Kentwood (3)
10. Norcot (3)
11. Park (3)
12. Redlands (3)
13. Southcote (3)
14. Thames (3)
15. Tilehurst (3)
16. Whitley (3)

=== Slough ===
Wards from 1 April 1974 (first election 7 June 1973) to 5 May 1983:

1. Britwell (3)
2. Burnham North (4)
3. Burnham South (3)
4. Central North (3)
5. Central South (2)
6. Chalvey (3)
7. Farnham North (3)
8. Farnham South (2)
9. Langley (9)
10. Stoke North (2)
11. Stoke South (2)
12. Upton (2)
13. Wexham Court (2)

Wards from 5 May 1983 to 10 June 2004:

1. Colnbrook & Poyle (); changed to (2) in 1997

Wards from 10 June 2004 to 22 May 2014:

1. Baylis & Stoke (3)
2. Britwell (3)
3. Central (3)
4. Chalvey (3)
5. Cippenham Green (3)
6. Cippenham Meadows (3)
7. Colnbrook with Poyle (2)
8. Farnham (3)
9. Foxborough (3)
10. Haymill (3)
11. Kedermister (3)
12. Langley St Mary's (3)
13. Upton (3)
14. Wexham Lea (3)

Wards from 22 May 2014 to 4 May 2023:

1. Baylis & Stoke (3)
2. Britwell & Northborough (3)
3. Central (3)
4. Chalvey (3)
5. Cippenham Green (3)
6. Cippenham Meadows (3)
7. Colnbrook with Poyle (2)
8. Elliman (3)
9. Farnham (3)
10. Foxborough (1)
11. Haymill & Lynch Hill (3)
12. Langley Kedermister (3)
13. Langley St Mary’s (3)
14. Upton (3)
15. Wexham Lea (3)

Wards from 4 May 2023 to present:

1. Baylis & Salt Hill (2)
2. Britwell (2)
3. Chalvey (2)
4. Cippenham Green (2)
5. Cippenham Manor (2)
6. Cippenham Village (2)
7. Colnbrook & Poyle (2)
8. Elliman (2)
9. Farnham (2)
10. Haymill (2)
11. Herschel Park (2)
12. Langley Foxborough (2)
13. Langley Marish (2)
14. Langley Meads (2)
15. Langley St Mary's (2)
16. Manor Park & Stoke (2)
17. Northborough & Lynch Hill Valley (2)
18. Slough Central (2)
19. Upton (2)
20. Upton Lea (2)
21. Wexham Court (2)

=== West Berkshire ===
Wards from 1 April 1974 (first election 7 June 1973) to 5 May 1983:

1. No. 1 (Newbury North) (4)
2. No. 2 (Newbury East) (4)
3. No. 3 (Newbury West) (4)
4. No. 4 (Beenham) (1)
5. No. 5 (Aldworth) (1)
6. No. 6 (Basildon) (1)
7. No. 7 (Mortimer) (2)
8. No. 8 (Bradfield) (1)
9. No. 10 (Burghfield) (2)
10. No. 11 (Aldermaston) (1)
11. No. 12 (Theale West) (1)
12. No. 13 (Hermitage) (1)
13. No. 16 (Sulhampstead) (1)
14. No. 17 (Tilehurst: Westwood) (2)
15. No. 18 (Tilehurst: Birch Copse) (2)
16. No. 19 (Tilehurst: Calcot & Theale East) (2)
17. No. 20 (Inkpen) (1)
18. No. 21 (Great Shefford) (1)
19. No. 22 (Hungerford) (2)
20. No. 23 (Kintbury) (1)
21. No. 24 (Lambourn) (2)
22. No. 25 (Leckhampstead) (1)
23. No. 26 (Brimpton) (1)
24. No. 27 (Chieveley) (1)
25. No. 28 (Cold Ash) (1)
26. No. 29 (Speen) (2)
27. No. 35 (Beedon) (1)
28. No. 36 (Compton) (1)
29. Bucklebury (1)
30. Greenham (1)
31. Pangbourne (2)
32. Purley (1)
33. Shaw-cum-Donnington (1)
34. Thatcham North (2)
35. Thatcham South (2)
36. Thatcham West (2)

Wards from 5 May 1983 to 1 May 1997:

Wards from 1 May 1997 to 1 May 2003:

1. Aldermaston (1)
2. Basildon (1)
3. Birch Copse (2)
4. Bradfield (1)
5. Bucklebury (1)
6. Burghfield (2)
7. Calcot (1)
8. Chievely (1)
9. Cold Ash (2)
10. Compton (1)
11. Downlands (1)
12. Falkland (3)
13. Greenham (1)
14. Hermitage (1)
15. Hungerford (2)
16. Kintbury (2)
17. Lambourn (2)
18. Mortimer (2)
19. Northcroft (3)
20. Pangbourne (1)
21. Purley on Thames (2)
22. St Johns (3)
23. Speen (1)
24. Sulhamstead (1)
25. Thatcham East (2)
26. Thatcham North (3)
27. Thatcham South (2)
28. Thatcham West (1)
29. Theale (3)
30. Turnpike (3)
31. Westwood (2)

Wards from 1 May 2003 to 2 May 2019:

1. Aldermaston (1)
2. Basildon (1)
3. Birch Copse (3)
4. Bucklebury (2)
5. Burghfield (2)
6. Calcot (3)
7. Chieveley (1)
8. Clay Hill (2)
9. Cold Ash (1)
10. Compton (1)
11. Downlands (1)
12. Falkland (2)
13. Greenham (2)
14. Hungerford (2)
15. Kintbury (2)
16. Lambourn Valley (2)
17. Mortimer (2)
18. Northcroft (2)
19. Pangbourne (1)
20. Purley on Thames (2)
21. St Johns (2)
22. Speen (2)
23. Sulhamstead (1)
24. Thatcham Central (2)
25. Thatcham North (2)
26. Thatcham South & Crookham (2)
27. Thatcham West (2)
28. Theale (1)
29. Victoria (2)
30. Westwood (1)

Wards from 2 May 2019 to present:

1. Aldermaston (1)
2. Basildon (1)
3. Bradfield (1)
4. Bucklebury (1)
5. Burghfield & Mortimer (3)
6. Chieveley & Cold Ash (2)
7. Downlands (1)
8. Hungerford & Kintbury (3)
9. Lambourn (1)
10. Newbury Central (2)
11. Newbury Clay Hill (2)
12. Newbury Greenham (3)
13. Newbury Speen (2)
14. Newbury Wash Common (3)
15. Pangbourne (1)
16. Ridgeway (1)
17. Thatcham Central (2)
18. Thatcham Colthrop & Crookham (1)
19. Thatcham North East (2)
20. Thatcham West (2)
21. Theale (1)
22. Tilehurst & Purley (3)
23. Tilehurst Birch Copse (2)
24. Tilehurst South & Holybrook (2)

=== Windsor and Maidenhead ===
Wards from 1 April 1974 (first election 7 June 1973) to 5 May 1983:

1. No. 1 (Maidenhead: Belmont) (3)
2. No. 2 (Maidenhead: Boyn Hill) (5)
3. No. 3 (Maidenhead: Furze Platt) (5)
4. No. 4 (Maidenhead: Oldfield) (3)
5. No. 5 (Maidenhead: St Marys) (4)
6. No. 7 (New Windsor: Clewer North) (3)
7. No. 8 (New Windsor: Clewer South) (3)
8. No. 9 (New Windsor: Park) (3)
9. No. 13 (Bray) (3)
10. No. 19 (Sunningdale) (3)
11. No. 20 (Sunninghill) (3)
12. Bisham & Cookham (3)
13. Castle (3)
14. Datchet (2)
15. Eton North & South (1)
16. Eton West (1)
17. Horton & Wraysbury (2)
18. Hurley (3)
19. Old Windsor (3)
20. Trinity (3)

Wards from 5 May 1983 to 1 May 2003:

Wards from 1 May 2003 to 2 May 2019:

1. Ascot & Cheapside (2)
2. Belmont (3)
3. Bisham & Cookham (3)
4. Boyn Hill (3)
5. Bray (3)
6. Castle Without (3)
7. Clewer East (2)
8. Clewer North (3)
9. Clewer South (2)
10. Cox Green (3)
11. Datchet (2)
12. Eton & Castle (1)
13. Eton Wick (1)
14. Furze Platt (3)
15. Horton & Wraysbury (2)
16. Hurley & Walthams (3)
17. Maidenhead Riverside (3)
18. Oldfield (3)
19. Old Windsor (2)
20. Park (2)
21. Pinkneys Green (3)
22. Sunningdale (2)
23. Sunninghill & South Ascot (3)

Wards from 2 May 2019 to present:

1. Ascot & Sunninghill (3)
2. Belmont (2)
3. Bisham & Cookham (2)
4. Boyn Hill (2)
5. Bray (2)
6. Clewer & Dedworth East (2)
7. Clewer & Dedworth West (2)
8. Clewer East (2)
9. Cox Green (2)
10. Datched, Horton & Wraysbury (3)
11. Eton & Castle (3)
12. Furze Platt (2)
13. Hurley & Walthams (2)
14. Old Windsor (2)
15. Oldfield (2)
16. Pinkneys Green (2)
17. Riverside (2)
18. St Mary's (2)
19. Sunningdale & Cheapside (2)

=== Wokingham ===
Wards from 1 April 1974 (first election 7 June 1973) to 3 May 1979:

1. No. 4 (Earley Central) (2)
2. No. 5 (Earley North) (1)
3. No. 6 (Earley South) (2)
4. No. 8 (Shinfield: Rise & Grazeley) (1)
5. No. 9 (Shinfield: Ryeish Green) (1)
6. No. 10 (Shinfield: School) (1)
7. No. 17 (South Woodley) (1)
8. No. 23 (Norreys) (3)
9. No. 24 (Westcott) (1)
10. Arborfield (1)
11. Barkham (1)
12. Bulmershe (4)
13. California (2)
14. Charvil (1)
15. Coronation (3)
16. Emmbrook (1)
17. Evendons (2)
18. Finchampstead (2)
19. Hurst (1)
20. Little Hungerford (2)
21. Loddon (4)
22. Norreys (2)
23. Remenham & Wargrave (2)
24. Sonning (1)
25. St Sebastians (3)
26. Swallowfield (1)
27. Twyford & Ruscombe (3)
28. Winnersh (3)

Wards from 3 May 1979 to 10 June 2004:

1. Arborfield (1)
2. Barkham (1)
3. Bulmershe (2)
4. Charvil (1)
5. Coronation (3)
6. Emmbrook (3)
7. Evendons (3)
8. Finchampstead North (2)
9. Finchampstead South (2)
10. Hurst (1)
11. Little Hungerford (3)
12. Loddon (3)
13. Norreys (3)
14. Redhatch (3)
15. Remenham & Wargrave (2)
16. Shinfield (3)
17. Sonning (1)
18. South Lake (3)
19. Swallowfield (1)
20. Twyford & Ruscombe (3)
21. Westcott (2)
22. Whitegates (2)
23. Winnersh (3)
24. Wokingham Without (3)

Wards from 10 June 2004 to 2 May 2024:

1. Arborfield (1)
2. Barkham (1)
3. Bulmershe & Whitegates (3)
4. Charvil (1)
5. Coronation (2)
6. Emmbrook (3)
7. Evendons (3)
8. Finchampstead North (2)
9. Finchampstead South (2)
10. Hawkedon (3)
11. Hillside (3)
12. Hurst (1)
13. Loddon (3)
14. Maiden Erlegh (3)
15. Norreys (3)
16. Remenham, Wargrave & Ruscombe (2)
17. Shinfield North (1)
18. Shinfield South (3)
19. Sonning (1)
20. South Lake (2)
21. Swallowfield (1)
22. Twyford (2)
23. Wescott (2)
24. Winnersh (3)
25. Wokingham Without (3)

Wards from 2 May 2024 to present:

1. Barkham & Arborfield (3)
2. Bulmershe & Coronation (3)
3. Emmbrook (3)
4. Evendons (3)
5. Finchampstead (3)
6. Hawkedon (3)
7. Hillside (3)
8. Loddon (3)
9. Maiden Erlegh & Whitegates (3)
10. Norreys (3)
11. Shinfield (3)
12. South Lake (3)
13. Spencers Wood & Swallowfield (3)
14. Thames (3)
15. Twyford, Ruscombe & Hurst (3)
16. Wescott (3)
17. Winnersh (3)
18. Wokingham Without (3)

== Former county council ==
=== Berkshire ===
Electoral Divisions from 1 April 1974 (first election 12 April 1973) to 2 May 1985:

1. Aldermaston (1)
2. Boxford (1)
3. Bradfield (1)
4. Bray (1)
5. Burghfield (1)
6. Compton (1)
7. Cookham (1)
8. Easthampstead No. 1 (Sandhurst) (1)
9. Easthampstead No. 2 (Crowthorne) (1)
10. Easthampstead No. 3 (Winkfield) (1)
11. Easthampstead No. 4 (Binfield) (1)
12. Easthampstead No. 5 (1)
13. Easthampstead No. 6 (1)
14. Easthampstead No. 7 (Bracknell-Bull (1)
15. Easthampstead No. 8 (Bracknell-Prie (1)
16. Eton (1)
17. Eton Rural No. 1 (Britwell) (1)
18. Eton Rural No. 2 (1)
19. Eton Rural No. 3 (Wexham Court) (1)
20. Hungerford (1)
21. Hurley (1)
22. Lambourn (1)
23. Maidenhead (Belmont) (1)
24. Maidenhead (Boyn Hill) (2)
25. Maidenhead (Furze Platt) (1)
26. Maidenhead (Oldfield) (1)
27. Maidenhead (St Marys) (1)
28. Newbury (East) (1)
29. Newbury (North) (1)
30. Newbury (West) (1)
31. Old Windsor (1)
32. Pangbourne (1)
33. Reading (Abbey) (1)
34. Reading (Battle) (1)
35. Reading (Castle) (1)
36. Reading (Caversham) (1) †
37. Reading (Christchurch) (2)
38. Reading (Katesgrove) (1)
39. Reading (Minster) (2)
40. Reading (Norcot) (2)
41. Reading (Park) (1)
42. Reading (Redlands) (1)
43. Reading (Thames) (2) †
44. Reading (Tilehurst) (2)
45. Reading (Whitley) (1)
46. Slough No. 1 (Burnham North) (1)
47. Slough No. 2 (Burnham South) (1)
48. Slough No. 3 (Central North) (1)
49. Slough No. 4 (Central South & Sto (1)
50. Slough No. 5 (Chalvey) (1)
51. Slough No. 6 (Farnham North) (1)
52. Slough No. 7 (Farnham South) (1)
53. Slough No. 8 (Langley) (3)
54. Slough No. 9 (Stoke North) (1)
55. Slough No. 10 (Upton) (1)
56. Speen (1)
57. Sunningdale (1)
58. Sunninghill (1)
59. Thatcham (1)
60. Theale (1)
61. Windsor (Castle) (1)
62. Windsor (Clewer North) (1)
63. Windsor (Clewer South) (1)
64. Windsor (Park) (1)
65. Windsor (Trinity) (1)
66. Wokingham No. 1 (Norreys) (1)
67. Wokingham No. 2 (1)
68. Wokingham No. 3 (1)
69. Wokingham Rural No. 1 (2)
70. Wokingham Rural No. 2 (1)
71. Wokingham Rural No. 3 (1)
72. Wokingham Rural No. 4 (1)
73. Wokingham Rural No. 5 (Swallowfield (1)
74. Wokingham Rural No. 6 (1)
75. Wokingham Rural No. 7 (1)
76. Wokingham Rural No. 8 (Twyford) (1)
77. Wokingham Rural No. 9 (1)
78. Reading (Caversham Park) (1); new electoral division added in 1977

† minor boundary changes in 1977

Electoral Divisions from 2 May 1985 to 1 April 1998 (county abolished):

1. Abbey (1)
2. Ascot & Sunningdale (1)
3. Battle (1)
4. Belmont (1)
5. Binfield (1)
6. Boyn Hill (1)
7. Bradfield (1)
8. Bray (1)
9. Britwell (1)
10. Bullbrook (1)
11. Bulmershe (1)
12. Burghfield (1)
13. Caversham (1)
14. Chalvey (1)
15. Church (1)
16. Cippenham (1)
17. Clewer (1)
18. Cold Ash (1)
19. Cookham Bisham & Hurley (1)
20. Cox Green (1)
21. Crowthorne (1)
22. Datchet Horton & Wraysbury (1)
23. Downlands (1)
24. Easthampstead (1)
25. Emmbrook (1)
26. Eton & Castle (1)
27. Evendons (1)
28. Falkland (1)
29. Farnham (1)
30. Finchamstead (1)
31. Furze Platt & Pinkneys Green (1)
32. Great Hollands (1)
33. Great Park (1)
34. Greenham (1)
35. Hanworth (1)
36. Harmanswater (1)
37. Haymill (1)
38. Hungerford (1)
39. Hurst (1)
40. Katesgrove (1)
41. Kentwood (1)
42. Lambourn Valley (1)
43. Langley East (1)
44. Langley West (1)
45. Little Hungerford (1)
46. Loddon (1)
47. Minster (1)
48. Norcot (1)
49. Old Windsor & Sunninghill (1)
50. Oldfield (1)
51. Pangbourne (1)
52. Park (1)
53. Peppard (1)
54. Redhatch (1)
55. Redlands (1)
56. Salt Hill (1)
57. Sandhurst (1)
58. Slough Central (1)
59. Sonning (1)
60. Southcote (1)
61. Speenhamland (1)
62. St Marys (1)
63. Swallowfield (1)
64. Thames (1)
65. Thatcham (1)
66. Theale (1)
67. Tilehurst Central (1)
68. Tilehurst West (1)
69. Trinity (1)
70. Twyford (1)
71. Upton (1)
72. Wescott (1)
73. Wexham Lea (1)
74. Whitley (1)
75. Winkfield (1)
76. Wokingham Without (1)

== Electoral wards by constituency ==
Wards as they existed on 1 December 2020.

=== Bracknell ===
Bracknell Forest: Bullbrook; Central Sandhurst; College Town; Crown Wood; Crowthorne; Great Hollands North; Great Hollands South; Hanworth; Harmans Water; Little Sandhurst & Wellington; Old Bracknell; Owlsmoor; Priestwood & Garth; Warfield Harvest Ride; Wildridings & Central.

=== Earley and Woodley ===
Reading: Church; Whitley.

Wokingham: Bulmershe & Whitegates; Coronation; Hawkedon; Hillside; Loddon; Maiden Erlegh; Shinfield North; Shinfield South; Sonning; South Lake.

=== Maidenhead ===
Bracknell Forest: Ascot; Binfield with Warfield; Winkfield & Cranbourne.

Windsor and Maidenhead: Belmont; Bisham & Cookham; Boyn Hill; Bray; Cox Green; Furze Platt; Hurley & Walthams; Oldfield; Pinkneys Green; Riverside; St. Mary’s.

=== Newbury ===
West Berkshire: Chieveley & Cold Ash; Downlands (polling districts BG, CA, CB, EA, FA, FB, GA1, GA2, LB & PC); Hungerford & Kintbury; Lambourn; Newbury Central; Newbury Clay Hill; Newbury Greenham; Newbury Speen; Newbury Wash Common; Thatcham Central; Thatcham Colthrop & Crookham; Thatcham North East; Thatcham West.

=== Reading Central ===
Reading: Abbey; Battle; Caversham; Katesgrove; Mapledurham; Minster; Park; Peppard; Redlands; Southcote; Thames.

=== Reading West and Mid Berkshire ===
Reading: Kentwood; Norcot; Tilehurst.

West Berkshire: Aldermaston; Basildon; Bradfield; Bucklebury; Burghfield & Mortimer; Downlands (polling district BC); Pangbourne; Ridgeway; Theale; Tilehurst & Purley; Tilehurst Birch Copse; Tilehurst South & Holybrook.

=== Slough ===
Slough: Baylis & Stoke; Britwell & Northborough; Central; Chalvey; Cippenham Green; Cippenham Meadows; Elliman; Farnham; Haymill & Lynch Hill; Langley St. Mary’s; Upton; Wexham Lea.

=== Windsor (part) ===
Slough: Colnbrook with Poyle; Foxborough; Langley Kedermister.

Windsor and Maidenhead: Ascot & Sunninghill; Clewer & Dedworth East; Clewer & Dedworth West; Clewer East; Datchet, Horton & Wraysbury; Eton & Castle; Old Windsor; Sunningdale & Cheapside.

=== Wokingham ===
Wokingham: Arborfield; Barkham; Charvil; Emmbrook; Evendons; Finchampstead North; Finchampstead South; Hurst; Norreys; Remenham, Wargrave and Ruscombe; Swallowfield; Twyford; Wescott; Winnersh; Wokingham Without.

== See also ==
- List of parliamentary constituencies in Berkshire
