= Olivia Bailey =

British politician

Olivia Bailey MP
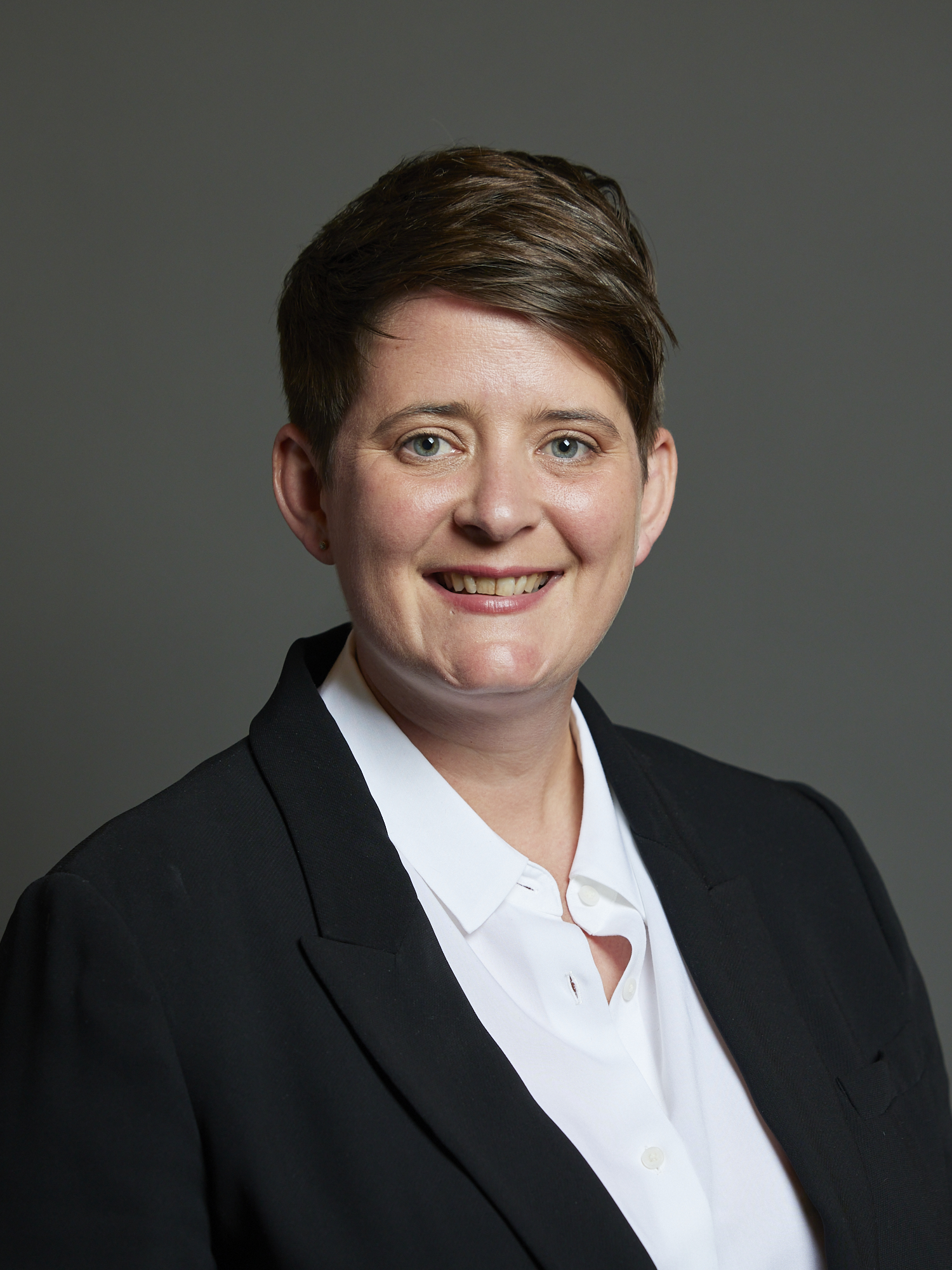
- Official portrait, 2024

Chair of the Women and Equalities Committee
- Incumbent
- Assumed office 14 September 2026
- Preceded by: Sarah Owen

Parliamentary Under-Secretary of State for Early Education
- In office 7 September 2025 – 22 July 2026
- Prime Minister: Keir Starmer
- Preceded by: Stephen Morgan
- Succeeded by: Paul Waugh

Parliamentary Under-Secretary of State for Equalities
- In office 7 September 2025 – 22 July 2026
- Prime Minister: Keir Starmer
- Preceded by: Nia Griffith
- Succeeded by: Simon Lightwood

Member of Parliament for Reading West and Mid Berkshire
- Incumbent
- Assumed office 4 July 2024
- Preceded by: Alok Sharma (Reading West (Note: The Reading West constituency was renamed "Reading West and Mid Berkshire" at the 2024 general election, with major boundary changes))
- Majority: 1,361 (3.0%)

Personal details
- Born: Olivia Joanna Bailey; 1986 (age 39–40) Reading, Berkshire, England
- Party: Labour
- Spouse: Finn McGoldrick
- Children: 2
- Education: Ranelagh School, St Hilda's College, Oxford (BA)

Olivia Joanna Bailey (born 1986) is a British Labour Party politician who has been the Member of Parliament (MP) for Reading West and Mid Berkshire since 2024. She served as Parliamentary Under-Secretary of State for Early Education and Parliamentary Under-Secretary of State for Equalities concurrently from 2025 to 2026. Bailey currently chairs the Women and Equalities Committee.

== Early life and education ==
Bailey was born in Reading, Berkshire in 1986 to a policeman father and teacher mother. She attended Ranelagh School in Bracknell and experienced homophobic bullying at school.

Bailey studied at St Hilda's College, Oxford, where she was the Junior Common Room President. She graduated in 2008 with a Bachelor of Arts in Modern History and Politics.

She was Women's Officer of the National Union of Students (NUS) from 2009 to 2011, and Chair of Labour Students from 2011 to 2012. As an officer of the NUS, Bailey created the Vote for Students pledge and published the first national study into harassment and abuse suffered by women students.

== Political career ==
Bailey had been Chair of the Labour Women's Network, deputy General Secretary of the Fabian Society, and a senior aide to Keir Starmer, before standing as a parliamentary candidate.

Bailey contested Reading West at the 2017 general election, but was defeated by the incumbent Member of Parliament (MP), Alok Sharma.

At the 2024 general election, Bailey was elected as MP for the new Reading West and Mid Berkshire constituency with 35% of the vote. She was subsequently appointed parliamentary private secretary to the Work and Pensions Secretary, Liz Kendall.

In September 2025 she was appointed as Parliamentary Under-Secretary of State (Minister for Early Education) and Parliamentary Under-Secretary of State (Minister for Equalities) at the Department for Education, with the latter focusing on LGBT+ legislation and policy.

In April 2026 she voted against the motion to launch a parliamentary inquiry into Prime Minister Sir Keir Starmer's vetting of Lord Mandelson.

== Personal life ==
Bailey is married to Finn McGoldrick, with whom she has two children. McGoldrick is a Member of Reading Council.

Her father, Roy Bailey, has been a Member of Bracknell Forest Council since 2023.
