= City of Portsmouth College =

City of Portsmouth College College
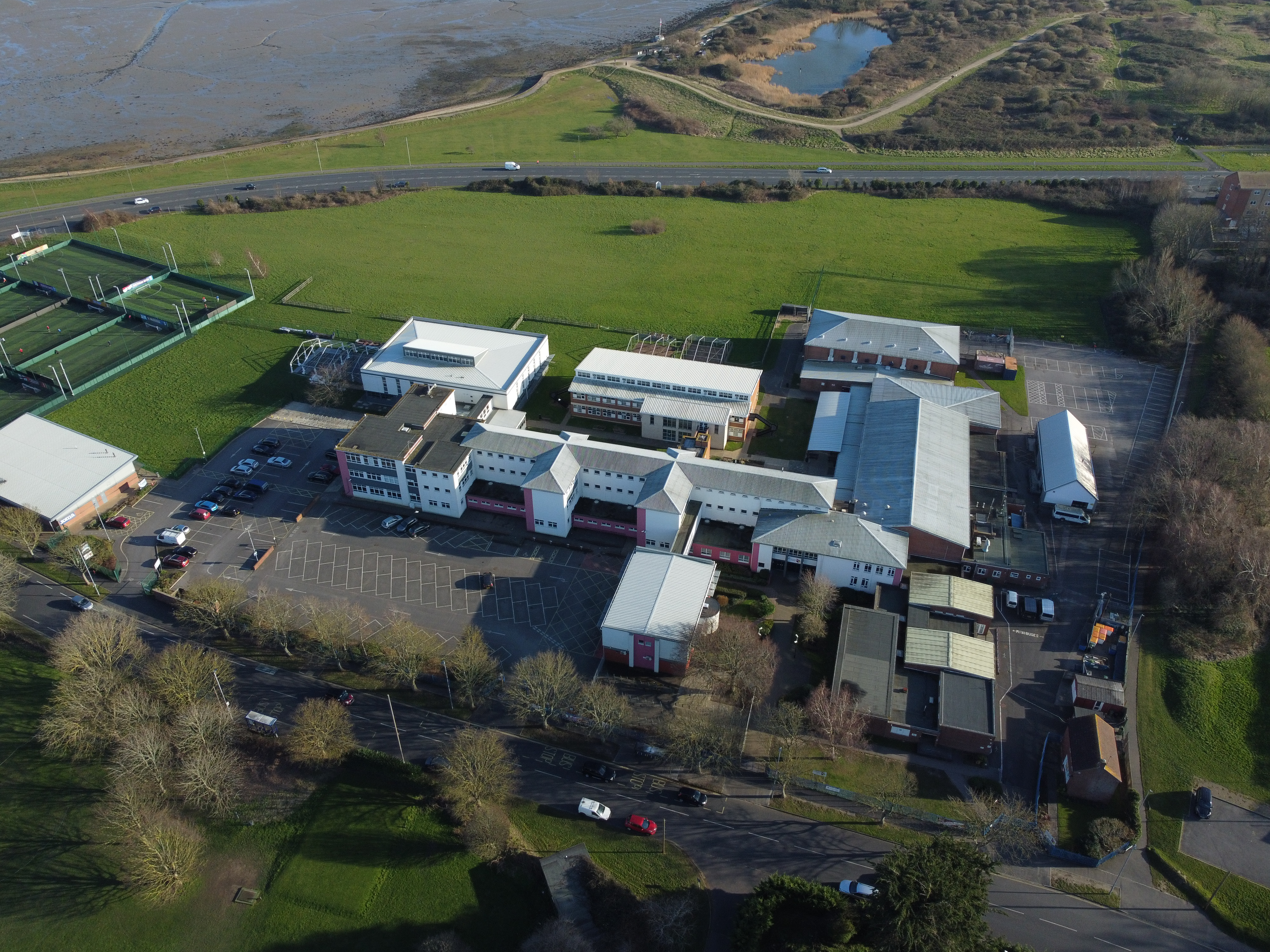

Location
- Tangier Road; Portsmouth, Hampshire, PO3 6PZ; England
- Coordinates: 50.808322°N 1.045800°W

Information
- Type: Further education college
- Established: August 2021 (merger of Highbury College and Portsmouth College)
- Local authority: Portsmouth
- Department for Education URN: 130697 Tables
- Ofsted: Reports
- Chair of Governors: Paul Quigley
- Principal and CEO: Katy Quinn
- Gender: Mixed
- Age: 16 to 99+
- Website: https://www.city-of-portsmouth-college.ac.uk/

The City of Portsmouth College was formed in August 2021 from a merger between Highbury College and Portsmouth College, creating a new, combined educational institution with four campuses in Portsmouth.

The primary campus of the college is Highbury Campus and is located in central Cosham.

== Admissions ==
The principal and CEO of City of Portsmouth College is Katy Quinn who joined the college in summer 2022, taking over from interim CEO Graham Morley.

== The College ==
City of Portsmouth College operates across four campuses in Portsmouth, offering a wide range of academic, technical, professional, and vocational courses. With nearly 60 years of experience, the college maintains strong links with local industries to align education with regional employment needs. Its campuses provide modern facilities, specialist staff, and student support services, supported by good transport connections throughout the city.

In 2025, the college reported a 96% overall pass rate across all campuses, marking its fourth consecutive record year of results. Over 1,000 students achieved success in 1,633 academic, technical, and vocational qualifications, with 50 courses attaining 100% pass rates. At the Sixth Form Campus, 15% of students achieved straight A–A* grades, and more than half received A*–B grades in subjects including English, film studies, sociology, business, and politics. The college reported 100% pass rates in Early Years and Health T Levels, as well as in 17 of 26 vocational courses. Following these results, 334 students secured places at their first-choice universities, including 41 at Russell Group institutions, while others began apprenticeships with leading UK companies.

Also in 2025, the college announced that its landmark tower at the Highbury Campus would be renamed Ayrton Tower in honour of Hertha Ayrton (1854–1923), the pioneering electrical engineer, physicist, inventor, and suffragette born in Portsea. Ayrton was selected following a public vote to recognise notable individuals from Portsmouth. The 10-storey tower, originally built in 1970, has been the focus of major refurbishment as part of a £4.84 million investment programme launched in 2022, with a further £2 million of work planned. The redevelopment includes upgraded teaching and learning spaces for T Level students, simulated facilities for health, social care, and childcare courses, new business and finance classrooms, and improvements to the building’s infrastructure and equipment. The tower also houses the college’s Honeypot Nursery.
