= Paul Waugh =

British politician

Paul Waugh MP
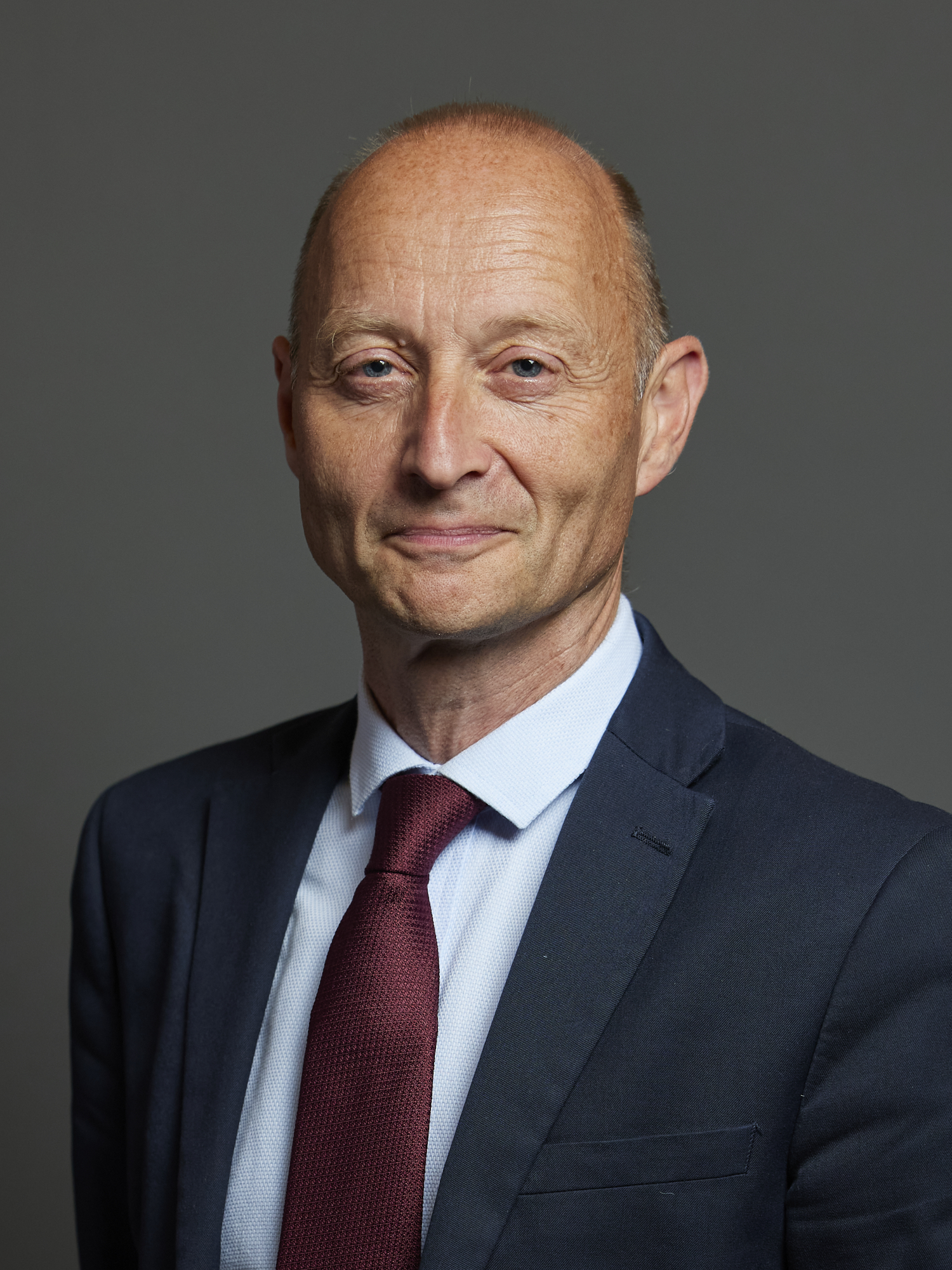
- Official portrait, 2024

Parliamentary Under-Secretary of State for Early Education
- Incumbent
- Assumed office 22 July 2026
- Prime Minister: Andy Burnham
- Preceded by: Olivia Bailey

Member of Parliament for Rochdale
- Incumbent
- Assumed office 4 July 2024
- Preceded by: George Galloway
- Majority: 1,440 (3.5%)

Personal details
- Born: 1966 or 1967 (age 59–60) Wardle, Lancashire, England
- Party: Labour Co-op
- Education: University of Oxford; University of Cardiff
- Occupation: Politician; journalist

Paul Waugh (born 1966 or 1967) is a British politician and journalist who has served as Parliamentary Under-Secretary of State for Early Education since 2026. He has been the Member of Parliament (MP) for Rochdale since 2024. Running under the Labour Co-op banner, he unseated George Galloway, the sole MP from the Workers Party of Britain, who had held the seat since a by-election five months earlier, on 29 February.

== Early life and education ==
Waugh was born in Wardle, Lancashire and raised on a council estate in Spotland, Rochdale. Educated at Meanwood Primary School, Redbrook Middle School and Oulder Hill Community School, he later studied philosophy and physiology at the University of Oxford and journalism at the University of Cardiff.

== Journalism career ==
Waugh has been political editor of HuffPost UK, editor of PoliticsHome and deputy political editor of The Independent, as well as the London Evening Standard. He also worked for the i newspaper and presented the Week in Westminster for the BBC.

== Political career ==
Waugh had put himself forward to be the Labour candidate for the 2024 Rochdale by-election but lost the nomination to Azhar Ali, who in turn was suspended from the party.

Waugh's wife works for the National Health Service, and he has said potential improvement of the health system was one of the major motivating factors in running for Parliament.

In the 2024 general election, he was elected as the Labour Co-op Member of Parliament for Rochdale. Waugh was critical of its previous MP George Galloway, labelling him as "Putin's parrot" and an extremist. Following his election to Parliament, Waugh was elected to the Culture, Media and Sport Select Committee.

On 22 July 2026, Andy Burnham appointed Waugh as Parliamentary Under-Secretary of State for Early Education, succeeding Olivia Bailey. He is the first MP for Rochdale to hold a departmental ministerial post since the constituency was created in 1832.

Parliament of the United Kingdom
| Preceded by George Galloway | Member of Parliament for Rochdale; 2024–present | Incumbent |
