= Tony Durant =

British politician

Sir Anthony Durant

Vice-Chamberlain of the Household
- In office 20 December 1988 – 25 July 1990
- Prime Minister: Margaret Thatcher
- Preceded by: Michael Neubert
- Succeeded by: David Lightbown

Member of Parliament for Reading West Reading North (1974–1983)
- In office 28 February 1974 – 8 April 1997
- Preceded by: Constituency recreated
- Succeeded by: Martin Salter

Personal details
- Born: Robert Anthony Bevis Durant; 9 January 1928
- Died: 18 February 2016 (aged 88)
- Party: Conservative

Sir Robert Anthony Bevis Durant (9 January 1928 – 18 February 2016), also known as Tony Durant, was a British Conservative Party politician.

== Political career ==
Durant stood unsuccessfully for Rother Valley in the 1970 general election; the seat was retained by Labour's Peter Hardy. In 1971 Durant supported Margaret Thatcher's decision to end free school milk on the grounds that many children did not like it.

He was the Member of Parliament for Reading North from 1974 to 1983. After Reading's constituencies underwent boundary changes, he was the Member of Parliament for Reading West from 1983 to 1997. During his time in the Commons, he acted as a Whip. Announced in the 1991 New Year Honours, he was knighted on 14 February 1991.

In 1994, he successfully campaigned for the lowering of the homosexual age of consent. He retired from politics at the 1997 UK general election.

Durant served as president of the Kennet and Avon Canal Trust and the River Thames Society, chairman of the Sports Aid Foundation’s southern region, as a governor of the British Film Institute, and a Freeman of the City of London and the Watermen and Lightermen’s Company.

Political offices
Preceded by Michael Neubert	Vice-Chamberlain of the Household; 1988 – 1990	Succeeded by David Lightbown
Parliament of the United Kingdom
New constituency	Member for Reading North; 1974–1983	Constituency abolished
New constituency	Member for Reading West; 1983–1997	Succeeded by Martin Salter
