= Reading West (constituency) =

UK Parliament constituency (1983–2024)

Coordinates: 51.46°N 0.99°W

- Former county constituency for the House of Commons
- Boundary of Reading West in Berkshire

- Location of Berkshire within England
- County: Berkshire
- Electorate: 73,006 (2018)
- Major settlements: Reading, Theale and Tilehurst

1983–2024
- Seats: One
- Created from: Reading North, Newbury and Reading South
- Replaced by: Earley and Woodley, Reading Central, Reading West and Mid Berkshire

Reading West was a constituency (Note: A borough constituency (for the purposes of election expenses and type of returning officer)) represented in the House of Commons of the UK Parliament. (Note: As with all constituencies, the constituency elects one Member of Parliament (MP) by the first past the post system of election at least every five years.)

Further to the completion of the 2023 Periodic Review of Westminster constituencies, the seat was abolished. Its area was transferred to the new constituencies of Earley and Woodley (Whitley ward), Reading Central (Battle, Minster and Southcote wards), and Reading West and Mid Berkshire (all other wards). These constituencies were first contested at the 2024 general election. (Note: For the purposes of this definition, the Electoral Commission appears to have used the borough ward names and definitions as existed prior to 2022 rather than the current names and definitions.)

== Constituency profile ==
Since its 1983 creation the constituency was a bellwether paradigm example of a marginal seat. Boundary changes for the 2010 election took in areas of population expansion to the east in new largely private sector housing estates. Unemployment is close to the regional average, which is lower than the national average and the constituency has seen a marked increase in properties and property prices throughout the 2001 to 2011 period which saw town centre regeneration and investment by a Labour Party-controlled council enhanced by Reading railway station hub improvements and enterprise areas equally.

== History ==
The Reading West parliamentary constituency was first contested in 1983, when it was won by a member of the Conservative Party, Tony Durant, the sitting MP for the abolished Reading North constituency. He held the seat through two subsequent general elections until he retired at the 1997 election.

The constituency was then won by Martin Salter for Labour, as part of the landslide that brought Labour back to power under Tony Blair. Salter held the seat through the 13 years of Labour government until Parliament was dissolved in April 2010, but did not stand in the 2010 general election, when Alok Sharma won the seat for the Conservatives.

Sharma held several posts within government, including serving in the Cabinet as the President for COP26 from January 2021 until October 2022.

== Boundaries and boundary changes ==
Map of boundaries 2010-2024

1983–1997

- The Borough of Reading wards of Battle, Katesgrove, Kentwood, Minster, Norcot, Southcote, and Tilehurst; and
- The District of Newbury wards of Calcot, Pangbourne, Purley, Theale, and Tilehurst.

Formed as a county constituency, largely from parts of the abolished constituency of Reading North. Extended westwards to include parts of Newbury.

1997–2010

- The Borough of Reading wards of Battle, Kentwood, Minster, Norcot, Southcote, Tilehurst, and Whitley; and
- The District of Newbury wards of Calcot, Pangbourne, Purley, Theale, and Tilehurst.

The boundary with Reading East was realigned, gaining Whitley ward and losing Katesgrove ward.

2010–2024

- The Borough of Reading wards of Battle, Kentwood, Minster, Norcot, Southcote, Tilehurst, and Whitley; and
- The District of West Berkshire wards of Birch Copse, Calcot, Pangbourne, Purley on Thames, Theale, and Westwood.

Marginal changes due to revision of local authority wards.

The constituency was bordered by the seats of Newbury, Henley, Reading East, and Wokingham.

== Members of Parliament ==
Election	Member	Party
1983	Tony Durant	Conservative
1997	Martin Salter	Labour
2010	Alok Sharma	Conservative

== Elections ==
=== Elections in the 2010s ===
General election 2019: Reading West
Party	Candidate	Votes	%	±%
Conservative	Alok Sharma	24,393	48.4	–0.5
Labour Co-op	Rachel Eden	20,276	40.2	–3.1
Liberal Democrats	Meri O'Connell	4,460	8.9	+3.0
Green	Jamie Whitham	1,263	2.5	+0.6
Majority		4,117	8.2	+2.6
Turnout		50,392	67.9	−1.6
Registered electors		74,623		
Conservative hold		Swing	+1.3	

General election 2017: Reading West
Party	Candidate	Votes	%	±%
Conservative	Alok Sharma	25,311	48.9	+1.2
Labour	Olivia Bailey	22,435	43.3	+9.3
Liberal Democrats	Meri O’Connell	3,041	5.9	+1.0
Green	Jamie Whitham	979	1.9	−1.0
Majority		2,876	5.6	−8.1
Turnout		51,766	69.5	+2.8
Registered electors		74,518		
Conservative hold		Swing	–4.1	

General election 2015: Reading West
Party	Candidate	Votes	%	±%
Conservative	Alok Sharma	23,082	47.7	+4.5
Labour	Victoria Groulef	16,432	34.0	+3.5
UKIP	Malik Azam	4,826	10.0	+6.8
Liberal Democrats	Meri O'Connell	2,355	4.9	−15.2
Green	Miriam Kennet	1,406	2.9	+1.7
Independent	Suzie Ferguson	156	0.3	New
TUSC	Neil Adams	83	0.2	New
Roman	Philip West	64	0.1	New
Majority		6,650	13.7	+1.0
Turnout		48,404	66.7	+0.8
Registered electors		72,302		
Conservative hold		Swing	+0.5	

General election 2010: Reading West
Party	Candidate	Votes	%	±%
Conservative	Alok Sharma	20,523	43.2	+9.6
Labour	Naz Sarkar	14,519	30.5	−14.5
Liberal Democrats	Daisy Benson	9,546	20.1	+4.3
UKIP	Bruce Hay	1,508	3.2	+0.4
Common Sense	Howard Thomas	852	1.8	New
Green	Adrian Windisch	582	1.2	−1.0
Majority		6,004	12.6	N/A
Turnout		47,530	65.9	+4.7
Registered electors		72,118		
Conservative gain from Labour		Swing	+12.1	

=== Elections in the 2000s ===
2005 notional result
Party	Vote	%
Labour	19,451	45.1
Conservative	14,496	33.6
Liberal Democrats	6,814	15.8
Others	2,385	5.5
Turnout	43,146	61.2
Electorate	70,529	

General election 2005: Reading West
Party	Candidate	Votes	%	±%
Labour	Martin Salter	18,940	44.9	−8.3
Conservative	Ewan Cameron	14,258	33.8	+1.7
Liberal Democrats	Denise Gaines	6,663	15.8	+3.0
UKIP	Peter Williams	1,180	2.8	+0.8
Green	Adrian Windisch	921	2.2	New
Veritas	Dave Boyle	267	0.6	New
Majority		4,672	11.1	−10.0
Turnout		42,229	61.2	+2.1
Registered electors		69,011		
Labour hold		Swing	−5.0	

General election 2001: Reading West
Party	Candidate	Votes	%	±%
Labour	Martin Salter	22,300	53.1	+8.0
Conservative	Stephen Reid	13,451	32.0	−6.9
Liberal Democrats	Polly Martin	5,387	12.8	+0.1
UKIP	David Black	848	2.0	+1.4
Majority		8,849	21.1	+14.9
Turnout		41,986	59.1	−11.0
Registered electors		71,089		
Labour hold		Swing	+7.4	

=== Elections in the 1990s ===
General election 1997: Reading West
Party	Candidate	Votes	%	±%
Labour	Martin Salter	21,841	45.1	+16.5
Conservative	Nicholas Bennett	18,844	38.9	−13.4
Liberal Democrats	Dee Tomlin	6,153	12.7	−5.1
Referendum	Steven G Brown	976	2.0	New
BNP	Ian Dell	320	0.7	New
UKIP	David M Black	255	0.5	New
Majority		2,997	6.2	N/A
Turnout		48,389	70.1	−7.3
Registered electors		69,073		
Labour gain from Conservative		Swing	+15.0	

1992 notional result
Party	Vote	%
Conservative	27,888	52.4
Labour	15,256	28.7
Liberal Democrats	9,461	17.8
Others	638	1.2
Turnout	53,243	77.3
Electorate	68,848	

General election 1992: Reading West
Party	Candidate	Votes	%	±%
Conservative	Tony Durant	28,048	52.9	−2.4
Labour	PM Ruhemann	14,750	27.8	+6.6
Liberal Democrats	KH Lock	9,572	18.1	−4.3
Green	PJ Unsworth	613	1.2	+0.1
Majority		13,298	25.1	−7.8
Turnout		52,983	78.0	+5.8
Registered electors		67,937		
Conservative hold		Swing	−4.5	

=== Elections in the 1980s ===
General election 1987: Reading West
Party	Candidate	Votes	%	±%
Conservative	Tony Durant	28,122	55.3	+3.2
Liberal	Keith Lock	11,369	22.4	−5.9
Labour	Michael Orton	10,819	21.3	+2.0
Green	EP Wilson	542	1.1	New
Majority		16,753	32.9	+9.1
Turnout		50,852	72.2	−0.2
Registered electors		70,391		
Conservative hold		Swing	+4.7	

General election 1983: Reading West
Party	Candidate	Votes	%	±%
Conservative	Tony Durant	24,948	52.1	+4.1
Liberal	James Day	13,549	28.3	+8.7
Labour	Richard Evans	9,220	19.3	–12.2
Independent	E Lilley	161	0.3	New
Majority		11,399	23.5	+7.3
Turnout		47,878	72.5	
Registered electors		66,080		
Conservative hold		Swing	–2.3	

1979 notional result
Party	Vote	%
Conservative	24,628	48.0
Labour	16,144	31.5
Liberal	10,056	19.6
Others	492	1.0
Turnout	51,320	
Electorate		

== See also ==
- List of parliamentary constituencies in Berkshire
