= Portsmouth College =

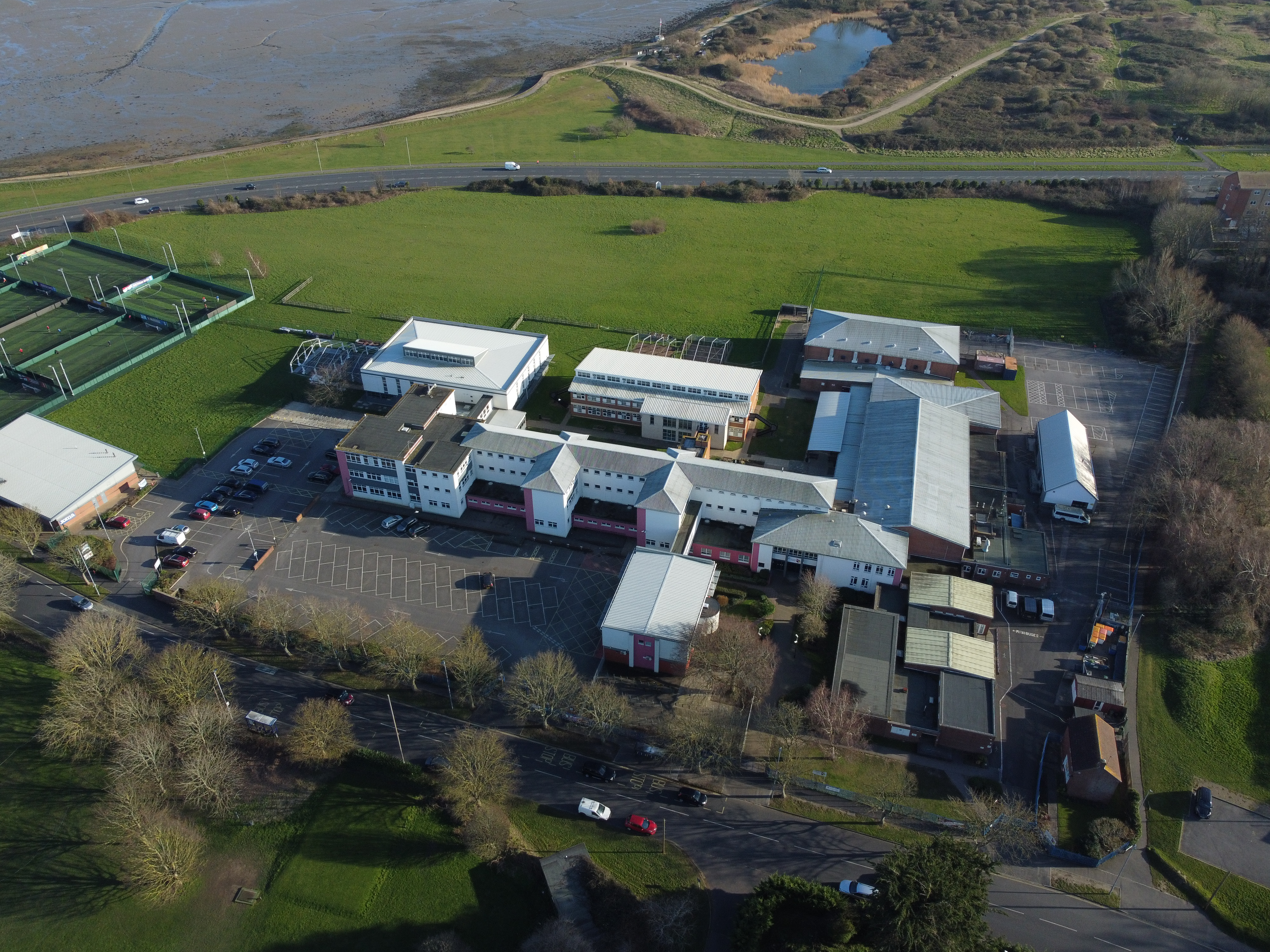

Location
- Tangier Road; Portsmouth, Hampshire, PO3 6PZ; England
- Coordinates: 50.808322°N 1.045800°W

Information
- Type: Further education college
- Motto: Make It Happen
- Local authority: South East England YPLA (although in Portsmouth LEA)
- Department for Education URN: 130706 Tables
- Ofsted: Reports
- Principal: Katy Quinn
- Gender: Mixed
- Age: 15 to 19+
- Former name: Southern Grammar School for Boys
- Website: https://www.city-of-portsmouth-college.ac.uk/

Portsmouth College was a sixth form college on Tangier Road, Baffins, in the city of Portsmouth, England.

In 2021 the college merged with Highbury College to form City of Portsmouth College.

== Admissions ==
The principal at Portsmouth College was Simon Barrable. The college was located just off the Eastern Road which provides an easy way to get to the college from inside and outside the city. This was near the A2030 east of Baffins, south of Great Salterns lake and golf course. It was one of two post-16 colleges in Portsmouth, the other being Highbury College. Comprehensive schools in Portsmouth do not have sixth forms.

== History ==
The site of Portsmouth College started out as marsh land on the edge of Portsmouth and was reclaimed in 1705. One name for the area, Salterns, reflects its past use for salt pans, evaporating salt water to make salt. In 1884, there was approximately 4 salt.

In November 1888 Portsmouth Higher Grade School was formed. It was later to become a boys' grammar school before becoming a comprehensive and then becoming a college.

=== Grammar school ===
It became the Southern Grammar School for Boys after moving from Highland Road in 1956.

=== Comprehensive school ===
Great Salterns Secondary School was formed in 1975, a coeducational comprehensive school

=== Sixth form college ===
In 1984 secondary education in Portsmouth was reorganised. All the existing comprehensive schools lost their sixth forms, which were combined into a new sixth form college in the buildings previously belonging to Great Salterns School.

Portsmouth College provided a variety of courses from GCSEs, A – Levels, and BTECs in a wide range of subjects. The college had a Computing and Library facility with high speed network with Internet connections. There were a wide range of computer facilities available to students.

The college had a good drama section which had its own studio theatre which had sound and light systems, along with a full sized dance studio with mirrors. The college provided education for anyone of any age and there are many subjects taught at the college including Physics, Art, Graphic Design, Chemistry, Sport, Biology, Geography, Leisure, Travel and Tourism, Drama, Dance, Performing Arts and many others.

=== Former teachers ===
- Anthony Tuckwell, Headmaster from 1984 to 1999 of King Edward VI Grammar School (taught history from 1966 to 1969 at the boys' school)

== Academic results ==
The college won the 2009 Beacon Award by the AoC for the College School Partnerships. It gets A-level results under the England average.

The most recent Ofsted inspection graded the college as 'satisfactory' and noted that "success rates are rising but they are still below national averages for sixth form colleges".

== Alumni ==
=== Southern Grammar School for Boys ===
- Prof James Barber, Ernst Chain Professor of Biochemistry since 1989 at Imperial College London
- Raymond Blackman MBE, Editor from the 1949–50 until the 1972–3 edition of Jane's Fighting Ships
- Robert Brash, Ambassador to Indonesia from 1984 to 1988
- Prof George Butterworth, Professor of Psychology from 1991 to 2000 at the University of Sussex, and Editor from 1988 to 1994 of the British Journal of Developmental Psychology
- Donald Davies CBE, computing pioneer, who invented packet switching, a central foundation of the architecture of Internet, at the National Physical Laboratory in the late 1960s
- Roy Koerner (Fritz) MBE, PhD Scientist and explorer (with Wally Herbert) and glaciologist, worked with the Polar Continental Shelf Project, and of worldwide importance for his 'ice core' data (oxygen isotope ratio cycle) that dated back over 11,000 years, to show summer-melt layers with relevant carbon dioxide content in the air. Ice thickness Data gathered during PolaR expeditions is still used as calibration for global warming survey
- Christopher le Brun, painter
- Prof David Marks, Professor of Psychology from 2000 to 2010 at City University London
- Ian Mikardo, Labour MP from 1945 to 1987
- Alan Pascoe MBE, 400m hurdler
- Rear-Adm David Sherval CB
- Derek Shulman, musician with Simon Dupree and the Big Sound
- General Sir John Stibbon OBE, Chief Royal Engineer from 1993 to 1999
- Keith Thomas CB OBE, chief executive from 1979 to 1983 of Royal Navy Dockyards and of the Royal Corps of Naval Constructors

=== Portsmouth College ===
- Leadley, singer-songwriter, présenter, and YouTuber
- Stephen Morgan, Labour MP
- Alexander Evans (diplomat), former Deputy and Acting High Commissioner to India
