= Highbury College =

- Portsmouth, Hampshire, PO6 2SA; England

Information
- Type: General further education college
- Motto: 'To enable all our students to succeed'
- Established: 1963
- Department for Education URN: 130697 Tables
- Ofsted: Reports
- Chair of Governors: Rob Nitsch
- Principal & CEO: Katy Quinn
- Gender: Mixed
- Age: 14+
- Ofsted: Grade 3 Requires Improvement (2018)
- Website: http://www.copc.ac.uk

Highbury College was a further education college in Portsmouth, Hampshire, England, that merged with Portsmouth College to form City of Portsmouth College in 2021. It offered vocational and academic education and training, including apprenticeships, A-levels and foundation degrees.

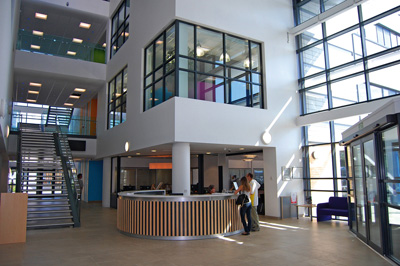
The college was inspected by Ofsted in May 2018 and was judged to be Grade 3 Requires Improvement.

The college was a member of the Collab Group of further education institutions, and achieved Training Quality Standard (TQS) accreditation Part A (whole College) with excellence in Building Services Engineering (Part B). Highbury occupied three centres: Highbury Campus, Highbury Northarbour Centre and Highbury Arundel Centre. In addition, marine engineering (boatbuilding) courses and apprenticeships were located in Boathouse 4 in The Portsmouth Historic Dockyards.

The college also provided apprenticeship training in the Southeast and offered apprenticeships in more than 40 subject areas.

The college underwent a major redevelopment of accommodation and facilities and completed a £56.4m building programme across the City of Portsmouth, culminating in the opening of the new Highbury Campus by Princess Anne in October 2009.

In 2019, Penny Wycherley took over Stella Mbubaegbu's responsibilities as Principal and CEO at Highbury College. Following the merger in 2021, Katy Quinn became Principal and CEO.

== Areas of learning ==
- Access to Higher Education
- Art & Design
- Automotive Studies
- Beauty & Holistic Therapies
- Business, Admin & Financial Services
- Computing
- Construction & Built Environment
- Childcare & Early Years
- Engineering
- English for Speakers of Other Languages (ESOL)
- Fashion
- Floristry
- GCSE
- Hairdressing
- Health & Social Care
- Catering
- Independent Living & Work Skills
- Media & Journalism
- Occupational Health & Safety
- Public Services
- Skills for Life
- Teacher Training, including Certificate in Education and CELTA
- Travel & Tourism

The college also offers a range of university level courses:

- Higher National Certificate & Higher National Diploma courses
- Certificates in Further and Higher Education
- Professional Vocational Qualifications

== Origins ==
The history of Highbury College can be traced back to the Borough of Portsmouth and Gosport School of Science and Art, a privately funded organisation that was founded in 1870. The main function of the school was to train dockworkers and engineers.

In 1894, the school's science and technology courses were brought under the control of the local authorities as the Borough of Portsmouth Municipal Technical Institute. The Institute had three main departments: Chemistry, Mathematics & Physics, and Civil & Mechanical Engineering. Most students attended evening courses. By 1903, subjects taught included hygiene, biology, physiology, woodcarving, navigation, nautical astronomy and dressmaking.

In 1908, the institute was renamed the Portsmouth Municipal College. Within a few years the college was offering external degree courses recognised by the University of London. The Municipal College was designated a regional College by the Department of Education and Science in the 1950s and renamed the Portsmouth College of Technology.

As a result of the continued expansion of adult and technical education the Local Education Authority (LEA) decided to establish a branch college at Cosham, which provided wider access to Portsmouth and the surrounding areas. This was intended to enable the Portsmouth College of Technology to concentrate on courses at graduate and postgraduate level, which it has done ever since – initially as Portsmouth Polytechnic and more recently as the University of Portsmouth.

== Official opening ==
Highbury College was officially opened on 17 September 1963 as Highbury Technical College. Built at a cost of £590,700, the college was originally designed for a student population of 2,800, but 5,000 students enrolled in the first year. To solve overcrowding, the college leased huts at Rugby Camp, Hilsea, for use as temporary classrooms. These were referred to as the 'Army Camp' by students and staff alike.

The college opened with 78 full-time teaching staff and six departments: Building & Surveying, Commerce & General Studies, Domestic Studies, Engineering, Mathematics & Science and Hotel & Catering. It concentrated on vocational and non-degree level courses so that it would not compete with Portsmouth College of Technology, which later became the University of Portsmouth. In its first year the college offered courses at craft and technician, and higher technician levels, leading to full technological certificates awarded through the City & Guilds. In addition, students could study for O Levels and A Levels, as well as Ordinary National Certificates and Diplomas. Higher National Certificates (HNCs) in Building and Civil Engineering were offered part-time.

A new block for science teaching was officially opened on 9 February 1966 by Reginald Prentice, then Minister of State for the Department of Education.

== History ==
A major extension was completed in 1970, which included a 10-storey Tower.

In 1970, responsibility for the Dockyard Technical College was transferred from the Ministry of Defence to the Local Education Authority, resulting in another 700 students for Highbury.

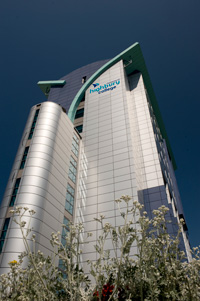
A major extension was completed in 1970, which included a 10-storey Tower

Alongside the new accommodation, Highbury acquired new equipment including a radiological laboratory, a digital computer, and a closed-circuit television (CCTV) studio, which included a broadcast news studio that was able to send programmes to 40 classrooms throughout the college.

By 1971, the college had expanded to ten departments, with 324 full-time teaching staff. Most significantly, Portsmouth Technical College's Hotel & Catering Department was taken over by Highbury when the Technical College assumed polytechnic status.

In 1974, Highbury welcomed its first visitors from Friedrich Albert Lange Vocational College, Duisburg in Germany.

Student numbers rose steadily over the decade and by 1976 student enrolment reached 10,000.

In the late 1970s, the college was approved by the Council for Academic Awards to offer degree courses jointly with Portsmouth Polytechnic, the first of which was a Degree in Hotel and Catering Studies. In recognition of this the college changed its name to Highbury College of Technology in 1978.

In 1982, the former Naval Dockyard Apprentice Training Centre came under civilian management and, as the Unicorn Training Centre, began a transition to a multi-skills training centre for apprentices, school leavers and the unemployed. Highbury took over the new facility in 1983, using it to teach students and apprentices in construction and electrical/electronic trades.
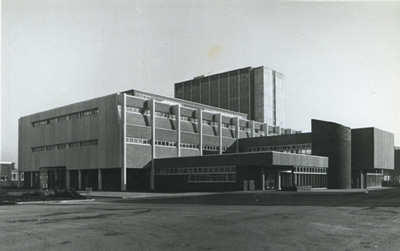

== Since 2000 ==
On 1 April 2005, Highbury came under the control of Highbury College Corporation.

In 2000, the completion of a £2.2m refurbishment project resulted in new library facilities and the re-cladding of college blocks and the Tower.

== Marine training programmes ==
Highbury College provides a range of vocational and academic programs in and around Portsmouth including Marine Apprenticeship, Boat Construction Maintenance, and Yacht Maintenance. These courses are delivered at the Solent Marine Academy, located in Boathouse4 within the Portsmouth Historic Dockyard.
