= Parliamentary Under-Secretary of State for Early Education =

Minister of the British Government for children

United Kingdom Parliamentary Under-Secretary of State for Early Education
- Royal Arms of His Majesty's Government

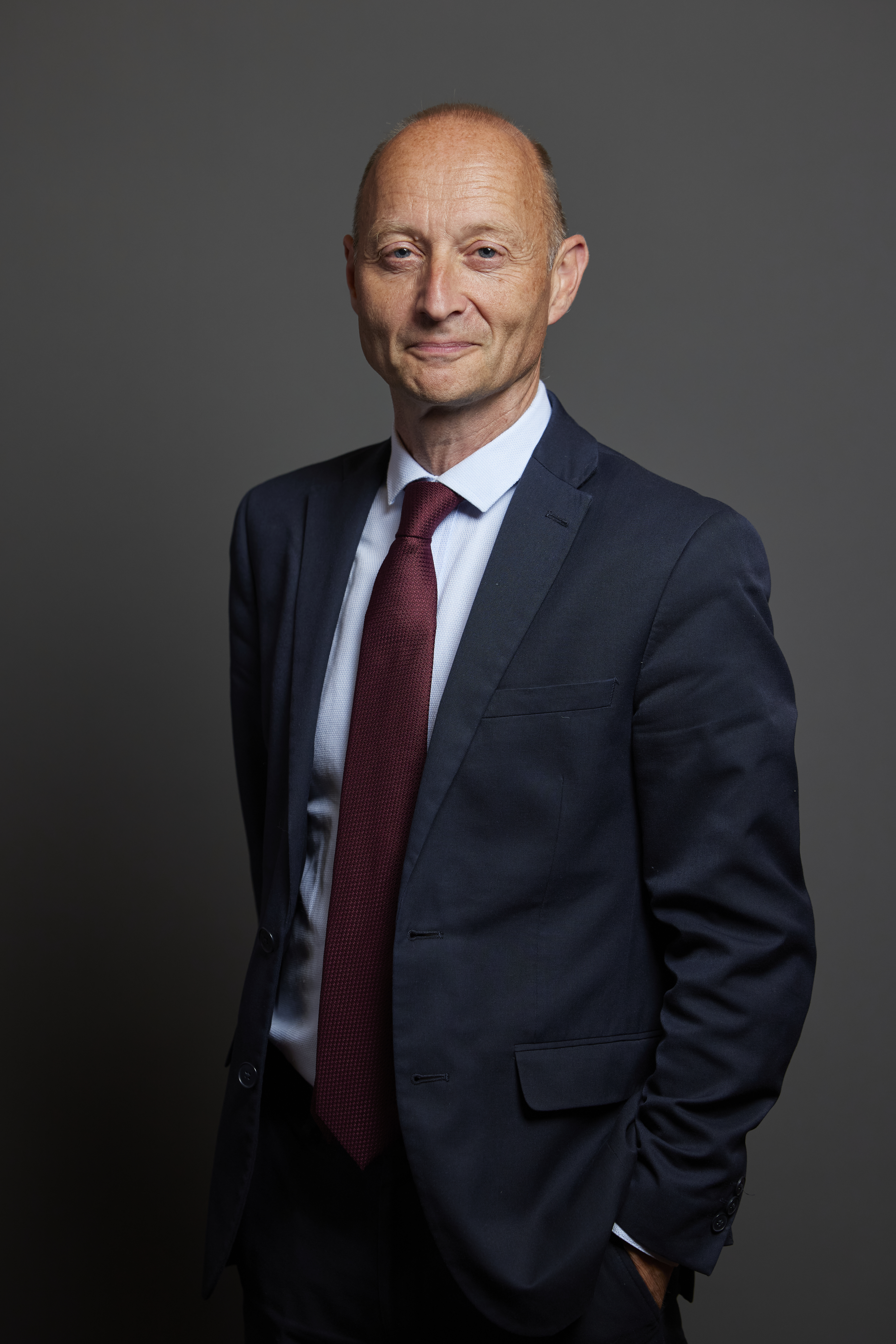
- Incumbent; Paul Waugh since 22 July 2026
- Department for Education
- Style: Minister
- Nominator: Prime Minister of the United Kingdom
- Appointer: The Monarch; on advice of the Prime Minister
- Term length: At His Majesty's pleasure
- Website: https://www.gov.uk/government/ministers/parliamentary-under-secretary-of-state--256

The office of Parliamentary Under-Secretary of State for Early Education, is a junior ministerial position in the Department for Education, previously the Department for Children, Schools and Families and Department for Education and Skills, in the Government of the United Kingdom.

The office of Parliamentary Under-Secretary of State for Early Education was established after the 2024 United Kingdom general election, with Stephen Morgan being the first office holder.

== Responsibilities ==
The minister’s responsibilities include:

- early years education including for children with special educational needs and disabilities (SEND)
- childcare and the home learning environment
- early years workforce
- early communication skills and early intervention
- breakfast clubs
- school food, including free school meals
- independent schools
- maintenance and improvement of the education estate
- environmental sustainability in the education sectors
- school attendance, including register of children who are not in school
- mental health support in schools
- safeguarding, online safety and prevention of serious violence in schools and post-16 settings
- counter extremism in schools and post-16 settings
- behaviour, preventing bullying and exclusions in schools
- use of data, digital technology and artificial intelligence (AI) in education
- use of research, science and evidence within the Department for Education

== Previous officeholders ==
The individuals who have held the office of Minister for Early Education, their terms and under which Prime Minister.

Name	Term start	Term end	Political party	Prime Minister
Stephen Morgan	9 July 2024	7 September 2025	Labour	Keir Starmer
Olivia Bailey	7 September 2025	22 July 2026	Labour	Keir Starmer
Paul Waugh	22 July 2026	Incumbent	Labour Co-op	Andy Burnham
