= Baffins =

Suburb of Portsmouth, Hampshire, England

Coordinates: 50°48′25″N 1°03′24″W

- Suburb
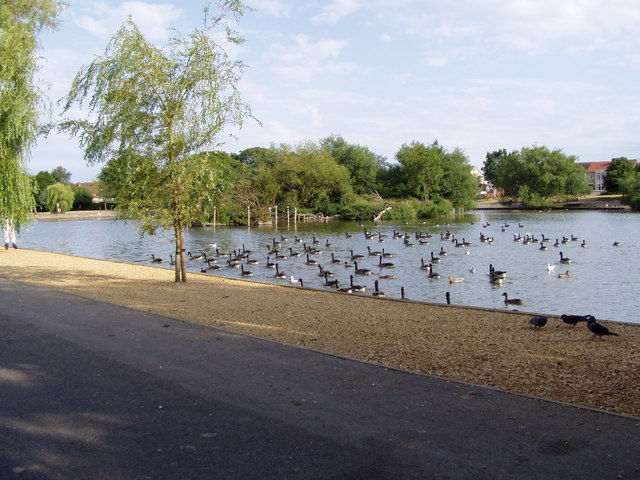
- Baffins Pond
- Population: 15,121 (2011 Census. Baffins Ward)
- Unitary authority: Portsmouth
- Ceremonial county: Hampshire
- Region: South East
- Country: England
- Sovereign state: United Kingdom
- Post town: PORTSMOUTH
- Postcode district: PO3
- Dialling code: 023
- Police: Hampshire and Isle of Wight
- Fire: Hampshire and Isle of Wight
- Ambulance: South Central
- UK Parliament: Portsmouth South

Baffins is an administrative district of Portsmouth, England, located on the eastern side of Portsea Island. The district is mainly composed of 1930s housing. The population of the Baffins ward at the 2011 Census was 15,121.

Before the area became developed for housing, it had been occupied by a farm of the same name. This farm (known as Bavins Farm) had a history stretching back to the 12th century. The only surviving remnants of the rural past are Baffins Pond and the adjoining Tangier Field - a large open space between Baffins Pond and Portsmouth College at the eastern end of the field.

== Local attractions: Baffins Pond and Tangier Field ==
Baffins Pond and Tangier Field is 182,000 square metres (18.2 hectares). The large natural pond is a habitat for ducks, geese, swans and other wild fowl. It is managed as a wildlife refuge and is popular with people of all ages. In 2014 Baffins Pond again received a Green Flag award.

There is also a play area at Baffins Pond with equipment for children of all ages as well as a ball-court with basketball and 5-a-side goals.

To the east of the pond area is Tangier Field, a large grassed open space that also serves as a valuable habitat for the brent goose or brant goose, an internationally important protected species, which visits the Solent area in the winter months. There is no public access to the fenced enclosure between 1 October to 31 March for the time the birds are resident, although most of the area is open to the public at all times.

== Local amenities ==
The local shopping area for Baffins is in Tangier Road. The many shops and businesses include a post office within the Co-op store, newsagents, butchers, a greengrocer, a pharmacist, numerous take-aways, and 'The Baffins' pub. The Alderman Lacey Library is at the edge of Baffins Pond.

There are two churches in Tangier Road: St Joseph's Catholic Church and a City Life Church. St Cuthbert's Church is located in Hayling Avenue which borders Baffins Pond on its southern side. There is also a GP (the Baffins Surgery) next to this church.

Baffins is also within short walking distance of St. Mary's Hospital which includes a minor injuries/illness walk-in centre St. Marys Treatment Centre

== Education ==
The Baffins area is served by Langstone Infant and Junior School, Westover Primary School, Admiral Lord Nelson School and Milton Cross Academy as well as Portsmouth College (formerly the Great Salterns Comprehensive School; prior to co-education and secondary school amalgamations in the 1970s it was Southern Grammar School for boys).
