= List of United Kingdom MPs: Y =

Following is a list of past and present Members of Parliament (MPs) of the Parliament of the United Kingdom whose surnames begin with Y.

Colour key: Conservative Labour Liberal Liberal Democrats Scottish Unionist Party Tory Whigs

Name	Image	Party	First elected	Constituency	Notes
Yuan Yang		Labour	2024	Earley and Woodley	
Sir John Yarde-Buller		Conservative	1835	South Devon (1835–1858)	Later ennobled as Baron Churston
Mohammad Yasin		Labour	2017	Bedford (2017-present)	
Sir Charles Yate 1st Baronet Yate		Conservative	1910	Melton (1910–1924)	
John Ashton Yates		Whig	1837	County Carlow (1837–1841)	
Victor Yates		Labour	1945	Birmingham, Ladywood (1945-1969)	Died in office
William Yates		Conservative	1955	The Wrekin (1955-1966)	Later became Member of the Australian Parliament
James Yeaman		Liberal	1873	Dundee (1873–1880)	
William Henry Yelverton		Whig	1832	Carmarthen Boroughs (1832–1835)	High Sheriff of Carmarthenshire (1853)
Sir Alfred Yeo		Liberal	1914	Poplar (1914–1918) Poplar South (1918–1922)	Mayor of Poplar (1903–04)
Frank Ash Yeo		Liberal	1885	Gower (1885 –1888)	Died in office
Tim Yeo		Conservative	1983	South Suffolk (1983–2015)	Chairman of the Energy and Climate Change Select Committee (2010–15) Shadow Secretary of State for Environment and Transport (2004–05) Shadow Secretary of State for Public Services, Health and Education (2003–04) Shadow Secretary of State for Trade and Industry (2002–03) Shadow Secretary of State for Culture, Media and Sport (2001–02)
Robert Yerburgh		Conservative	1886	Chester (1886–1906;1910–1916)	
Robert Yerburgh		Conservative	1922	South Dorset (1922–1929)	
Sir George Yonge 5th Baronet Yonge		N/A	1801	Old Sarum (1801)	Master of the Mint (1794–1799) Secretary at War (1782–83;1783–94) Governor of the Cape Colony (1799–1801) Also member of Parliament of Great Britain
Christopher York		Conservative	1939	Ripon (1939–1950) Harrogate (1950–1954)	High Sheriff of Yorkshire (1966–67)
Charles Yorke		Tory	1831	Reigate (1831–1832) Cambridgeshire (1832–1834)	Lord Privy Seal (1858–59) Postmaster General (1852) Lord Lieutenant of Cambridgeshire (1835–73) Later ennobled as the 4th Earl of Hardwicke
Charles Philip Yorke		Tory	1801	Cambridgeshire (1801–1810) St Germans (1810–1812) Liskeard (1812–1818)	First Lord of the Admiralty (1810–12) Teller of the Exchequer (1813–34) Home Secretary (1803–04)
Eliot Yorke		Conservative	1835	Cambridgeshire (1835–1865)	
Eliot Constantine Yorke		Conservative	1974	Cambridgeshire (1974-1978)	
Henry Redhead Yorke		Whig	1841	City of York (1841–1848)	Died in office
John Yorke		Conservative	1864	Tewkesbury (1864–1868;1885–1886) East Gloucestershire (1872–1885)	High Sheriff of Gloucestershire (1892–1893)
Joseph Yorke		Tory	1831	Reigate (1831-1832)	
Sir Joseph Sydney Yorke		Tory	1801	Reigate (1801–1806;1818–1831) St Germans (1806–1810) West Looe (1812-1812) Sandwich (1812–1818)	First Naval Lord (1813–1816) Also member of the Parliament of Great Britain
Simon Yorke		Tory	1801	Grantham (1801–1802)	High Sheriff of Denbighsire (1807–08) Also member of the Parliament of Great Britain
Adolphus William Young		Liberal	1857	Great Yarmouth (1857–1859) Helston (1865–1866;1868–1880)	
Andrew Young		Labour Co-operative	1923	Glasgow Partick (1923–1924)	
Sir Arthur Young 1st Baronet of Patrick		Scottish Unionist Party	1950	Glasgow Partick (1935–1950) Glasgow Scotstoun (1950–1950)	Vice-Chamberlain of the Household (1944) Lord Commissioner of the Treasury (1942–44)
Charles Young		Conservative	1885	Christchurch (1885–1892)	
Claire Young		Liberal Democrat	2024	Thornbury and Yate	
David Young		Labour	1974	Bolton East (1974–1983) Bolton South East (1983–1997)	
Ernest Young		Liberal	1931	Middlesbrough East (1931–1935)	
Hilton Young		Liberal	1915	Norwich (1915–1923;1924–1929) Sevenoaks (1929–1935)	Minister of Health (1931–35) Financial Secretary to the Treasury (1921–22) Editor of the Financial News (1925–29) Later ennobled as 1st Baron Kennet
Sir Frederick William Young		Conservative	1918	Swindon (1918 – 1922)	Agent-General for South Australia (1915–18)
Sir George Young 6th Baronet of Formosa Place		Conservative	1974	Acton (1974–1983) Ealing Acton (1983–1997) North West Hampshire (1997–2015)	Chief Whip of the House of Commons (2012–14) Leader of the House of Commons and Lord Privy Seal (2010–12) Shadow Leader of the House of Commons (1998–2000;2009–10) Shadow Secretary of State for Defence (1997–98) Secretary of State for Transport (1995–97) Financial Secretary to the Treasury (1994–95) Comptroller of the Household (1990) Later ennobled as Lord Young of Cookham
George Young		Liberal	1865	Wigtown Burghs (1865–1874)	Solicitor General for Scotland (1862–66;1868–69) Lord Advocate (1869–74)
Jacob Young		Conservative	2019	Redcar (2019-present)	
John Young 2nd Baronet of Bailieborough Castle		Conservative	1831	Cavan (1831–1855)	Governor General of Canada (1869–72) Lord Lieutenant of Cavan (1871–76) Governor of New South Wales (1861–67) Chief Secretary for Ireland (1853–55) Parliamentary Secretary to the Treasury (1845–46) Financial Secretary to the Treasury (1844–45) Later ennobled as 1st Baron Lisgar
Richard Young		Liberal	1865	Cambridgeshire (1865–1868)	Mayor of Wisbech (1858–63)
Robert Young		Labour	1929	Islington North (1929–1931)	
Sir Robert Young		Labour	1918	Newton (1918–1931;1935–1950)	General Secretary of the Amalgamated Society of Engineers (1913–1919) Chairman of Ways and Means and Deputy Speaker of the House of Commons (1924;1929–31)
Oliver Young		Conservative	1898	Wokingham (1898–1901)	
William Young		Liberal	1910	East Perthshire (1910–1918) Perth (1918–1922)	
Sir William Young 4th Baronet of Dominica		Conservative	1835	Buckinghamshire (1835–1842)	
George Younger 1st Viscount Younger of Leckie		Scottish Unionist Party	1906	Ayr Burghs (1906–1922)	Lord Lieutenant of Stirlingshire (1925–29) Chairman of the Conservative Party (1916–1923)
George Younger 4th Viscount Younger of Leckie		Conservative	1964	Ayr (1964–1992)	Secretary of State for Defence (1986–89) Secretary of State for Scotland (1979–1986) Shadow Secretary of State for Defence (1975–76) Later ennobled as Baron Younger of Prestwick
Sir William Younger 1st Baronet of Auchen Castle		Conservative	1895	Stamford (1895–1906)	
Sir William Younger 1st Baronet of Auchen Castle		Liberal	1895	Peebles and Selkirk (1910–1910)	
Sir Kenneth Younger		Labour	1945	Great Grimsby (1945 –1959)	Shadow Home Secretary (1955–57)
Richard Younger-Ross		Liberal Democrat	2001	Teignbridge (2001 –2010)	
Sir James Yoxall		Liberal	1895	Nottingham West (1895–1918)	General Secretary of the National Union of Teachers (1892–1924) President of the National Union of Teachers (1892)
