= Holborn by-election =

Holborn by-election may refer to several by-elections in the Holborn area of London:

- 1888 Holborn by-election; see Holborn (UK Parliament constituency) § Elections
- 1892 Holborn by-election; see Holborn (UK Parliament constituency) § Elections
- 1900 Holborn by-election, following the death of Sir Charles Hall
- 1928 Holborn by-election, following the elevation to the peerage of James Remnant

== See also ==
- 2026 Holborn and St Pancras by-election, following the resignation of Sir Keir Starmer
