= Holborn (London County Council constituency) =

London County Council constituency

- Former constituency for the London County Council

Former constituency
- Created: 1889
- Abolished: 1949
- Member(s): 2
- Replaced by: Holborn and St Pancras South

Holborn was a constituency used for elections to the London County Council between 1889 and 1949. The seat shared boundaries with the UK Parliament constituency of the same name.

== Councillors ==
Year	Name	Party	Name	Party
1889	Alfred Hoare	Independent Progressive	Thomas William Maule	Progressive
1892	James Remnant	Moderate	Arthur Cowper Ranyard	Moderate
1895	James Remnant	Moderate	William Ward	Moderate
1898	James Remnant	Moderate	John Dickson-Poynder	Moderate
1901	H. W. Bliss	Conservative	George Swinton	Conservative
1907	Henry Lygon	Municipal Reform	Ernest Wild	Municipal Reform
1910	Henry Lygon	Municipal Reform	Robert Tasker	Municipal Reform
1914	Henry Hugh Tasker	Municipal Reform	Robert Tasker	Municipal Reform
1919	Henry Hugh Tasker	Municipal Reform	Eustace Percy	Municipal Reform
1922	George Harvey	Municipal Reform	Robert Tasker	Municipal Reform
1925	Bracewell Smith	Municipal Reform	Robert Tasker	Municipal Reform
1928	William George Burns	Municipal Reform	Robert Tasker	Municipal Reform
1931	Percy Hill	Municipal Reform	Robert Tasker	Municipal Reform
1937	Alfred Walter Scott	Municipal Reform	Theodore Magnus Wechsler	Municipal Reform

== Election results ==
1889 London County Council election: Holborn
Party	Candidate	Votes	%	±%
Independent Progressive	Alfred Hoare	1,436		
Progressive	Thomas William Maule	975		
Progressive	John Patrick Murrough	749		
Independent	William Robert Smith	712		
Independent	Edward James Gardiner	671		
Independent	Walter Manningdale Blott	234		
Independent Progressive win (new seat)				
Progressive win (new seat)				

1892 London County Council election: Holborn
Party	Candidate	Votes	%	±%
Moderate	Arthur Cowper Ranyard	2,602		
Moderate	James Remnant	2,545		
Independent Progressive	Alfred Hoare	2,173		
Independent Progressive	Frederick William Speaight	2,157		
Moderate gain from Progressive		Swing		
Moderate hold		Swing		

1895 London County Council election: Holborn
Party	Candidate	Votes	%	±%
Moderate	William Ward	3,262		
Moderate	James Remnant	3,255		
Progressive	R. Scott	1,683		
Progressive	H. J. Cohen	1,669		
Moderate hold		Swing		
Moderate hold		Swing		

1898 London County Council election: Holborn
Party	Candidate	Votes	%	±%
Moderate	James Remnant	3,117		
Moderate	John Dickson-Poynder	3,011		
Progressive	Alfred Hoare	1,325		
Moderate hold		Swing		
Moderate hold		Swing		

1901 London County Council election: Holborn
Party	Candidate	Votes	%	±%
Conservative	H. W. Bliss	2,146	37.4	−4.4
Conservative	George Swinton	2,135	37.2	−3.2
Progressive	Herman Cohen	1,464	25.5	+7.7
Conservative hold		Swing		
Conservative hold		Swing	-7.6	

1904 London County Council election: Holborn
Party	Candidate	Votes	%	±%
Conservative	H. W. Bliss	2,670		
Conservative	George Swinton	2,649		
Progressive	W. H. Ansell	1,241		
Progressive	Aubrey Goodes	1,169		
Majority				
Conservative hold		Swing		
Conservative hold		Swing		

1907 London County Council election: Holborn
Party	Candidate	Votes	%	±%
Municipal Reform	Ernest Wild	4,524		
Municipal Reform	Henry Lygon	4,030		
Progressive	H. Drysdale Woodcock	1,629		
Majority				
Municipal Reform hold		Swing		
Municipal Reform hold		Swing		

1910 London County Council election: Holborn
Party	Candidate	Votes	%	±%
Municipal Reform	Henry Lygon	3,324	35.0	
Municipal Reform	Robert Tasker	3,309	34.8	
Progressive	T. E. Morris	1,444	15.2	
Progressive	David Endacott	1,424	15.0	
Majority				
Municipal Reform hold		Swing		
Municipal Reform hold		Swing		

1913 London County Council election: Holborn
Party	Candidate	Votes	%	±%
Municipal Reform	Robert Tasker	3,719	37.3	+2.5
Municipal Reform	Henry Lygon	3,718	37.3	+2.3
Progressive	T. E. Morris	1,287	12.9	−2.3
Progressive	John Pascoe Elsden	1,255	12.6	−2.4
Majority		2,431	24.4	+4.8
Municipal Reform hold		Swing	-2.3	
Municipal Reform hold		Swing	-2.5	

1919 London County Council election: Holborn
Party	Candidate	Votes	%	±%
Municipal Reform	Henry Hugh Tasker	Unopposed	n/a	n/a
Municipal Reform	Eustace Percy	Unopposed	n/a	n/a
Municipal Reform hold		Swing	n/a	
Municipal Reform hold		Swing	n/a	

1922 London County Council election: Holborn
Party	Candidate	Votes	%	±%
Municipal Reform	Robert Tasker	5,234	46.2	n/a
Municipal Reform	George Harvey	5,143	45.4	n/a
Independent	H. Janner	947	8.4	n/a
Majority		4,196	37.0	n/a
Municipal Reform hold		Swing	n/a	
Municipal Reform hold		Swing	n/a	

1925 London County Council election: Holborn
Party	Candidate	Votes	%	±%
Municipal Reform	Robert Tasker	2,956		
Municipal Reform	Bracewell Smith	2,950		
Independent	Frances Wheeler-Smith	1,722		
Majority				
Municipal Reform hold		Swing		
Municipal Reform hold		Swing		

1928 London County Council election: Holborn
Party	Candidate	Votes	%	±%
Municipal Reform	Robert Tasker	4,141		
Municipal Reform	William George Burns	4,140		
Labour	R. W. H. Baker	1,049		
Labour	E. Howson	1,019		
Majority				
Municipal Reform hold		Swing		
Municipal Reform hold		Swing		

1931 London County Council election: Holborn
Party	Candidate	Votes	%	±%
Municipal Reform	Robert Tasker	4,349		
Municipal Reform	Percy Hill	4,333		
Labour	P. E. V. Hickinbottom	880		
Labour	Winifred Horrabin	863		
Majority				
Municipal Reform hold		Swing		
Municipal Reform hold		Swing		

1934 London County Council election: Holborn
Party	Candidate	Votes	%	±%
Municipal Reform	Robert Tasker	4,286		
Municipal Reform	Percy Hill	4,251		
Labour	P. E. V. Hickinbottom	1,619		
Labour	S. Seufert	1,528		
Majority				
Municipal Reform hold		Swing		
Municipal Reform hold		Swing		

1937 London County Council election: Holborn
Party	Candidate	Votes	%	±%
Municipal Reform	Alfred Walter Scott	5,398		
Municipal Reform	Theodore Magnus Wechsler	5,186		
Labour	George Cox	2,515		
Labour	P. E. A. Smith	2,367		
Majority				
Municipal Reform hold		Swing		
Municipal Reform hold		Swing		

1946 London County Council election: Holborn
Party	Candidate	Votes	%	±%
Conservative	Alfred Walter Scott	3,291		
Conservative	Theodore Magnus Wechsler	3,279		
Labour	Iris Bonham-Pigg	2,656		
Labour	Ewart Culpin	2,635		
Majority				
Conservative hold		Swing		
Conservative hold		Swing		
