= James Remnant =

James Remnant may refer to:

- James Remnant, 1st Baron Remnant (1862–1933), British politician
- James Remnant, 3rd Baron Remnant (1930–2022), British peer and banker
