= Claire van Straubenzee =

British charity director

- Occupation: Charity Director
- Spouse: Alexander van Straubenzee (m.1980)
- Relatives: Lawrence Kimball (Grandfather); Marcus Kimball (Uncle); Charlie van Straubenzee (Son); Thomas van Straubenzee (Son); Henry van Straubenzee (Father-in-law)
- Family: Straubenzee family (by marriage)
- Honours: MBE

Claire Sonia van Straubenzee (born Claire Sonia Fenwick; July 1954) is an English former charity director. In May 2024, Claire received an MBE for services to children’s education in Uganda.

== Career ==
In 2007, Claire van Straubenzee set up the Henry van Straubenzee Memorial Fund to support educating disadvantaged children in Uganda. The charity was co-run alongside her husband, Alexander van Straubenzee. This followed the death of Henry van Straubenzee, Claire’s second son, in a car crash near Ludgrove School, Berkshire in December 2002 where he was employed during his gap year. Henry had been due to travel onto Uganda to Bupadhengo School in Kamuli before commencing an undergraduate degree at the University of Newcastle upon the end of his gap year.

The charity’s first donation consisted of a private £3,000 donation by the van Straubenzees to Budaphengo school in Kamuli where Henry was meant to teach. In 2009, William, Prince of Wales, and Prince Harry, Duke of Sussex, became the charity’s joint patrons. As of 2024, this is the only charity to have their joint patronage. As of 2024, more than £3.3 million had been raised. During this time the charity helped over 35,000 children with more than 1,800 projects in 51 schools across southeastern Uganda.

Claire and Alexander van Straubenzee announced in a joint statement that the Henry van Straubenzee Memorial Fund would close at the end of 2024, with their final trip to Uganda occurring in February 2024. In May 2024, Claire van Straubenzee was awarded an MBE by William, Prince of Wales, in an investiture at Windsor Castle for services to children’s education in Uganda.

== Personal life ==
Claire van Straubenzee is the daughter of Anthony Fenwick and Caroline Kimball. Her grandfather was Major Lawrence Kimball, the Member of Parliament for Loughborough between 1931 and 1945. Her uncle was Marcus Richard Kimball, Baron Kimball, the Member of Parliament for Gainsborough between 1956 and 1983.

Van Straubenzee has two surviving sons, Thomas (b.1982) and Charles (b.1988), and one deceased son, Henry (b.1984, d.2002). Thomas is godfather to Princess Charlotte of Wales and Charles is godfather to Prince Archie of Sussex. Both brothers were ushers at the Wedding of Prince Harry and Meghan Markle. Following this, Prince Harry was the best man of Charles van Straubenzee during his wedding to Daisy Jenks in August 2018.
