= Wokingham by-election =

Wokingham by-election may refer to:

- 1898 Wokingham by-election
- 1901 Wokingham by-election
