= Straubenzee family =

British gentry family

The Straubenzee (van Straubenzee) family are an English and Canadian gentry family with Dutch origins. Members of the family across several generations have been notable for careers as officers within the British Army, with various members receiving decorations such as the Military Cross, Légion d'Honneur and the Distinguished Service Order, and others receiving chivalric orders including knighthoods.

In the 20th and 21st centuries, various members of the family were known for their political careers or philanthropic work, also receiving recognition in the form of knighthood/damehoods and Orders of the British Empire. The family are also known for their close ties within influential political, and more recently, royal circles, including William, Prince of Wales and Prince Harry, Duke of Sussex.

== Origins ==
The earliest known record of the Straubenzee family in the United Kingdom was when Philip William Casimir van Straubenzee left the Netherlands to support King George II in the Jacobite rising of 1745. During this time, he met Jane Turner of Kirkleatham, the daughter of Cholmley Turner, MP for Yorkshire, and married her. Straubenzee became a member of the British Army, and by request of George II was naturalised by Act of Parliament in 1759.

The Straubenzees were present in Spennithorne by the end of the 18th century, residing at Spennithorne House and surrounding properties.

== Notable people ==
Notable people with the surname include:

- Captain Philip William Casimir van Straubenzee (1723-1765), first of the Straubenzee family to become a British citizen
- Colonel Turner van Straubenzee JP DL (1746-1823), British Army officer who commanded the Loyal Dales Volunteers and afterwards the First North York Local Militia
- Lieutenant Colonel Henry van Straubenzee JP DL (1810-1892) married the Hon. Henrietta Wrottesley (1805–1893), daughter of John Wrottesley, 1st Baron Wrottesley
- General Sir Charles van Straubenzee GCB KCB CB (1812-1892), Commander of British Troops in China and Hong Kong, Governor of Malta, Lieutenant Governor of Hong Kong
- Colonel Bowen van Straubenzee (1829-1898), British Army officer
- Major-General Turner van Straubenzee CB (1838-1920), British Army officer, Commander of the Royal Artillery of the Indian Continent in the Egyptian campaign of 1882 and was COC of the Madras District 1891-1895
- Brigadier-General Casimir van Straubenzee CBE CB (1864-1943), British Army officer, GOC Infantry Brigade
- Major General Sir Casimir van Straubenzee KBE CB CMG (1867-1956), Canadian-born British Army officer. Commander of British forces in Singapore and Malaya, cricketer for Marylebone Cricket Club. He was also identified as the "Straubenzee" named in the Sherlock Holmes novel The Adventure of the Empty House.
- Lieutenant Colonel Charles Turner van Straubenzee (1876-1918), Canadian Army officer
- Eileen van Straubenzee, Lady Walwyn DBE (1883-1973), philanthropist
- Lieutenant-Colonel Alexander van Straubenzee DSO (with Bar) (1884-1952), British Army officer
- Brigadier Arthur van Straubenzee DSO MC (1891-1967), British Army officer, Royal Artillery
- Colonel Philip Turner van Straubenzee DSO JP DL (1912-2005), British Army officer
- Lieutenant Colonel Henry van Straubenzee DSO OBE (1914-2002), British Army officer and first class cricketer
- Major Sir William van Straubenzee MBE (1924-1999), British Conservative Party politician and Army Officer
- Philippa van Straubenzee, wife of Major Jeremy Whitaker, first employers of Lady Diana Spencer who worked for them as nanny, prior to her marriage to Prince Charles
- William van Straubenzee (born 1952) collaborated as one of Diana's closest friends on the ITV television programme aired in July 2017 entitled 'Diana, Our Mother: Her Life and Legacy'
- Claire van Straubenzee MBE (born 1954), English former charity director
- Thomas van Straubenzee (born 1982), godfather to Princess Charlotte of Wales who gave one of the Best Man speeches at the wedding of Prince William and Kate Middleton
- Henry George van Straubenzee (1984-2002), childhood best friend of Harry Duke of Sussex and inspiration for Henry van Straubenzee Memorial Fund
- Charlie van Straubenzee (born 1988), godfather to Prince Archie of Sussex, served as best man at the wedding of Prince Harry and Meghan Markle.

== See also ==
- Busby Hall
- Charles Innes-Ker, 11th Duke of Roxburghe
- Daisy Jenks
- Humphrey Walwyn
- Jeremy Whitaker
- Lady Melissa Percy
- List of British generals and brigadiers
- Philip VanKoughnet
- Thomas Emerson Headlam
