= Richard Stapley (politician) =

British businessman, philanthropist and Liberal Party politician

- Born: October 23, 1842
- Died: May 20, 1920 (aged 77)
- Spouse: Annie Jenner (m. 1866)

Sir Richard Stapley JP (23 October 1842 – 20 May 1920) was a British businessman, philanthropist and Liberal Party politician.

== Background ==
Stapley was born the son of Robert Stapley, of Twineham, Sussex. In 1866, he married Annie Jenner. He was knighted in 1908. In 1919 he founded the Sir Richard Stapley Educational Trust.

== Political career ==
Stapley was Liberal candidate for the Brixton division of Lambeth at the 1892 General Election. He was Liberal candidate for the Holborn division of Finsbury at the January 1910 General Election. He did not stand for parliament again. He was also a Justice of the Peace and a Member of Council of the City of London.

=== Electoral record ===
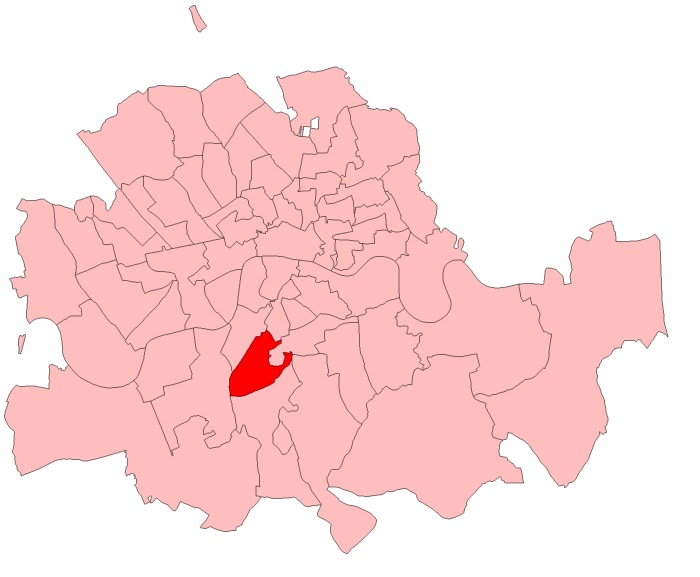
Brixton in London 1892

General Election 1892: Brixton
Party	Candidate	Votes	%	±%
Conservative	Marquess of Carmarthen	4,061	55.9	−0.4
Liberal	Richard Stapley	3,204	44.1	+0.4
Majority		857	11.8	−0.8
Turnout		9,789	74.2	+4.7
Conservative hold		Swing	-0.4	

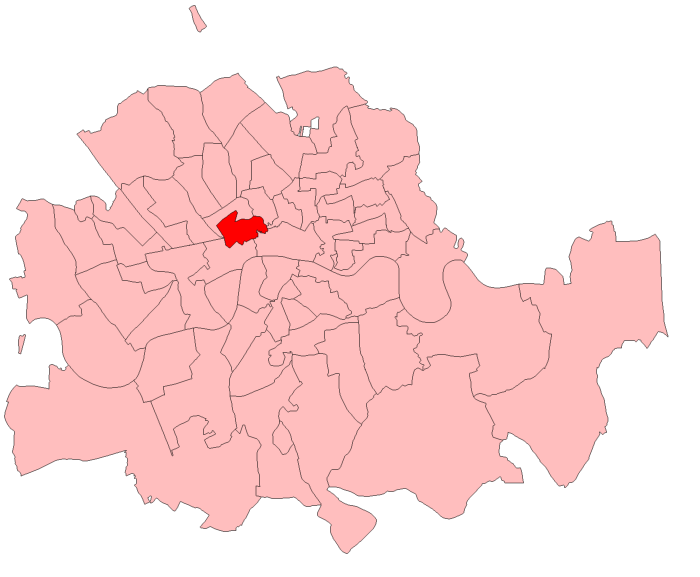
Holborn in London 1910

General Election January 1910: Holborn
Party	Candidate	Votes	%	±%
Conservative	James Farquharson Remnant	4,847	68.2	+9.3
Liberal	Sir Richard Stapley	2,262	31.8	−9.3
Majority		2,585	36.4	+18.6
Turnout			82.6	+11.3
Conservative hold		Swing	+9.3	
