= Peter Remnant =

British politician

The Hon. Peter Farquharson Remnant (21 September 1897 – 31 January 1968) was a British politician. He was the Conservative Member of Parliament (MP) for Wokingham from 1950 to 1959.

The son of James Remnant, 1st Baron Remnant, who was an MP from 1900 to 1928, Peter Remnant was educated at Ludgrove School, Eton College and Magdalen College, Oxford. He was first elected to Parliament in the 1950 general election for the newly recreated seat of Wokingham. He retired at the 1959 general election.

He played a first-class cricket match for the Minor Counties team in 1929, making 62 and a duck in his two innings. He played minor counties cricket for Berkshire. His brother, the 2nd Baron, was also a first-class cricketer.

During the First World War Remnant served with the Royal Garrison Artillery. He also served with the Royal Artillery during the Second World War where he reached the rank of lieutenant colonel.

Parliament of the United Kingdom
New constituency	Member of Parliament for Wokingham; 1950 – 1959	Succeeded by William van Straubenzee
