= Baron Remnant =

Baronetcy in the Baronetage of the United Kingdom

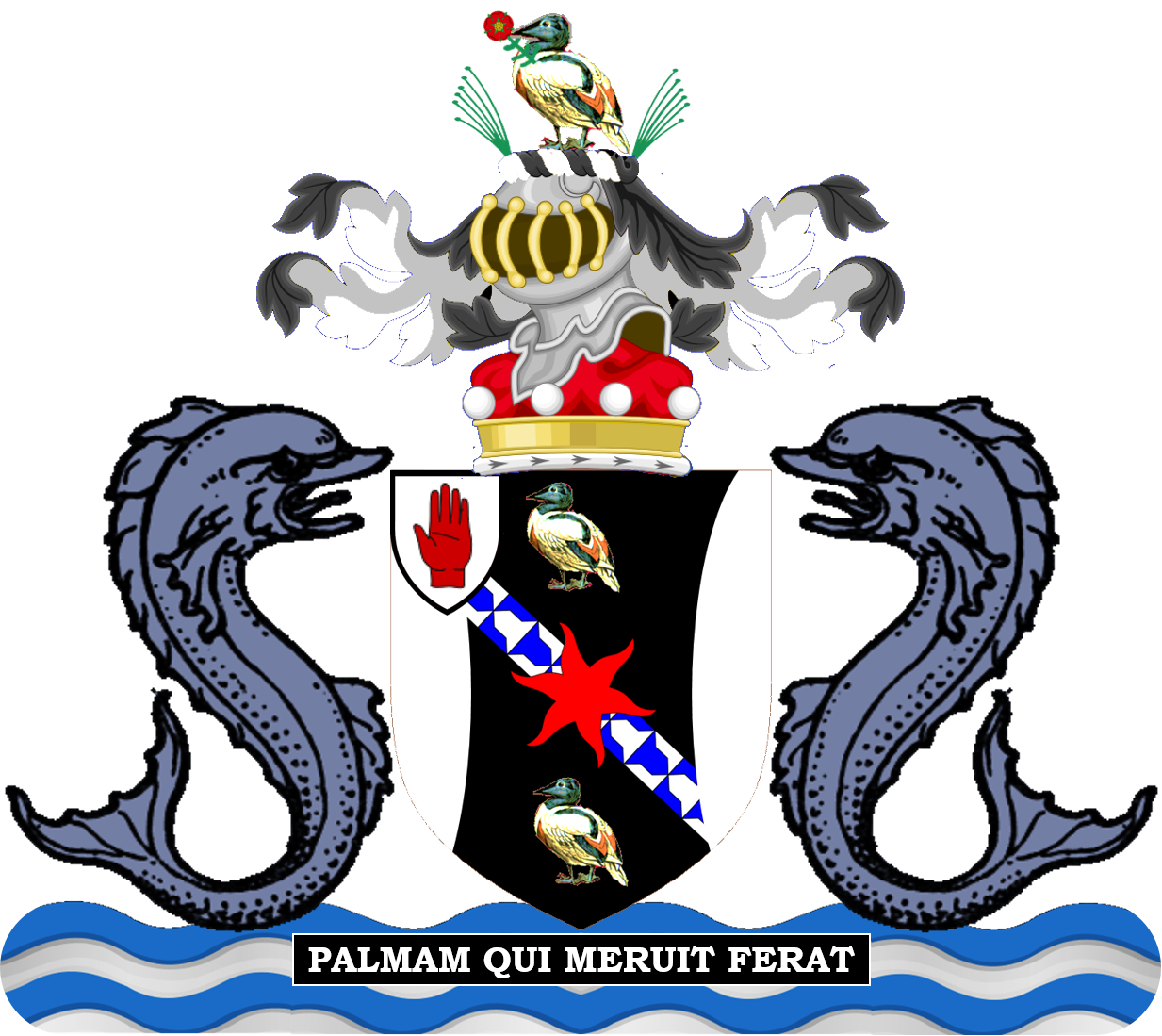
Arms: Sable a Bend Vair between two Sheldrakes proper all within two Flaunches Argent and charged with a Cinquefoil Gules; Crest: Between Rushes a Sheldrake proper holding in the beak a Rose Gules barbed seeded leaved and slipped proper; Supporters: On either side a Dolphin proper charged with a Cinquefoil Gules; Motto: Palmam Qui Meruit Ferat (Let him who has deserved the palm bear it)

Baron Remnant, of Wenhaston in the County of Suffolk, is a title in the Peerage of the United Kingdom. It was created on 26 June 1928 for the Conservative politician Sir James Remnant, 1st Baronet, who had previously represented Holborn in the House of Commons. He had already been created a Baronet, of Wenhaston in the County of Suffolk, on 14 July 1917. As of 2022 the titles are held by his great-grandson, the fourth Baron, who succeeded his father in that year.

== Remnant Baronets, of Wenhaston (1917) ==
- Sir James Farquharson Remnant, 1st Baronet (1862–1933)

See Barons Remnant for further Remnant Baronets, of Wenhaston.

== Barons Remnant (1928) ==
- James Farquharson Remnant, 1st Baron Remnant (1862–1933)
- Robert John Farquharson Remnant, 2nd Baron Remnant (1895–1967)
- James Wogan Remnant, 3rd Baron Remnant (1930–2022)
- Philip John Remnant, 4th Baron Remnant (b. 1954)

The heir apparent is the present holder's only son, Hon. Edward James Remnant (b. 1981)
The heir apparent's heir apparent is his son, Theodore Philip Noel Remnant (b. 2014).
