= Charlie van Straubenzee =

English businessman

- Born: Charles Anthony van Straubenzee; 1988 (age 37–38)
- Education: Ludgrove School; University of Newcastle upon Tyne
- Occupation: Businessman
- Spouse: Daisy Jenks (m. 2018)
- Children: 3
- Parents: Alexander van Straubenzee; Claire van Straubenzee
- Relatives: Henry van Straubenzee (paternal grandfather)
- Family: Straubenzee family

Charles Anthony van Straubenzee (born 1988) is an English businessman and investment executive.

== Ancestry, early life and education ==
Charlie van Straubenzee is the youngest son of Captain Alexander van Straubenzee, formerly of the Royal Green Jackets, and Claire van Straubenzee MBE, née Fenwick. Claire is the eldest daughter of Anthony and Caroline Fenwick DL of Lincolnshire. Charlie is the grandson of Lieutenant-Colonel Henry van Straubenzee DSO OBE. The van Straubenzee family are landed gentry, of Spennithorne, North Yorkshire. Their ancestor Colonel Turner van Straubenzee JP DL bought the estate in 1788.

Charlie’s eldest brother is Thomas van Straubenzee. In 2002 his elder brother, Henry, was killed in a car accident. The funeral was attended by members of the British royal family.

Van Straubenzee attended Ludgrove School, where he became a close friend of Prince Harry, Duke of Sussex, and William, Prince of Wales. He graduated from the University of Newcastle upon Tyne in 2010.

== Career ==
Van Straubenzee worked for Jupiter Asset Management in sales team servicing for stockbrokers, family offices, and multi-managers. He joined the investment company Brown Advisory in August 2011. He is a member of the executive team and currently serves as the Global Head of Institutional & Intermediary Business Development.

== Personal life ==
Van Straubenzee served as best man at the wedding of Prince Harry and Meghan Markle.

Van Straubenzee married Daisy Jenks on 4 August 2018 at the Church of St. Mary the Virgin in Frensham. Prince Harry reportedly served as best man at Van Straubenzee's wedding. The ceremony was also attended by Meghan, Duchess of Sussex, Princess Eugenie of York, and Jack Brooksbank. He is a godfather to Prince Archie of Sussex. The couple has three children, Clover Kitty van Straubenzee (born 26 February 2020), Henry Alexander van Straubenzee (born 10 October 2021), and Elfreda Violet van Straubenzee (born 30 January 2024).
