= Ernest Gardner (politician) =

British politician

Sir Ernest Gardner JP

Member of Parliament for Windsor Wokingham (1901–1918)
- In office 12 July 1901 – 15 November 1922
- Preceded by: Oliver Young
- Succeeded by: Annesley Somerville

Personal details
- Born: 18 May 1846
- Died: 7 August 1925 (aged 79)
- Party: Conservative
- Children: 3
- Parent: Joseph Gardner (father)

Sir Ernest Gardner JP (18 May 1846 – 7 August 1925) was a British politician. He was a Conservative Party Member of Parliament (MP) from 1901 to 1922.

== Early life and career ==
Gardner was born in East London, the son of Joseph Goodwin Gardner and his wife, Elizabeth.

== Political career ==
He was first elected to Parliament on 12 July 1901 in an unopposed by-election in the constituency of Wokingham following the resignation of Oliver Young. He remained the seat's MP until it was abolished for the 1918 general election, when he became the MP for Windsor. He retired from Parliament at the 1922 general election. He lived at 'Spencers' at Maidenhead in Berkshire.

== Personal life & death ==
Gardner had three daughters with his second wife, Amy Inglis, including the cardiologist Dame Frances Gardner.

Parliament of the United Kingdom
Preceded by Oliver Young	Member of Parliament for Wokingham; 1901 – 1918	Constituency abolished
Preceded by James Mason as MP for Windsor (Borough constituency)	Member of Parliament for Windsor; 1918 – 1922	Succeeded by Annesley Somerville
