= 1900 Holborn by-election =

UK Parliamentary by-election

The 1900 Holborn by-election was a Parliamentary by-election held on 23 March 1900. The constituency returned one Member of Parliament (MP) to the House of Commons of the United Kingdom, elected by the first past the post voting system.

The seat had become vacant following the death of the incumbent Conservative MP, Sir Charles Hall on 9 March. Hall had been Member of Parliament for the constituency since an 1892 by-election.

== Candidates ==
The Conservative candidate was James Remnant. He was unanimously selected at a meeting of the Holborn Conservative Association on Thursday 15 March. Remnant had been the Moderate London County Council member for Holborn since 1892, and was chairman of the Theatres Committee of the council.

It was speculated that Sir Edward Clarke might be the Conservative candidate. Clarke had been Member of Parliament for Plymouth from 1880 until 10 February 1900, when he resigned by being appointed Steward of the Manor of Northstead. Following the outbreak of war in South Africa in late 1899, Clarke had found himself in total disagreement with his party over the government's South African policy. In early February 1900 his constituency party at Plymouth formally called upon him to resign his seat, and he resigned the following day. Clarke was President of the Holborn Conservative Association.

It was also speculated that Sir Forrest Fulton, the Common Serjeant of London, might be the Conservative candidate.

The Holborn Liberal and Radical Association unanimously decided on Friday 16 March not to contest the seat.

== Result ==
1900 Holborn by-election
Party	Candidate	Votes	%	±%
Conservative	James Remnant	Unopposed		
Registered electors		10,903		
Conservative hold				
