= Philip Remnant, 4th Baron Remnant =

British peer

The Right Honourable The Lord Remnant
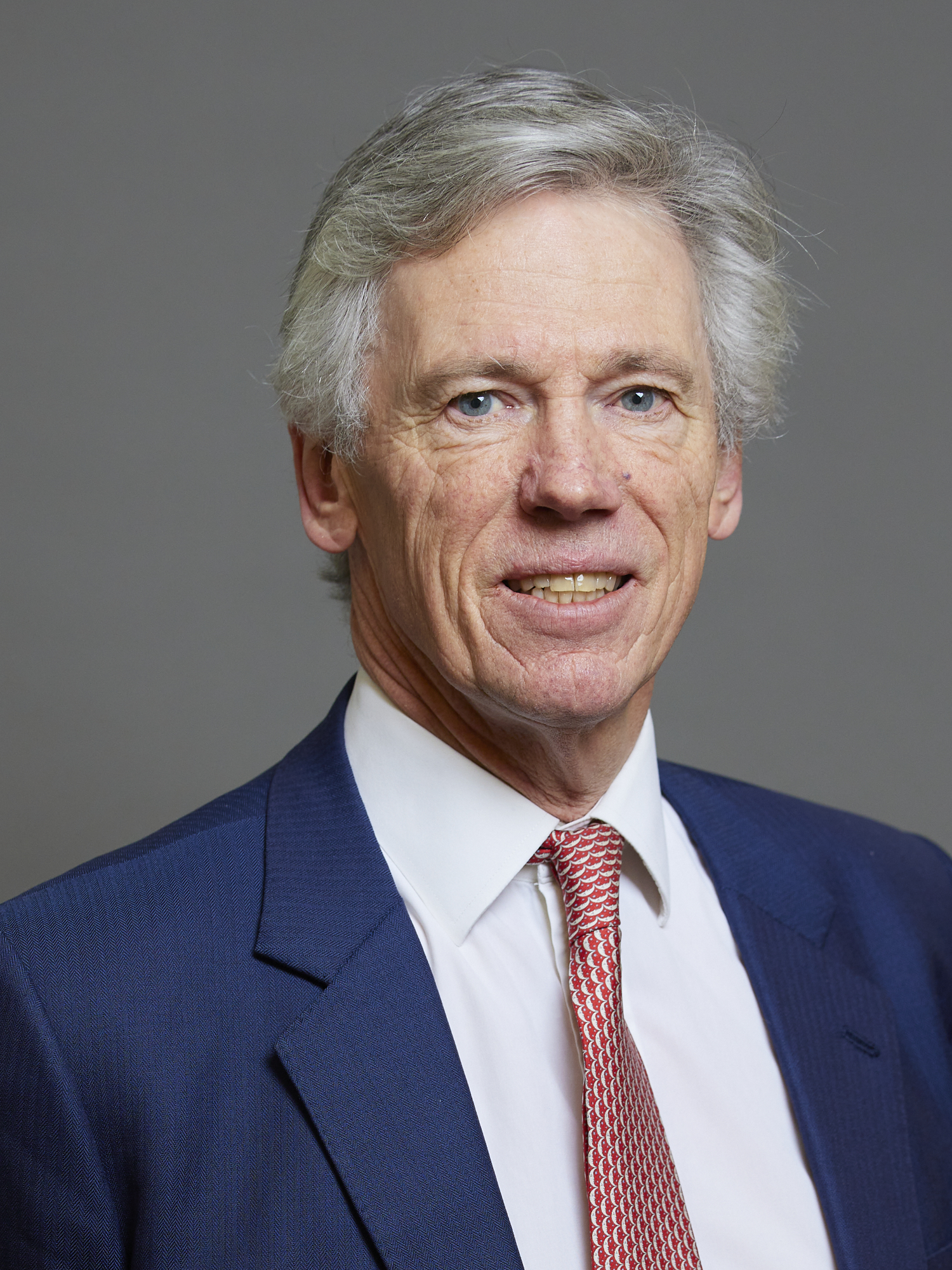
- Official portrait, 2022

Member of the House of Lords
- Lord Temporal
- Elected Hereditary Peer; 11 July 2022 – 29 April 2026
- By-election: 2022
- Preceded by: The 3rd Baron Brabazon of Tara

Personal details
- Born: Philip John Remnant; 20 December 1954 (age 71)
- Party: Conservative
- Parent: James Remnant, 3rd Baron Remnant

Philip John Remnant, 4th Baron Remnant CBE (born 20 December 1954) is a British hereditary peer and Conservative politician. In a July 2022 by-election, he was elected to replace Lord Brabazon of Tara in the House of Lords following Brabazon of Tara's retirement in April 2022. He served as Chairman of Coutts Bank from 2023 to 2025.

He was appointed CBE in the 2011 New Year Honours for services to the financial services industry and to the public sector.

Peerage of the United Kingdom
| Preceded by James Remnant | Baron Remnant; 2022–present | Incumbent; Heir apparent: Hon. Edward James Remnant |
Parliament of the United Kingdom
| Preceded by The Lord Brabazon of Tara | Elected hereditary peer to the House of Lords under the House of Lords Act 1999; 2022–2026 | Position abolished under the House of Lords (Hereditary Peers) Act 2026 |
