= Francis Duncan =

British politician

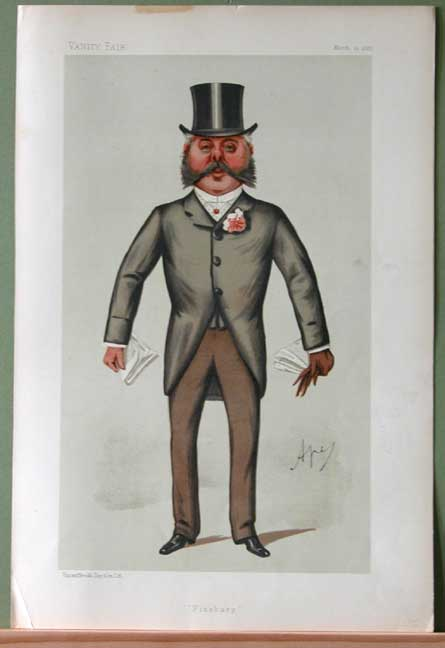
"Finsbury". Caricature by Ape published in Vanity Fair in 1887.

Francis Duncan CB (1836 – 16 November 1888) was a Royal Artillery officer, lawyer, historian and Conservative politician. He sat in the House of Commons from 1885 to 1888.

== Life ==
Duncan was born in Scotland, the son of John Duncan and his wife Helen. He was educated at the University of Aberdeen (honours MA) and entered the Royal Artillery in 1855. He went to Canada, where he was awarded Honorary DCL from King's College in 1861. In 1864 he became a captain and in 1874 a major, receiving an Honorary LLD from the University of Aberdeen in the same year. He was an instructor at the School of Gunnery (Royal Military Academy, Woolwich) from 1877 to 1882, becoming lieutenant-colonel in 1881, and received an Honorary DCL from the University of Durham in 1882.

While at Woolwich, Duncan, together with Surgeon-Major Peter Shepherd, a fellow graduate of Aberdeen, established the concept of teaching first aid skills to civilians. Duncan was a deeply religious man with high humanitarian values, who strongly supported the principle of battlefield ambulance transport.

He was employed with the Egyptian Army from 1883 to 1885 (3rd Class Osmanleh) and became a colonel in 1885. He was author of several works relating to military history.

At the 1885 general election, Duncan was elected as the Member of Parliament (MP) for Holborn. He was re-elected in the 1886 general election, but died in office in 1888. Most of his 59 interventions recorded in Hansard concerned military matters.

Duncan married Mary K. Cogswell from Halifax, Nova Scotia. One of the original Woolwich Free Ferry vessels was named after him.

== Publications ==
- History of the Royal Regiment of Artillery 1872, John Murray (London)
- The English in Spain or the Story of the War of Succession Between 1834 and 1840
- A Description of the Island of St. Helena: Containing Observations on Its Singular Structure

Parliament of the United Kingdom
New constituency	Member of Parliament for Holborn; 1885 – 1888	Succeeded by Gainsford Bruce
