= Charles Hall (Holborn MP) =

British lawyer and politician

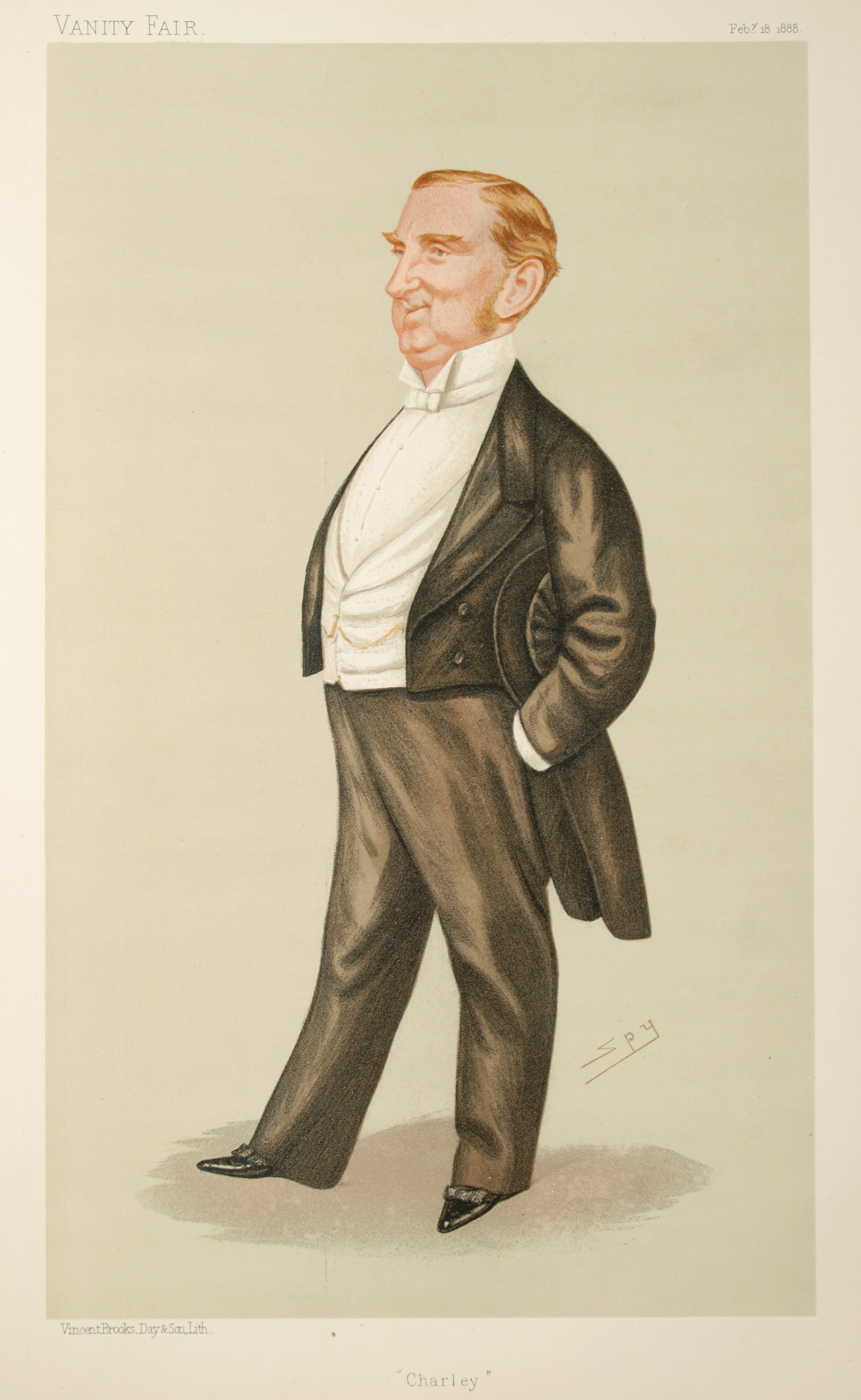
"Charley" as caricatured by Spy (Leslie Ward) in Vanity Fair, February 1888

Sir Charles Hall KCMG PC QC (3 August 1843 – 9 March 1900) was a British lawyer and politician.

He was the second son of Sir Charles Hall (1814–1883) and his wife, Sarah née Duval. After attending Harrow School, he studied at Trinity College, Cambridge, and under James Hannen, Baron Hannen at Lincoln's Inn.

He was called to the bar at Lincoln's Inn on 17 November 1866, and built up a large practice in the Admiralty court and the south-east of England, becoming a Queen's Counsel in 1881. He was made a Bencher of the Middle Temple in 1884.

From 1877 he was attorney-general to the Prince of Wales, and he apparently was a great favourite with the Prince and his wife. In May 1890, he was made a Knight Commander of the Order of St Michael and St George (KCMG) for acting as the British representative at an international conference on maritime law held in Washington, D.C., the previous year.

In the 1885 United Kingdom general election he was returned as Conservative member of parliament for the Chesterton division of Cambridgeshire. After his defeat in the 1892 general election, he was elected at a by-election in August 1892 for the Holborn division of Finsbury. He was not a frequent speaker in Parliament.

In 1892 he was appointed Recorder of London, an office which could be combined with being in Parliament, but not with a court position (thus he resigned as attorney-general to the Prince of Wales). A contemporary newspaper obituary has the following on his time as recorder:

The late Recorder has fully justified his appointment. His sentences have, perhaps, at times been unduly severe, but he has been courteous and patient, and little criticism has been passed on his judicial conduct.

He was appointed as a Privy Councillor in 1899, and died in office on 9 March 1900 aged 56.

He never married, and is buried in Kensal Green Cemetery.

== Sources ==
- Rigg, James McMullen (2004). "Hall, Sir Charles (1843–1900)", revised by Catherine Pease-Watkin, Oxford Dictionary of National Biography, Oxford University Press. Accessed 15 July 2008.

Parliament of the United Kingdom
New constituency	Member of Parliament for Chesterton; 1885 – 1892	Succeeded by Hugh Hoare
Preceded by Gainsford Bruce	Member of Parliament for Holborn; 1892 – 1900	Succeeded by James Remnant
