= Gainsford Bruce =

British politician and judge (1834–1912)

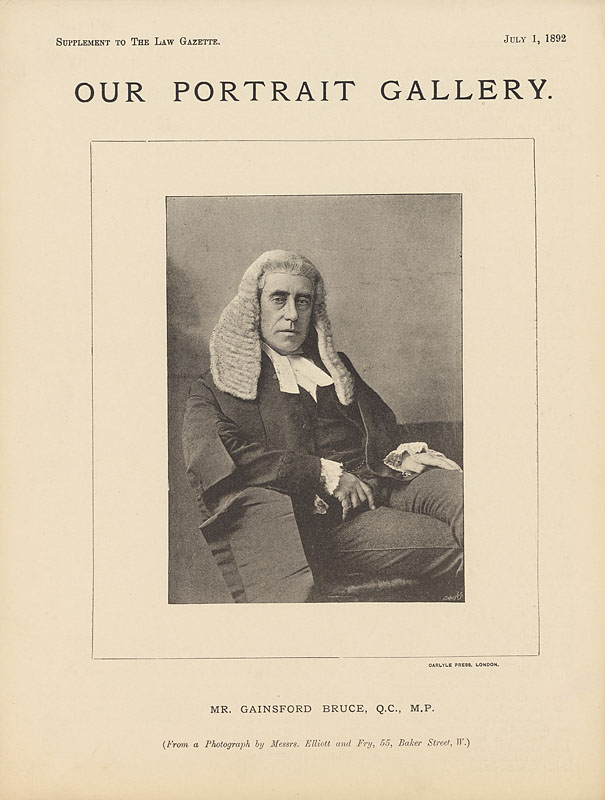
Sir Gainsford Bruce.

Sir Gainsford Bruce (1834 – 24 February 1912) was a British politician and judge.

== Biography ==
Bruce was born in 1835 in Newcastle upon Tyne, the son of the Reverend Dr. Collingwood Bruce, a proprietor of a private school, and his wife Charlotte (née Gainsford). He was educated at Glasgow University, and in 1859 was called to the bar at Middle Temple. In 1883 he was appointed a Queen's Counsel.

Bruce first stood for the Conservative Party at Gateshead in 1880 but was defeated; he failed again in 1883 at Newcastle, 1885 at Tyneside and 1886 at Barrow. He was finally returned to Parliament for Finsbury (Holborn Division) in 1888. In the 1892 election he was again returned for the Holborn division, but before Parliament sat he was appointed a Judge and had to resign his seat. He sat as a Judge until he retired in 1904. He was knighted in 1892 and in 1904 was appointed a Privy Councillor.

He specialised in shipping law. He was co-author with R G Williams of the textbook Admiralty Practice. Bruce died at his home near Bromley, Kent, aged 77.

== Assessment ==
Patrick Polden described Bruce as "one of Halsbury's more questionable appointments".

Legal offices
Preceded by Joseph Kay	Solicitor-General of Durham; 1886–1887	Succeeded by John Forbes
Preceded by John Aspinall	Attorney-General of Durham; 1886–1887	Succeeded by John Forbes
Preceded by James Fleming	Chancellor of Durham; 1887–1892	Succeeded by Thomas Milvain
Parliament of the United Kingdom
Preceded by Francis Duncan	Member of Parliament for Holborn; 1888–1892	Succeeded by Sir Charles Hall
