= Frances Gardner =

Cardiologist and teacher of medicine

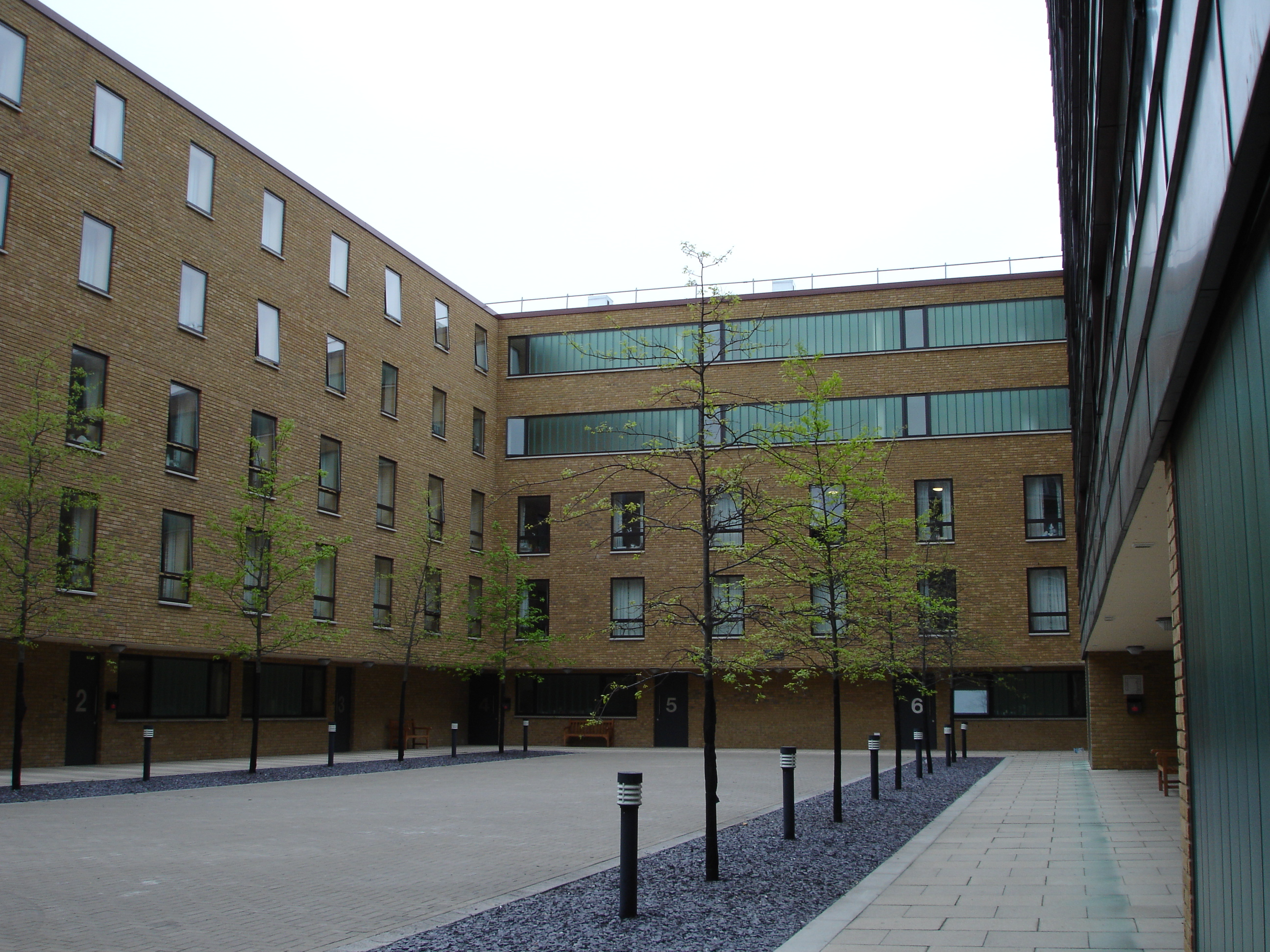
Frances Gardner House, a residence hall at UCL

Dame Frances Violet Gardner (28 February 1913 – 10 July 1989) was an English cardiologist. She introduced angiocardiography to Britain in 1946 and worked at the Royal Free Hospital from 1943 to 1975.

== Early life ==
Frances Gardner was born in Maidenhead in 1913 to Sir Ernest Gardner, a Conservative MP, and Amy Inglis, who was the daughter of politician and soldier John Laurie. She attended Headington School, Oxford, and went on to gain a BSc in mathematics and chemistry from Westfield College in London in 1935. Shen then studied medicine at the London Royal Free Hospital School of Medicine for Women, completing her MBBS in 1940 and an MD in 1943.

== Career ==
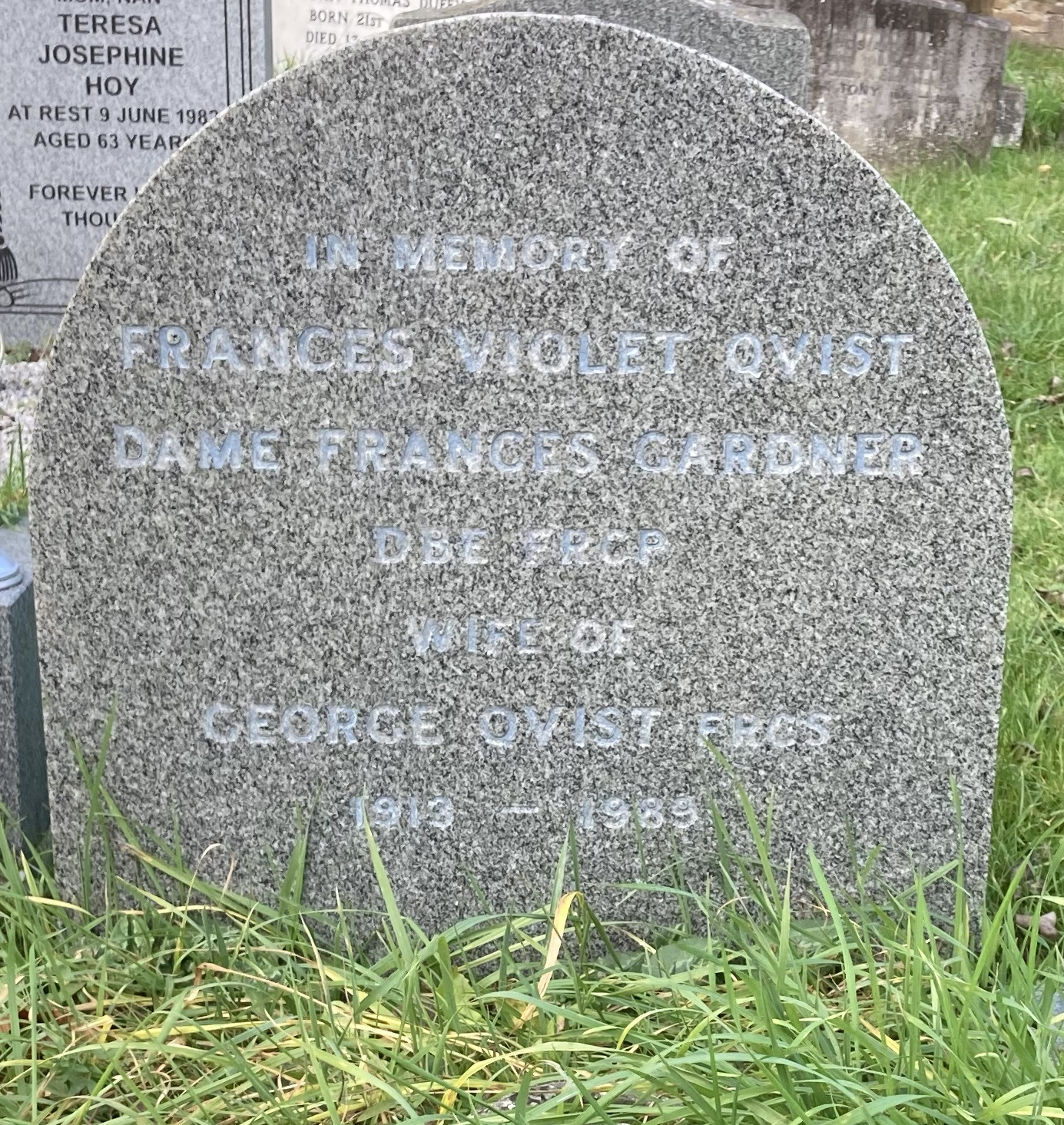
Grave of Dame Frances Gardner in Highgate Cemetery

Gardner spent her entire medical career at London's Royal Free Hospital, from junior posts beginning in 1943. During the Second World War, she arranged the reception of incoming casualties to the hospital, and with the surgeon George Qvist (whom she would go on to marry in 1958), she organised activities to boost the morale of the fellow medical staff. After the war, she received a travelling fellowship that allowed her to visit Harvard Medical School, where she learned to perform angiocardiography, a technique that allows for visualisation of the heart's blood vessels and is used for diagnosing coronary artery disease. She was responsible for introducing the technique to Britain upon her return in 1946. The same year, she was appointed a consultant physician to the Royal Free in general medicine and cardiology. She became dean of the Royal Free Hospital School of Medicine in 1962, a position she held until 1975, and was president of the medical school from 1975 until her death in 1989. She also held consulting positions at the Royal National Throat, Nose and Ear Hospital, the Hospital for Women in Soho, and the Mothers' Hospital in Lower Clapton.

Gardner was elected Fellow of the Royal College of Physicians in 1952 and Fellow of the Royal College of Surgeons in 1983, and appointed Dame Commander of the Order of the British Empire (DBE) in 1975.

== Later life ==
Gardner retired in 1975 and died in Camden, London, in 1989 and was buried on the eastern side of Highgate Cemetery. Her will left the majority of her estate to purchase student accommodation at the Royal Free; a hall of residence at University College London is now named for her.
