= Jeremy Whitaker =

British soldier and photographer (1934–2019)

- Born: 10 November 1934
- Died: September 2019 (aged 84)
- Alma mater: Eton College; Royal Military Academy Sandhurst
- Military career
- Allegiance: United Kingdom
- Branch: British Army
- Commands: Coldstream Guards

Jeremy Ingham Whitaker (10 November 1934 – September 2019) was a soldier turned professional photographer.

== Early life and education ==
Whitaker's parents were Army Officer Major Leith Ingham Tomkins Whitaker and Myrtle Clare Van de Weyer. Whitaker was born near Grayshott, and was given an insight into army life from a young age.

Whitaker attended Eton from 1948 and then went on to join Royal Military Academy Sandhurst when he left in 1953.

== Army career ==
While at Sandhurst, Whitaker applied to join the Rifle Brigade in Winchester, but his "lighthearted personality wasn’t seen as a fit". Following Sandhurst he joined the Coldstream Guards as an officer in 1953. Over 15 years of service, he was stationed in many countries including the Democratic Republic of Congo, Nigeria, Germany and Yemen.

Whitaker began to hone his photography skills in Aden, Yemen, which led him to pursue a career as a photographer. His obituary in The Guardsman Magazine notes that at the end of his deployment in Yemen he "persuaded the Commanding Officer to allow him to take four Land Rovers and drive with three other officers and 20 guardsmen back to England. It was an epic journey of nearly 6000 miles ... Jeremy did decide to pass by Petra where typically, he gave an expert lecture on archaeology".

Following his retirement, he maintained links with the army, becoming President of the Aldershot branch of the Coldstream Guards Association.

== Photography career ==
Whitaker was commissioned to take a Christmas portrait of Queen Elizabeth The Queen Mother as well as interior studies of the Bank of England, Liverpool Cathedral and Buckingham Palace in 2012.

Prints of his architectural photographs are held in the Conway Library at the Courtauld Institute of Art.

Whitaker's photography assistant Douglas Menzies had their work displayed in the National Portrait Gallery's 2009 exhibition 'Portraits of Astronomers'.

== Personal life and death ==
Whitaker had three children - Alexandra, Benjamin and Camilla - with his wife Philippa van Straubenzee.

Lady Diana Spencer spent time working as a nanny at the Whitaker family home, called The Land of Nod, prior to her marriage to Prince Charles.

Whitaker died in September 2019 at the age of 84.
