= Stuart Bevan =

British politician

Stuart James Bevan (31 March 1872 – 25 October 1935) was a British barrister and Conservative politician.

== Education ==
Bevan was educated at St Paul's School and Trinity College, Cambridge, was called to the Bar at Middle Temple in 1895, and took silk in 1919.

== Career ==
Bevan was made a Bencher of his Inn, and in 1932 became Recorder for Bristol. He mainly practised in the Commercial Court.

In 1928 there was a vacancy for the parliamentary constituency of Holborn when the sitting MP, Sir James Remnant, was raised to the peerage. Bevan was chosen as the Conservative candidate to contest the resulting by-election. His candidature was opposed by a section of the local party as he had no links to the area, and they threatened to run an Independent candidate against him. In the event they were unable to find a suitable candidate, and Bevan was elected as Member of Parliament (MP) for Holborn with a majority of 4,127. A general election was called in the following year, and the split of 1928 re-emerged: a large part of the local Conservative organisation supporting the candidature of a local county councillor. Bevan, however, held the seat with an increased majority of 5,563. At the next election in 1931 he increased his vote, with a margin of 13,178 votes over his Labour opponent.

In October 1935 it was announced that Bevan would not be standing for re-election to parliament, and Sir Robert Tasker was chosen to succeed him as Conservative candidate for the constituency. He had become ill, and was unable to complete attendance at a trial. He died in his flat at St James's Place, Westminster on 25 October, aged 63.

Parliament of the United Kingdom
Preceded by Sir James Remnant	Member of Parliament for Holborn; 1928–1935	Succeeded by Sir Robert Tasker
