= William van Straubenzee =

British politician (1924–1999)

Sir William van Straubenzee MBE

Member of Parliament for Wokingham
- In office 8 October 1959 – 18 May 1987
- Preceded by: Peter Remnant
- Succeeded by: John Redwood

Member General Synod of the Church of England
- In office 1975–1985

Personal details
- Born: 27 January 1924 London, England, UK
- Died: 2 November 1999 (aged 75) London, England, UK
- Party: Conservative
- Relations: Straubenzee family
- Education: Westminster School
- Occupation: Army Officer (1943–1949); Solicitor (1952–1999); Politician (1949–1999)

Military service
- Allegiance: United Kingdom
- Branch/service: Royal Artillery
- Rank: Major
- Battles/wars: World War II

Sir William Radcliffe van Straubenzee MBE (27 January 1924 – 2 November 1999) was a British Conservative Party politician.

== Background ==
The family name had come to the United Kingdom when Philip William Casimir van Straubenzee, a Belgian captain in the Dutch Blue Guards, came with Bonnie Prince Charlie to support the Jacobite rising of 1745. As the Jacobite army headed south into England, he met Jane Turner of Kirkleatham. Sir William Turner, who was Lord Mayor of London in 1669, was born in Kirkleatham. In his will, he had bequeathed a substantial amount of money to his great-nephew, Jane's father Cholmley Turner, a member of parliament for Yorkshire, 1727–1741. With marriage blocked by Cholmley Turner, Philip and Jane were forced to elope to marry.

Becoming a member of the British Army, due to his later loyalty to the British Crown, Philip was naturalized as a British citizen by Act of Parliament in 1759 at the request of George II.

== Early life ==
William van Straubenzee was the only son of Brigadier Arthur Bowen van Straubenzee DSO MC (the eighth generation of the family to serve in the military), and his wife, Margaret Joan Radcliffe. He had a sister, Vivien Isabel Ruth van Straubenzee (1934–2016).

Van Straubenzee was educated at Westminster School, where under the influence of his friend Anthony Wedgwood Benn he became a youthful socialist.

== Military career ==
Van Straubenzee's family had a noted military background (eight generations to his father), and Van Straubenzee himself served in his father's regiment, the Royal Artillery (1942–47), including two years in the Far East at staff level. He left the military in 1947 with the rank of Major.

== Professional career ==
Van Straubenzee became a solicitor in 1952, and later a partner in a law firm.

== Political career ==
Van Straubenzee later commented that World War II had "matured" his politics, and he became active in the Conservative Party. Chairman of the London branch of the Young Conservatives from 1949, he became chairman of the Young Conservatives from 1951 until 1953, when he became a governor of the conservative Ashridge think tank. He was awarded an MBE for political services in 1954.

=== Westminster ===
Van Straubenzee unsuccessfully contested Clapham in 1955, after which he was elected to serve as a councillor of Richmond Borough Council 1955–58. He was elected Member of Parliament (MP) for Wokingham from 1959 to 1987, when he retired and was succeeded by John Redwood.

David Eccles appointed him as his Parliamentary Private Secretary from 1960 to 1962. In opposition from 1964, he served as spokesman on labour and social services, and then as an education spokesman where his views were heavily influenced by Sir Edward Boyle.

Van Straubenzee served in Edward Heath's government as junior higher education minister for Education and Science from 1970 to 1972, under Secretary of State Margaret Thatcher. He was promoted to Northern Ireland minister from 1972 to 1974, where he fully engaged the Roman Catholic community and often angered the Ulster Unionist Party. However, after joining Heath's shadow cabinet in March 1974 as shadow Education Secretary, his avowed support of comprehensive school education brought him into conflict with Norman St John Stevas. The political fight was won by Thatcher and Stevas, who replaced him as Educational spokesperson, whilst Van Straubenzee was moved by Heath to become shadow Defence spokesperson.

With his political career blunted, especially after Thatcher replaced Heath as leader in 1975 and sacked him from the shadow cabinet, van Straubenzee focused on his work with the Church of England and backbench efforts. As a "One Nation" conservative and noted "wet" amongst the Conservative party, his complimentary flat in Lollard's tower of Lambeth Palace became the meeting place for the "wet" dissident Conservative grouping, "The Lollards". Van Straubenzee chaired the Conservative backbench Education Committee from 1979 until he stepped down, and was personally recommended for a knighthood by Thatcher in the 1981 Birthday Honours.

In government documents released in July 2015, van Straubenzee was named in connection to child sexual abuse, but the context of the reference is not known.

== Church of England ==
Van Straubenzee was a member of the House of Laity from 1965 to 1970, and was elected to the General Synod of the Church of England in 1975 serving until 1985. He chaired the Synod's Dioceses Commission from 1978 to 1986, and was appointed by Margaret Thatcher to be the Second Church Estates Commissioner in 1979 (dealing with Anglican Church matters in the House of Commons), a post he held until he stood down in 1987.

A progressive within the Anglican and CoE, Van Straubenzee opposed Lord Cranborne's private bill in 1981, designed to allow congregations to continue to use the 1662 Book of Common Prayer, over the recently introduced Alternative Service Book. During the period in which relations between CoE bishops and the Conservative Government declined, he clashed publicly with the chairman of the Conservative party John Selwyn Gummer (then also a member of the General Synod), over Gummer's open criticisms of the episcopal bench.

In 1992 after stepping down from the House of Commons, he chaired a Synod inquiry which recommended that the Prime Minister should lose his right to advise the Queen on senior Church appointments, and that vacancies for bishoprics should be advertised. The recommendation and most of the report was quickly dismissed by senior members of the episcopate.

== Personal life ==
Van Straubenzee never married and had no children.

== Sources ==
- Times Guide to the House of Commons, 1955, 1966 & 1983

Parliament of the United Kingdom
Preceded by Peter Remnant	Member of Parliament for Wokingham; 1959 – 1987	Succeeded by John Redwood
