= Percy Allott =

British socialist and trade unionist

Percy Allott (21 June 1880 – 1963) was a British socialist and trade unionist.

Born in Lincoln, Allott was educated at the local Wesleyan School, then completed an apprenticeship as a printer. He moved to London, where in 1907 he joined the Labour Party, also becoming active in the National Amalgamated Union of Shop Assistants, Warehousemen and Clerks (NAUSAWC). During World War I, Allott ran the YMCA but in Leysdown, in Kent.

After the war, Allott returned to London, and became the organiser for the London Wholesale Textile Branch of NAUSAWC. He also served on the executive of the London Trades Council, and as a delegate to the Trades Union Congress. He proposed a scheme for daily, evening and weekly Labour Party publications, but although it was discussed in the Labour Party press, it was not adopted. In his spare time, he also wrote poetry and some articles for the press.

Allott stood for the Labour Party in the 1928 Holborn by-election, taking 21.0% of the votes cast, and a distant second place.

Allott retired in 1945, but found a new position as a clerk with the Board of Trade, becoming active in the Civil Service Clerical Association. In 1962, he moved to a Quaker home for elderly people, in Polegate. He died less than a year later.
