= Robert Tasker =

British architect and politician

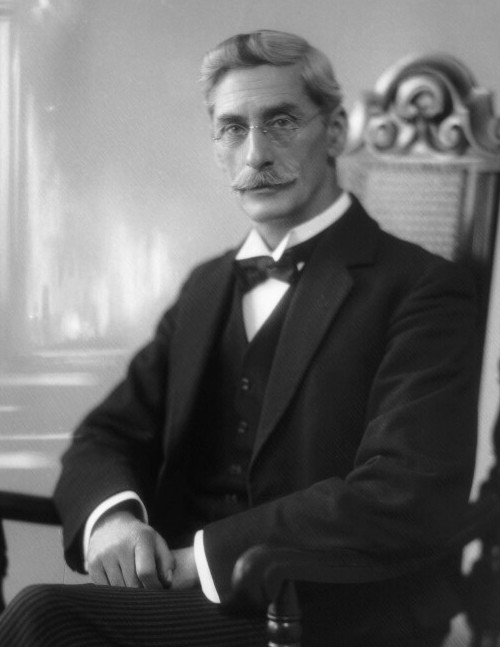
Sir Robert Tasker

Sir Robert Inigo Tasker, TD, DL, JP (20 October 1868 – 28 February 1959) was a British architect and Conservative politician.

== Architecture ==
Robert was the son of George Tasker, and following education at Ardingly College he joined his father's architectural practice in 1892. He became senior partner in the firm in 1916. He was a member of the Institute of Registered Architects and was on the council of the Architects Registration Council of the United Kingdom. He also served as president for the Incorporated Association of Architects and Surveyors from 1928 to 1930.

== Military service ==
Tasker held a commission in the British Army Volunteer and Territorial Forces between 1900 and 1920. He was appointed a second lieutenant in the 21st Middlesex Rifle Volunteers in 1900. In 1908 the unit became the 11th Battalion of the London Regiment (Finsbury Rifles). Following the outbreak of war, he reached the rank of major in 1916.

== Politics ==
He was elected to the London County Council in March 1910, representing Holborn as a member of the majority Municipal Reform Party, which was allied to the parliamentary Conservative Party. He resigned his seat in October 1914 when he entered active military service, returning to the council at the 1922 election. He remained a member of the council until 1937 and served as chairman between 1930 and 1931. He was knighted in 1931 at the end of his term of office. In October 1935 he was granted the freedom of the Metropolitan Borough of Holborn. He was also a member of three livery companies of the City of London: the Paviors, Fan Makers and Gardeners.

Tasker was an unsuccessful Conservative candidate at the 1923 general election, when he failed to be elected at Bethnal Green North East. Another election was held in 1924, and Tasker stood again, this time at Islington East. In a three-cornered contest, Tasker defeated the sitting Liberal Member of Parliament (MP), Arthur Comyns Carr. Five years later he was defeated when a swing to Labour saw Ethel Bentham, one of his opponents in 1924, take the seat.

In 1935 he was selected as Conservative candidate for the Holborn constituency. Duly elected, Tasker was on the right wing of the Conservative Party, and frequently found himself at odds with the wartime National Government.

The life of the parliament elected in 1935 was extended to ten years due to the Second World War. Tasker had been confirmed as parliamentary candidate by Holborn Conservative Association in October 1944. However, in February 1945 Max Aitken was adopted as candidate for the upcoming general election. Tasker described the situation as "quite irregular" as he had had no intention of withdrawing his candidature. However he did not contest the election, effectively retiring from politics.

== Death ==
Sir Robert Tasker died, aged 90, on 28 February 1959. His funeral was held at Hawkinge Crematorium, Folkestone on 6 March.

Parliament of the United Kingdom
Preceded by Arthur Comyns Carr	Member of Parliament for Islington East; 1924–1929	Succeeded by Ethel Bentham
Preceded by Stuart Bevan	Member of Parliament for Holborn; 1935–1945	Succeeded by Sir Max Aitken, 2nd Baronet
Political offices
Preceded by Lord Monk Bretton	Chairman of the London County Council; 1930 – 1931	Succeeded by Ernest Sanger
