= Robert Remnant, 2nd Baron Remnant =

English cricketer (1895–1967)

Personal information
- Full name: Robert John Farquharson Remnant
- Born: 29 March 1895; Westminster, London, England
- Died: 4 June 1967 (aged 72); Hare Hatch, Berkshire, England
- Batting: Right-handed
- Bowling: Right-arm medium-fast
- Relatives: Peter Remnant (brother); Cunliffe Gosling (uncle)

Domestic team information
- Years: Team
- 1931–1936: Minor Counties
- 1920–1936: Berkshire

Career statistics
Competition	First-class
Matches	3
Runs scored	113
Batting average	28.25
100s/50s	–/–
Top score	47
Balls bowled	438
Wickets	5
Bowling average	37.80
5 wickets in innings	–
10 wickets in match	–
Best bowling	3/80
Catches/stumpings	1/–
- Source: Cricinfo, 4 April 2015

Robert John Farquharson Remnant, 2nd Baron Remnant MBE (29 March 1895 – 4 June 1967) was an English cricketer, active from 1920 to 1936. A right-handed batsman and right-arm medium-fast bowler, he made three appearances in first-class cricket but was mostly associated with minor counties cricket.

The son of James Remnant, 1st Baron Remnant, Remnant was born at Westminster, London. He was educated at Eton College and later attended Magdalen College, Oxford. Remnant served with the Royal Berkshire Regiment during the First World War, reaching the rank of major. He made his debut in minor counties cricket for Berkshire following the war in 1920 against Hertfordshire at Watford. He played regularly for Berkshire throughout the 1920s, and in 1931 he was selected to play in first-class match for a combined Minor Counties cricket team against the touring New Zealanders at Gainsborough. He succeeded his father as the 2nd Baron Remnant in 1933. He made two further first-class appearances for the Minor Counties cricket team in 1934 and 1936, playing twice against Oxford University at the University Parks. In his three first-class appearances he scored a total of 113 runs with a high score of 47, while with the ball he took 5 wickets with best figures of 3/80. He continued to play minor counties cricket for Berkshire until 1936, by which point he had made 73 appearances. He was made an MBE in the 1945 honours list.

He died at his home, Bear Place, at Hare Hatch near Wargrave in Berkshire, on 4 June 1967, and was succeeded as the 3rd Baron upon his death by his son, James Wogan Remnant. His brother Peter, and uncle, Cunliffe Gosling, were both first-class cricketers.

Peerage of the United Kingdom
Preceded by James Farquharson Remnant	Baron Remnant; 1933–1967	Succeeded by James Wogan Remnant
