= Oliver Young =

British politician

- Born: 11 July 1855; Wargrave, Berkshire, England
- Died: 9 October 1908 (aged 53); Hare Hatch, Berkshire, England
- Military career
- Allegiance: United Kingdom
- Branch: Royal Navy
- Rank: Commander
- Service number: 1869–1887
- Unit: 69th Navy
- Other work: Member of Parliament

Commander Oliver Young (11 July 1855 – 9 October 1908) was an English Royal Navy officer and later a British politician. He was the Conservative Member of Parliament (MP) for Wokingham from 1898 to 1901.

== Early life and Navy ==
Young was born on 11 July 1855 at Wargrave in Berkshire, the son of Adolphus William Young a solicitor and later a Member of Parliament and his Australian wife Jane (née Throsby). He was educated at Burney's Naval Academy at Gosport and entered the Royal Navy in 1869.

By 1875 Young was promoted to sub-lieutenant and was a lieutenant by 1880. He served on HMS Beacon (1867) during the 1882 Bombardment of Alexandria and he was later on board HMS Condor during the campaign in Sudan. In June 1887 Shaw retired from the Navy and married Mabell Ann Beale in 1888.

== Politics ==
Young was elected to Parliament in a by-election following the death of Sir George Russell in 1898. He left Parliament when he resigned using the procedural device of becoming Steward of the Manor of Northstead on 3 July 1901. He died at his home at Hare Hatch in Berkshire on 9 October 1908.

Parliament of the United Kingdom
Preceded by George Russell	Member of Parliament for Wokingham; 1898 – 1901	Succeeded by Ernest Gardner
