= Daisy Jenks =

English videographer

- Born: Daisy Philippa Jenks; 26 April 1991 (age 34)
- Occupation(s): Videographer, filmmaker
- Spouse: Charlie van Straubenzee (m. 2018)
- Children: 3
- Family: Straubenzee family (by marriage)

Daisy Philippa Jenks (born 1991), also known by her married name Daisy van Straubenzee, is an English filmmaker and videographer.

== Biography ==
Daisy Jenks is the daughter of Philip Richard Jenks and Alexandra Ulrike Wilson "Dixie" Nicol.

She began making films and music videos while she was a student in secondary school. She was hired to film her first wedding in 2010. She started working as a filmmaker and videographer full-time in 2011, working with clients in the United Kingdom and throughout Europe. She is a co-founder, along with her sister Kitty Jenks, of the video business Jenks & Co.

On 4 August 2018 Jenks married Charlie van Straubenzee at the Church of St. Mary the Virgin in Frensham. The wedding was attended by Prince Harry, Duke of Sussex, Meghan, Duchess of Sussex, Princess Eugenie of York, and Jack Brooksbank. The couple have three children, Clover Kitty van Straubenzee (born 26 February 2020), Henry Alexander van Straubenzee (born 10 October 2021) and Elfreda Violet van Straubenzee (born 30 January 2024),
