= Wokingham (constituency) =

Parliamentary constituency in the United Kingdom 1885-1918 and from 1950 onwards

Coordinates: 51.43°N 0.85°W

- County constituency for the House of Commons
- Boundaries since 2024
- Boundary of Wokingham in South East England
- County: Berkshire
- Electorate: 70,235 (2023)
- Major settlements: Wokingham; Winnersh; Twyford

Current constituency
- Created: 1950
- Member of Parliament: Clive Jones (Liberal Democrats)
- Seats: One
- Created from: Newbury; Windsor

1885–1918
- Type of constituency: County constituency
- Created from: Berkshire
- Replaced by: Newbury; Windsor

Wokingham is a constituency in the House of Commons of the UK Parliament, located in the English county of Berkshire. From its creation in 1950 until 2024, it was represented solely by Conservatives, most notably John Redwood, who held his position from 1987 until 2024 when he stepped down following the dissolution of parliament.

Since 4 July 2024, Wokingham has been represented by Clive Jones, a Liberal Democrat.

== Constituency profile ==
The seat covers the prosperous town of Wokingham, the southern suburbs of Reading, and a rural area to the west. Residents are significantly wealthier than the UK average, reflected in high property prices. In 2019 the area was ranked as the least deprived constituency in the UK.

== History ==
Originally, Wokingham was part of a larger constituency of Berkshire, which returned two Members of Parliament (MPs), increased to three in the Reform Act 1832. In the Redistribution of Seats Act 1885 Berkshire was divided into three county constituencies, Northern (Abingdon), Southern (Newbury), and Eastern (Wokingham), and two borough constituencies, Reading and New Windsor, each returning one member. The constituency was abolished under the Representation of the People Act 1918 being largely replaced by the newly created Windsor Division, with the town of Wokingham itself being added to the Newbury Division.

The second version of the seat was created for the 1950 general election. From 1983, its borders have gradually been moved westwards as new constituencies were created in the east of the county.

The constituency was represented from 1987 by the high-profile Conservative John Redwood, having continuously elected Conservative MPs with comfortable majorities throughout its history. However, in 2019, the majority was drastically reduced to 11.9% from 31.5% in 2017 (and 43.2% in 2015) when Redwood was challenged by the Liberal Democrat candidate, Philip Lee, who had been the Conservative MP for the neighbouring constituency of Bracknell.

In December 2023, the Labour Party included the seat in its published list of 211 non-battleground seats, suggesting they did not see it as winnable. On 24 May 2024, two days after announcement of the date of the 2024 UK general election, and just 40 days before the actual date, John Redwood announced he would not be standing again, saying that he had 'other things I wish to do'. The 2024 election result saw Clive Jones of the Liberal Democrats take the seat – the first non-Conservative to do so in the seat's history.

== Boundaries and boundary changes ==
Map of 2010–2024 boundaries

=== 1885–1918 ===
- The Sessional Divisions of Maidenhead and Windsor;
- Part of the Sessional Division of Wokingham; and
- In the Sessional Division of Reading, the parishes of East Swallowfield and West Swallowfield.

=== 1950–1955 ===
- The Borough of Wokingham; and
- The Rural Districts of Easthampstead and Wokingham.

=== 1955–1974 ===
- The Borough of Wokingham;
- The Rural Districts of Easthampstead and Wokingham; and
- The East ward of the County Borough of Reading.

The East ward of Reading was transferred from the abolished constituency of Reading South. From the 1964 general election, the Park ward replaced the East ward following a revision to the local authority wards.

=== 1974–1983 ===
- The Borough of Wokingham;
- The Rural District of Easthampstead; and
- The Rural District of Wokingham parishes of Remenham, Ruscombe, St Nicholas Hurst, Twyford, Wargrave, and Wokingham Without.

The Park ward of the County Borough of Reading was transferred to the re-established constituency of Reading South, along with western parts of the Rural District of Wokingham.

=== 1983–1997 ===
- The District of Wokingham wards of Bulmershe, California, Charvil, Coronation, Emmbrook, Evendons, Hurst, Little Hungerford, Loddon, Norreys, Redhatch, Remenham and Wargrave, St Sebastian's, Sonning, South Lake, Twyford and Ruscombe, Wescott, Whitegates, and Winnersh.

The seat regained north-western parts of Reading South (abolished once again). Eastern areas, comprising the District of Bracknell (formerly the Rural District of Easthampstead) formed the bulk of the new constituency of East Berkshire.

=== 1997–2010 ===
- The District of Wokingham wards of Arborfield, Barkham, Emmbrook, Evendons, Little Hungerford, Norreys, Redhatch, Shinfield, Swallowfield, Wescott, and Winnersh; and
- The District of Newbury wards of Burghfield and Mortimer.

The boundaries moved westwards, gaining parts of Reading East (including Shinfield) and Newbury. The seat lost northern areas to Reading East and the new constituency of Maidenhead, as well as the ward of Wokingham Without in the south to the new constituency of Bracknell.

=== 2010–2024 ===
- The District of Wokingham wards of Arborfield, Barkham, Emmbrook, Evendons, Hawkedon, Hillside, Maiden Erlegh, Norreys, Shinfield North, Shinfield South, Swallowfield, Wescott, and Winnersh; and
- The District of West Berkshire wards of Burghfield, Mortimer, and Sulhamstead.

This change saw a further minor gain from Newbury.

=== 2024–present ===
Under the 2023 periodic review of Westminster constituencies, the constituency was defined as being composed of the following, as they existed on 1 December 2020:

- The Borough of Wokingham wards of: Arborfield; Barkham; Charvil; Emmbrook; Evendons; Finchampstead North; Finchampstead South; Hurst; Norreys; Remenham, Wargrave and Ruscombe; Swallowfield; Twyford; Wescott; Winnersh; Wokingham Without.

The seat underwent major changes, with about half the electorate being transferred out – the parts in the District of West Berkshire to the newly named constituency of Reading West and Mid Berkshire; and western parts of the District of Wokingham, including Earley and Shinfield, to the newly created constituency of Earley and Woodley. To compensate, the boundaries were extended southwards to include the Wokingham Without ward and the community of Finchampstead, transferred from Bracknell; and northwards to include the parts of Wokingham Borough previously in Maidenhead, including Twyford.

Following a local government boundary review in Wokingham which came into effect in May 2024, the constituency now comprises the following from the 2024 general election:

- The Borough of Wokingham wards or part wards of: Barkham & Arborfield; Emmbrook; Evendons; Finchampstead; Norreys; Spencers Wood & Swallowfield (part); Thames (except Sonning parish); Twyford, Ruscombe & Hurst; Wescott; Winnersh; Wokingham Without.

The seat currently comprises a majority of Wokingham district in Berkshire, centred around the town of Wokingham itself. It is in the South East region of England.

The neighbouring constituencies (clockwise from north) are: Wycombe, Maidenhead, Bracknell, North East Hampshire, Reading West and Mid Berkshire, Earley and Woodley, and Henley and Thame.

== Members of Parliament ==
=== MPs 1885–1918 ===
Election	Member	Party	Notes
1885	Sir George Russell, Bt.	Conservative	Died March 1898
1898 by-election	Oliver Young	Conservative	
1901 by-election	Ernest Gardner	Conservative	Contested Windsor following redistribution
1918	Constituency abolished		

=== MPs since 1950 ===
Election	Member	Party	Notes
1950	Peter Remnant	Conservative	
1959	Sir William van Straubenzee	Conservative	
Constituency split, majority renamed East Berkshire, minority merged with part of Reading South
1983	Sir William van Straubenzee	Conservative	
1987	Sir John Redwood	Conservative	Secretary of State for Wales (1993–1995)
2024	Clive Jones	Liberal Democrats	

== Elections ==
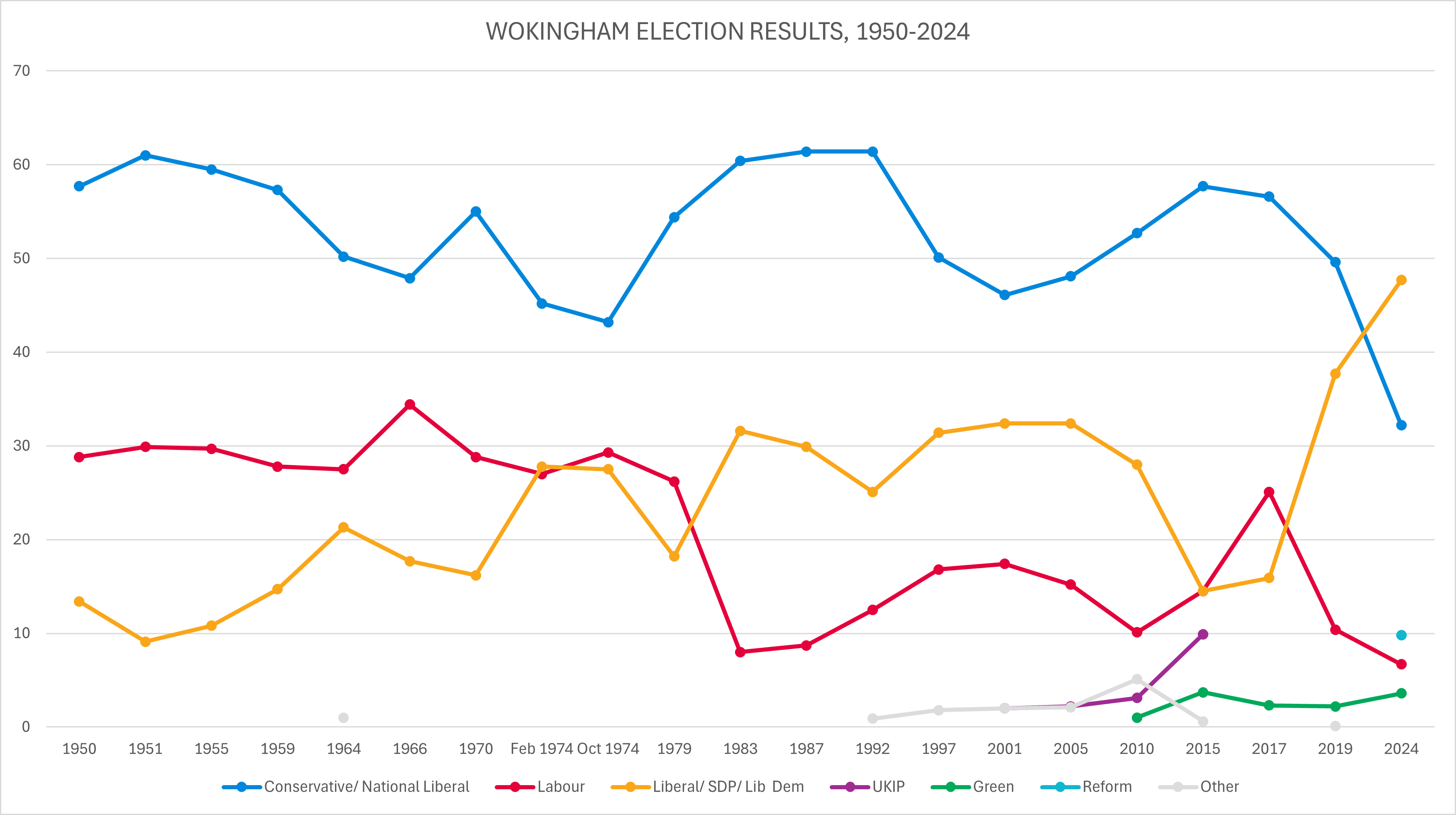
Election results 1950-2024

=== Elections in the 2020s ===
General election 2024: Wokingham
Party	Candidate	Votes	%	±%
Liberal Democrats	Clive Jones	25,743	47.7	▲15.4
Conservative	Lucy Demery	17,398	32.2	▼23.3
Reform	Colin Wright	5,274	9.8	new
Labour	Monica Hamidi	3,631	6.7	▼3.2
Green	Merv Boniface	1,953	3.6	▲1.4
Majority		8,345	15.5	
Turnout		53,999	72.0	▼6.3
Registered electors		75,082		
Liberal Democrats gain from Conservative		Swing	▲19.4	

=== Elections in the 2010s ===
2019 notional result
Party	Vote	%
Conservative	30,524	55.5
Liberal Democrats	17,774	32.3
Labour	5,423	9.9
Green	1,211	2.2
Others	80	0.1
Turnout	55,012	78.3
Electorate	70,235	

General election 2019: Wokingham
Party	Candidate	Votes	%	±%
Conservative	John Redwood	30,734	49.6	−7.0
Liberal Democrats	Phillip Lee	23,351	37.7	+21.8
Labour	Annette Medhurst	6,450	10.4	−14.7
Green	Kizzi Johannessen	1,382	2.2	−0.1
Advance	Annabel Mullin	80	0.1	New
Majority		7,383	11.9	−19.6
Turnout		61,997	73.8	−1.6
Conservative hold		Swing	−14.4	

General election 2017: Wokingham
Party	Candidate	Votes	%	±%
Conservative	John Redwood	33,806	56.6	−1.1
Labour	Andy Croy	15,008	25.1	+10.6
Liberal Democrats	Clive Jones	9,512	15.9	+2.4
Green	Russell Seymour	1,364	2.3	−1.4
Majority		18,798	31.5	−11.7
Turnout		59,690	75.1	+3.2
Conservative hold		Swing	−5.85	

General election 2015: Wokingham
Party	Candidate	Votes	%	±%
Conservative	John Redwood	32,329	57.7	+5.0
Labour	Andy Croy	8,132	14.5	+4.4
Liberal Democrats	Clive Jones	7,572	13.5	−14.5
UKIP	Philip Cunnington	5,516	9.9	+6.8
Green	Adrian Windisch	2,092	3.7	+2.7
Independent	Kaz Lokuciewski	358	0.6	New
Majority		24,197	43.2	+19.5
Turnout		55,999	71.9	+0.4
Conservative hold		Swing	+0.3	

General election 2010: Wokingham
Party	Candidate	Votes	%	±%
Conservative	John Redwood	28,754	52.7	+4.6
Liberal Democrats	Prue Bray	15,262	28.0	−4.7
Labour	George Davidson	5,516	10.1	−4.9
Independent	Mark Ashwell	2,340	4.3	New
UKIP	Ann Zebedee	1,664	3.1	+0.9
Green	Marjory Bisset	567	1.0	New
Monster Raving Loony	Peter "Top Cat Bananaman" Owen	329	0.6	−0.6
Independent	Robin Smith	96	0.2	New
Majority		13,492	24.7	+9.0
Turnout		54,528	71.5	+4.4
Conservative hold		Swing	+4.7	

=== Elections in the 2000s ===
General election 2005: Wokingham
Party	Candidate	Votes	%	±%
Conservative	John Redwood	22,174	48.1	+2.0
Liberal Democrats	Prue Bray	14,934	32.4	0.0
Labour	David Black	6,991	15.2	−2.2
UKIP	Frank Carstairs	994	2.2	+0.2
Monster Raving Loony	Peter "Top Cat Bananaman" Owen	569	1.2	−0.8
BNP	Richard Colborne	376	0.8	New
Telepathic Partnership	Michael Hall	34	0.1	New
Majority		7,240	15.7	+2.0
Turnout		46,072	67.1	+3.0
Conservative hold		Swing	+1.0	

General election 2001: Wokingham
Party	Candidate	Votes	%	±%
Conservative	John Redwood	20,216	46.1	−4.0
Liberal Democrats	Royce Longton	14,222	32.4	+1.0
Labour	Matthew Syed	7,633	17.4	+0.6
UKIP	Franklin Carstairs	897	2.0	New
Monster Raving Loony	Peter "Top Cat Bananaman" Owen	880	2.0	+0.2
Majority		5,994	13.7	−5.0
Turnout		43,848	64.1	−11.0
Conservative hold		Swing	-2.6	

=== Elections in the 1990s ===
General election 1997: Wokingham
Party	Candidate	Votes	%	±%
Conservative	John Redwood	25,086	50.1	−11.7
Liberal Democrats	Royce Longton	15,721	31.4	+5.7
Labour	Patricia Colling	8,424	16.8	+5.5
Monster Raving Loony	Peter "Top Cat Bananaman" Owen	877	1.8	+1.1
Majority		9,365	18.7	−17.6
Turnout		50,108	75.0	−6.8
Conservative hold		Swing	-11.7	

General election 1992: Wokingham
Party	Candidate	Votes	%	±%
Conservative	John Redwood	43,497	61.4	0.0
Liberal Democrats	Paul Simon	17,788	25.1	−4.8
Labour	Nelson Bland	8,846	12.5	+3.8
Monster Raving Loony	Peter "Top Cat Bananaman" Owen	531	0.7	New
Independent	Philip Harriss	148	0.2	New
Majority		25,709	36.3	+4.8
Turnout		70,810	81.8	+3.7
Conservative hold		Swing	+2.4	

=== Elections in the 1980s ===
General election 1987: Wokingham
Party	Candidate	Votes	%	±%
Conservative	John Redwood	39,808	61.4	+1.0
Liberal	John Leston	19,421	29.9	−1.7
Labour	Peter Morgan	5,622	8.7	+0.7
Majority		20,387	31.5	+2.7
Turnout		64,851	78.1	+2.1
Conservative hold		Swing	+0.8	

General election 1983: Wokingham
Party	Candidate	Votes	%	±%
Conservative	William van Straubenzee	32,925	60.4	+2.1
Liberal	John Leston	17,227	31.6	+11.1
Labour	Michael Orton	4,362	8.0	–12.1
Majority		15,698	28.8	–9.1
Turnout		54,514	76.0	
Registered electors		71,725		
Conservative hold		Swing	–4.5	

1979 notional result
Party	Vote	%
Conservative	29,394	58.3
Liberal	10,314	20.5
Labour	10,109	20.1
Others	592	1.2
Turnout	50,409	
Electorate		

=== Elections in the 1970s ===
General election 1979: Wokingham
Party	Candidate	Votes	%	±%
Conservative	William van Straubenzee	36,194	54.44	+11.29
Labour	AE Furley	17,448	26.24	−3.06
Liberal	P Mullarky	12,120	18.23	−9.32
National Front	G Sanders	722	1.09	New
Majority		18,746	28.20	+14.35
Turnout		65,762	78.22	+2.62
Conservative hold		Swing	+7.18	

General election October 1974: Wokingham
Party	Candidate	Votes	%	±%
Conservative	William van Straubenzee	24,009	43.15	−2.01
Labour	RW Crew	16,304	29.30	+2.31
Liberal	T Blyth	15,329	27.55	−0.30
Majority		7,705	13.85	−3.46
Turnout		55,642	75.60	−7.24
Conservative hold		Swing		

General election February 1974: Wokingham
Party	Candidate	Votes	%	±%
Conservative	William van Straubenzee	27,223	45.16	−9.84
Liberal	SMM Cuff	16,791	27.85	+11.67
Labour	RW Crew	16,269	26.99	−1.83
Majority		10,432	17.31	−8.87
Turnout		60,283	82.84	+10.63
Conservative hold		Swing		

General election 1970: Wokingham
Party	Candidate	Votes	%	±%
Conservative	William van Straubenzee	43,183	55.00	+7.11
Labour	Christopher AR Helm	22,630	28.82	−5.59
Liberal	Denis HV Case	12,704	16.18	−1.51
Majority		20,553	26.18	+12.70
Turnout		78,517	72.21	−7.02
Conservative hold		Swing		

=== Elections in the 1960s ===
General election 1966: Wokingham
Party	Candidate	Votes	%	±%
Conservative	William van Straubenzee	34,011	47.89	
Labour	Raymond Carter	24,437	34.41	
Liberal	Margaret Wingfield	12,564	17.69	
Majority		9,574	13.48	
Turnout		71,012	79.23	
Conservative hold		Swing		

General election 1964: Wokingham
Party	Candidate	Votes	%	±%
Conservative	William van Straubenzee	32,777	50.23	−7.30
Labour	John Ellis	17,954	27.52	−0.24
Liberal	Margaret Wingfield	13,875	21.26	
Ind. Conservative	Charles Ford	645	0.99	New
Majority		14,823	22.71	
Turnout		65,251	79.21	
Conservative hold		Swing		

=== Elections in the 1950s ===
General election 1959: Wokingham
Party	Candidate	Votes	%	±%
Conservative	William van Straubenzee	30,896	57.53	−1.99
Labour	Terence Boston	14,905	27.76	−1.94
Liberal	Claud William J Rout	7,899	14.71	+3.93
Majority		15,991	29.77	
Turnout		53,700	79.98	
Conservative hold		Swing		

General election 1955: Wokingham
Party	Candidate	Votes	%	±%
Conservative	Peter Remnant	25,843	59.52	
Labour	Terence Boston	12,895	29.70	−0.18
Liberal	John Patrick McQuade	4,679	10.78	+1.67
Majority		12,948	29.82	
Turnout		43,417	76.63	
Conservative hold		Swing		

General election 1951: Wokingham
Party	Candidate	Votes	%	±%
Conservative	Peter Remnant	21,652	61.01	
Labour	Eric A Hubble	10,606	29.88	
Liberal	John Patrick McQuade	3,233	9.11	
Majority		11,046	31.13	
Turnout		35,491	78.45	
Conservative hold		Swing		

General election 1950: Wokingham
Party	Candidate	Votes	%
Conservative	Peter Remnant	20,612	57.7
Labour	Eric A Hubble	10,296	28.8
Liberal	John Patrick McQuade	4,793	13.4
Majority		10,316	28.9
Turnout		35,701	81.0
Conservative win (new seat)			

== Election results 1885–1918 ==
=== Elections in the 1880s ===
General election 1885: Wokingham
Party	Candidate	Votes	%
Conservative	George Russell	4,710	60.6
Liberal	Edwin Lawrence	3,062	39.4
Majority		1,648	21.2
Turnout		7,772	83.9
Registered electors		9,258	
Conservative win (new seat)			

General election 1886: Wokingham
Party	Candidate	Votes	%	±%
Conservative	George Russell	Unopposed		
Conservative hold				

=== Elections in the 1890s ===
General election 1892: Wokingham
Party	Candidate	Votes	%	±%
Conservative	George Russell	4,986	64.6	N/A
Liberal	Frederick Joseph Patton	2,738	35.4	New
Majority		2,248	29.2	N/A
Turnout		7,724	76.2	N/A
Registered electors		10,142		
Conservative hold		Swing	N/A	

General election 1895: Wokingham
Party	Candidate	Votes	%	±%
Conservative	George Russell	Unopposed		
Conservative hold				

By-election, 30 Mar 1898: Wokingham
Party	Candidate	Votes	%	±%
Conservative	Oliver Young	4,726	56.2	N/A
Liberal	George William Palmer	3,690	43.8	New
Majority		1,036	12.4	N/A
Turnout		8,416	75.2	N/A
Registered electors		11,189		
Conservative hold		Swing	N/A	

- Caused by Russell's death.

=== Elections in the 1900s ===
General election 1900: Wokingham
Party	Candidate	Votes	%	±%
Conservative	Oliver Young	Unopposed		
Conservative hold				

By-election, 1901: Wokingham
Party	Candidate	Votes	%	±%
Conservative	Ernest Gardner	Unopposed		
Conservative hold				

General election 1906: Wokingham
Party	Candidate	Votes	%	±%
Conservative	Ernest Gardner	6,075	56.1	N/A
Liberal	George Gordon	4,750	43.9	New
Majority		1,325	12.2	N/A
Turnout		10,825	83.1	N/A
Registered electors		13,033		
Conservative hold		Swing	N/A	

=== Elections in the 1910s ===
General election January 1910: Wokingham
Party	Candidate	Votes	%	±%
Conservative	Ernest Gardner	8,132	66.5	+10.4
Liberal	Holford Knight	4,095	33.5	−10.4
Majority		4,037	33.0	+20.8
Turnout		12,227	85.3	+2.2
Registered electors		14,327		
Conservative hold		Swing	+10.4	

General election December 1910: Wokingham
Party	Candidate	Votes	%	±%
Conservative	Ernest Gardner	Unopposed		
Conservative hold				

== See also ==
- List of parliamentary constituencies in Berkshire
- List of parliamentary constituencies in the South East England (region)
