= H. W. Bliss =

Indian politician

Sir Henry William Bliss KCIE (1840 – 28 October 1919) was a British civil servant of the Indian civil service who served as a member of the Imperial Legislative Council of India from 1890 to 1892 and Madras Legislative Council from 1893 to 1898.

== Early life and education ==
Bliss was born to Rev. James Bliss in 1840 and was educated at Merton College, Oxford. He qualified for the Madras provincial civil service in 1863.

== Career ==
Bliss served as the Commissioner of Salt and Revenue from 1878 to 1886 and as a member of the Finance Committee of India from 1886 to 1887 and member of the Board of Revenue from 1887 to 1889.

From 1890 to 1892, Bliss served as a member of the Imperial Legislative Council of India and in the Madras Legislative Council from 1893 to 1898. Bliss retired from the Indian civil service in 1898. He died on 28 October 1919 in Abingdon where he lived at the Abbey House.

== Honours ==
Bliss was made a CIE in 1889 and upgraded to a Knight Commander of the Order of the Indian Empire in 1897.
