= 1928 Holborn by-election =

UK Parliamentary by-election

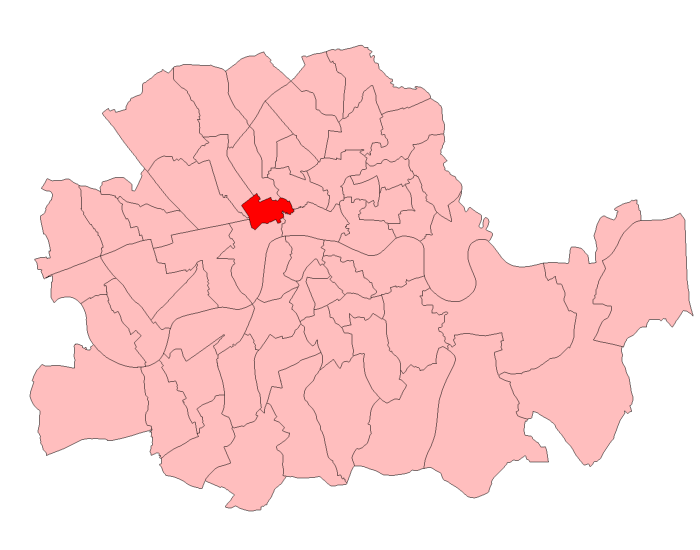
Holborn in 1928

The 1928 Holborn by-election was held on 28 June 1928. The by-election was held due to the elevation to the peerage of the incumbent Conservative MP, James Remnant. It was won by the Conservative candidate Stuart Bevan.

== Candidates ==
Bevan was chosen as the Conservative candidate although his candidature was opposed by a section of the local party as he had no links to the area, and they threatened to run an Independent candidate against him. In the event they were unable to find a suitable candidate, and Bevan was elected as Member of Parliament (MP) For Holborn with a majority of 4,127. A general election was called in the following year, and the split of 1928 re-emerged: a large part of the local Conservative organisation supporting the candidature of a local county councillor. Bevan, however, held the seat with an increased majority of 5,563.

52 year-old local man Thomas Edward Morton stood as the Liberal candidate. He was educated at Harris Academy, Dundee and Glasgow University. During the war he served as a lieutenant in the RAF. He had a commercial career in London and Switzerland.

== Result ==
Holborn by-election, 1928
Party	Candidate	Votes	%	±%
Unionist	Stuart Bevan	6,365	59.7	−15.8
Labour	Percy Allott	2,238	21.0	−3.5
Liberal	Thomas Edward Morton	2,062	19.3	New
Majority		4,127	38.7	−12.3
Turnout		10,665	39.0	−16.1
Unionist hold		Swing	-6.2	

After winning the by-election, Bevan successfully defended the seat at the following year's general election with an increased majority of 5,563 votes. He was again opposed by Morton for the Liberals, who again finished in third place behind a Labour candidate. In 1931, Bevan greatly increased his majority to over 13,000 votes.
