= 1901 Wokingham by-election =

UK Parliamentary by-election

The 1901 Wokingham by-election was held on 12 July 1901 after the resignation of the incumbent Conservative MP Oliver Young. It was retained by the Conservative candidate Ernest Gardner who was unopposed.
