= James Remnant, 3rd Baron Remnant =

British peer (1930–2022)

James Wogan Remnant, 3rd Baron Remnant, CVO (30 October 1930 – 4 March 2022) was a British hereditary peer and banker.

== Biography ==
Remnant was born on 30 October 1930. He was educated at Eton College, before qualifying as a chartered accountant with Touche Ross, where he became a partner from 1958 to 1970. In 1965, he was appointed to the board of the English, Scottish & Australian Bank, serving until that bank's merger into the Australia and New Zealand Banking Group in 1969. Remnant remained on the ANZ board, including service as deputy chairman, until his retirement from the board on 19 January 1981.

He was a member of the House of Lords from 4 June 1967 to 11 November 1999. In September 1989, the Board of the Bank of Scotland appointed Remnant as an ordinary director. Remnant died on 4 March 2022, at the age of 91.

Peerage of the United Kingdom
Preceded by Robert John Farquharson Remnant	Baron Remnant; 1967–2022	Succeeded by Philip John Remnant
