= Holborn (UK Parliament constituency) =

Parliamentary constituency in the United Kingdom, 1885–1950

- Former borough constituency for the House of Commons

1885–1950
- Seats: one
- Created from: Finsbury
- Replaced by: Holborn and St Pancras South

Holborn was a parliamentary constituency centred on the Holborn district of Central London. It returned one Member of Parliament (MP) to the House of Commons of the Parliament of the United Kingdom.

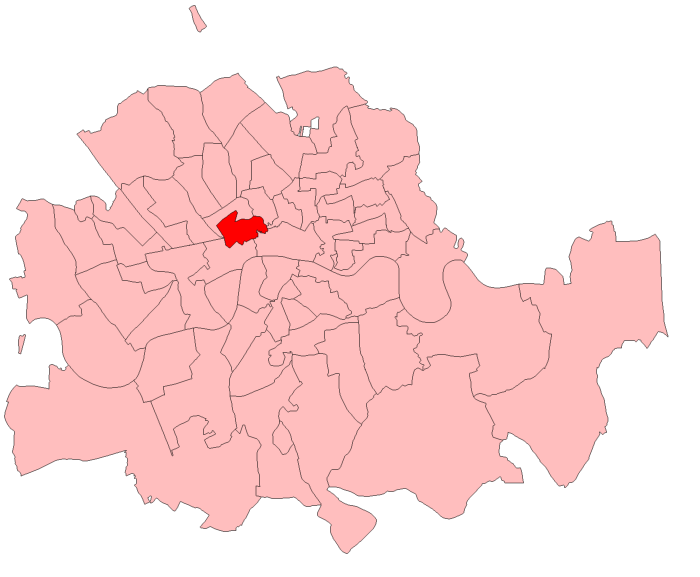
Holborn in the Metropolitan area, boundaries 1885-1918

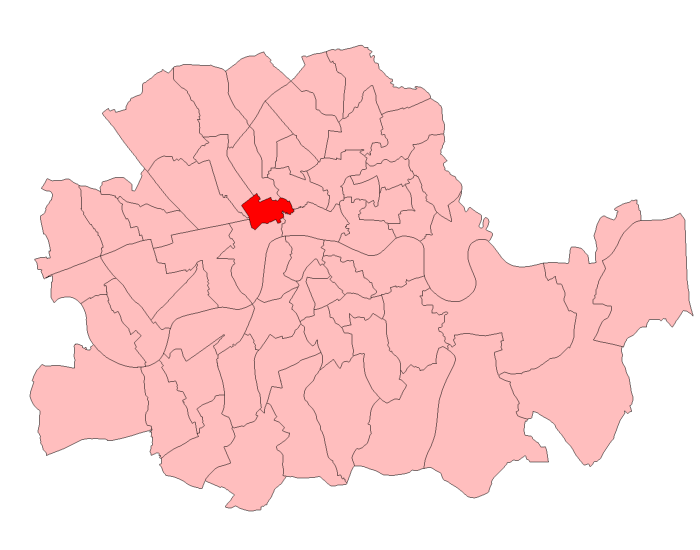
Holborn in the County of London, boundaries 1918-50

The constituency was created for the 1885 general election, and abolished for the 1950 general election, when it was largely replaced by the new constituency of Holborn & St Pancras South.

== Boundaries ==
The Redistribution of Seats Act 1885 provided that the constituency was to consist of-

- so much of the Holborn District as comprises the Parishes of—
  - St Andrew Holborn Above the Bars with St George the Martyr, and
  - Saffron Hill, Hatton Garden, Ely Rents and Ely Place.
- The St Giles District:
  - Gray's Inn,
  - Furnival's Inn,
  - Staple Inn, and
  - Lincoln's Inn.

1918–1950: The Metropolitan Borough of Holborn.

== Members of Parliament ==
Election	Member	Party
1885	Francis Duncan	Conservative
1888	Gainsford Bruce	Conservative
1892	Sir Charles Hall	Conservative
1900	Sir James Remnant	Conservative
1912	Sir James Remnant	Unionist
1928	Stuart Bevan	Unionist
1935	Sir Robert Tasker	Conservative
1945	Max Aitken	Conservative
1950	constituency abolished: see Holborn and St Pancras South	

== Elections ==
=== Elections in the 1880s ===
Charles Harrison

General election 1885: Holborn
Party	Candidate	Votes	%	±%
Conservative	Francis Duncan	4,047	62.1	
Liberal	Charles Harrison	2,473	37.9	
Majority		1,574	24.2	
Turnout		6,520	66.5	
Registered electors		9,802		
Conservative win (new seat)				

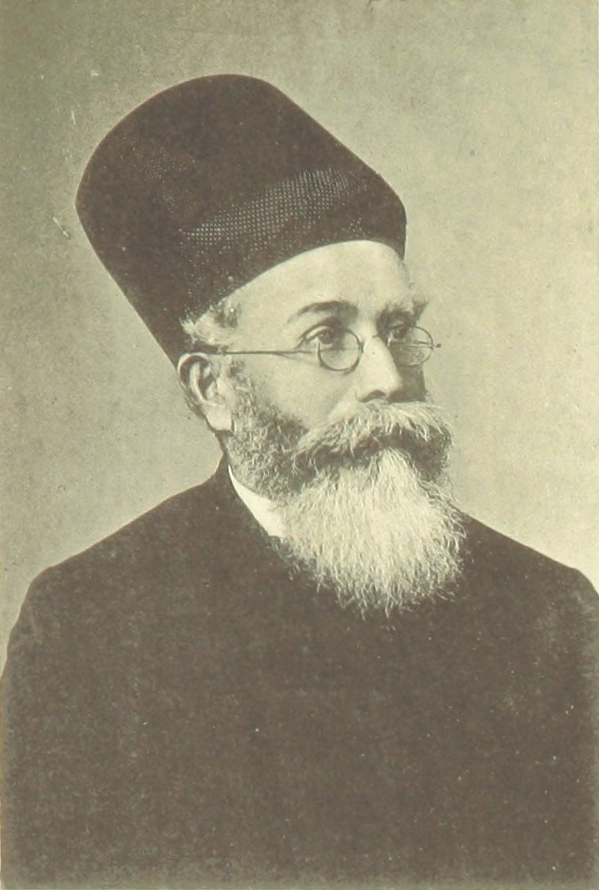
Dadabhai Naoroji

General election 1886: Holborn
Party	Candidate	Votes	%	±%
Conservative	Francis Duncan	3,651	65.2	+3.1
Liberal	Dadabhai Naoroji	1,950	34.8	−3.1
Majority		1,701	30.4	+6.2
Turnout		5,601	57.1	−9.4
Registered electors		9,802		
Conservative hold		Swing	+3.1	

Earl Compton

By-election, 29 Nov 1888: Holborn
Party	Candidate	Votes	%	±%
Conservative	Gainsford Bruce	4,398	56.2	−9.0
Liberal	William Compton	3,433	43.8	+9.0
Majority		965	12.4	−18.0
Turnout		7,831	68.8	+11.7
Registered electors		11,383		
Conservative hold		Swing	-9.0	

=== Elections in the 1890s ===
General election 1892: Holborn
Party	Candidate	Votes	%	±%
Conservative	Gainsford Bruce	4,949	66.6	+1.4
Lib-Lab	George Bateman	2,477	33.4	−1.4
Majority		2,472	33.2	+2.8
Turnout		7,426	60.8	+3.7
Registered electors		12,214		
Conservative hold		Swing	+10.4	

Bruce is appointed a judge on the Queen's Bench of the High Court of Justice, causing a by-election.

1892 Holborn by-election
Party	Candidate	Votes	%	±%
Conservative	Charles Hall	Unopposed		
Conservative hold				

General election 1895: Holborn
Party	Candidate	Votes	%	±%
Conservative	Charles Hall	Unopposed		
Conservative hold				

=== Elections in the 1900s ===
1900 Holborn by-election
Party	Candidate	Votes	%	±%
Conservative	James Remnant	Unopposed		
Conservative hold				

General election 1900: Holborn
Party	Candidate	Votes	%	±%
Conservative	James Remnant	Unopposed		
Conservative hold				

General election 1906: Holborn
Party	Candidate	Votes	%	±%
Conservative	James Remnant	3,881	58.9	N/A
Liberal	Stephen Miall	2,706	41.1	New
Majority		1,175	17.8	N/A
Turnout		6,587	71.3	N/A
Registered electors		9,242		
Conservative hold		Swing	N/A	

=== Elections in the 1910s ===
General election January 1910: Holborn
Party	Candidate	Votes	%	±%
Conservative	James Remnant	4,847	68.2	+9.3
Liberal	Richard Stapley	2,262	31.8	−9.3
Majority		2,585	36.4	+18.6
Turnout		7,109	82.6	+11.3
Conservative hold		Swing	+9.3	

General election December 1910: Holborn
Party	Candidate	Votes	%	±%
Conservative	James Remnant	4,313	72.8	+4.6
Liberal	C. R. Cooke-Taylor	1,615	27.2	−4.6
Majority		2,698	45.6	+9.2
Turnout		5,928	68.9	−13.7
Conservative hold		Swing	+4.6	

General Election 1914–15:

Another General Election was required to take place before the end of 1915. The political parties had been making preparations for an election to take place and by the July 1914, the following candidates had been selected;

- Unionist: Sir James Farquharson Remnant
- Liberal:

General election 1918: Holborn
Party		Candidate	Votes	%	±%
C	Unionist	James Remnant	6,874	86.3	+13.5
	Independent Labour	John Hazelwood Worrall	1,091	13.7	New
Majority			5,783	72.6	+27.0
Turnout			7,965	39.1	−29.8
Registered electors			20,371		
	Unionist hold		Swing	N/A	
C indicates candidate endorsed by the coalition government.

=== Elections in the 1920s ===
General election 1922: Holborn
Party	Candidate	Votes	%	±%
Unionist	James Remnant	8,996	70.5	−15.8
Liberal	John Salter Stooke-Vaughan	3,757	29.5	New
Majority		5,239	41.0	−31.6
Turnout		12,753	47.2	+8.1
Registered electors		26,991		
Unionist hold		Swing	N/A	

General election 1923: Holborn
Party	Candidate	Votes	%	±%
Unionist	James Remnant	7,892	59.4	−11.1
Liberal	John Salter Stooke-Vaughan	3,349	25.2	−4.3
Labour	Augustus West	2,044	15.4	New
Majority		4,543	34.2	−6.8
Turnout		13,285	48.8	+1.6
Registered electors		27,218		
Unionist hold		Swing	−3.4	

General election 1924: Holborn
Party	Candidate	Votes	%	±%
Unionist	James Remnant	11,428	75.5	+16.1
Labour	W.W. Messer	3,718	24.5	+9.1
Majority		7,710	51.0	+16.8
Turnout		15,146	55.1	+6.3
Registered electors		27,490		
Unionist hold		Swing	+3.5	

1928 Holborn by-election
Party	Candidate	Votes	%	±%
Unionist	Stuart Bevan	6,365	59.7	−15.8
Labour	Percy Allott	2,238	21.0	−3.5
Liberal	Thomas Morton	2,062	19.3	New
Majority		4,127	38.7	−12.3
Turnout		10,665	39.0	−16.1
Registered electors		27,357		
Unionist hold		Swing	−6.2	

General election 1929: Holborn
Party	Candidate	Votes	%	±%
Unionist	Stuart Bevan	10,093	56.8	−18.7
Labour	Fitzroy William Hickinbottom	4,530	25.5	+1.0
Liberal	Thomas Morton	3,150	17.7	N/A
Majority		5,563	31.3	−19.7
Turnout		17,773	54.1	−1.0
Registered electors		32,862		
Unionist hold		Swing	−9.9	

=== Elections in the 1930s ===
General election 1931: Holborn
Party	Candidate	Votes	%	±%
Conservative	Stuart Bevan	16,094	84.7	+27.9
Labour	Fitzroy W. Hickinbottom	2,916	15.3	−10.2
Majority		13,178	69.4	+28.1
Turnout		19,010	56.7	+2.6
Conservative hold		Swing	+19.1	

General election 1935: Holborn
Party	Candidate	Votes	%	±%
Conservative	Robert Tasker	11,654	72.9	−11.8
Labour	Richard S. Jeffries	4,325	27.1	+11.8
Majority		7,329	45.8	−23.6
Turnout		15,979	49.0	−7.7
Conservative hold		Swing	-11.8	

=== Elections in the 1940s ===
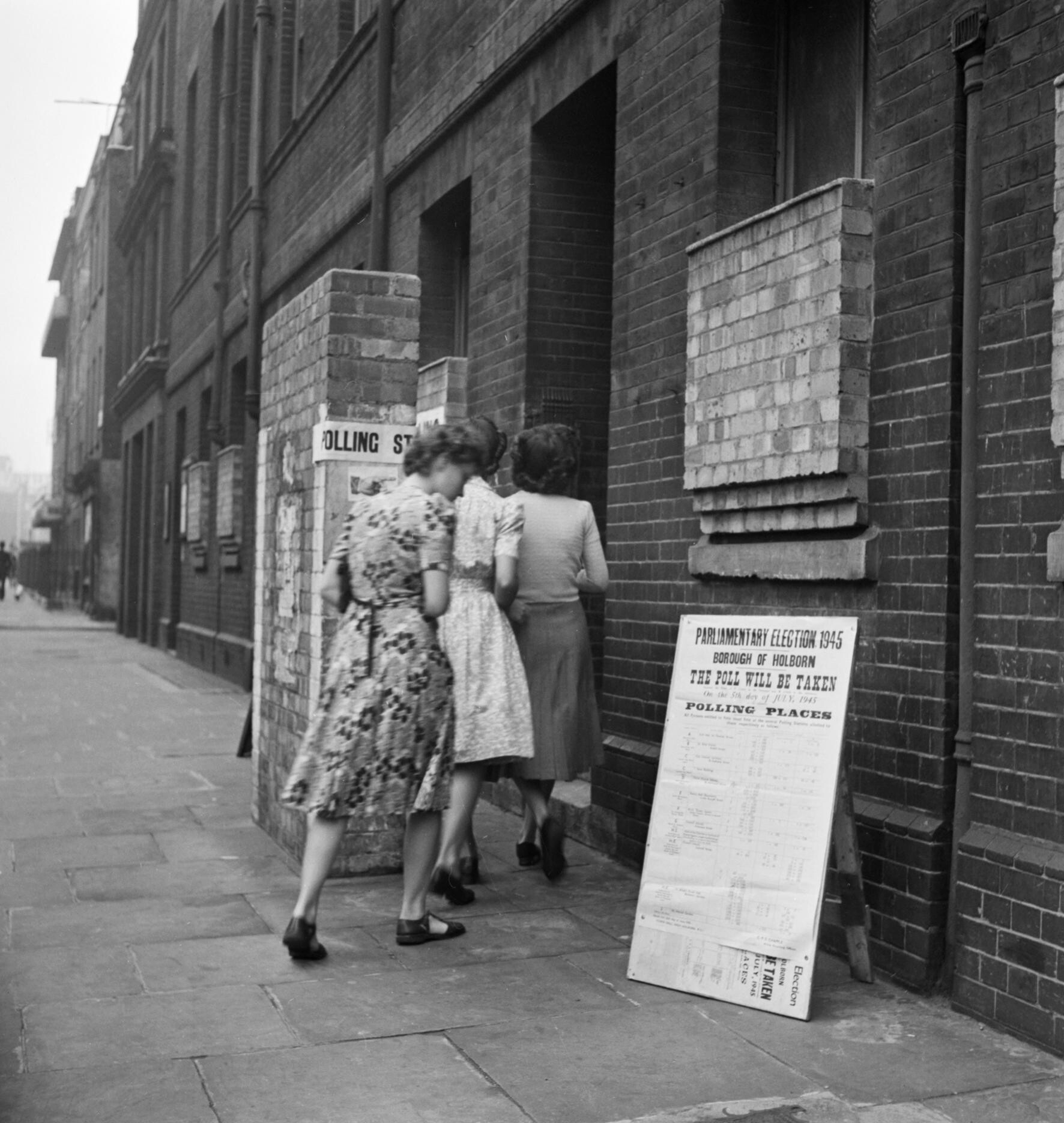
Holborn voters arriving at their polling station to vote in the 1945 General Election.

General election 1945: Holborn
Party	Candidate	Votes	%	±%
Conservative	Max Aitken	6,061	54.1	−18.8
Labour	Irene Marcousé	5,136	45.9	+18.8
Majority		925	8.2	−37.6
Turnout		11,197	68.3	+19.3
Conservative hold		Swing	-18.8	

== New constituency ==
Ahead of the 1950 General Election, Holborn was reconstituted as Holborn and St Pancras South. This was brought about by joining the Metropolitan Borough of Holborn with part of the Metropolitan Borough of St Pancras: wards Five and Seven of the St Pancras South West constituency, and wards Six and Eight of St Pancras South East.
