= 1898 Wokingham by-election =

UK Parliamentary by-election

The 1898 Wokingham by-election was held on 30 March 1898 after the death of the incumbent Conservative MP, Sir George Russell. It was retained by the Conservative candidate Oliver Young.

Wokingham by-election, 1898 Electorate
Party	Candidate	Votes	%	±%
Conservative	Oliver Young	4,726	56.1	N/A
Liberal	G W Palmer	3,690	43.9	New
Majority		1,036	12.2	N/A
Turnout		8,416	75.2	N/A
Conservative hold		Swing	N/A	
