= Henry van Straubenzee =

English cricketer

Personal information
- Full name: Henry Hamilton van Straubenzee
- Born: 7 March 1914; Johannesburg, South Africa
- Died: 12 April 2002 (aged 88)
- Batting: Right-handed
- Bowling: Slow left-arm orthodox
- Role: Bowler

Domestic team information
- Years: Team
- 1938–1939: Essex

Career statistics
Competition	First-class
Matches	4
Runs scored	56
Batting average	28.00
100s/50s	0/0
Top score	38
Balls bowled	636
Wickets	10
Bowling average	18.50
5 wickets in innings	0
10 wickets in match	0
Best bowling	4/96
Catches/stumpings	0/0
- Source: Cricinfo, 19 July 2013

Henry van Straubenzee OBE DSO (7 March 1914 – 12 April 2002) was a British army officer who was awarded the Distinguished Service Order for leadership whilst commanding 12 Royal Tank Regiment, in Northern Italy, in 1944, during the Second World War. He later commanded the 2nd Battalion, The Oxfordshire and Buckinghamshire Light Infantry (the 52nd). He was also an English cricketer, playing for Sandhurst and the Army up to the outbreak of war. He played for Essex between 1938 and 1939.

== Early life and education ==
Henry Hamilton van Straubenzee was born in Johannesburg, South Africa, second son of engineer Henry Turner van Straubenzee (1878–1914) and Elfreda Mowbray van Straubenzee née Rogers (d. 1963), daughter of William Houston Rogers, of Johannesburg. The van Straubenzee family were landed gentry, of Spennithorne, North Yorkshire. Henry would become head of the family after the death of his elder brother Philip Turner van Straubenzee (1912–2005), who had no sons. He was educated at Aysgarth School, Winchester College and at the Royal Military College, Sandhurst. Van Straubenzee was commissioned into the Oxfordshire and Buckinghamshire Light Infantry in August 1934.

== Military career ==
During the Second World War he served in France with HQ 4th Infantry Division (United Kingdom) in 1939-40 and took part in Operation Dynamo. Whilst serving with the British Expeditionary Force he briefly commanded a platoon of Northumberland Fusiliers and was mentioned in despatches. He later served in the Middle East where he was mentioned in despatches in 1943. Van Straubenzee was awarded the Distinguished Service Order for leadership whilst commanding 12 Royal Tank Regiment in Italy during 1944-45. Van Straubenzee's regiment was deployed to support 1 Canadian Corps attack on the Gothic Line in the autumn of 1944: the Gothic line was the last major line of German defence in the Italian Campaign during the last part of the Second World War. The Allies were met by strong opposition from the 1st German Parachute Division and the 4th Parachute Division (Germany). During the battle Van Straubenzee organised the 1st Canadian Infantry Division's crossing of the River Arzilla and the capture of the vital position of Monte Luro whilst under fierce enemy fire.

Following wartime service Van Straubenzee commanded the 2nd Battalion, The Oxfordshire and Buckinghamshire Light Infantry (the 52nd) in Palestine during the Jewish insurgency in Mandatory Palestine. He took over command of the battalion at Bethlehem. He was then posted to HQ 6th Airborne Division at Bir Salim. Van Straubenzee was appointed OBE for his service in Palestine. He was an instructor at the Staff College, Camberley, from 1948 to 1950. He then served with the 11th Armoured Division in West Germany from 1950 to 1953. He was military assistant to two successive Chiefs of the Imperial General Staff at the War Office from 1953 to 1956: Field Marshal Sir John Harding and Field Marshal Sir Gerald Templer. He commanded the 4/7 Royal Dragoon Guards in West Germany in 1956-57. Van Straubenzee was invalided out of the army in 1957 as a result of wartime wounds.

== Later life ==
He joined WH Smith in 1957 and was Managing Director from 1968 to 1974. He was also a noted authority on fly fishing.

Van Straubenzee was awarded the DSO in 1945 and appointed OBE in 1949. In 1943 he married Angela de Laune, daughter of Captain Charles Harry Fenwick of the 60th Rifles; they had three sons and a daughter. Van Straubenzee died on 12 April 2002. His grandson, Thomas van Straubenzee, an intimate friend of the British royal family and godfather to Princess Charlotte, married (and was divorced from) Lady Melissa Percy, daughter of the 12th Duke of Northumberland.

== Sources ==
Obituary The Daily Telegraph 17 April 2002. The Oxfordshire and Buckinghamshire Light Infantry (The 43rd/52nd Regiment of Foot) Philip Booth (1971).
