= James Remnant, 1st Baron Remnant =

British politician

1922 by Bassano Ltd

James Farquharson Remnant, 1st Baron Remnant, CBE (13 February 1862 – 30 January 1933), known as Sir James Remnant, 1st Baronet, from 1917 to 1928, was a British Conservative politician.

== Biography ==
Remnant was the son of Frederick William Remnant of Southwold, Suffolk. He was educated at Harrow School and at Magdalen College, Oxford (1880–83), and was called to the Bar at Lincoln's Inn in 1886. From 1892 to 1901 he represented Holborn in the London County Council as a Moderate, and was chairman of the Theatres Committee of the council.

He was elected unopposed to the House of Commons at a by-election in March 1900 as the member of parliament (MP) for Holborn, a seat he held until 1928. He never held ministerial office but was a member of the Select Committee on Taxation of Land Value (Scotland) in 1904, of the Royal Commission on Canals and Inland Navigation from 1906 to 1910, of the Select Committee on Police Day of Rest from 1908 to 1909, of the Home Office Committee on Conditions and Pay of Police in 1919 and of the Rating Machinery Committee in 1924. Remnant was created a Baronet, of Wenhaston in the County of Suffolk, in July 1917 and following his retirement from the House of Commons, in the 1928 Birthday Honours he was raised to the peerage as Baron Remnant, of Wenhaston in the County of Suffolk.

Remnant married in 1892 Frances Emily Gosling, daughter of Robert Gosling. He died in January 1933, aged 70, and was succeeded in his titles by his eldest son Robert. Lady Remnant died in 1944.

== Notes ==
Parliament of the United Kingdom
Preceded by Sir Charles Hall	Member of Parliament for Holborn; 1900 – 1928	Succeeded by Stuart James Bevan
Peerage of the United Kingdom
New creation	Baron Remnant; 1928–1933	Succeeded by Robert Remnant
Baronetage of the United Kingdom
New creation	Baronet (of Wenhaston); 1917–1933	Succeeded by Robert Remnant
