= Parliamentary constituencies in Berkshire =

The county of Berkshire in relation to England

The ceremonial county of Berkshire (which is entirely made up of unitary authorities – Bracknell Forest, Reading, Slough, West Berkshire, Windsor and Maidenhead and Wokingham) is divided into nine parliamentary constituencies: three borough constituencies and six county constituencies.

== Constituencies from 2024 ==
Conservative † Labour ‡ Liberal Democrat ¤

| Constituency | Electorate | Majority | Member of Parliament | Nearest opposition | Map |
|---|---|---|---|---|---|
| Bracknell CC | 71,660 | 784 | Peter Swallow ‡ | James Sunderland † | Location of the Bracknell constituency in Berkshire after the 2023 boundary review |
| Earley and Woodley BC | 73,548 | 848 | Yuan Yang ‡ | Pauline Jorgensen † | Location of the Earley and Woodley constituency in Berkshire after the 2023 boundary review |
| Maidenhead CC | 75,687 | 2,963 | Joshua Reynolds ¤ | Tania Mathias † | Location of the Maidenhead constituency in Berkshire after the 2023 boundary review |
| Newbury CC | 71,982 | 2,377 | Lee Dillon ¤ | Laura Farris † | Location of the Newbury constituency in Berkshire after the 2023 boundary review |
| Reading Central BC | 73,600 | 12,637 | Matt Rodda ‡ | Raj Singh † | Location of the Reading Central constituency in Berkshire after the 2023 boundary review |
| Reading West and Mid Berkshire CC | 68,781 | 1,361 | Olivia Bailey ‡ | Ross Mackinnon † | Location of the Reading West and Mid Berkshire constituency in Berkshire after the 2023 boundary review |
| Slough BC | 81,295 | 3,647 | Tan Dhesi ‡ | Azhar Chohan (Independent Network) | Location of the Slough constituency in Berkshire after the 2023 boundary review |
| Windsor CC | 73,334 | 6,457 | Jack Rankin † | Pavitar Mann ‡ | Location of the Windsor constituency in Berkshire after the 2023 boundary review |
| Wokingham CC | 75,082 | 8,345 | Clive Jones ¤ | Lucy Demery † | Location of the Wokingham constituency in Berkshire after the 2023 boundary review |

== 2024 boundary changes ==
See 2023 Periodic Review of Westminster constituencies for further details.

| Former name | Current name |
|---|---|
| 1. Bracknell CC; 2. Maidenhead CC; 3. Newbury CC; 4. Reading East BC; 5. Reading West CC; 6. Slough BC; 7. Windsor CC; 8. Wokingham CC | 1. Bracknell CC; 2. Earley and Woodley BC; 3. Maidenhead CC; 4. Newbury CC; 5. Reading Central BC; 6. Reading West and Mid Berkshire CC; 7. Slough BC; 8. Windsor CC; 9. Wokingham CC |
| Boundaries 2010–2024 | Boundaries 2024–present |

For the 2023 Periodic Review of Westminster constituencies, which redrew the constituency map ahead of the 2024 United Kingdom general election, the Boundary Commission for England opted to combine Berkshire with Hampshire and Surrey as a sub-region of the South East Region. As a result, Windsor now includes Englefield Green and Virginia Water in the Surrey borough of Runnymede. The two Reading constituencies (East and West) would be abolished and revert to a single constituency (Reading Central), with two new constituencies created, named Earley and Woodley, and Reading West and Mid Berkshire.

The following constituencies were proposed:

Containing electoral wards from Bracknell Forest

- Bracknell
- Maidenhead (part)

Containing electoral wards from Reading

- Earley and Woodley (part)
- Reading West and Mid Berkshire (part)
- Reading Central

Containing electoral wards from Slough

- Slough
- Windsor (part)^{1}

Containing electoral wards from West Berkshire

- Reading West and Mid Berkshire (part)
- Newbury

Containing electoral wards from Windsor and Maidenhead

- Maidenhead (part)
- Windsor (part)^{1}

Containing electoral wards from Wokingham

- Earley and Woodley (part)
- Wokingham

^{1}also includes part of the Surrey borough of Runnymede

== Results history ==
Primary data source: House of Commons research briefing – General election results from 1918 to 2019

=== 2024 ===
The number of votes cast for each political party who fielded candidates in constituencies comprising Berkshire in the 2024 general election were as follows:

| Party | Votes | % | Change from 2019 | Seats | Change from 2019 |
|---|---|---|---|---|---|
| Conservative | 132,771 | 31.4% | ▼18.7% | 1 | ▼5 |
| Labour | 108,614 | 25.7% | ▼0.4% | 5 | ▲3 |
| Liberal Democrats | 98,858 | 23.3% | ▲3.6% | 3 | ▲3 |
| Reform | 36,252 | 8.6% | ▲8.1% | 0 | 0 |
| Greens | 25,994 | 6.1% | ▲3.0 | 0 | 0 |
| Others | 20,886 | 4.9% | ▲4.5% | 0 | 0 |
| Total | 423,375 | 100.0 | | 9 | |

=== 2019 ===
The number of votes cast for each political party who fielded candidates in constituencies comprising Berkshire in the 2019 general election were as follows:

| Party | Votes | % | Change from 2017 | Seats | Change from 2017 |
|---|---|---|---|---|---|
| Conservative | 222,532 | 50.1% | ▼3.8% | 6 | 0 |
| Labour | 115,747 | 26.1% | ▼6.7% | 2 | 0 |
| Liberal Democrats | 87,532 | 19.7% | ▲9.4% | 0 | 0 |
| Greens | 13,796 | 3.1% | ▲1.5% | 0 | 0 |
| Brexit | 2,284 | 0.5% | new | 0 | 0 |
| Others | 2,044 | 0.5% | ▼0.9% | 0 | 0 |
| Total | 443,935 | 100.0 | | 8 | |

=== Percentage votes ===
Note that before 1983 Berkshire additionally covered the southern part of what is now Oxfordshire, and the Eton and Slough areas which now form part of Berkshire were part of Buckinghamshire.

| Election year | 1922 | 1923 | 1924 | 1929 | 1945 | 1950 | 1951 | 1955 | 1959 | 1964 | 1966 | 1970 | 1974 (F) | 1974 (O) | 1979 | 1983 | 1987 | 1992 | 1997 | 2001 | 2005 | 2010 | 2015 | 2017 | 2019 | 2024 |
|---|---|---|---|---|---|---|---|---|---|---|---|---|---|---|---|---|---|---|---|---|---|---|---|---|---|---|
| Conservative | 54.2 | 48.2 | 60.4 | 48.6 | 47.0 | 50.0 | 56.2 | 58.5 | 59.7 | 47.7 | 46.5 | 53.6 | 44.4 | 44.2 | 54.3 | 54.7 | 57.2 | 55.3 | 42.2 | 40.2 | 43.5 | 50.6 | 54.3 | 53.9 | 50.1 | 31.4 |
| Labour | 13.8 | 16.2 | 22.9 | 22.4 | 37.9 | 38.1 | 42.3 | 39.4 | 37.1 | 33.5 | 39.1 | 33.3 | 26.0 | 28.3 | 23.5 | 16.0 | 16.5 | 19.8 | 28.5 | 30.7 | 24.0 | 18.0 | 21.9 | 32.8 | 26.1 | 25.7 |
| Liberal Democrat^{1} | 32.1 | 35.6 | 16.7 | 28.9 | 13.8 | 11.7 | 1.4 | 2.1 | 3.3 | 18.5 | 14.4 | 12.8 | 29.2 | 27.3 | 21.2 | 28.1 | 25.2 | 23.5 | 24.6 | 26.0 | 27.4 | 25.2 | 8.9 | 10.3 | 19.7 | 23.3 |
| Reform^{2} | – | – | – | – | – | – | – | – | – | – | – | – | – | – | – | – | – | – | – | – | – | – | – | – | 0.5 | 8.6 |
| Green Party | – | – | – | – | – | – | – | – | – | – | – | – | – | – | – | – | * | * | * | * | * | 1.3 | 3.9 | 1.6 | 3.1 | 6.1 |
| UKIP | – | – | – | – | – | – | – | – | – | – | – | – | – | – | – | – | – | – | * | * | * | 3.0 | 10.6 | 0.8 | * | * |
| Other | – | – | – | – | 1.3 | 0.2 | – | – | – | 0.2 | – | 0.3 | 0.3 | 0.2 | 1.0 | 1.2 | 1.1 | 1.4 | 4.7 | 3.1 | 5.0 | 2.0 | 0.4 | 0.6 | 0.5 | 4.9 |

^{1}pre-1979: Liberal Party; 1983 & 1987 – SDP-Liberal Alliance

^{1}As the Brexit Party in 2019

* Included in Other

Accurate vote percentages for the 1918, 1931 and 1935 elections are unavailable because some candidates were elected unopposed.

=== Seats ===
| Election year | 1983 | 1987 | 1992 | 1997 | 2001 | 2005 | 2010 | 2015 | 2017 | 2019 | 2024 |
|---|---|---|---|---|---|---|---|---|---|---|---|
| Conservative | 7 | 7 | 7 | 4 | 4 | 6 | 7 | 7 | 6 | 6 | 1 |
| Labour | 0 | 0 | 0 | 3 | 3 | 2 | 1 | 1 | 2 | 2 | 5 |
| Liberal Democrat1 | 0 | 0 | 0 | 1 | 1 | 0 | 0 | 0 | 0 | 0 | 3 |
| Total | 7 | 7 | 7 | 8 | 8 | 8 | 8 | 8 | 8 | 8 | 9 |

^{1}1983 & 1987 – SDP-Liberal Alliance

=== Maps ===
==== 1885–1910 ====
1885

1886

1892

1895

1900

1906

Jan 1910

Dec 1910

==== 1918–1945 ====
1918

1922

1923

1924

1929

1931

1935

1945

==== 1950–1979 ====
1950

1951

1955

1959

1964

1966

1970

Feb 1974

Oct 1974

1979

==== 1983–present ====
1983

1987

1992

1997

2001

2005

2010

2015

2017

2019

2024

== Historical representation by party ==
=== 1885 to 1918 ===
Conservative Liberal

| Constituency | 1885 | 1886 | 90 | 1892 | 1895 | 98 | 1900 | 01 | 04 | 1906 | Jan 1910 | Dec 1910 | 13 | 16 |
|---|---|---|---|---|---|---|---|---|---|---|---|---|---|---|
| Abingdon | Wroughton | | | | A. K. Loyd | | | | | Strauss | Henderson | | | A. K. Loyd |
| Newbury | W. G. Mount | | | | | | W. A. Mount | | | Mackarness | W. A. Mount | | | |
| Reading | Murdoch | | | Palmer | Murdoch | Palmer | | | Isaacs | | | | Wilson | |
| Windsor | Richardson-Gardner | | Barry | | | | | | | Mason | | | | |
| Wokingham | Russell | | | | | Young | | Gardner | | | | | | |

=== 1918 to 1950 ===
Conservative Labour Liberal

| Constituency | 1918 | 21 | 22 | 1922 | 1923 | 1924 | 1929 | 1931 | 1935 | 42 | 1945 |
|---|---|---|---|---|---|---|---|---|---|---|---|
| Abingdon | Wigan | A. T. Loyd | | | Lessing | Glyn | | | | | |
| Newbury | W. A. Mount | | Brown | | Stranger | Brown | | | | | Hurd |
| Reading | Wilson | | | Cadogan | Hastings | Williams | Hastings | Howitt | | | Mikardo |
| Windsor | Gardner | | | Somerville | | | | | | Mott-Radclyffe | |

=== 1950 to 1979 ===
Conservative Labour

| Constituency | 1950 | 1951 | 53 | 1955 | 1959 | 1964 | 1966 | 1970 | Feb 74 | Oct 74 | 1979 |
|---|---|---|---|---|---|---|---|---|---|---|---|
| Abingdon | Glyn | | Neave | | | | | | | | T. Benyon |
| Newbury | Hurd | | | | | Astor | | | McNair-Wilson | | |
| Reading North | K. Mackay | Bennett | | | | | | | Durant | | |
| Reading South (1950–55, 74–83) / Reading (1955–74) | Mikardo | | | | Emery | | Lee | Vaughan | | | |
| Windsor / Windsor and Maidenhead (1974) | Mott-Radclyffe | | | | | | | Glyn | | | |
| Wokingham | Remnant | | | | van Straubenzee | | | | | | |

=== 1983 to present ===
Conservative Labour Liberal Democrats

| Constituency | 1983 | 1987 | 1992 | 93 | 1997 | 2001 | 2005 | 2010 | 2015 | 2017 | 19 | 2019 | 2024 |
|---|---|---|---|---|---|---|---|---|---|---|---|---|---|
| East Berkshire / Bracknell (1997) | A. MacKay | | | | | | | Lee | | | → | Sunderland | Swallow |
| Newbury | McNair-Wilson | | Chaplin | Rendel | | | R. Benyon | | | | | Farris | Dillon |
| Reading East / R Central (2024) | Vaughan | | | | Griffiths | | Wilson | | | Rodda | | | |
| Reading W / RW & Mid Berks ('24) | Durant | | | | Salter | | | Sharma | | | | | Bailey |
| Slough | Watts | | | | Mactaggart | | | | | Dhesi | | | |
| Wr & Maidenhead / Windsor (1997)^{1} | Glyn | | Trend | | | | Afriyie | | | | | | Rankin |
| Wokingham | van Straubenzee | Redwood | | | | | | | | | | | Jones |
| Maidenhead | | | | | May | | | | | | | | Reynolds |
| Earley and Woodley | | | | | | | | | | | | | Yang |

^{1}from 2024 this includes areas of Surrey

== See also ==
- List of parliamentary constituencies in the South East (region)
- History of parliamentary constituencies and boundaries in Berkshire
