= History of parliamentary constituencies and boundaries in Berkshire =

The ceremonial county of Berkshire currently comprises the unitary authorities of Bracknell Forest, Reading, Slough, West Berkshire, Windsor and Maidenhead and Wokingham. From 2024, it has returned nine MPs to the UK Parliament, including one which is shared with the county of Surrey.

As a result of the local government reorganisation introduced by the Local Government Act 1972, which came into effect on 1 April 1974, the boundaries of the historic/administrative county were substantially altered. Northern parts of the county were transferred to Oxfordshire while southernmost parts of Buckinghamshire, including the Borough of Slough, were added. This was reflected in the following redistribution of parliamentary seats which came into effect for the 1983 general election.

== Number of seats ==
The table below shows the number of MPs representing Berkshire at each major redistribution of seats affecting the county.

Year	County seats (Note: Prior to 1950, seats were classified as County Divisions or Parliamentary Boroughs. Since 1950, they have been classified as County or Borough Constituencies.)	Borough seats	Total
Prior to 1832	2	7	9
1832–1868	3	6	9
1868–1885	3	5	8
1885–1918	3	2	5
1918–1950	3	1	4
1950–1955	4	2	6
1955–1974	4	1	5
1974–1983	5	1	6
1983–1997	6	1	7
1997–2024	6	2	8
2024–present	6	3	9 (Note: Includes one cross-county border constituency shared with Surrey.)

== Timeline ==
County seat Borough seat

Constituency	Prior to 1832	1832–1868	1868–1885	1885–1918	1918–1950	1950–1955	1955–1974	1974–1983	1983–1997	1997–2024	2024–present
Berkshire	1265–1832 (2 MPs)	1832–1885 (3 MPs)									
Wallingford	1295–1832 (2 MPs)	1832–1885									
Abingdon	1558–1885			1885–1983					Part of Oxfordshire from April 1974		
Newbury				1885–present							
Reading West and Mid Berkshire											2024–present
Reading West									1983–2024		
Reading North						1950–1955		1974–1983			
Reading Central											2024–present
Reading	1295–1885 (2 MPs)			1885–1950			1955–1974				
Reading South						1950–1955		1974–1983			
Reading East									1983–1997	1997–2024	
Earley and Woodley											2024–present
Wokingham				1885–1918		1950–present					
East Berkshire									1983–1997		
Bracknell										1997–present	
Maidenhead										1997–present	
Windsor and Maidenhead								1974–1997			
Windsor	1424–1868 (2 MPs)		1868–1918		1918–1974					1997–present	
Slough	Part of Buckinghamshire prior to April 1974 (Eton and Slough)								1983–present		

== Boundary reviews ==
Prior to 1832	Since 1265, the parliamentary county of Berkshire, along with all other English counties regardless of size or population, had elected two MPs (knights of the shire) to the House of Commons. The parliamentary boroughs of Reading, Wallingford and Windsor (formally known as New Windsor) had also each returned two MPs (burgesses) continuously since at least 1424. Abingdon (which was partly in Oxfordshire) had returned one MP since 1558 (one of only three single-member English Boroughs to do so).	
1832	The Reform Act 1832 radically changed the representation of the House of Commons. The county's representation was increased to three MPs, whilst that of Wallingford was reduced to one MP.	
1868	Under the Representation of the People Act 1867, the representation of Windsor was also reduced to one MP, at the same time expanding its boundaries to include Clewer and Eton (the latter being north of the River Thames in Buckinghamshire).	
1885	Under the Redistribution of Seats Act 1885, the county was divided into three single-member constituencies, namely the Northern or Abingdon Division, the Southern or Newbury Division and the Eastern or Wokingham Division. The Boroughs of Wallingford and Abingdon were abolished and absorbed into the county seat of Abingdon. Reading had its representation reduced to one MP.	Berkshire 1885–1918
1918	Under the Representation of the People Act 1918, New Windsor was abolished as a Parliamentary Borough and replaced by the county Division of Windsor. Eton was now included in the Wycombe Division of Buckinghamshire. The Wokingham division was also abolished, with the majority of the seat, including Maidenhead being added to Windsor. The Municipal Borough of Wokingham itself was added to Newbury. Reading was expanded in line with the County Borough, including the absorption of Caversham, to the north of the River Thames, which had previously been part of the Henley Division of Oxfordshire.	Berkshire 1918–1950
1950	The Representation of the People Act 1948 increased the county's representation from four to six MPs. Reading was split into the two constituencies of Reading North and Reading South. Wokingham was re-established, comprising the borough of Wokingham and rural areas to the south and east of Reading, transferred from Newbury, and extending eastwards to include the Rural District of Easthampstead (which incorporated Bracknell), transferred from Windsor.	Berkshire 1950–1955
1955	Under the First Periodic Review of Westminster Constituencies Reading North and Reading South were recombined, with one ward of the county borough being included in each of the Newbury and Wokingham constituencies.	Berkshire 1955–1974
1974	Under the Second Periodic Review, representation was increased back up to six MPs with the re-creation of Reading North and Reading South. The County Borough wards in Newbury and Wokingham were returned whilst Reading South was extended southwards to include parts of the Rural District of Wokingham, transferred from the constituency thereof.	Berkshire 1974–1983
1983	The Third Review reflected the changes to the county of Berkshire resulting from the Local Government Act 1972 and saw major changes. The bulk of the area comprising the constituency of Abingdon had been moved to Oxfordshire, with the majority of its contents, including Wantage, Wallingford, Didcot and Faringdon, being included in the new constituency of Wantage. The town of Abingdon-on-Thames itself, together with areas to the west of Oxford, was included in the new constituency of Oxford West and Abingdon. The small part which was retained in Berkshire was transferred to Newbury. The county had absorbed the Municipal Borough of Slough and the small Urban District of Eton (which together had comprised the constituency of Eton and Slough) from Buckinghamshire. Slough was now formed as a new seat and Eton was added back to Windsor. A new constituency of East Berkshire was created, largely comprising the Borough of Bracknell (formerly the Rural District of Easthampstead), together with Old Windsor and Sunningdale, transferred from Windsor and Maidenhead. In addition, it included the parts of the former Rural District of Eton (including Datchet) which had also been transferred from Buckinghamshire to Berkshire and were previously part of the constituency of Beaconsfield. Reading North and Reading South were abolished once again and replaced by Reading East and Reading West. Reading East was formed largely from Reading South, but also included Caversham from Reading North. Reading West was formed largely from Reading North and extended westwards to include parts of Newbury. North-western parts of Reading South were transferred back to Wokingham.	Berkshire 1983–1997
1997	The Fourth Review resulted in a further increase from seven to eight MPs with the abolition of Windsor and Maidenhead and the creation of the two separate seats of Maidenhead and Windsor. Maidenhead included Bisham and Cookham, and was extended westwards to include northern parts of Wokingham. Windsor included Bray, Eton and the Slough ward of Foxborough. It was extended southwards to include parts of East Berkshire (Datchet, Old Windsor, Sunningdale and Ascot). East Berkshire was abolished with remaining parts forming the basis of the new constituency of Bracknell, which also included the ward of Wokingham Without, transferred from Wokingham, and Finchampstead, transferred from Reading East. Reading East gained parts in the east of the borough from Wokingham in exchange for areas to the south, including Shinfield. It also gained the borough ward of Katesgrove from Reading West in exchange for the ward of Whitley. Newbury transferred two wards to Wokingham.	Berkshire 1997–2010
2010	The Fifth Review saw only modest changes, including the transfer of Bray from Windsor to Maidenhead, Binfield from Bracknell to Windsor and the return of Foxborough ward from Windsor to Slough. There were further marginal changes due to revision of local authority wards.	Berkshire 2010–2024
2024	For the 2023 Periodic Review of Westminster constituencies, which redrew the constituency map ahead of the 2024 United Kingdom general election, the Boundary Commission for England opted to combine Berkshire with Hampshire and Surrey as a sub-region of the South East Region. As a result, Windsor now included Englefield Green and Virginia Water in the Surrey borough of Runnymede. The number of constituencies was increased from eight to nine with the creation of Earley and Woodley, which principally incorporated areas of Reading East (Woodley) and Wokingham (Earley and Shinfield) with small parts of Reading West and Maidenhead. To compensate Reading East (renamed Reading Central), three Reading Borough wards were transferred from Reading West. In turn, Reading West gained parts of Newbury and Wokingham, including the village of Burghfield, and was renamed Reading West and Mid Berkshire. Further changes included: Finchampstead from Bracknell to Wokingham; Twyford from Maidenhead to Wokingham; Ascot from Windsor to Maidenhead; and; two Slough Borough wards from Slough to Windsor.	Berkshire 2024–present

== See also ==
- List of parliamentary constituencies in Berkshire
