= 2010 Reading Borough Council election =

2010 UK local government election

← 2008	6 May 2010	2011 →

15 out of 46 seats to Reading Borough Council 24 seats needed for a majority
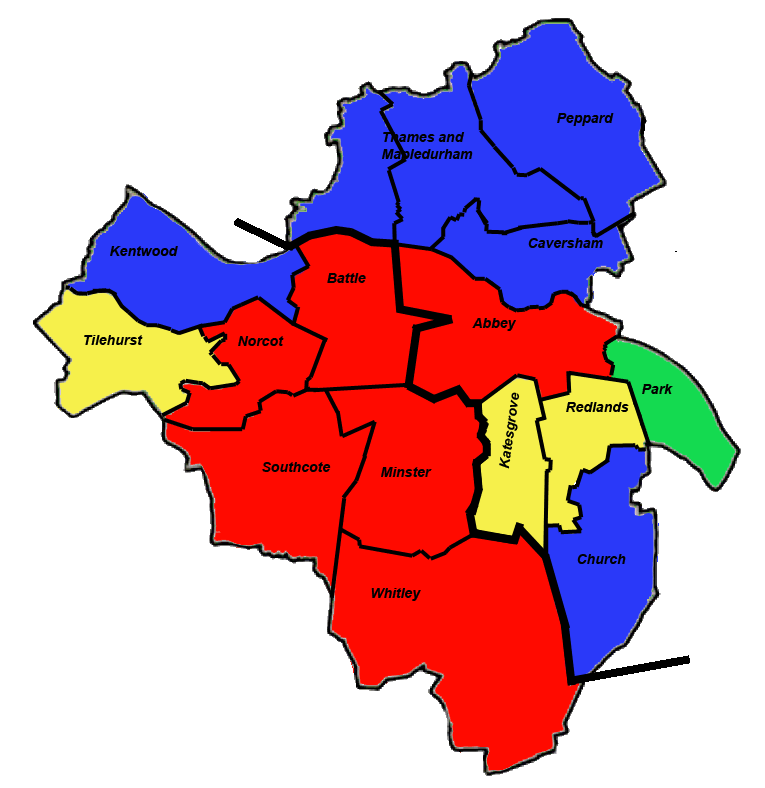
- Winner of each seat at the 2010 Reading Borough Council election

Elections to Reading Borough Council took place on 6 May 2010 under the backdrop of the 2010 general election, with 15 council seats up for election. The Labour Party continued to lose seats, losing Katesgrove ward to the Liberal Democrats and Park ward to the Green Party. The Conservatives held all their seats apart from Minster ward which was a surprise gain by Labour.

The election resulted in Reading Borough Council being left in no overall control. Shortly after the election the Conservatives and Liberal Democrats announced they would form a coalition to govern locally, ending over two decades of Labour control.

== Election result ==
Reading Borough Council election, 2010
Party	Seats	Gains	Losses	Net gain/loss	Seats %	Votes %	Votes	+/−
Conservative	5	0	1	-1	33.3%	35.1%	23,489	-5.1%
Labour	6	2	2	0	40.0%	31.1%	20,793	-0.9%
Liberal Democrats	3	1	0	+1	20.0%	25.6%	17,128	+8.1%
Green	1	1	0	+1	6.6%	6.6%	4,453	-1.4%
Common Sense	0	0	0	0	0.0%	0.6%	440	-0.1%
UKIP	0	0	0	0	0.0%	0.6%	428	+0.6%
Independent	0	0	1	-1	0.0%	0.0%	44	-0.9%
The Roman Party Ave!	0	0	0	0	0.0%	0.0%	26	-0.6%

== Ward results ==
Abbey Ward
Party	Candidate	Votes	%	±%
Labour	Bet Tickner	1,612	36.9%	−11.1%
Conservative	Andrew Waters	1,285	29.5%	−2.5%
Liberal Democrats	Jane Marsden	1,258	28.9%	+18.0%
Green	Mark Walker	206	4.7%	−3.2%
Majority		327	7.4%	
Turnout		4,361	53%	
Labour hold		Swing	-6.8%	

Battle Ward
Party	Candidate	Votes	%	±%
Labour	Sarah-Jane Hacker	1,778	46.0%	−2.5%
Conservative	Ali Asghar	935	24.1%	−1.8%
Liberal Democrats	Uda Chalk	804	20.7%	+7.2%
Green	Alan Lockey	175	4.5%	−7.1%
Common Sense	Michael Diamond	155	4.0%	+4.0%
The Roman Party Ave!	Jean-Louis Pascual	26	0.6%	+0.6%
Majority		843	21.9%	
Turnout		3,873	56%	
Labour gain from Independent		Swing	-2.2%	

Caversham Ward
Party	Candidate	Votes	%	±%
Conservative	Andrew Cumpsty	1,979	41.7%	−9.5%
Liberal Democrats	Christopher Burden	1,336	28.1%	+17.1%
Labour	Lesley Owen	1,142	24.0%	−3.8%
Green	David Patterson	289	6.1%	−4.0%
Majority		643	13.6%	
Turnout		4,746	67.0%	
Conservative hold		Swing	-13.3%	

Church Ward
Party	Candidate	Votes	%	±%
Conservative	Tim Harris	1,465	39.7%	−5.6%
Labour	Malcolm Powers	1,185	32.1%	−4.5%
Liberal Democrats	Mark Whiley	844	22.9%	+12.9%
Green	Vivienne Johnson	187	5.0%	−2.7%
Majority		280	7.6%	
Turnout		3,681	54.0%	
Conservative hold		Swing	-5.0%	

Katesgrove Ward
Party	Candidate	Votes	%	±%
Liberal Democrats	Rebecca Rye	1,302	36.0%	−2.7%
Labour	Matt Rodda	1,224	33.9%	−3.2%
Conservative	Emily Fraser	867	24.0%	+6.6%
Green	Volker Heinemann	172	4.7%	+0.1%
Independent	Michael Turberville	44	1.2%	+1.2%
Majority		78	0.1%	
Turnout		3,609	54.0%	
Liberal Democrats gain from Labour		Swing	-2.9%	

Kentwood Ward
Party	Candidate	Votes	%	±%
Conservative	Jenny Rynn	1,971	41.6%	−4.8%
Labour	Daya Pal Singh	1,366	28.8%	+3.8%
Liberal Democrats	Margaret McNeill	972	20.5%	+5.5%
Common Sense	Howard Thomas	285	6.0%	−3.2%
Green	Eloise Murray-Robertson	142	2.9%	−1.1%
Majority		605	12.8%	
Turnout		4,736	64.0%	
Conservative hold		Swing	-4.3%	

Minster Ward
Party	Candidate	Votes	%	±%
Labour	Marian Livingstone	1,722	38.6%	−5.7%
Conservative	Simon Bazley	1,648	37.0%	−5.3%
Liberal Democrats	Michael Taylor	903	20.2%	+11.6%
Green	Sunil Gandhi	187	4.2%	+0.1%
Majority		74	1.6%	
Turnout		4,460	62.0%	
Labour gain from Conservative		Swing	-5.5%	

Norcot Ward
Party	Candidate	Votes	%	±%
Labour	Peter Jones	1,915	44.6%	−6.4%
Conservative	Nazir Bashir	1,261	29.4%	−4.2%
Liberal Democrats	Julie Hopkins	910	21.2%	+11.7%
Green	Jennifer Lawrence	203	4.7%	−0.9%
Majority		654	15.2%	
Turnout		4,289	61.0%	
Labour hold		Swing	-5.3%	

Park Ward
Party	Candidate	Votes	%	±%
Green	Rob White	1,845	38.8%	+5.8%
Labour	Richard McKenzie	1,275	26.8%	−7.0%
Conservative	John Walker	828	17.4%	−6.0%
Liberal Democrats	Alexander Kirke	804	16.9%	+7.4%
Majority		570	12.0%	
Turnout		4,752	66.0%	
Green gain from Labour		Swing	+6.4%	

Peppard Ward
Party	Candidate	Votes	%	±%
Conservative	Mark Ralph	2,941	53.1%	−2.9%
Liberal Democrats	Pauline Callow	1,400	25.3%	−7.4%
Labour	Helen Hathaway	840	15.1%	+7.7%
UKIP	John Dearing	188	3.3%	+3.3%
Green	Patrick Little	161	2.9%	−0.6%
Majority		1,541	27.8%	
Turnout		5,530	74%	
Conservative hold		Swing	-5.5%	

Redlands Ward
Party	Candidate	Votes	%	±%
Liberal Democrats	Daisy Benson	1,867	44.0%	+3.9%
Labour	Kelly Edwards	1,105	26.0%	−5.9%
Conservative	Leo Lester	1,006	23.7%	+2.2%
Green	Miriam Kennet	264	6.2%	−0.7%
Majority		762	18.0%	
Turnout		4,242	59.0%	
Liberal Democrats hold		Swing	+4.9%	

Southcote Ward
Party	Candidate	Votes	%	±%
Labour	John Ennis	1,836	45.3%	−5.4%
Conservative	Robert Vickers	1,466	36.2%	−4.3%
Liberal Democrats	Susan Bicknell	638	15.7%	+10.5%
Green	James Towell	108	2.6%	−0.6%
Majority		370	9.1%	
Turnout		4,048	65.0%	
Labour hold		Swing	-4.8%	

Thames Ward
Party	Candidate	Votes	%	±%
Conservative	David Stevens	2,878	51.5%	−13.6%
Liberal Democrats	Guy Penman	1,503	26.9%	+14.6%
Labour	Nicholas Stringer	933	16.7%	+1.8%
Green	Danny McNamara	267	4.8%	−2.7%
Majority		1,375	24.6%	
Turnout		5,581	77%	
Conservative hold		Swing	-14.1%	

Tilehurst Ward
Party	Candidate	Votes	%	±%
Liberal Democrats	Ricky Duveen	1,920	40.0%	−1.9%
Conservative	Sandra Vickers	1,663	34.6%	−4.1%
Labour	Haji Banaras	860	17.9%	+2.6%
UKIP	Daniel Thomas	240	5.0%	+5.0%
Green	Doug Cresswell	113	2.3%	−1.5%
Majority		257	5.4%	
Turnout		4,796	67%	
Liberal Democrats hold		Swing	-3%	

Whitley Ward
Party	Candidate	Votes	%	±%
Labour	Rachel Eden	1,980	48.4%	−5.1%
Conservative	James Anderson	1,306	31.9%	−1.8%
Liberal Democrats	Roy Haines	667	16.3%	+9.7%
Green	Keith Martin Johnson	134	3.2%	−2.5%
Majority		674	16.5%	
Turnout		4,087	54%	
Labour hold		Swing	-3.4%	
