= 2008 Reading Borough Council election =

← 2007	1 May 2008	2010 →

16 out of 46 seats to Reading Borough Council 24 seats needed for a majority
- Winner of each seat at the 2008 Reading Borough Council election

The 2008 Reading Borough Council election to the Reading Borough Council resulted in gains for the Conservatives and the Liberal Democrats and losses for the Labour Party. The Labour leader of the council, David Sutton, lost his seat in the election.

== Results ==
Reading Borough Council Election, 2008
Party	Seats	Gains	Losses	Net gain/loss	Seats %	Votes %	Votes	+/−
Conservative	6	+4	0	+4	37.5%	40.5%	15,466	+2.2%
Labour	7	0	5	-4	43.7%	32.2%	12,321	+0.2%
Liberal Democrats	3	+2	1	+1	18.7%	17.6%	6,729	-2.3%
Green	0	0	0	0	0%	8.0%	3,061	-0.8%
Independent	0	0	0	0	0%	0.9%	345	-1.4%
Common Sense	0	0	0	0	0%	0.6%	247	+0.6%
The Roman Party Ave!	0	0	0	0	0%	0.4%	18	-0.5%

=== Ward results ===
Abbey Ward
Party	Candidate	Votes	%	±%
Labour	Tony Page	968	48.0%	+10.1%
Conservative	Andrew Waters	646	32.0%	−0.8%
Liberal Democrats	Benjamin Mathis	221	10.9%	−4.1%
Green	Douglas Cresswell	160	7.9%	−4.4%
The Roman Party Ave!	Jean Louis Pascual	18	0.9%	+0.9
Majority		322	16.0%	
Turnout		2,015	28%	
Labour hold		Swing	+5.4%	

Battle Ward
Party	Candidate	Votes	%	±%
Labour	Gul Khan	911	48.5%	−2.9%
Conservative	Ali Asghar	486	25.9%	+2.0%
Liberal Democrats	Andrew Parsons	253	13.4%	+1.3%
Green	Adrian Windisch	219	11.6%	−1.8%
Majority		425	22.6%	
Turnout		1,876	27.3%	
Labour hold		Swing	-2.4%	

Caversham Ward
Party	Candidate	Votes	%	±%
Conservative	David Luckett	1,257	51.2%	+0.9%
Labour	Matt Rodda	669	27.2%	−1.0%
Liberal Democrats	Christopher Burden	271	11.0%	−0.4%
Green	David Patterson	250	10.2%	+0.3%
Majority		588	24.0%	
Turnout		2,453	35.8%	
Conservative gain from Labour		Swing	+1.0%	

Church Ward
Party	Candidate	Votes	%	±%
Conservative	Azam Janjua	969	45.3%	−2.0%
Labour	Marian Livingston	782	36.6%	−0.2%
Liberal Democrats	Karl Hobley	215	10.0%	+1.0%
Green	Vivienne Joyce Johnson	166	7.7%	+1.1%
Majority		187	8.7%	
Turnout		2,136	28.5%	
Conservative gain from Labour		Swing	-1.1%	

Katesgrove Ward
Party	Candidate	Votes	%	±%
Liberal Democrats	Warren Swaine	757	38.7%	+4.0%
Labour	David Sutton	727	37.1%	+4.4%
Conservative	Nicholas Allen	341	17.4%	+3.3%
Green	Russell Seymour	90	4.6%	−9.3%
Independent	David Boobier	35	1.7%	−2.7%
Majority		30	1.6%	
Turnout		1955	31%	
Liberal Democrats gain from Labour		Swing	-0.4%	

Kentwood Ward
Party	Candidate	Votes	%	±%
Conservative	Emma Warman	1,238	46.5%	+2.3%
Labour	Richard McKenzie	667	25.0%	−8.6%
Liberal Democrats	Matthew Platts	402	15.0%	−2.4%
Common Sense	Howard Thomas	247	9.2%	+9.2%
Green	Kevin Jackson	107	4.0%	−0.6%
Majority		571	21.5%	
Turnout		2666	37%	
Conservative gain from Labour		Swing	+5.5%	

Mapledurham Ward
Party	Candidate	Votes	%	±%
Conservative	Fred Pugh	821	61.0%	−3.1%
Independent	Robert (Bob) O'Neill	310	23.0%	+23.0%
Liberal Democrats	Michael Eggleton	121	8.9%	−15.3%
Labour	Daya Pal Singh	67	4.9%	−6.6%
Green	Caroline Anscombe	27	2.0%	+2.0%
Majority		511	38.0%	
Turnout		1346	55%	
Conservative hold		Swing	-13.0%	

Minster Ward
Party	Candidate	Votes	%	±%
Labour	Deborah Watson	1,186	44.7%	+0.9%
Conservative	Philip Webb	1,115	42.0%	+3.0%
Liberal Democrats	Michael Taylor	229	8.6%	−0.4%
Green	Sunil Gandhi	114	4.2%	−3.8%
Majority		71	2.7%	
Turnout		2653	38%	
Labour hold		Swing	-2.1%	

Norcot Ward
Party	Candidate	Votes	%	±%
Labour	Josephine Lovelock	1,171	51.0%	+1.0%
Conservative	James Cox	773	33.6%	+4.6%
Liberal Democrats	Mark Mills	219	9.5%	−3.6%
Green	Mark Walker	129	5.6%	−2.0%
Majority		398	17.4%	
Turnout		2296	32.7%	
Labour hold		Swing	-3.6%	

Park Ward
Party	Candidate	Votes	%	±%
Labour	Jon Hartley	1,014	33.7%	+3.1%
Green	Rob White	994	33.1%	+7.1%
Conservative	Martyn Washbourne	704	23.4%	−7.4%
Liberal Democrats	Neal Brown	286	9.5%	−2.9%
Majority		20	0.6%	
Turnout		3006	43.8%	
Labour hold		Swing	-4.0%	

Peppard Ward
Party	Candidate	Votes	%	±%
Conservative	Amjad (Jamie) Chowdhary	1,857	56.0%	+5.1%
Liberal Democrats	Annette Hendry	1,086	32.7%	−4.3%
Labour	Helen Hathaway	246	7.4%	+0.9%
Green	Patrick Little	116	3.5%	+1.1%
Majority		771	23.3%	
Turnout		3,314	45.3%	
Conservative gain from Liberal Democrats		Swing	-4.7%	

Redlands Ward
Party	Candidate	Votes	%	±%
Liberal Democrats	Glenn Goodall	927	40.1%	−1.1%
Labour	Peter Kayes	736	31.9%	−1.6%
Conservative	Laurence Taylor	475	20.5%	+4.6%
Green	Gabriel Berry	160	6.9%	−0.1%
Majority		191	8.2%	
Turnout		2,307	32%	
Liberal Democrats gain from Labour		Swing	+0.5%	

Southcote Ward
Party	Candidate	Votes	%	±%
Labour	Deborah Edwards	1,333	50.6%	+3.9%
Conservative	Alan Hawkins	1,067	40.5%	−0.3%
Liberal Democrats	Guy William Gipps Penman	139	5.2%	2.4%
Green	James Towell	85	3.2%	−1.4%
Majority		266	10.1%	
Turnout		2630	43%	
Labour hold		Swing	+2.1%	

Thames Ward
Party	Candidate	Votes	%	±%
Conservative	Isobel Ballsdon	2,107	65.0%	+1.3%
Labour	Susan Stainthorpe	484	14.9%	+2.0%
Liberal Democrats	Pauline Arthur	398	12.2%	−2.6%
Green	Daniel McNamara	243	7.5%	+1.2%
Majority		1,623	50.1%	
Turnout		3,237	45.6%	
Conservative hold		Swing	-0.7%	

Tilehurst Ward
Party	Candidate	Votes	%	±%
Liberal Democrats	Peter Beard	1,085	41.8%	
Conservative	Sandra Vickers	1,004	38.7%	
Labour	Raymond Richens	397	15.3%	
Green	Hugh Swann	97	3.7%	
Majority		81	3.1%	
Turnout		2,590	36%	
Liberal Democrats hold		Swing		

Whitley Ward
Party	Candidate	Votes	%	±%
Labour	Mike Orton	963	53.5%	
Conservative	James Wyman	606	33.6%	
Liberal Democrats	Christopher Brown	120	6.6%	
Green	Keith Martin Johnson	104	5.7%	
Majority		357	19.9%	
Turnout		1,799	24.9%	
Labour hold		Swing		
