= 1987 Reading Borough Council election =

← 1986	7 May 1987	1988 →

15 seats of 45 on council 23 seats needed for a majority
	First party	Second party	Third party
	Lab	Con	Lib
Leader	Mike Orton	Geoff Canning	Jim Day
Party	Labour	Conservative	Liberal
Alliance			Alliance
Seats before	22	17	6
Seats after	24	16	5
Seat change	▲2	▼1	▼1
Popular vote	14,358	18,993	12,343
Percentage	31.0%	41.0%	26.7%
Swing	▼5.4%	▲8.2%	▼1.8%

The 1987 Reading Borough Council election was held on 7 May 1987, at the same time as other local elections across England and Wales. One third of Reading Borough Council's 45 seats were up for election.

Before the election, the council was under no overall control with Labour running a minority administration, being one seat short of an overall majority. The election saw Labour gain two extra seats, giving it a majority. After the election, Labour had 24 seats, the Conservatives had 16 seats, and the SDP-Liberal Alliance had 5 seats, all of whom were Liberals.

== Results ==
Reading Borough Council Election, 1987
Party	Seats	Gains	Losses	Net gain/loss	Seats %	Votes %	Votes	+/−
Labour	7	2	0	+2	46.7	31.0	14,358	-5.4
Conservative	6	1	2	-1	40.0	41.0	18,993	+8.2
Alliance	2	1	2	-1	13.3	26.7	12,343	-1.8
Green	0				0.0	1.3	615	+1.0

=== Ward results ===
The results in each ward were as follows (candidates with an asterisk* were the previous incumbent standing for re-election:

Abbey Ward
Party	Candidate	Votes	%	±%
Labour	Antony William Page* (Tony Page)	1,258	46.4	−8.4
Conservative	Subhash Vasant Nirgude	855	33.2	+12.4
SDP	Jeremy B.C. Lazenby	432	16.8	−0.9
Green	Elizabeth Maria Callies (Maria Callies)	95	3.7	−3.1
Turnout		2,578		
Labour hold		Swing	-10.4	

Battle Ward
Party	Candidate	Votes	%	±%
Labour	Kevin Joseph P. MacDevitt	1,147	47.0	−4.4
Conservative	Susan E. White (Sue White)	762	31.2	+10.8
SDP	Angela S. Peirson	463	19.0	−4.8
Green	Lorraine M. Munn	70	2.9	−1.7
Turnout		2,442		
Labour hold		Swing	-7.6	

Caversham Ward
Party	Candidate	Votes	%	±%
Conservative	Ronald William Jewitt* (Ron Jewitt)	2,513	67.2	+12.5
Labour	Geoffrey Robert Mander (Geoff Mander)	711	19.0	−8.0
SDP	Mary E. Hargreaves	514	13.8	−4.5
Turnout		3,738		
Conservative hold		Swing	+10.25	

Church Ward
Party	Candidate	Votes	%	±%
Labour	Kathleen Margaret Everett* (Kay Everett)	1,093	46.4	−5.0
Conservative	Heather M. Oliver	799	33.9	+6.8
Liberal	Diarmuid T. O'Rourke	465	19.7	−1.8
Turnout		2,357		
Labour hold		Swing	-5.9	

Katesgrove Ward
Party	Candidate	Votes	%	±%
Labour	Margaret Stella Singh*	1,073	46.9	−9.6
Conservative	Shirley M. Mills	884	38.6	+9.0
SDP	Nikola Sergt	332	14.5	+0.6
Turnout		2,289		
Labour hold		Swing	-9.3	

Kentwood Ward
Party	Candidate	Votes	%	±%
Liberal	Francis John William Mahon-Daly (Frank Mahon-Daly)	1,309	42.4	−1.4
Conservative	Thomas J. Dicker* (Tom Dicker)	1,253	40.6	+9.7
Labour	Ronald W. Corbin	528	17.1	−8.4
Turnout		3,090		
Liberal gain from Conservative		Swing	-9.05	

Minster Ward
Party	Candidate	Votes	%	±%
Conservative	Derek Gordon E. Browne	1,573	49.8	+7.7
Labour	Martin Bryan Statter (Bryan Statter)	883	27.9	−7.1
SDP	Stephen R. Hanson (Steve Hanson)	661	20.9	+1.4
Green	Edmund P. Wilson (Ed Wilson)	43	1.4	−2.0
Turnout		3,160		
Conservative hold		Swing	+7.4	

Norcot Ward
Party	Candidate	Votes	%	±%
Labour	Rhodri Hughes	1,392	43.7	−0.2
Liberal	Leslie Basil Dunning* (Basil Dunning)	1,067	33.5	−3.8
Conservative	Garry Cooper	668	21.0	+4.4
Green	Maureen P. Gray	58	1.8	−0.4
Turnout		3,185		
Labour gain from Liberal		Swing	+1.8	

Park Ward
Party	Candidate	Votes	%	±%
Labour	Michael Derek Price (Mike Price)	1,585	47.7	−3.7
Conservative	Amanda A. Vigar	1,096	33.0	+2.1
Liberal	Stephen H. Begg (Steve Begg)	522	15.7	+3.7
Green	Philip J. Unsworth	117	3.5	−2.1
Turnout		3,320		
Labour gain from Conservative		Swing	-2.9	

Peppard Ward
Party	Candidate	Votes	%	±%
Conservative	Frank Heyes	2,014	47.6	+5.6
Liberal	Ian M. Fenwick*	1,885	44.5	−2.1
Labour	Louise M. Izzard	335	7.9	−3.6
Turnout		4,234		
Conservative gain from Liberal		Swing	+3.85	

Redlands Ward
Party	Candidate	Votes	%	±%
Conservative	John Michael Oliver*	1,212	34.2	+6.1
Labour	David Christopher Sutton	1,187	33.5	−0.6
SDP	David J. Cornes	1,033	29.2	−3.0
Green	Daverick C. Leggett	107	3.0	−2.6
Turnout		3,539		
Conservative hold		Swing	+3.35	

Southcote Ward
Party	Candidate	Votes	%	±%
Conservative	Peter W. Wells	1,556	47.0	+10.5
Labour	Katharine Neville (Kathy Neville)	1,362	41.1	−2.9
SDP	Andrew H. McLuskey	392	11.8	−7.6
Turnout		3,310		
Conservative hold		Swing	+6.7	

Thames Ward
Party	Candidate	Votes	%	±%
Conservative	Kenneth A. Putt (Ken Putt)	2,122	57.2	+5.9
Liberal	Annette Hendry	1,187	32.0	−3.3
Labour	Alan E. Lockey	275	7.4	−1.2
Green	Louise A. Barnes	125	3.4	−1.4
Turnout		3,709		
Conservative hold		Swing	+4.6	

Tilehurst Ward
Party	Candidate	Votes	%	±%
Liberal	Florence Teresa Day* (Paddy Day)	1,751	55.9	−3.6
Conservative	David F. Henderson	985	31.4	+7.3
Labour	Richard J. O'Brien (Dick O'Brien)	397	12.7	−3.7
Turnout		3,133		
Liberal hold		Swing	-5.45	

Whitley Ward
Party	Candidate	Votes	%	±%
Labour	Doris Ellen Lawrence*	1,194	53.7	−11.5
Conservative	Walter Eric Winter (Eric Winter)	701	31.5	+13.1
SDP	John W. Wood	330	14.8	−1.6
Turnout		2,225		
Labour hold		Swing	-12.3	
