= 2011 Reading Borough Council election =

2011 UK local government election

- 5 May 2011

15 out of 46 seats to Reading Borough Council 24 seats needed for a majority
- Turnout: 40%
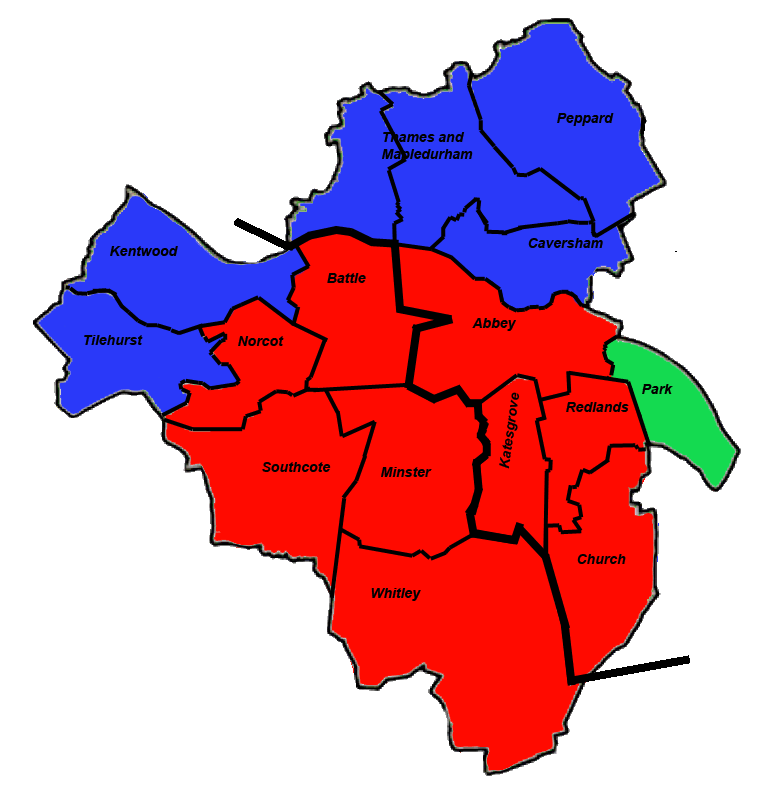
- Winner of each seat at the 2011 Reading Borough Council election

Elections to Reading Borough Council took place on Thursday 5 May 2011. There were 15 seats up for election, one third of the council. The election meant that the council continued to have no overall control but a Labour led minority administration replaced the previous Conservative Liberal Democrat coalition. The posts of leader of the council and mayor were filled at a meeting of the council on 25 May 2011. Labour member Deborah Edwards was elected mayor on the casting vote of outgoing mayor, Gul Khan. Councillor Edwards then used her casting vote in favour of the new Leader of the council, Jo Lovelock. The two Green Party councillors abstained in both votes.

After the election, the composition of the council was:

Party	Seats	+/-
Labour	22	+3
Conservative	16	-1
Liberal Democrats	5	-4
Green Party	2	+1
Independent	1	+1 (Note: This figure refers to a Liberal Democrat councillor suspended from the party at the time of the election.)
No overall control hold		

== Election result ==
Reading Borough Council election, 2011
Party	Seats	Gains	Losses	Net gain/loss	Seats %	Votes %	Votes	+/−
Labour	9	3	0	+3	60.0%	39.9%	17,788	+8.8%
Conservative	5	1	2	-1	33.3%	34.1%	15,223	-1.1%
Liberal Democrats	0	0	3	-3	0.0%	12.8%	5,719	-12.8%
Green	1	1	0	+1	6.7%	11.2%	4,999	+4.5%
Common Sense Party	0	0	0	±0	0.0%	1.8%	816	+1.2%
Independent	0	0	0	±0	0.0%	0.1%	36	+0.0%
The Roman Party Ave!	0	0	0	±0	0.0%	0.1%	30	+0.0%

== Ward results ==
Abbey Ward
Party	Candidate	Votes	%	±%
Labour	Mohammed Ayub	1,298	46.7%	+9.8%
Conservative	Richard Nante	699	25.2%	−4.3%
Liberal Democrats	George Hughes	369	13.3%	−15.6%
Green	Vivienne Johnson	293	10.5%	+5.8%
Common Sense Party	Bob O'Neill	119	4.3%	N/A
Majority		599	21.5%	
Turnout		2778	31%	
Labour hold		Swing	+7.1%	

Battle Ward
Party	Candidate	Votes	%	±%
Labour	Chris Maskell	1,373	53.1%	+7.2%
Conservative	Imraan Ishtiaq	690	26.7%	+2.6%
Liberal Democrats	John Oakley	230	8.9%	−11.9%
Green	Alan Edward Lockey	181	7.0%	+2.5%
Common Sense Party	Michael Diamond	81	3.1%	−0.9%
The Roman Party Ave!	Jean-Louis Pascual	30	1.2%	+0.5%
Majority		683	26.4%	
Turnout		2585	36%	
Labour hold		Swing	+2.3%	

Caversham Ward
Party	Candidate	Votes	%	±%
Conservative	Tom Stanway	1,335	42.8%	+1.1%
Labour	Esther Walters	977	31.4%	+7.3%
Green	Jenny Lawrence	438	14.1%	+8.0%
Liberal Democrats	Jenny Claire Woods	366	11.7%	−16.4%
Majority		358	11.4%	
Turnout		3116	43%	
Conservative hold		Swing	-3.1%	

Church Ward
Party	Candidate	Votes	%	±%
Labour	Paul Richard Woodward	1,229	45.1%	+12.9%
Conservative	Geoff Poland	901	33.1%	−6.7%
Common Sense Party	Kim Maysh	221	8.1%	N/A
Green	Jon Roberts	192	7.0%	+2.0%
Liberal Democrats	Anthony Warrell	181	6.6%	−16.3%
Majority		328	12.0%	
Turnout		2724	35%	
Labour gain from Conservative		Swing	+9.8%	

Katesgrove Ward
Party	Candidate	Votes	%	±%
Labour	Matt Rodda	1,100	46.3%	+12.3%
Liberal Democrats	Margaret McNeill	592	24.9%	−11.2%
Conservative	Leo Lester	431	18.1%	−5.9%
Green	Kizzi Murtagh	165	6.9%	+2.2%
Common Sense Party	Luis Mendiz	54	2.3%	N/A
Independent	Michael Turberville	36	1.5%	+0.3%
Majority		508	21.4%	
Turnout		2378	34%	
Labour gain from Liberal Democrats		Swing	+11.8%	

Kentwood Ward
Party	Candidate	Votes	%	±%
Conservative	James Anderson	1,369	44.4%	+2.7%
Labour	Daya Pal Singh	1,159	37.6%	+8.7%
Liberal Democrats	Meri O'Connell	247	8.0%	−12.5%
Green	Kevin Jackson	177	5.7%	+2.7%
Common Sense Party	Matthew James Plunkett	134	4.3%	−1.7%
Majority		210	6.8%	
Turnout		3086	39%	
Conservative hold		Swing	-3.0%	

Minster Ward
Party	Candidate	Votes	%	±%
Labour	Paul Stephen Gittings	1,447	47.9%	+9.3
Conservative	Alanzo Nesta Seville	1,066	35.3%	−1.6%
Liberal Democrats	Julie Hopkins	286	9.5%	−10.8%
Green	Sunil Gandhi	220	7.3%	+3.1%
Majority		381	12.6%	
Turnout		3019	41%	
Labour hold		Swing	+5.5%	

Norcot Ward
Party	Candidate	Votes	%	±%
Labour	Graeme William Hoskin	1,557	58.5%	+13.9%
Conservative	Naz Bashir	650	24.4%	−5.0%
Liberal Democrats	Roy Albert Teixeira Perestrelo	233	8.8%	−12.5%
Green	David James Patterson	220	8.3%	+3.5%
Majority		907	34.1%	
Turnout		2660	37%	
Labour hold		Swing	+9.5%	

Park Ward
Party	Candidate	Votes	%	±%
Green	Melanie Eastwood	1,585	43.4%	+4.5%
Labour	Richard Mark Mckenzie	1,213	33.2%	+6.4%
Conservative	Wazir Hussain	732	20.0%	+2.6%
Liberal Democrats	Hoyte Paul Arnoud Swager	123	3.4%	−13.5%
Majority		372	10.2%	
Turnout		3653	48%	
Green gain from Conservative		Swing	-1.0%	

Peppard Ward
Party	Candidate	Votes	%	±%
Conservative	Richard James Willis	2,109	57.9%	+4.7%
Labour	David Lawrence Absolom	671	18.4%	+3.2%
Liberal Democrats	Madeleine Elizabeth Adams	523	14.4%	−11.0%
Green	Kate Day	340	9.3%	+6.4%
Majority		1,438	39.5%	
Turnout		3643	49%	
Conservative hold		Swing	+0.8%	

Redlands Ward
Party	Candidate	Votes	%	±%
Labour	Jan Gavin	1,295	44.3%	+18.3%
Liberal Democrats	Kirsten Ruth Bayes	757	25.9%	−18.1%
Conservative	Ed Hopper	526	18.0%	−5.7%
Green	Mark Adrian Walker	345	11.8%	+5.6%
Majority		538	18.4%	
Turnout		2923	39%	
Labour gain from Liberal Democrats		Swing	+18.2%	

Southcote Ward
Party	Candidate	Votes	%	±%
Labour	Peter Martin Ruhemann	1,543	56.1%	+10.7%
Conservative	Robert Douglas Vickers	858	31.2%	−5.0%
Liberal Democrats	David Robert Warren	193	7.0%	−8.7%
Green	James Eric Towell	157	5.7%	+3.0%
Majority		685	24.9%	
Turnout		2751	43%	
Labour hold		Swing	+7.9%	

Thames Ward
Party	Candidate	Votes	%	±%
Conservative	Jeanette Mavis Skeats	2,139	54.6%	+3.0%
Labour	Duncan Quay Bruce	821	20.9%	+4.2%
Liberal Democrats	Guy Penman	522	13.3%	−13.6%
Green	Danny Mcnamara	439	11.2%	+6.4%
Majority		1318	33.7%	
Turnout		3921	54%	
Conservative hold		Swing	-0.6%	

Tilehurst Ward
Party	Candidate	Votes	%	±%
Conservative	Sandra Doreen Vickers	1,146	37.7%	+3.1%
Liberal Democrats	Christopher John Harris	957	31.5%	−8.5%
Labour	Rose Williams	774	25.5%	+7.6%
Green	Doug Cresswell	159	5.2%	+2.9%
Majority		189	6.2%	
Turnout		3036	43%	
Conservative gain from Liberal Democrats		Swing	+5.8%	

Whitley Ward
Party	Candidate	Votes	%	±%
Labour	Kelly Liza Edwards	1,331	56.9%	+8.5%
Conservative	Michael Charles Doyle	572	24.5%	−7.5%
Common Sense Party	Howard Thomas	207	8.9%	N/A
Liberal Democrats	Jamie Steven Wake	140	6.0%	−10.3%
Green	Keith Martin Johnson	88	3.8%	+0.5%
Majority		759	32.4%	
Turnout		2338	30%	
Labour hold		Swing	+8.0%	
