= 1986 Reading Borough Council election =

← 1984	8 May 1986	1987 →

15 seats of 45 on council 23 seats needed for a majority
	First party	Second party	Third party
	Lab	Con	Lib
Leader	Mike Orton	Deryck Morton	Jim Day
Party	Labour	Conservative	Liberal
Alliance			Alliance
Seats before	17	23	5
Seats after	22	18	5
Seat change	▲5	▼5	Steady
Popular vote	15,213	13,736	11,920
Percentage	36.4%	32.8%	28.5%
Swing	▲2.9%	▼9.6%	▲5.3%

The 1986 Reading Borough Council election was held on 8 May 1986, at the same time as other local elections across England and Scotland. One third of Reading Borough Council's 45 seats were up for election.

The election saw the Conservatives lose their majority on the council. Labour gained most seats, but remained one seat short of an overall majority, leaving the council with no overall control. After the election, Labour had 22 seats, the Conservatives had 18 seats, and the SDP-Liberal Alliance had 5 seats, all of whom were Liberals.

Labour subsequently took control of the council, with the support of two disaffected Conservatives. The Labour leader, Mike Orton, took the council's top political job as chair of the policy committee. The Conservative leader, Deryck Morton, stood down as party leader immediately after the election, being replaced by Geoff Canning. The Liberal leader remained Jim Day. Turnout was reported to be 39%.

== Results ==
Reading Borough Council Election, 1986
Party	Seats	Gains	Losses	Net gain/loss	Seats %	Votes %	Votes	+/−
Labour	9	5	0	+5	60.0	36.4	15,213	+2.9
Conservative	4	0	5	-5	26.7	32.8	13,736	-9.6
Alliance	2	1	1	0	13.3	28.5	11,920	+5.3
Green	0				0.0	2.3	954	+1.4

=== Ward results ===
The results in each ward were as follows (candidates with an asterisk* were the previous incumbent standing for re-election, candidates with a dagger(†) were sitting councillors contesting different wards):

Abbey Ward
Party	Candidate	Votes	%	±%
Labour	Dave Geary*	1,258	54.8	−2.9
Conservative	Chris Webb	476	20.7	−7.4
SDP	Jeremy Lazenby	404	17.6	+3.5
Green	Peter Oldham	156	6.8	n/a
Turnout		2,294		
Labour hold		Swing	+2.25	

Battle Ward
Party	Candidate	Votes	%	±%
Labour	Graham Rush*	1,292	51.4	+8.1
SDP	Clive Jones	597	23.7	−10.5
Conservative	Susan White	512	20.4	+0.3
Green	Ian Cooper	114	4.5	+2.2
Turnout		2,515		
Labour hold		Swing	+9.3	

Caversham Ward
Party	Candidate	Votes	%	±%
Conservative	Fred Pugh*	1,624	54.7	−10.0
Labour	Geoff Mander	803	27.1	+2.6
SDP	Mary Hargreaves	541	18.2	+7.4
Turnout		2,968		
Conservative hold		Swing	-6.3	

Church Ward
Party	Candidate	Votes	%	±%
Labour	June Orton*	1,077	51.3	+2.1
Conservative	Jennifer Abbott	569	27.1	−8.3
Liberal	Steve Begg	452	21.5	+6.2
Turnout		2,098		
Labour hold		Swing	+5.2	

Katesgrove Ward
Party	Candidate	Votes	%	±%
Labour	Mark Hendry	1,184	56.5	+5.7
Conservative	Shirley Mills*	620	29.6	−3.9
SDP	Nikola Sergt	292	13.9	+0.8
Turnout		2,096		
Labour gain from Conservative		Swing	+4.8	

Kentwood Ward
Party	Candidate	Votes	%	±%
Liberal	George Ford	1,227	43.7	+7.3
Conservative	Derek Browne*	865	30.8	−9.1
Labour	Linda Harper	714	25.4	+1.8
Turnout		2,806		
Liberal gain from Conservative		Swing	+8.2	

Minster Ward
Party	Candidate	Votes	%	±%
Conservative	Charles Sage*	1,218	42.1	−12.6
Labour	Brian Statter	1,014	35.0	+5.0
SDP	Steve Hanson	566	19.6	+4.2
Green	Andrew Hardy	97	3.4	n/a
Turnout		2,895		
Conservative hold		Swing	-8.8	

Norcot Ward
Party	Candidate	Votes	%	±%
Labour	Jo Lovelock	1,373	43.9	+3.0
Liberal	John Freeman*	1,168	37.3	−2.9
Conservative	Peter Wells	518	16.5	−2.4
Green	Maureen Gray	71	2.3	n/a
Turnout		3,130		
Labour gain from Liberal		Swing	+2.95	

Park Ward
Party	Candidate	Votes	%	±%
Labour	Gill Parker	1,530	51.4	+7.2
Conservative	Norman Pearson*	921	30.9	−7.6
SDP	Robin Pratt	359	12.1	−1.4
Green	Philip Unsworth	167	5.6	+1.8
Turnout		2,977		
Labour gain from Conservative		Swing	7.4	

Peppard Ward
Party	Candidate	Votes	%	±%
Conservative	Geoff Canning*	1,479	44.5	−18.1
Liberal	Ian Fenwick	1,452	43.6	+19.5
Labour	Phil Hingley	396	11.9	−1.4
Turnout		3,327		
Conservative hold		Swing	-18.8	

Redlands Ward
Party	Candidate	Votes	%	±%
Labour	Rajinder Sohpal	1,105	34.1	−3.2
SDP	David Cornes	1,043	32.2	+7.9
Conservative	Grace Wray	912	28.1	−6.0
Green	Chris Parr	181	5.6	+1.3
Turnout		3,241		
Labour gain from Conservative		Swing	+4.6	

Southcote Ward
Party	Candidate	Votes	%	±%
Labour	Christine Howell	1,430	44.0	+10.7
Conservative	John Rimmer	1,187	36.5	−9.2
SDP	Andrew McLuskey	632	19.5	−1.5
Turnout		3,249		
Labour gain from Conservative		Swing	+9.95	

Thames Ward
Party	Candidate	Votes	%	±%
Conservative	Hamza Fuad*	1,435	40.6	−19.7
Liberal	Martyn Allies	1,248	35.3	+7.7
Conservative	Tony Markham†	381	10.8	n/a
Labour	Mark Drukker	306	8.6	−3.5
Green	Louise Barnes	168	4.7	n/a
Turnout		3,538		
Conservative hold		Swing	-13.7	

Tilehurst Ward
Party	Candidate	Votes	%	±%
Liberal	Janet Bond*	1,614	59.5	+4.4
Conservative	David Henderson	655	24.1	−8.4
Labour	Jim Toner	445	16.4	+4.1
Turnout		2,714		
Liberal hold		Swing	+6.4	

Whitley Ward
Party	Candidate	Votes	%	±%
Labour	Mike Orton*	1,286	65.1	+13.1
Conservative	Barry Cummings	364	18.4	−6.7
SDP	John Wood	325	16.5	−6.5
Turnout		1,975		
Labour hold		Swing	+9.9	

== By-elections 1986–1987 ==
Peppard By-Election 11 September 1986
Party	Candidate	Votes	%	±%
Liberal	Ian Fenwick	1,564	46.6	+2.9
Conservative	Frank Heyes	1,408	41.9	−2.5
Labour	Phil Hingley	385	11.5	−0.4
Majority		156	4.6	
Turnout		3,357	45.2	
Liberal gain from Conservative		Swing	+2.7	

The Peppard ward by-election in 1986 was triggered by the resignation of Conservative councillor Geoff Lowe.
