= Reading East =

UK Parliament constituency (1983–2024)

Coordinates: 51.46°N 0.95°W

- Former borough constituency for the House of Commons
- Boundary of Reading East in Berkshire

- Location of Berkshire within England
- County: Berkshire
- Electorate: 72,647 (2018)
- Major settlements: Reading

1983–2024
- Seats: One
- Created from: Reading North, Reading South and Henley
- Replaced by: Earley and Woodley, Reading Central

Reading East was a constituency (Note: A borough constituency (for the purposes of election expenses and type of returning officer)) represented in the House of Commons of the UK Parliament. (Note: As with all constituencies, the constituency elects one Member of Parliament (MP) by the first past the post system of election at least every five years.) In the 2019–2024 Parliament, it was one of two Labour seats from a total of eight seats in Berkshire.

Further to the completion of the 2023 Periodic Review of Westminster constituencies, the seat was abolished. The area was transferred to the new constituencies of Earley and Woodley (Bulmershe and Whitegates, Church, Loddon and South Lake wards) and Reading Central (all other wards). These constituencies were first contested at the 2024 general election.

== Constituency profile ==
The seat contained the University of Reading and most of its students. The Thames Valley Business Park is in another part of the seat, hosting multinational and cutting-edge technology companies in the software and advanced computer science areas. Adjoining the redeveloped heart of town are a handful mid-rise blocks of ex-council flats and serried ranks of former relatively philanthropic biscuit, brick and seeds manufacturing/processing workers' neat terraces towards the south-centre and east of the town, including firmly Labour-held wards. The suburban north bank of the Thames section takes in Caversham, forming four wards, whilst Earley and Woodley, adding a further three wards, make up strongly leaning Conservative wards. Intermediate wards such as Redlands and Park are more marginal including Green Party and Liberal Democrat representation.

== History ==
The Reading East parliamentary constituency was first contested in 1983, when it was won by a partial incumbent, Gerry Vaughan, a Conservative who was before that election sitting MP for abolished Reading South. He held the seat through two general elections until he retired before the 1997 election. The constituency was won in 1997 by the Labour Party's Jane Griffiths, thus a backbencher under the Blair Ministry. She retained the seat in the 2001 election but was deselected by her Constituency Labour Party before the 2005 election, when the seat was won by the Tory candidate, Rob Wilson, who held the seat through two elections. Until 2005 the seat had been a national bellwether.

Graph of election results for Reading East, 1983-2017

The seat was regained by the Labour Party's candidate in 2017, Matt Rodda, achieving the party's best showing since the seat's creation. Rodda's 2017 win was one of 30 net gains of the Labour Party. The 2017 result came when there was a hung parliament nationally. Reading East was one of five constituencies, the others being Croydon Central, Enfield Southgate, Leeds North West and Peterborough, which elected Labour MPs in 2017 having not done so since 2001.

At the 2019 general election, the seat was retained by Rodda with an increased majority, achieving a swing to Labour of 1.9%, and bucking the national trend which saw an overall swing to the Conservatives of 4.6%.

The seat has been, relative to others, a semi-marginal seat, and major-swing (volatile) seat since 2010. Its winner's majority has not exceeded 12.9% of the vote since the 15.2% majority won in that year. The seat has changed hands once since 2010.

== Boundaries and boundary changes ==
=== 1983–1997 ===
- The Borough of Reading wards of Abbey, Caversham, Church, Park, Peppard, Redlands, Thames, and Whitley; and
- The District of Wokingham wards of Arborfield, Barkham, Finchampstead, Shinfield, and Swallowfield.

Formed as a county constituency, largely from parts of the abolished constituency of Reading South. It also incorporated parts of the abolished constituency of Reading North, including Caversham.

=== 1997–2010 ===
- The Borough of Reading wards of Abbey, Caversham, Church, Katesgrove, Park, Peppard, Redlands, and Thames;and
- The District of Wokingham wards of Bulmershe, Loddon, South Lake, and Whitegates.

For the 1997 general election, the constituency lost its southern areas comprising the parts of the District of Wokingham to Wokingham (including Shinfield) and Bracknell (Finchampstead), but gained other parts of Wokingham to the east of the Reading. The boundary with Reading West was realigned, gaining Katesgrove ward and losing Whitley ward. It was redesignated as a Borough Constituency.

=== 2010–2024 ===
Map of boundaries 2010-2024

- The Borough of Reading wards of Abbey, Caversham, Church, Katesgrove, Mapledurham, Park, Peppard, Redlands, and Thames; and
- The District of Wokingham wards of Bulmershe and Whitegates, Loddon, and South Lake.

Marginal changes due to revision of local authority wards.

Reading East was bordered by the constituencies of Reading West, Henley, Maidenhead, and Wokingham.

== Members of Parliament ==
Election	Member	Party
1983	Gerard Vaughan	Conservative
1997	Jane Griffiths	Labour
2005	Rob Wilson	Conservative
2017	Matt Rodda	Labour

== Elections ==
=== Elections in the 2010s ===
General election 2019: Reading East
Party	Candidate	Votes	%	±%
Labour	Matt Rodda	27,102	48.5	−0.5
Conservative	Craig Morley	21,178	37.9	−4.4
Liberal Democrats	Imogen Shepherd-DuBey	5,035	9.0	+2.9
Green	David McElroy	1,549	2.8	+0.8
Brexit Party	Mitch Feierstein	852	1.5	New
CPA	Yemi Awolola	202	0.4	New
Majority		5,924	10.6	+3.8
Turnout		55,918	72.6	−0.7
Registered electors		77,152		
Labour hold		Swing	+1.9	

General election 2017: Reading East
Party	Candidate	Votes	%	±%
Labour	Matt Rodda	27,093	49.0	+16.0
Conservative	Rob Wilson	23,344	42.3	−3.7
Liberal Democrats	Jenny Woods	3,378	6.1	−1.2
Green	Kizzi Johannessen	1,093	2.0	−4.4
Independent	Michael Turberville	188	0.3	New
Movement for Active Democracy	Andy Kirkwood	142	0.3	New
Majority		3,749	6.8	N/A
Turnout		55,370	73.1	+5.5
Registered electors		75,522		
Labour gain from Conservative		Swing	+9.9	

General election 2015: Reading East
Party	Candidate	Votes	%	±%
Conservative	Rob Wilson	23,217	46.0	+3.4
Labour	Matt Rodda	16,697	33.1	+7.6
Liberal Democrats	Jenny Woods	3,719	7.4	−20.0
UKIP	Christine Forrester	3,647	7.2	+5.1
Green	Rob White	3,214	6.4	+4.2
Majority		6,520	12.9	–2.3
Turnout		50,494	69.2	+2.3
Registered electors		74,651		
Conservative hold		Swing	−2.1	

General election 2010: Reading East
Party	Candidate	Votes	%	±%
Conservative	Rob Wilson	21,269	42.6	+6.9
Liberal Democrats	Gareth Epps	13,664	27.3	+3.0
Labour	Anneliese Dodds	12,729	25.5	−8.4
UKIP	Adrian Pitfield	1,086	2.2	+0.2
Green	Rob White	1,069	2.1	−1.4
Independent	Joan Lloyd	111	0.2	New
Independent	Michael Turberville	57	0.1	New
Majority		7,605	15.3	+13.4
Turnout		49,985	66.7	+6.4
Registered electors		74,922		
Conservative hold		Swing	+2.0	

=== Elections in the 2000s ===
2005 notional result
Party	Vote	%
Conservative	15,381	35.7
Labour	14,595	33.8
Liberal Democrats	10,508	24.4
Others	2,652	6.1
Turnout	43,136	60.3
Electorate	71,480	

General election 2005: Reading East
Party	Candidate	Votes	%	±%
Conservative	Rob Wilson	15,557	35.4	+3.5
Labour	Tony Page	15,082	34.3	−10.4
Liberal Democrats	John Howson	10,619	24.2	+5.7
Green	Rob White	1,548	3.5	+1.1
UKIP	David Lamb	849	1.9	+0.7
Independent	Joan Lloyd	135	0.3	New
Independent	Rex Hora	122	0.3	New
Majority		475	1.1	N/A
Turnout		43,912	60.3	+1.9
Registered electors		72,806		
Conservative gain from Labour		Swing	+7.0	

General election 2001: Reading East
Party	Candidate	Votes	%	±%
Labour	Jane Griffiths	19,538	44.8	+2.1
Conservative	Barry Tanswell	13,943	32.0	−3.2
Liberal Democrats	Thomas Dobrashian	8,078	18.5	–0.0
Green	Miriam Kennet	1,053	2.4	New
UKIP	Amy Thornton	525	1.2	+0.7
Socialist Alliance	Darren Williams	394	0.9	New
Independent	Peter Hammerson	94	0.2	New
Majority		5,595	12.8	+5.3
Turnout		43,625	58.4	−11.7
Registered electors		74,637		
Labour hold		Swing	+2.6	

=== Elections in the 1990s ===
General election 1997: Reading East
Party	Candidate	Votes	%	±%
Labour	Jane Griffiths	21,461	42.7	+13.8
Conservative	John Watts	17,666	35.2	−13.9
Liberal Democrats	Sam Samuel	9,307	18.5	−1.9
Referendum	David Harmer	1,042	2.1	New
Natural Law	John Buckley	254	0.5	New
UKIP	Amy Thornton	252	0.5	New
BNP	Barbara Packer	238	0.5	New
Majority		3,795	7.6	N/A
Turnout		50,220	70.2	−4.8
Registered electors		71,586		
Labour gain from Conservative		Swing	+13.9	

1992 notional result
Party	Vote	%
Conservative	25,699	49.1
Labour	15,115	28.9
Liberal Democrats	10,684	20.4
Others	814	1.6
Turnout	52,312	74.9
Electorate	69,817	

General election 1992: Reading East
Party	Candidate	Votes	%	±%
Conservative	Gerard Vaughan	29,148	53.8	+0.0
Labour	Gillian Parker	14,593	27.0	+5.5
Liberal Democrats	Denis Thair	9,528	17.6	−5.6
Green	A McCubbin	861	1.6	+0.3
Majority		14,555	26.8	−3.7
Turnout		54,130	75.0	+1.8
Registered electors		72,151		
Conservative hold		Swing	−2.7	

=== Elections in the 1980s ===
General election 1987: Reading East
Party	Candidate	Votes	%	±%
Conservative	Gerard Vaughan	28,515	53.8	+2.2
SDP	Susan Baring	12,298	23.2	−4.2
Labour	Martin Salter	11,371	21.5	+2.1
Green	Philip Unsworth	667	1.3	+0.2
CSOSMG	Arthur Shone	125	0.2	–0.1
Majority		16,217	30.6	+6.4
Turnout		52,976	73.3	+2.9
Registered electors		72,311		
Conservative hold		Swing	+3.2	

General election 1983: Reading East
Party	Candidate	Votes	%	±%
Conservative	Gerard Vaughan	24,516	51.6	–3.0
SDP	Chris Huhne	13,008	27.4	+11.6
Labour	Kevin Boyle	9,218	19.4	–9.1
Ecology	Geoffrey Darnton	519	1.1	
BNP	P. Baker	147	0.3	
Common Market Party	Arthur Shone	113	0.2	New
Majority		11,508	24.2	–1.8
Turnout		47,512	70.4	
Registered electors		67,511		
Conservative hold		Swing	–7.3	

1979 notional result
Party	Vote	%
Conservative	26,746	54.6
Labour	13,969	28.5
Liberal	7,749	15.8
Others	560	1.1
Turnout	49,024	
Electorate		

== See also ==
- List of parliamentary constituencies in Berkshire
