= Rob Wilson =

English politician and political author

Robert Wilson
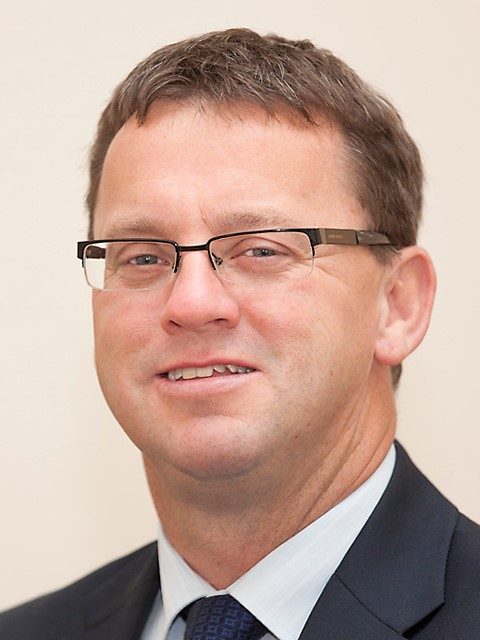

Parliamentary Under-Secretary of State for Civil Society
- In office 27 September 2014 – 9 June 2017
- Prime Minister: David Cameron; Theresa May
- Preceded by: Brooks Newmark
- Succeeded by: The Lord Ashton of Hyde

Member of Parliament for Reading East
- In office 5 May 2005 – 3 May 2017
- Preceded by: Jane Griffiths
- Succeeded by: Matt Rodda

Personal details
- Born: 4 January 1965 (age 61) Wallingford, England
- Party: SDP (until 1988) 'Continuing' SDP (1988–90); Conservative (since 1990)
- Education: University of Reading
- Website: Official website

Robert Owen Biggs Wilson (born 4 January 1965) is an English politician and political author. He was elected Conservative Member of Parliament for the Reading East parliamentary constituency in the 2005 general election, being re-elected in the elections of 2010 and 2015, before being defeated in 2017. He became Minister for Civil Society in the Cabinet Office on 27 September 2014.

== Early life ==
Wilson was born and brought up in south Oxfordshire. He attended Wallingford School and then, between 1984 and 1988, the University of Reading, where he studied history. He spent his final year at university as the President of the Reading University Students' Union. At that time, Wilson was a member of the Social Democratic Party (SDP), but when it merged with the Liberals to form the Liberal Democrats in 1988 he declined to follow, instead joining David Owen's 'continuing' SDP. He stood for the 'continuing' SDP (with Liberal Democrat opposition) in Redlands ward at the 1988 Reading Borough Council election.

== Politics ==
=== Local government ===
Following the demise of the 'continuing' SDP in 1990, Wilson joined the Conservative Party. In 1992 he was one of twenty ex-Owenite SDP members to publicly endorse the Conservatives prior to the general election, and later that year he was elected as one of three councillors for the Thames ward of Reading Borough Council, serving one term (until 1996). In 1997, he unsuccessfully contested Bolton North East at that year's general election.

In 2003 he was elected for the Caversham ward of Reading Borough Council, in a by-election for a one-year term. The following year, he was again elected a councillor for Thames ward. Following his election as Member of Parliament, he stood down from the Council in May 2006.

=== MP in the 2005–2010 parliament ===
Wilson was selected as the Conservative parliamentary candidate for Reading East using a pioneering primary system, which opened the selection to non-party members for the first time. At the 2005 General Election he faced the Labour candidate and councillor, Tony Page. Page had replaced sitting MP, Labour's Jane Griffiths, who had been de-selected by her party. Wilson won 15,557 votes (35.4%) against Page's 15,082 votes (34.3%). The Conservative share of the vote increased by 3.4%.

After his election, Wilson made his maiden speech on 23 May 2005. He served on the Education and Skills Select Committee, selected by the committee chair. Here he played a role in the committee stage of the Education and Inspections Bill, on issues such as Special Educational Needs. In July 2007 Wilson was promoted to the Conservative frontbench as Shadow Higher Education Minister replacing Boris Johnson.

The MP, during his terms of office, promoted a major anti knife-crime campaign of Reading's papers; to do so meeting with crime victims' families and Thames Valley Police. Wilson successfully lobbied the DfT, Network Rail and local council to secure funding for the expansion and increase in facilities at Reading railway station – associated with investment into high rise and mid rise offices, retail and hotels in Reading. He jointly with former Labour MP Martin Salter successfully lobbied for the extension of Crossrail services to and from Reading, providing direct trains to much of Central London, and western parts of Essex and Kent.

=== MP in the 2010–2015 parliament ===
On 6 May 2010, Wilson was re-elected by the people of Reading East with a majority of 15.2% of those who voted and 42.6% of the vote. In the resulting Conservative and Liberal Democrat coalition government from May 2010, the Liberal Democrats shared in ministerial positions. Wilson was among Shadow Ministers in the previous Parliament that were not offered a position as a Minister in coalition. In 2010 he was appointed Parliamentary Private Secretary to the Secretary of State for Culture, Media and Sport, Jeremy Hunt MP.

In July 2014 the MP stated that he would have accepted an undisclosed ministerial position but wished to use his spare time to publish a book on the scandals involving former MP Chris Huhne (who perverted the course of justice by lying about driving too fast to keep his driving licence) and the Chief Whip's plebgate incident each of which meant they lost their ministerial positions. He had earlier been offered a position as a junior government whip but refused this as still writing the same book. Critics, unnamed in a BBC interview with Wilson, attributed his decision to decline a promotion to their perception that the Conservative Party was likely to lose both of its Reading seats and said that in writing this sort of polemic, the government may prefer not to promote Wilson.

The Prime Minister's office appointed Wilson to the government as a minister on 27 September 2014, following the resignation of Brooks Newmark following allegations in Daily Mirror that Newmark had sent sexually explicit images to an undercover reporter He became the Minister for Civil Society which entails charities, volunteering and social enterprise, which he accepted a month after finishing the book, which he assessed as incompatible with being in a senior government or opposition role.

=== MP in the 2015–2017 parliament ===
On 8 May 2015, Wilson was again re-elected by the people of Reading East, with 23,217 votes and a majority of 6,520, compared to 7,605 in 2010. Shortly after retaining his seat in the 2015 general election, Wilson sparked controversy with a remark on Twitter in which he seemed to show a lack of interest in solving his constituency's rising homelessness problem. When asked about how his party's cuts would help solve it, he responded with "Don't be a bad loser." This sparked considerable outrage online, including a petition on 38 Degrees for him to be removed from office.

In July 2015, he was forced to defend his claims for travel expenses, which included 9p for a 352-yard car journey to a constituency event and 60p for a journey on his bicycle between his constituency office, the railway station and home. He said that putting such small costs on expenses might seem "odd", but said that over a year mileage "does add up". He pointed out he had not claimed any accommodation expenses in London since becoming an MP in 2005, saving taxpayers "hundreds of thousands of pounds. However, as I do commute most days it does mean I incur parking and mileage expenses instead".

In the run-up to the EU referendum of 2016, Wilson publicly indicated that he believed the UK should remain a member of the European Union whilst not actively campaigning for it since he believed that he should stay neutral. In 2017 he voted to trigger article 50.

=== Defeat in the June 2017 election ===
On 8 June 2017, Wilson was defeated in the general election called by Theresa May in an unsuccessful attempt to increase her majority prior to the negotiations over the exit from the European Union. He received 23,344 votes, but came second to Matt Rodda, standing for the Labour Party, with 27,093 votes, a majority of 3,759.

== Subsequent career ==
Wilson joined the board of the Consumer Council for Water as an independent board member in July 2018. In June 2024, he was appointed, by Defra and the Welsh Government, as the chair of that body. He also chairs WheelPower, a disability sports charity, is deputy chair of the Social Mobility Commission, and is a non-executive board member of the Marine Management Organisation.

Wilson writes on politics for publications including The Daily Telegraph, and The Times. He has published two books, 5 Days to Power, and Eye of the Storm.

Parliament of the United Kingdom
Preceded by Jane Griffiths	Member of Parliament for Reading East; 2005–2017	Succeeded by Matt Rodda
