= Gerard Vaughan (British politician) =

Sir Gerard Folliott Vaughan

Minister of State for Consumer Affairs
- In office 5 March 1982 – 13 June 1983
- Prime Minister: Margaret Thatcher
- Preceded by: Sally Oppenheim-Barnes
- Succeeded by: Office abolished

Minister of State, Health and Social Security
- In office 7 May 1979 – 5 March 1982
- Prime Minister: Margaret Thatcher
- Preceded by: Roland Moyle
- Succeeded by: Kenneth Clarke

Member of Parliament
- In office 18 June 1970 – 8 April 1997
- Preceded by: John Lee
- Succeeded by: Jane Griffiths
- Constituency: Reading (1970–1974); Reading South (1974–1983); Reading East (1983–1997)

Personal details
- Born: Gerard Folliott Vaughan; 11 June 1923
- Died: 29 July 2003 (aged 80)
- Party: Conservative
- Spouse(s): Thurle Joyce Laver, Lady Folliott Vaughan (m. 1955)
- Children: 2
- Education: University of London
- Occupation: Psychiatrist

Sir Gerard Folliott Vaughan (11 June 1923 – 29 July 2003) was a British psychiatrist and politician, who reached ministerial rank during the Thatcher administration. He represented a series of constituencies in Reading from 1970 to 1997.

Vaughan's political career ended after a battle with the Campaign for Nuclear Disarmament's Joan Ruddock over the government's grant to the Citizens Advice Bureau. He lost his government post and was no longer active in politics from that point on.

== Early life ==
Gerard Folliott Vaughan was the son of a sugar planter, born and educated in what is now Mozambique. During the Second World War, his father joined the Royal Air Force as a pilot, and was killed.

== Medical career ==
Vaughan studied medicine in London, attending the University of London, Guy's Hospital, and the Maudsley Hospital. He eventually became the consultant in charge of the Bloomfield Clinic at Guy's Hospital, serving in that role from 1958 to 1979.

== Politics ==
Vaughan became involved in Conservative Party politics in the mid-1950s, serving as an alderman on the London County Council. He stood unsuccessfully in 1964 to represent Lambeth on the Greater London Council and stood successfully in Lambeth at the 1967 election. In 1970 he was elected by the council as an alderman for a term ending in 1976. He resigned on 18 September 1972.

He stood for the constituency of Poplar in East London in the general election of 1955 but was defeated. In the general election of 1970, he won the Reading constituency from Labour. Thereafter, he represented the constituencies of Reading South and Reading East until his retirement from politics before the general election of 1997.

During the government of Edward Heath, Vaughan served as a government whip and as Parliamentary Private Secretary to Francis Pym, the Secretary of State for Northern Ireland. When Margaret Thatcher became leader of the Conservative Party, after Heath's defeat in the general elections of February 1974 and October 1974, Vaughan became her health spokesman. He became a minister in the Department of Health and Social Security under Patrick Jenkin after the Conservative Party won the general election in 1979.

Vaughan did not get on with his new boss, Norman Fowler, who replaced Jenkin in 1981. In 1982, Vaughan was transferred to become consumer affairs minister. When he discovered that the then chair of the Campaign for Nuclear Disarmament, Joan Ruddock, was also head of his local Citizen's Advice Bureau (CAB), he threatened to halve the government's contribution to CABs across the country. The uproar that followed, both from the thousands of voluntary workers in the CAB and from their Conservative MPs, forced Vaughan to retreat during an angry Commons debate in April 1983.

Vaughan was dropped from the government in 1983 and given a knighthood in 1984. From the back benches, he served on the Education Select Committee from 1983 to 1993, and the Science and Technology Select Committee from 1993 to 1997. In his Reading constituency, he fought against plans, sponsored by Nicholas Ridley, to build housing in Berkshire's diminishing green belt. Vaughan was a freemason.

== Sources ==
- Tim Bullamore (2003). "Obituary - Sir Gerard Vaughan". British Medical Journal. 327 (7412): 452. doi:10.1136/bmj.327.7412.452. PMC 188520.
- Roth, Andrew (5 August 2003). "Obituary - Sir Gerard Vaughan". Guardian Unlimited.

Parliament of the United Kingdom
Preceded by John Lee	Member of Parliament for Reading; 1970–1974	Constituency abolished
New constituency	Member of Parliament for Reading South; 1974–1983	Constituency abolished
New constituency	Member of Parliament for Reading East; 1983–1997	Succeeded by Jane Griffiths
