= Jane Griffiths (politician) =

British linguist and politician

Member of Parliament for Reading East
- In office 1 May 1997 – 11 April 2005
- Preceded by: Gerard Vaughan
- Succeeded by: Rob Wilson

Personal details
- Born: 17 April 1954 (age 72)
- Party: Labour
- Spouse: Andrew Tattersall
- Education: University of Durham
- Profession: Politician
- Website: Jane Griffiths' blog

Jane Patricia Griffiths (born 17 April 1954) is a British linguist and politician. She was elected as the Labour Member of Parliament (MP) for the Reading East parliamentary constituency at the 1997 general election. In 2004, Griffiths was deselected as the Labour candidate for Reading East by her local party. Consequently, she did not stand for re-election.

== Early life ==
Attending Cedars Grammar School in Leighton Buzzard, Griffiths later studied at the University of Durham, gaining a degree in Russian. From 1977 to 1985, she was a linguist at Government Communications Headquarters (GCHQ), and from 1984 to 1997 the Asia editor for BBC Monitoring. At one stage, she was also an English teacher.

== Politics ==
Griffiths' political career began in 1989 when she was elected to Reading Borough Council. She sat on the council, as a Labour member, until 1999.

Prior to the 1997 general election, Griffiths was selected as the Labour Prospective Parliamentary Candidate (PPC) for the Reading East constituency. This had been a safe Conservative seat since its creation in 1983. The retiring Tory incumbent Gerard Vaughan had a majority of 14,555. Despite this, Griffiths emerged as one of the surprise winners of the general election.

In Parliament, she established a reputation as a fervent pro-European. Andrew Roth of The Guardian described her as a "pro-EU partisan loyalist with an international outlook". As a backbench Labour MP, she was largely supportive of the Tony Blair administration. Griffiths acquired a reputation for being somewhat confrontational, voicing disagreement with Speaker Betty Boothroyd. Notably, she also called for legalized brothels.

At the 2001 general election, Griffiths increased her majority from 3,795 to 5,588. However, her disputes with her local party became much more public thereafter. In early 2002, she wrote in The Sunday Times about rampant sexism within the Parliamentary Labour Party. Subsequently, she alleged she was experiencing bullying by local Labour Party activists in Reading. This was denied by the local Party Chair. The ensuing tensions culminated in Griffiths' deselection as the candidate for the 2005 general election, a first for any MP in ten years. 'Personality issues' were cited, whilst Griffiths contended she was the victim of a conspiracy by '1970s men': her assertion was criticized as 'wild conspiracy theories' in an open letter by seventeen female members of the party. She vowed not to stand as an independent, and the seat was contested by local Labour councillor Tony Page who lost by a very narrow margin, with Griffiths being succeeded by Conservative Rob Wilson in 2005. In between her deselection and the end of her term, she fought off suggestions she would defect to the Conservatives.

== Bankruptcy and arrest ==
Four days after the 2005 general election Griffiths was declared bankrupt, owing £29,000 to the Inland Revenue. This would have disqualified her from retaking her seat in the House of Commons had she been reselected and reelected. She failed to appear at her bankruptcy hearing before Reading County Court on Monday 19 September 2005 and a warrant was subsequently issued for her arrest. After convincing the court she had the assets to pay her debts and would co-operate with the proceedings, the warrant was discharged. However, her discharge from bankruptcy was subsequently suspended on the grounds that she was not co-operating, stating that she was in Latvia. This was inaccurately reported in the local press as her being made bankrupt a second time.

== After politics ==
=== Blogs ===
During 2005-6 Griffiths wrote a political blog, called 'janestheone' after her election slogan in earlier days. On her blog, she described herself as a writer, linguist and political blogger and as being internationalist, anti-totalitarian and pro-democracy everywhere in the world. The blog was suspended following a complaint but she immediately started a new one. The new blog, like the old one, is devoted mainly to criticising Old Labour in general and Reading Labour Party in particular.

=== Book ===
In August 2008 she published a book entitled The One.

== Personal life ==
Griffiths is married to Andrew Tattersall, who previously worked as her assistant. She has two children from a previous marriage. She currently lives in Strasbourg.

She was well known in her constituency as a keen rat fancier and owner of several pet rats. She also initiated the unsuccessful campaign to return the fireless locomotive Huntley & Palmers No.1 to Reading.

Parliament of the United Kingdom
Preceded by Gerard Vaughan	Member of Parliament for Reading East; 1997–2005	Succeeded by Rob Wilson
