= Peter Swallow =

British politician (born 1993)

Peter Swallow MP
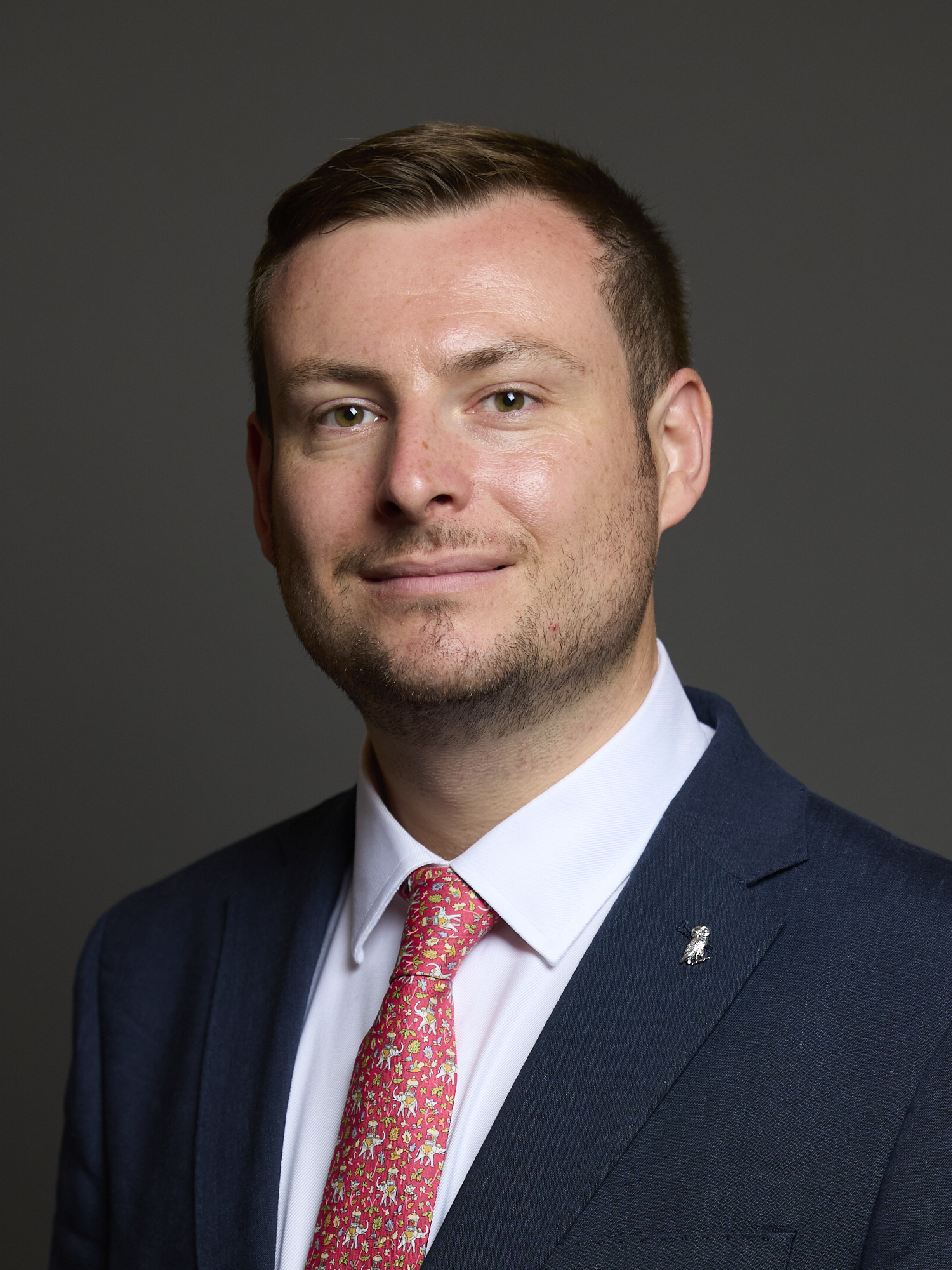
- Official portrait, 2024

Member of Parliament for Bracknell
- Incumbent
- Assumed office 4 July 2024
- Preceded by: James Sunderland
- Majority: 784 (1.8%)

Personal details
- Born: 1993 (age 32–33)
- Party: Labour
- Education: University of St Andrews (MA); St Hilda's College, Oxford (MSt); King's College London (PhD)

Peter Swallow (born 1993) is a British classicist, academic and politician who has served as the Member of Parliament (MP) for Bracknell since 2024. Before his election, he was a postdoctoral researcher specialising in the study of Aristotle. He is the first Labour Party MP for Bracknell.

== Early life and education ==
Swallow was born in Wokingham and grew up in Crowthorne. He studied classics at university, graduating with an undergraduate Master of Arts (MA Hons) degree from the University of St Andrews and a Master of Studies (MSt) degree from St Hilda's College, Oxford. He undertook a Doctor of Philosophy (PhD) degree at King's College London, which he completed in 2020 with a doctoral thesis titled "The reception of Aristophanes in Britain during the long-Nineteenth century".

He is the author of Aristophanes in Britain: Old Comedy in the Nineteenth Century (Oxford University Press, 2023). He co-edited Aristophanic Humour: Theory and Practice (Bloomsbury Academic, 2020) with Edith Hall.

Prior to entering politics, Swallow held a postdoctoral position as Nomikos Research Associate at King's College London.

According to Bracknell News, "Since 2017 he has worked with the Advocating Classics Education project, which expands access to classical education in schools. He is particularly interested in supporting greater provision for special education needs."

== Political career ==
At the 2024 general election, Swallow was elected as the Member of Parliament (MP) for Bracknell with 14,783 votes (33.7%) and a majority of 784. Bracknell had previously only ever elected Conservative Party MPs; Swallow defeated James Sunderland. On the floor of the House of Commons, Swallow made his maiden speech in July 2024, describing it as “the honour of my life."

Swallow currently serves on several joint and Commons committees. This includes the Human Rights (Joint Committee); the Court of Referees; and the Norwich Livestock Market Bill [House of Lords] Committee. Previously, he was a member of the Institute for Apprenticeships and Technical Education (Transfer of Functions etc) Bill [HL] Committee.

He currently chairs the All‑Party Parliamentary Group (APPG) on Classics and serves as Vice‑Chair of the APPG for the South East, reflecting his dual interests in heritage education and regional advocacy. He is also Chair of the APPGs on Schools, Learning and Assessment and Social Mobility.

In June 2025, he secured a House of Commons Adjournment Debate focused on street parking on residential estates in Bracknell Forest. During a debate on 16 June he was reprimanded by the Speaker for "pointing, shouting and bawling".

In the same month, Swallow voted in favour of the Terminally Ill Adults (End of Life) Bill, which proposes to legalise assisted suicide.

On 11 March 2026, Swallow was directed by the Speaker of the Commons to leave the chamber, during Prime Minister’s Questions, after his noisy and disruptive behaviour, with the Speaker also referring to his poor behaviour in previous weeks.

== Personal life ==
Swallow is a member of the LGBTQ+ community.

== Electoral history ==
General election 2024: Bracknell
Party	Candidate	Votes	%	±%
Labour	Peter Swallow	14,783	33.7	8.3
Conservative	James Sunderland	13,999	31.9	−23.6
Reform	Malcolm Tullett	7,445	17.0	New
Liberal Democrats	Katie Mansfield	4,768	10.9	−3.1
Green	Emily Torode	2,166	4.9	0.9
Independent	Olivio Barreto	480	1.1	−0.1
Heritage	Jason Reardon	196	0.4	New
Turnout		43,837	61%	
