= James Sunderland (politician) =

British Conservative politician

Colonel James Sunderland
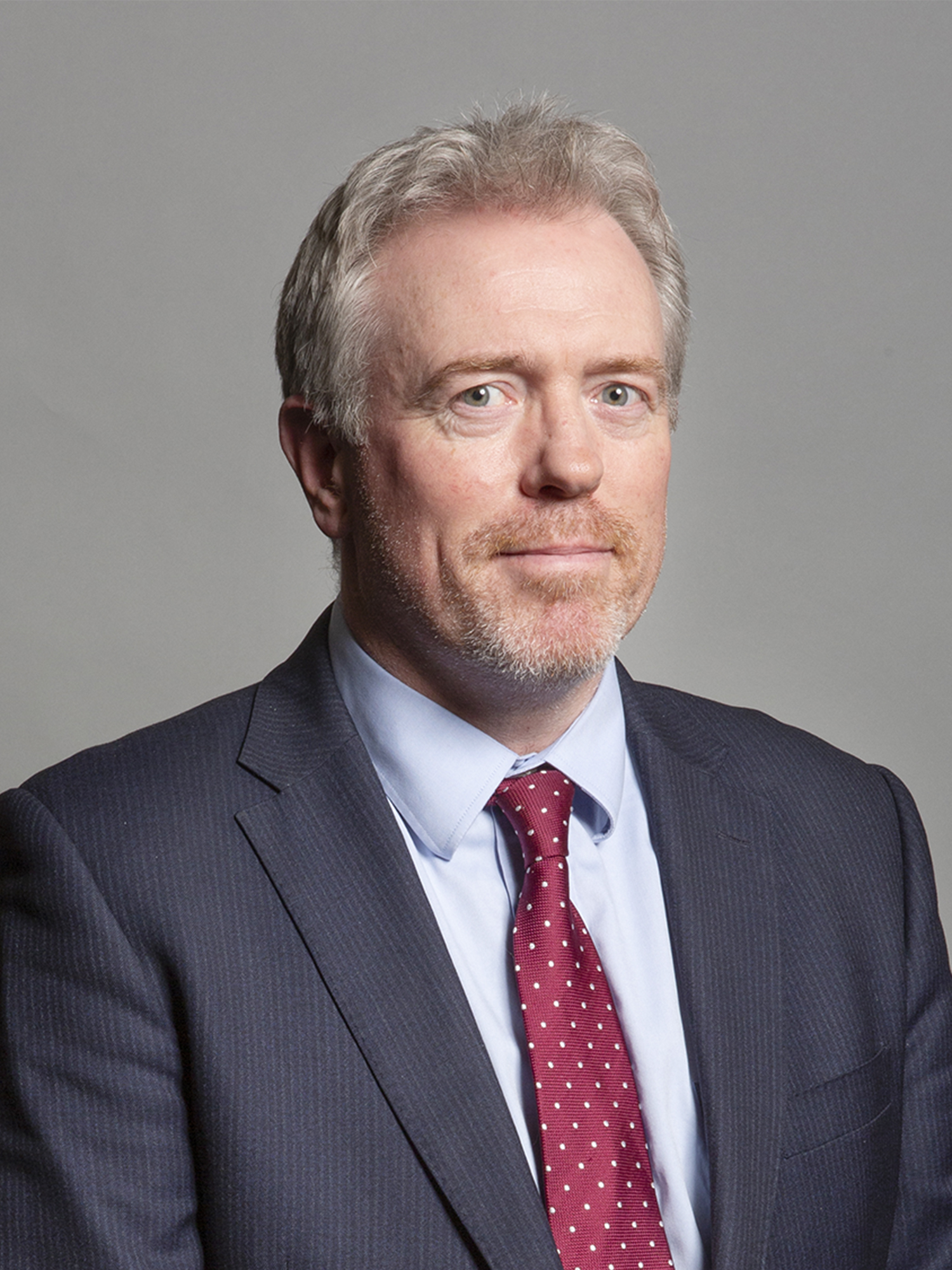
- Official portrait, 2019

Member of Parliament for Bracknell
- In office 12 December 2019 – 30 May 2024
- Preceded by: Phillip Lee
- Succeeded by: Peter Swallow

Personal details
- Born: 6 June 1970 (age 56) Chertsey, Surrey, England
- Party: Conservative
- Education: University of Birmingham (BA); Royal Military Academy at Sandhurst; King's College London (MA)
- Website: jamessunderland.org.uk

Military service
- Allegiance: United Kingdom
- Branch/service: British Army
- Years of service: 1993–2019
- Rank: Colonel
- Battles/wars: Iraq War; War in Afghanistan

James De Ville Sunderland (born 6 June 1970) is a British Conservative politician and former military officer who served as the Member of Parliament (MP) for Bracknell between 2019 and 2024.

== Early life and education ==
James Sunderland was born on 6 June 1970 in Chertsey. He was privately educated at Royal Grammar School Guildford, before earning a bachelor’s degree at the University of Birmingham. He later earned a master's degree from King’s College London before attending the Defence Academy.

== Military service ==
Sunderland was commissioned into the British Army from the Royal Military Academy Sandhurst in 1993 and served for 26 years before retiring in November 2019 with the rank of Colonel.

Sunderland was commissioned in the Royal Logistic Corps as a second lieutenant on 7 August 1993, with seniority in that rank from 11 August 1990, and promoted the same day to lieutenant and granted seniority from 11 August 1992. He was promoted to captain on 11 August 1995, and to major on 31 July 2002.

Sunderland was promoted to lieutenant colonel on 30 June 2012. From 2014 to 2016, he was commanding officer of 27 Regiment Royal Logistic Corps based in Aldershot. He was promoted to colonel on 30 June 2018. His final post was as commander of the Army Engagement Group.

== Parliamentary career ==
At the 2019 general election, Sunderland was elected to Parliament as MP for Bracknell with 58.7% of the vote and a majority of 19,829.

Following an interim report on the connections between colonialism and properties now in the care of the National Trust, including links with historic slavery, Sunderland was among the signatories of a letter to The Telegraph in November 2020 from the "Common Sense Group" of Conservative Parliamentarians. The letter accused the National Trust of being "coloured by cultural Marxist dogma, colloquially known as the 'woke agenda'".

In March 2021 Sunderland was elected as the chairman of the Armed Forces Bill Select Committee.

He responded to claims that the Boundary Commission charged with redistricting the Bracknell Constituency purposefully redrew the maps to aid Conservatives by saying "I am comfortable that fairness has been employed and that the fundamental principles that underpin it have been robustly honoured".

In the Government reshuffle of September 2021, Sunderland received his first official appointment, as a parliamentary private secretary (PPS) to the ministerial team at the Ministry of Defence. On 13 June 2022, he was moved to the role of PPS to George Eustice, the Secretary of State for Environment, Food and Rural Affairs. He resigned from this position on 6 July 2022, in protest at Boris Johnson's conduct in the Chris Pincher scandal.

In February 2023, Sunderland was re-selected as the Conservative candidate for Bracknell but narrowly lost his seat to Labour's Peter Swallow at the 2024 general election.

== Post-parliamentary career ==
Following his defeat at the 2024 UK General Election, Sunderland returned to the British Army and works as the Director of the Army Discipline Review.

Parliament of the United Kingdom
Preceded by Phillip Lee	Member of Parliament for Bracknell; 2019–2024	Succeeded by Peter Swallow
