= Bracknell (constituency) =

UK Parliament constituency (since 1997)

Coordinates: 51.38°N 0.76°W

- County constituency for the House of Commons
- Boundaries since 2024
- Boundary of Bracknell in South East England
- County: Berkshire
- Population: 104,849 (2011 census)
- Electorate: 70,247 (2023)
- Major settlements: Bracknell, Sandhurst, Crowthorne

Current constituency
- Created: 1997
- Member of Parliament: Peter Swallow (Labour)
- Seats: One
- Created from: East Berkshire

Bracknell is a constituency (Note: A borough constituency (for the purposes of election expenses and type of returning officer)) in Berkshire represented in the House of Commons of the UK Parliament since 2024 by Peter Swallow, from the Labour Party. (Note: As with all constituencies, the constituency elects one Member of Parliament (MP) by the first past the post system of election at least every five years.) It was created for the 1997 general election, largely replacing the abolished county constituency of East Berkshire.

== Constituency profile ==
The Bracknell constituency is located within the Bracknell Forest borough in the county of Berkshire. It contains most of the large town of Bracknell (excluding some outer suburbs) and an area to the south including the town of Sandhurst and most of the village of Crowthorne. Bracknell was designated a new town after World War II and rapidly expanded to accommodate the London overspill. Sandhurst has a long association with the British Armed Forces as the location of the Royal Military Academy Sandhurst.

Compared to national averages, residents of the constituency are younger, wealthier and have higher rates of employment. There is some deprivation in Bracknell, however Sandhurst is amongst the 10% least-deprived areas in the country. The ethnic makeup of the constituency is similar to the country as a whole. At the most recent borough council election in 2023, all seats in Bracknell were won by Labour Party candidates, whilst Conservative and Liberal Democrat councillors were elected in Sandhurst and Crowthorne. An estimated 55% of voters in the constituency supported leaving the European Union in the 2016 referendum, slightly higher than the national figure of 52%.

== History ==
From its creation in 1997 until 2010, Bracknell's MP was Andrew MacKay of the Conservative Party, who represented the old seat of East Berkshire from 1983. On 14 May 2009, he resigned from his position as parliamentary aide to David Cameron in the wake of a major scandal over his Parliamentary expenses. MacKay and his wife, fellow Tory MP Julie Kirkbride, had wrongfully claimed over £250,000 from the taxpayer for mortgage payments for second homes, in a case of so-called 'double-dipping'. They also wrongfully claimed for each other's travel costs. At a hastily called meeting with his constituents in Bracknell to explain the "unacceptable" expenses claims, Mr MacKay was jeered and called a "thieving toad". A video of the angry meeting was leaked to the press and, after an urgent phone call from David Cameron the next day, MacKay agreed to stand down at the 2010 general election. The Conservative Party chose Phillip Lee, a general practitioner, as its new candidate in an American-style open primary, involving seven candidates including Rory Stewart and Iain Dale, in a contest open to all registered Bracknell voters.

2010 election

Lee went on to become the next MP in an election which saw the share of the vote for the Labour Party fall by 11.1%. The Liberal Democrats saw the biggest rise in support of all the parties (+4.5%), overtaking Labour to gain second place behind the Conservative Party. UKIP saw a slight rise in support to 4.4% of the vote. The 2010 election also saw for the first time the Green Party and British National Party vying for the seat.

2017 election

Lee held his seat at the 2017 general election. His vote share rose by 3%, but Labour increased its share by 13.3%. Lee received 32,882 votes, Paul Bidwell (Labour) in second place had 16,866 votes. On 3 September 2019, Lee resigned from the Conservative Party to join the Liberal Democrats due to the Conservative Party's support for Brexit. At the 2019 general election he unsuccessfully contested the adjacent Wokingham constituency for the Lib Dems.

2019 election

Following the defection of Lee, James Sunderland was speedily selected as the Conservative candidate for the general election of December 2019 and was elected with 58.7% of the votes.

2024 election

Sunderland ran for re-election as Conservative MP for the constituency, but was narrowly defeated by Labour's Peter Swallow on a 16% swing. This marked the first time Labour had ever gained the seat, and the first time a Conservative had not been elected to represent the area since it became covered by a single-member constituency in the late 19th century. Notably, Labour had previously gained control of Bracknell Forest Borough Council for the first time since 1997 in 2023.

== Boundaries and boundary changes ==
Bracknell is based around the town of Bracknell and the Bracknell Forest authority. It is bordered by the constituencies of Wokingham, Maidenhead, Windsor, Surrey Heath, Aldershot, and North East Hampshire.

=== 1997–2010 ===
- The Borough of Bracknell Forest wards of Binfield, Bullbrook, Central Sandhurst, College Town, Crowthorne, Garth, Great Hollands North, Great Hollands South, Hanworth, Harmanswater, Little Sandhurst, Old Bracknell, Owlsmoor, Priestwood, Warfield, and Wildridings; and
- The District of Wokingham wards of Finchampstead North, Finchampstead South, and Wokingham Without.

The Borough of Bracknell Forest wards had formed the majority of the abolished constituency of East Berkshire. The two Finchampstead wards were transferred from Reading East, and the ward of Wokingham Without was transferred from Wokingham.

=== 2010–2024 ===
Map of boundaries 2010-2024
- The Borough of Bracknell Forest wards of Bullbrook, Central Sandhurst, College Town, Crown Wood, Crowthorne, Great Hollands North, Great Hollands South, Hanworth, Harmanswater, Little Sandhurst and Wellington, Old Bracknell, Owlsmoor, Priestwood and Garth, and Wildridings and Central; and
- The District of Wokingham wards of Finchampstead North, Finchampstead South, and Wokingham Without.

Northern areas, including Binfield, were transferred to Windsor.

=== 2024–present ===
Further to the 2023 Periodic Review of Westminster constituencies which came into effect for 2024 general election, the seat lost its District of Wokingham wards to the Wokingham constituency in order to bring its electorate within the permitted range. To partly compensate, the Warfield Harvest Ride ward (as it existed on 1 December 2020) was transferred from Windsor.

Following a local government boundary review which came into effect in May 2023, the constituency now comprises the following from the 2024 general election:

- The Borough of Bracknell Forest wards and part wards of: Binfield North & Warfield West (small part); Binfield South & Jennett's Park (part); Bullbrook; Crowthorne; Easthampstead & Wildridings; Great Hollands; Hanworth; Harmans Water & Crown Wood; Owlsmoor & College Town; Priestwood & Garth; Sandhurst; Swinley Forest (most); Town Centre & The Parks; Whitegrove (most).

== Members of Parliament ==
East Berkshire prior to 1997

| Election | Member | Party |
|---|---|---|
| 1997 | Andrew MacKay | Conservative |
| 2010 | Phillip Lee | Conservative |
| September 2019 | Phillip Lee | Liberal Democrat |
| 2019 | James Sunderland | Conservative |
| 2024 | Peter Swallow | Labour |

== Elections ==
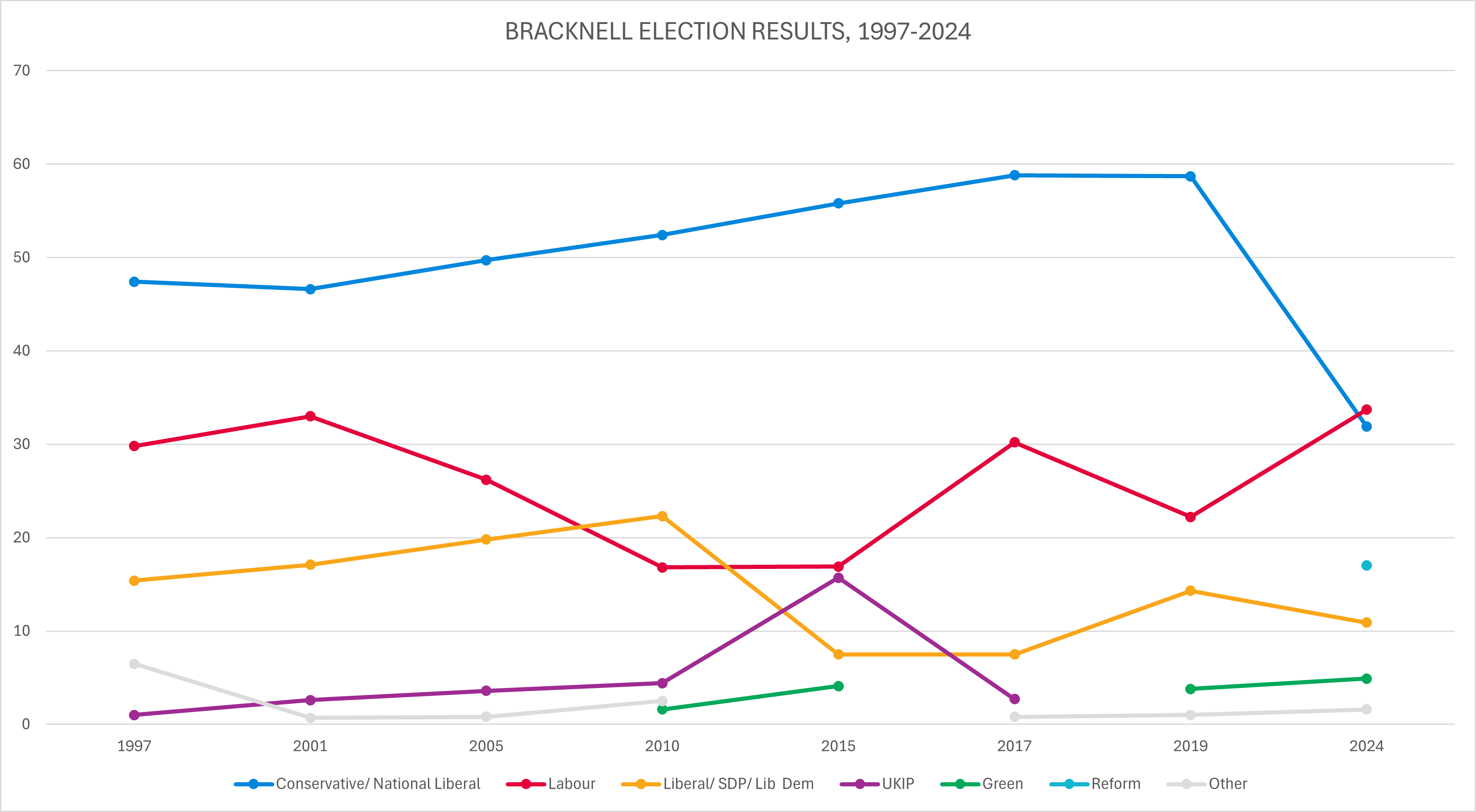
Election results 1997–2024

=== Elections in the 2020s ===
General election 2024: Bracknell
| Party | Candidate | Votes | % | ±% |
|---|---|---|---|---|
| Labour | Peter Swallow | 14,783 | 33.7 | +8.3 |
| Conservative | James Sunderland | 13,999 | 31.9 | −23.6 |
| Reform UK | Malcolm Tullett | 7,445 | 17.0 | N/A |
| Liberal Democrats | Katie Mansfield | 4,768 | 10.9 | −3.1 |
| Green | Emily Torode | 2,166 | 4.9 | +0.9 |
| Independent | Olivio Barreto | 480 | 1.1 | −0.1 |
| Heritage | Jason Reardon | 196 | 0.5 | N/A |
| Majority | | 784 | 1.8 | N/A |
| Turnout | | 43,837 | 61.4 | −5.3 |
| Registered electors | | 71,660 | | |
| Labour gain from Conservative | | Swing | +16.0 | |

=== Elections in the 2010s ===
2019 notional result
| Party | Vote | % |
|---|---|---|
| Conservative | 26,022 | 55.5 |
| Labour | 11,893 | 25.4 |
| Liberal Democrats | 6,555 | 14.0 |
| Green | 1,865 | 4.0 |
| Others | 553 | 1.2 |
| Turnout | 46,888 | 66.7 |
| Electorate | 70,247 | |

General election 2019: Bracknell
| Party | Candidate | Votes | % | ±% |
|---|---|---|---|---|
| Conservative | James Sunderland | 31,894 | 58.7 | −0.1 |
| Labour | Paul Bidwell | 12,065 | 22.2 | −8.0 |
| Liberal Democrats | Kaweh Beheshtizadeh | 7,749 | 14.3 | +6.8 |
| Green | Derek Florey | 2,089 | 3.8 | N/A |
| Independent | Olivio Barreto | 553 | 1.0 | +0.2 |
| Majority | | 19,829 | 36.5 | +7.9 |
| Turnout | | 54,350 | 68.6 | −2.0 |
| Conservative hold | | Swing | +3.9 | |

General election 2017: Bracknell
| Party | Candidate | Votes | % | ±% |
|---|---|---|---|---|
| Conservative | Phillip Lee | 32,882 | 58.8 | +3.0 |
| Labour | Paul Bidwell | 16,866 | 30.2 | +13.3 |
| Liberal Democrats | Patrick Smith | 4,186 | 7.5 | ±0.0 |
| UKIP | Len Amos | 1,521 | 2.7 | −13.0 |
| Independent | Olivio Barreto | 437 | 0.8 | N/A |
| Majority | | 16,016 | 28.6 | −10.3 |
| Turnout | | 55,892 | 70.6 | +5.3 |
| Conservative hold | | Swing | −5.1 | |

General election 2015: Bracknell
| Party | Candidate | Votes | % | ±% |
|---|---|---|---|---|
| Conservative | Phillip Lee | 29,606 | 55.8 | +3.4 |
| Labour | James Walsh | 8,956 | 16.9 | +0.1 |
| UKIP | Richard Thomas | 8,339 | 15.7 | +11.3 |
| Liberal Democrats | Patrick Smith | 3,983 | 7.5 | −14.8 |
| Green | Derek Florey | 2,202 | 4.1 | +2.5 |
| Majority | | 20,650 | 38.9 | +8.8 |
| Turnout | | 53,086 | 65.3 | −2.5 |
| Conservative hold | | Swing | | |

General election 2010: Bracknell
| Party | Candidate | Votes | % | ±% |
|---|---|---|---|---|
| Conservative | Phillip Lee | 27,327 | 52.4 | +2.5 |
| Liberal Democrats | Raymond Earwicker | 11,623 | 22.3 | +4.5 |
| Labour | John Piasecki | 8,755 | 16.8 | −11.1 |
| UKIP | Murray Barter | 2,297 | 4.4 | +0.9 |
| BNP | Mark Burke | 1,253 | 2.4 | N/A |
| Green | David Young | 821 | 1.6 | N/A |
| Scrap Members Allowances | Dan Haycocks | 60 | 0.1 | N/A |
| Majority | | 15,704 | 30.1 | +6.6 |
| Turnout | | 52,140 | 67.8 | +5.1 |
| Conservative hold | | Swing | −1.0 | |

=== Elections in the 2000s ===
General election 2005: Bracknell
| Party | Candidate | Votes | % | ±% |
|---|---|---|---|---|
| Conservative | Andrew MacKay | 25,412 | 49.7 | +3.1 |
| Labour | Janet Keene | 13,376 | 26.2 | −6.8 |
| Liberal Democrats | Lee Glendon | 10,128 | 19.8 | +2.7 |
| UKIP | Vincent Pearson | 1,818 | 3.6 | +1.0 |
| Independent | Dominica Roberts | 407 | 0.8 | N/A |
| Majority | | 12,036 | 23.5 | +9.9 |
| Turnout | | 51,141 | 63.4 | +2.7 |
| Conservative hold | | Swing | +5.0 | |

General election 2001: Bracknell
| Party | Candidate | Votes | % | ±% |
|---|---|---|---|---|
| Conservative | Andrew MacKay | 22,962 | 46.6 | −0.8 |
| Labour | Janet Keene | 16,249 | 33.0 | +3.2 |
| Liberal Democrats | Raymond Earwicker | 8,428 | 17.1 | +1.7 |
| UKIP | Lawrence Boxall | 1,266 | 2.6 | +1.6 |
| ProLife Alliance | Dominica Roberts | 324 | 0.7 | +0.2 |
| Majority | | 6,713 | 13.6 | −4.0 |
| Turnout | | 49,229 | 60.7 | −13.8 |
| Conservative hold | | Swing | −2.0 | |

=== Elections in the 1990s ===
General election 1997: Bracknell
| Party | Candidate | Votes | % | ±% |
|---|---|---|---|---|
| Conservative | Andrew MacKay | 27,983 | 47.4 | |
| Labour | Anne Snelgrove | 17,596 | 29.8 | |
| Liberal Democrats | Alan Hilliar | 9,122 | 15.4 | |
| Independent | John Tompkins | 1,909 | 3.2 | |
| Referendum | Warwick Cairns | 1,636 | 2.8 | |
| UKIP | Lawrence Boxall | 569 | 1.0 | |
| ProLife Alliance | Dominica Roberts | 276 | 0.5 | |
| Majority | | 10,387 | 17.6 | |
| Turnout | | 59,091 | 74.5 | |
| Conservative win (new seat) | | | | |

== See also ==
- List of parliamentary constituencies in Berkshire
- List of parliamentary constituencies in the South East England (region)
