= Reading South =

UK Parliament constituency (1950–1955, 1974–1983)

- Former borough constituency for the House of Commons
- Boundary of Reading South in Berkshire, boundaries 1974-83
- County: Berkshire
- Major settlements: Reading

1950–1955
- Created from: Reading
- Replaced by: Reading

1974–1983
- Type of constituency: Borough constituency
- Created from: Reading
- Replaced by: Reading East, Reading West and Wokingham

Reading South was a borough constituency represented in the House of Commons of the Parliament of the United Kingdom. It elected one Member of Parliament (MP) by the first past the post system of election. The constituency covered an area in and around the town of Reading in the county of Berkshire.

== History ==
The Reading South parliamentary constituency was first created for the 1950 general election by splitting the previous parliamentary constituency of Reading into North and South divisions. These constituencies were merged back into a single Reading constituency in for the 1955 general election.

The Reading South constituency was recreated in 1974, when the majority comprised areas outside the County Borough. In 1983 the constituencies in Reading were reorganised, creating the new constituencies of Reading East and Reading West.

== Boundaries ==
=== 1950–1955 ===
The County Borough of Reading wards of Church, East, Katesgrove, Minster, Redlands, and West.

It was then abolished and absorbed into the re-established constituency of Reading, with the exception of the East ward, which was transferred to Wokingham.

=== 1974–1983 ===
- The County Borough of Reading wards of Christchurch, Park, Redlands, and Whitley; and
- The Rural District of Wokingham parishes of Arborfield and Newland, Barkham, Earley, Finchampstead, Shinfield, Sonning, Swallowfield, Winnersh, and Woodley and Sandford.

The Park ward of the County Borough of Reading was transferred from Wokingham, along with western parts of the Rural District thereof. The remaining wards of the County Borough were previously part of the abolished constituency of Reading.

The constituency was abolished again for the 1983 general election, with the majority forming the basis of the new County Constituency of Reading East. The north-western areas transferred back to Wokingham.

== Members of Parliament ==
=== MPs 1950–1955 ===
Election	Member	Party	Notes
1950	Ian Mikardo	Labour	Contested Reading following redistribution
1955	constituency abolished – see Reading		

=== MPs 1974–1983 ===
Election	Member	Party	Notes
Feb 1974	Gerard Vaughan	Conservative	Member for main predecessor seat (1970–1974); Contested Reading East following redistribution
1983	constituency abolished – see Reading East, Reading West and Wokingham		

== Election results ==
=== Elections in the 1970s ===
General election 1979: Reading South
Party	Candidate	Votes	%	±%
Conservative	Gerard Vaughan	30,067	53.9	+11.3
Labour	Bernard Gale	14,422	25.8	–2.0
Liberal	Keith Watts	10,642	19.1	–10.6
Ecology	Peter Dunn	700	1.3	New
Majority		15,645	28.0	+15.1
Turnout		55,831	76.5	+1.8
Registered electors		73,001		
Conservative hold		Swing	+6.67	

General election October 1974: Reading South
Party	Candidate	Votes	%	±%
Conservative	Gerard Vaughan	21,959	42.5	–0.3
Liberal	Paul Burall	15,293	29.6	–3.5
Labour	Lawrence Silverman	14,375	27.8	+3.8
Majority		6,666	12.9	+3.3
Turnout		51,627	74.7	–6.3
Registered electors		69,124		
Conservative hold		Swing	+1.6	

General election February 1974: Reading South
Party	Candidate	Votes	%	±%
Conservative	Gerard Vaughan	23,735	42.8	–4.7
Liberal	Paul Burall	18,376	33.1	+17.0
Labour	Gerd Kaufman	13,358	24.1	–12.4
Majority		5,349	9.7	–1.4
Turnout		55,469	81.0	+8.4
Registered electors		68,500		
Conservative hold		Swing	–10.8	

1970 notional result
Party	Vote	%
Conservative	22,400	47.5
Labour	17,200	36.4
Liberal	7,600	16.1
Turnout	47,200	72.5
Electorate	65,074	

=== Elections in the 1950s ===
General election 1951: Reading South
Party	Candidate	Votes	%	±%
Labour	Ian Mikardo	18,570	51.4	+2.7
Conservative	Harold Pryce	17,561	48.6	+6.1
Majority		1,009	2.8	–3.4
Turnout		36,131	86.7	–1.4
Registered electors		41,694		
Labour hold		Swing	–1.7	

General election 1950: Reading South
Party	Candidate	Votes	%
Labour	Ian Mikardo	17,704	48.7
Conservative	DC Rissik	15,450	42.5
Liberal	Gerald Opperman	3,225	8.9
Majority		2,254	6.2
Turnout		36,379	88.1
Registered electors		41,307	
Labour win (new seat)			

== Politics and history of the constituency ==
The Reading South parliamentary constituency was first created for the 1950 general election by splitting the previous parliamentary constituency of Reading into North and South divisions. The seat was contested and won for the Labour Party by Ian Mikardo, the sitting MP for the Reading constituency, who held the seat until it was merged back into a single Reading constituency for the 1955 general election.

The Reading South constituency was recreated in 1974, when it was contested and won for the Conservative Party by Gerard Vaughan, the sitting MP for the Reading constituency. For the 1983 general election the constituencies in Reading were reorganised, creating the new constituencies of Reading East and Reading West. Gerard Vaughan went on to hold the Reading East constituency until he stood down at the 1997 general election.

== See also ==
- List of parliamentary constituencies in Berkshire
