= Tony Page =

British Labour party politician

Tony Page (formally Antony William Page), is a British Labour party politician who served as the Mayor of Reading and was a former parliamentary candidate. He held a seat on Reading Borough Council for 51 years – from his election in 1973 to his retirement in 2024.

Upon his retirement, Council Leader Liz Terry described him as "probably the most well-known of all Reading politicians." In recognition of his contributions, Page received an honorary Doctor of Letters from the University of Reading in July 2023. Furthermore, in October 2024, he was honoured with an award from the Local Government Information Unit.

== Early life and education ==
Tony Page is on record as saying that he was taken on one of the Aldermaston marches at the age of six by his parents, who were both members of CND. He graduated from the University of Reading with a Bachelor of Arts in Politics in 1975, two years after he was first elected as a local councillor.

== Reading Borough Council ==
Tony Page was first elected to Reading Borough Council on June 7, 1973, as the councillor for the now-defunct Castle Ward. He was 19 years old at the time, despite the (then) legal requirement for councillors to be at least 21. Subsequently, he represented Abbey Ward, which encompasses a similar area of the town centre as his initial ward. Throughout his tenure on the council, he has held various positions, including Chair of the Transport Committee from 1986 to 1990, and Lead Member for Strategic Environment, Planning, and Transport from 2008 to 2023.

Councillor Page served as deputy leader of the council from 2008 to 2023. His long tenure made him a prominent figure in the town. In May 2023, Councillor Page was appointed Mayor of Reading, a largely ceremonial role. In October of that year, he announced his intention to retire as a councillor at the conclusion of his mayoral term in May 2024.

== Parliamentary candidature ==
In the 2005 general election, Tony Page stood as candidate for the Labour party in Reading East parliamentary constituency, following the deselection of Jane Griffiths, who previously held the seat for the same party. He came second, losing to Rob Wilson of the Conservative Party by 475 votes.

== Other roles ==
From 1986 to 2005, Tony Page was the chairman of Reading Transport Ltd, the town's arms length council owned bus company. From 2013 to 2023, he was chair of the Berkshire Local Transport Body, the local transport body responsible for determining the priorities for transport investment across Berkshire.
