= Matt Rodda =

British politician (born 1966)

Matt Rodda MP
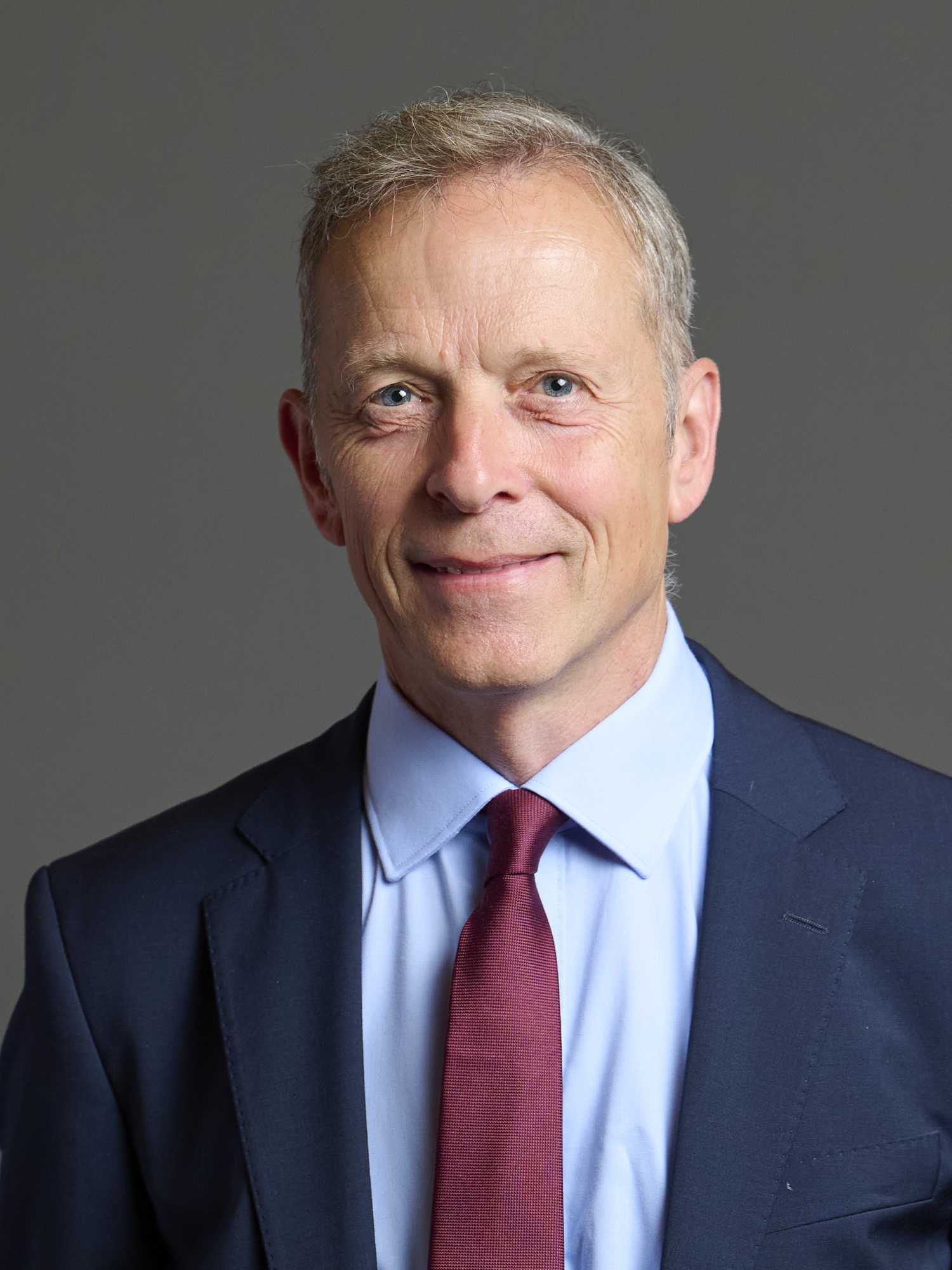
- Official portrait, 2024

Shadow Minister for AI and Intellectual Property
- In office 5 September 2023 – 7 July 2024
- Leader: Keir Starmer
- Preceded by: Office established

Shadow Minister for Pensions
- In office 7 January 2021 – 7 July 2024
- Leader: Keir Starmer
- Preceded by: Jack Dromey
- Succeeded by: Gill Furniss

Shadow Minister for Buses
- In office 12 January 2018 – 7 January 2021
- Leader: Jeremy Corbyn; Keir Starmer
- Preceded by: Richard Burden
- Succeeded by: Sam Tarry

Member of Parliament for Reading Central Reading East (2017–2024)
- Incumbent
- Assumed office 8 June 2017
- Preceded by: Rob Wilson
- Majority: 12,637 (27.9%)

Personal details
- Born: 15 December 1966 (age 59)
- Party: Labour
- Education: University of Sussex
- Website: Official website

Matthew Richard Allen Rodda (born 28 December 1966) is a British Labour Party politician, former journalist, and civil servant who has been the Member of Parliament (MP) for Reading Central, previously Reading East, since 2017.

== Early life and career ==
Matthew Rodda was born on 28 December 1966, and raised in Wallingford, Oxfordshire, England. He studied history at the University of Sussex, graduating with a Bachelor of Arts (BA) degree in 1989. He then trained as a journalist with Thomson.

After graduating, he worked for the Coventry Telegraph and was a journalist for The Independent newspaper, specialising in education news. He later became a civil servant in the Department for Education and subsequently worked in the charity sector and for the Higher Education Academy.

In October 1999, he survived the Ladbroke Grove rail crash, an event to which he has attributed his desire to contribute to the community.

== Parliamentary career ==
Rodda stood as the Labour candidate in East Surrey at the 2010 general election, coming third with 9% of the vote behind the Conservative candidate Sam Gyimah and the Liberal Democrat candidate.

At the 2015 general election, Rodda stood in Reading East, coming second with 33.1% of the vote behind the incumbent Conservative MP Rob Wilson.

Rodda was elected to Parliament as MP for Reading East at the snap 2017 general election with 49% of the vote and a majority of 3,749.

In January 2018, Rodda was promoted to a frontbench position in a Shadow Cabinet mini-shuffle, becoming the Shadow Minister for Local Transport.

At the 2019 general election, Rodda was re-elected as MP for Reading East with a decreased vote share of 48.5% and an increased majority of 5,924.

Rodda nominated Emily Thornberry for the 2020 Labour leadership election.

In the first Starmer shadow cabinet, Rodda was appointed Shadow Minister for Buses.

In January 2021, Rodda was appointed Shadow Minister for Pensions after Jack Dromey was promoted to the Shadow Cabinet Office after Helen Hayes resigned to abstain on the Brexit Bill. Rodda was replaced as Shadow Minister for Buses by Sam Tarry. In the 2023 British shadow cabinet reshuffle, he was appointed Shadow Minister for AI and Intellectual Property.

Due to the 2023 review of Westminster constituencies, Rodda's constituency of Reading East was abolished and replaced with Reading Central. At the 2024 general election, Rodda was elected to Parliament as MP for Reading Central with 47.7% of the vote and a majority of 12,637.

Parliament of the United Kingdom
Preceded by Rob Wilson	Member of Parliament for Reading East; 2017–present	Incumbent
