= Douai School =

Former English school in Woolhampton

- Upper Woolhampton, Berkshire; England

Information
- Type: Private
- Motto: Dominus mihi adjutor (Latin: "The Lord is my aid")
- Religious affiliation: Roman Catholic
- Established: 1615 (re-founded 1818 and 1903)
- Founder: St. Edmund's Monastery (Paris)
- Closed: 1999
- Gender: Boys
- Age: 13 to 18
- Enrollment: approx. 200
- Houses: Faringdon ; Gifford ; Samson ; Walmesley
- Colours: Blue and gold
- Publication: Douai Magazine
- Former pupils: Old Dowegians
- Song: Ad multos annos
- Website: douai.co.uk (archived)

Douai School was a public (fee-charging boarding) school run by the Douai Abbey Benedictine community at Woolhampton, England, until it closed in 1999.

== History ==
=== 1615–1818 ===
The monastic community was founded in Paris in 1615 and moved to Douai after the French Revolution taking over the former buildings of the community of St Gregory. The monastery provided educational opportunities from the beginning, but had no formal school in its first decades of existence. A boarding school later emerged in a dependent priory at La Celle.

=== 1818–1903 ===
Following the move to Douai in 1818, and the refoundation of the community by Richard Marsh, a more recognisable school emerged and by 1823, there were 28 boys on the roll. Around that time, the fees for students were being advertised at £32 a year or £30 for church students. Links with the Roman Catholic dioceses in England were crucial to the school's survival. In the 1880s the Roman Catholic Archdiocese of Birmingham was sending seven boys a year to the school. Rather than the vertical house system of English schools, Douai retained the horizontal divisions of 'Rhetoric', 'Poetry', 'Grammar' and 'Syntax' throughout the nineteenth century, and even for a time in its new home in England.

=== 1903–1999 ===
The modern school in Woolhampton, Berkshire was formed by the site's pre-existing St Mary's College's merging with the school of the incoming Benedictine community that moved from Douai in June 1903 as a result of Waldeck-Rousseau's Law of Associations (1901). Former pupils lobbied the Irish Parliamentary Party to raise the matter of the expulsion in Parliament. However it was Roman Catholic English Conservatives who espoused the cause: Lord Edmund Talbot in the House of Commons and 11th Lord Herries of Terregles in the House of Lords.

The merger produced a school of 109 boy boarders, which had fallen to only 63 by 1911. Its long history in France and its monastic influence meant that Douai, although an independent boarding school, had in large part escaped the influence of the public school ethos that had developed in 19th-century England. However, in 1920, Douai was admitted to membership of the Headmasters' Conference. In the 1930s David Matthew, later Apostolic Delegate for Africa, congratulated the headmaster, Ignatius Rice, on the fact that: "no Catholic school has been so free from the influence of Arnold of Rugby as Douai has been."

Day boys were admitted from the early 1960s, when annual boarding fees were £360. By 1984, there was a record number of 333 pupils. The school became co-educational in 1993. After several years of financial difficulty, exacerbated by rumours of abuse, it closed in 1999.

=== Post closure ===
In November 2017, a former House Master at Douai, Father Michael Creagh, was sentenced at Reading Crown Court after pleading guilty to two counts of child abuse offences which were committed while he was at the Boarding School.

== Buildings ==
In 1786, the Earl of Fingall, the squire of Woolhampton sold his Woolhampton estate and moved to Ireland. His family had been recusant Roman Catholics and had maintained a chapel and chaplain at Woolhampton House (now Elstree School). On leaving the neighbourhood he left his chaplain to minister to the local Roman Catholics and endowed him with some 7 acres (28,000 m^{2}) of lands and some cottages. Three of these cottages stood on the site of the entrance tower, and in one of these, Woolhampton Lodge, the priest lived and had a chapel.

The oldest part of the current buildings date from around 1830. The main entrance and tower were constructed in 1888 in the Tudor Gothic style; the architect was Frederick Walters. In 1829 Fr Stephen Dambrine was appointed to Woolhampton. He embarked on a building programme which included a chapel in the Gothic style opened in 1833 to replace the chapel in Woolhampton Lodge, and which itself was replaced by the present St Mary's in 1848.

The cricket pavilion was built in 1922 to honour the 56 Old Boys of both Douai and St Mary's College who were killed in the First World War.

In the early years at Woolhampton, the school was seen as an appendage to the monastery and it was only with the foundation of a separate abbey church in the 1930s and the creation of distinct school and monastic refectories in 1944 that a degree of separation emerged. The Monastery was greatly expanded in the 1960s with the building of the new monastery designed by Sir Frederick Gibberd.

In 1983, the gatehouse, hall and three blocks of buildings were grade II listed.

Haydock Hall, the study hall, was briefly converted into a film set for the shooting of the dormitory scenes in the 1990 film Three Men and a Little Lady. The former school buildings were also used as a location for the 2002 television film of Goodbye, Mr. Chips.

In the early 2000s, the former buildings of the school were adapted into housing, as the Avalon residential development, developed by Bewley Homes and ADAM Urbanism. In the existing school buildings 33 apartments were built, and 44 further apartments were built elsewhere on the site, arranged around enclosed courtyards in a way that reflects the traditional architecture of English schools and colleges.

In July 2017, a clubhouse for Old Boys and a museum was opened on the site of the former cricket pavilion.

== Houses ==
In 1951, the school was finally divided into houses, each under a monastic housemaster: Samson House, named after Abbot Samson of medieval Bury St Edmunds; Faringdon House, named after the martyred last abbot of Reading Abbey Hugh Faringdon; Walmesley House, after Bishop Charles Walmesley, the eighteenth-century member of the Community who had been a mathematician and astronomer. In 1980, a new house was created Gifford House, to commemorate Archbishop Gabriel Gifford. Faringdon ceased to exist in 1992, again leaving just three Houses.

== Headmasters ==
The first headmaster was not appointed until 1909, replacing the older system of a Prefect of Studies and a Prefect of Discipline jointly managing the school under the oversight of the Abbot. A series of headmasters followed in quick succession, before stability was provided by Fr Ignatius Rice (headmaster 1915–1952).

Ignatius Rice was a friend of G. K. Chesterton whose Father Brown novels were based on Father O'Connor, a mutual friend, and he was influential in Chesterton's conversion to Roman Catholicism in 1922. In his younger days he played cricket for Warwickshire during the summer holidays and for some years enjoyed the distinction of being the only monk whose cricket performances were chronicled in Wisden.

In 2005, Edmund Power (headmaster 1993–97) was elected Abbot of the Basilica of Saint Paul Outside the Walls in Rome.

=== List of Headmasters ===
- Fr Adrian Coughlin OSB (1909–1911)
- Fr Laurence Powell OSB (1911–1915)
- Fr Antony Richardson OSB (1915)
- Fr Ignatius Rice OSB (1915–1952)
- Fr Alphonsus Tierney OSB (1952–1973)
- Fr Brian Murphy OSB (1973–1975)
- Fr Wilfrid Sollom OSB PhD DIC (1975–1987)
- Fr Geoffrey Scott OSB PhD FSA FRHistS (1987–1993)
- Fr Edmund Power OSB PhD (1993–1997)
- Peter McLaughlin PhD (1997–1999)

== Former pupils ==
Former pupils are known as Old Dowegians and are eligible to join the Douai Society, founded in 1868.

Notable former pupils include:

=== La Celle ===
- Patrick Cary (c.1623-57), poet
- Rev Francis Fenwick (1645–94), monk
- Sir Thomas Gascoigne (1745–1810), travel writer and Whig MP
- Henry Howard (1757–1842), historian
- Henry Swinburne (1743–1803), travel writer
- Sir John Swinburne, Bt (1762–1860), Whig MP

=== St Edmund's College, Douai ===
- Most Rev James Billsborrow (1862–1931), Archbishop of Cardiff
- William Canton (1845–1926), author
- Rt Rev Bernard Collier (1802–90), Bishop of Port-Louis
- Rt Rev William Cotter (1866–1940), Bishop of Portsmouth
- Rt Rev Joseph Cowgill (1860–1936), Bishop of Leeds
- Edward Micklethwaite Curr (1820–1889), Australian settler
- Gustave Doyen (1836–1923), French painter
- Rt Rev Robert Fraser (1858–1914), Bishop of Dunkeld
- Rt Rev Matthew Harkins (1845–1921), American Bishop of Providence
- Michael A. Healy (1839–1904), US Coast Guard commander
- Most Rev Dr Frederick Keating (1859–1928), Archbishop of Liverpool
- Most Rev John McIntyre (1855–1935), Archbishop of Birmingham
- Rt Rev John McNulty (1879–1943), Bishop of Nottingham
- Monsignor John O'Connor (1870–1952), priest
- Most Rev Benedict Scarisbrick OSB (1828–1908), Archbishop of Cyzicus
- Rt Rev Thomas Pearson OSB (1870–1938), Bishop of Lancaster
- Fr Ignatius Rice OSB (1883–1955), headmaster
- Luis Subercaseaux (1882–1973), Chilean athlete and diplomat
- Pedro Subercaseaux (1880–1956), Chilean painter and priest
- Georges Tattegrain (1845–1916), French lawyer and poet

=== St Mary's College, Woolhampton ===
- A.M. Burrage (1889–1956), author
- Rt Rev Arthur Doubleday (1865–1951), Bishop of Brentwood

=== Douai School, Woolhampton ===
- Juan Edgardo Angara (1972– ), Filipino politician
- Adrian Dally (1966- ), former senior civil servant, including private secretary to two cabinet ministers, and currently Director of Motor Finance and Strategy at the Finance and Leasing Association
- Anthony Bertram (1897–1978), art historian and novelist
- Michael Blower MBE (1929– ), architect
- Sir Daniel Brabin MC QC (1913–75), judge
- Pablo Casado Blanco (1981- ), Spanish Leader of the Opposition 2018-22
- Sir Edward William Dutton Colt, Bt (1936– )
- Simon Craven (1961–90), 8th Earl of Craven
- J. A. Cuddon (1928–96), writer
- Tristan Davies (1956– ), journalist
- Christopher Derrick (1921–2007), writer
- Michael Derrick (1915–67), journalist and Liberal politician
- Brian Andre Doyle (1911–2004), Chief Justice of Zambia
- Brigadier Hedley Duncan (1944– ), Yeoman Usher of the Black Rod
- Ben Emmerson QC (1963– ), human rights lawyer
- Guy Farley (1963- ), composer
- Michael Geoghegan CBE (1953– ), Chief Executive of HSBC
- Gerard Goalen (1919- ), architect
- David Gold (1979- ), bridge player
- Sir Brandon Gough DL (1937–2012), businessman
- Lord Harvington (Sir Robert Grant-Ferris) (1907–97), Conservative politician
- Rev Professor Adrian Hastings (1929–2001), historian
- Dominic Hill (1969– ), theatre director
- Paul Jennings (1918–98), journalist and humorist
- P. J. Kavanagh (1931–2015), poet
- Frank Keating (1937–2013), journalist, The Guardian
- Colonel Chris Keeble DSO (1941– ) soldier, Parachute Regiment.
- Prince Ludwig of Bavaria (1982– )
- Norbert Lynton (1927–2007), art historian
- David Mackay (1933–2014), architect
- Patrick Malahide (1945– ), actor
- Paul Mahoney (1946- ), judge
- Most Rev Joseph Masterson (1899–1953), Archbishop of Birmingham
- Professor Henry Mayr-Harting (1936– ), historian
- Vice Admiral Sir Timothy McClement KCB OBE (1951– )
- Senator Edward McGuire (1901–92), Irish politician
- Squadron Leader Robin McNair DFC (1918–96), RAF pilot and businessman
- Hamish Miles (1925–2017), art historian
- Tim Miller (1940–2000), financier and founder of Charter88
- Anthony Milner (1925–2002), composer
- Professor D.P. O'Brien (1939– ), economist
- Terry Oldfield (1949- ), composer
- David Peacock (1924–2000), theatre manager
- James Pelly-Fry DSO (1911–94), RAF pilot
- Kevin Porée (1965– ), composer and producer
- Michael Randle (1933– ), peace campaigner
- Christopher Rudd (1963– ), cricketer
- Cecil Stafford Northcote OBE KSG (1912–2003), High Sheriff of Staffordshire
- Colonel 'Tod' Sweeney MC (1919–2001), soldier and charity director
- James Theunissen (1981- ), cricketer
- Geoff Usher-Somers MBE (1950- ), explorer
- Monsignor Gerard Tickle (1909–94), Bishop of the Forces
- Michael Tuffrey (1959– ), Liberal Democrat politician
- Sir Stephen Wall GCMG LVO (1947– ), diplomat
- Louis Wharton (1896–1957), cricketer

Fictional characters include:

- Henry Meadows, the protagonist in 'Turbulence' by Giles Foden

The Douai Society tie is black with thin multiple stripes of yellow, red, yellow, navy, yellow.

== Sport ==
Association football was introduced to the "old" school in the late 1880s. Before this, football was played to particular rules which allowed the use of hands and forbade any kicking backwards. Cricket had been played for many years in the old quad, but in 1885 a new pitch was laid at Douai's country house in Planques.

External fixtures, which were rare at old Douai, were soon organized after the move to England. Cricket and hockey were played at the new school from 1905, and from 1918 to 1919 rugby union replaced soccer as the main winter sport (soccer returned as a minor sport in 1962). In 1920, the Trinidadian Louis Wharton became Douai's first Oxford University cricketer, having won a Blue for soccer the previous year. He went on to play cricket for Somerset. After the war the Surrey all-rounder Alan Peach was cricket coach, succeeded by Frank Shipston of Nottinghamshire. An indoor swimming pool was built in 1937.

A group of spectators (at Twickenham) associated with the school is credited with introducing the song Swing Low, Sweet Chariot as an English rugby union anthem.

== Uniform ==
In the 1890s mortar boards were introduced but this innovation was soon abandoned. Eton collars were worn until the 1920s together with a blue cap surmounted by the arms of St Edmund or a bowler hat. For daily use, boys wore a morning suit. In the summer, the uniform consisted of an Oxford grey suit and a boater. Uniform gradually became more casual and, after 1945, a variety of grey suits was recognised uniform, with blazers worn in the summer. In the early years, members of the Douai cricket XI would wear full ties around the waist and half ties from their collars.

== Junior School ==
In 1948 a preparatory school (Douai Junior School) was opened at Ditcham Park, in the South Downs near Petersfield in Hampshire. The house was formerly a convalescent home requisitioned by the Royal Navy during World War II.

Boys joined the school at aged 8 and after taking the Common Entrance Examination, aged approximately 13, joined the 'Big School' in Woolhampton. In 1976 the boys from the junior school moved to the Woolhampton site and a new Ditcham House was added to Samson, Walmesley, Faringdon and Gifford Houses.

In 1976, an unrelated non-denominational school was opened at the site of Ditcham Park.

== Douai Foundation ==
In 2019, a charitable foundation was established to promote Benedictine education at home and abroad, with the Duchess of Somerset as its Patron, and Emma Catherine Rigby, Pablo Casado Blanco and Angela McHale among its ambassadors. As of June 2025, it had funded educational projects in five continents.
