= Ignatius Rice =

English monk and cricketer (1883–1955)

Personal information
- Full name: William Ignatius Rice O.S.B.
- Born: 15 March 1883; Birmingham, Warwickshire , England
- Died: 22 April 1955 (aged 72); Douai Abbey, nr. Reading, Berkshire, England
- Batting: Right-handed
- Bowling: Right-arm medium

Domestic team information
- Years: Team
- 1920: Warwickshire
- First-class debut: 5 May 1920 Warwickshire v Oxford University
- Last First-class: 8 May 1920 Warwickshire v Surrey

Career statistics
Competition	First-class
Matches	2
Runs scored	15
Batting average	3.75
100s/50s	0/0
Top score	9
Balls bowled	-
Wickets	-
Bowling average	-
5 wickets in innings	-
10 wickets in match	-
Best bowling	-
Catches/stumpings	1
- Source: cricketarchive.com, 20 November 2009

William Ignatius Rice (1883–1955), known in religion as Dom Ignatius Rice, O.S.B., was an English Benedictine monk of Douai Abbey, a headmaster of Douai School (1915–1952), and a first-class cricketer. He was reputedly "the only monk whose cricket performances were reported by Wisden".

In 1917-1918 Dom Ignatius served as a military chaplain on the Western Front.

During his 37 years as headmaster, he was an important influence on the development of Douai School, re-established in England in 1903, seeing it into the Headmasters' Conference in 1920. In the 1930s David Matthew, later Apostolic Delegate for Africa, congratulated him on the fact that: "no Catholic school has been so free from the influence of Arnold of Rugby as Douai has been."

He was a close friend of G. K. Chesterton for over thirty years, being one of four priests mentioned by Chesterton's biographer, Maisie Ward, as "especially intimate" with him (the other three being Ronald Knox, Vincent McNabb, and John O'Connor).
