= Gustave Doyen =

French painter (1836–1923)

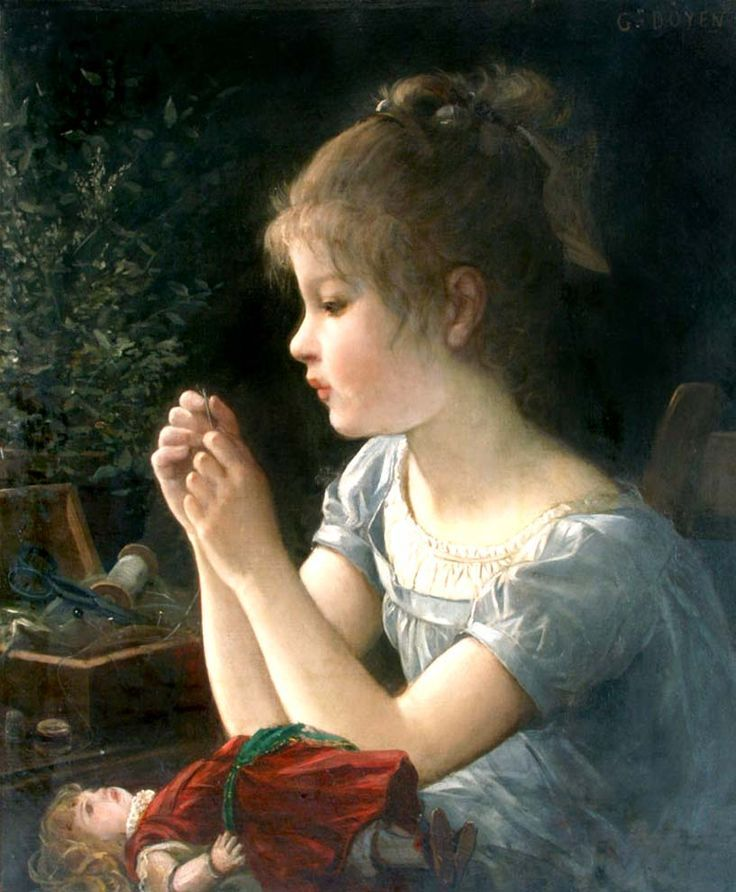
- Little girl with her doll
- Born: Gustave Doyen; 1836; Festieux, France
- Died: 1923 (aged 86–87); Fontainebleau
- Education: William Bouguereau
- Known for: Painting

Gustave Doyen (1836 in Festieux – 1923 in Fontainebleau) was a French painter working during 19th and 20th centuries in France. He was educated at St Edmund's College in Douai and trained by William Bouguereau. He exhibited his paintings in the Salon de Paris.

== Paintings ==
- The stopped reading
- Jealousy
- The walk
- Contemplation
- Young girl carrying a pitcher
- Joan of Arc
- The bather
- Little girl with her doll

== Gallery ==
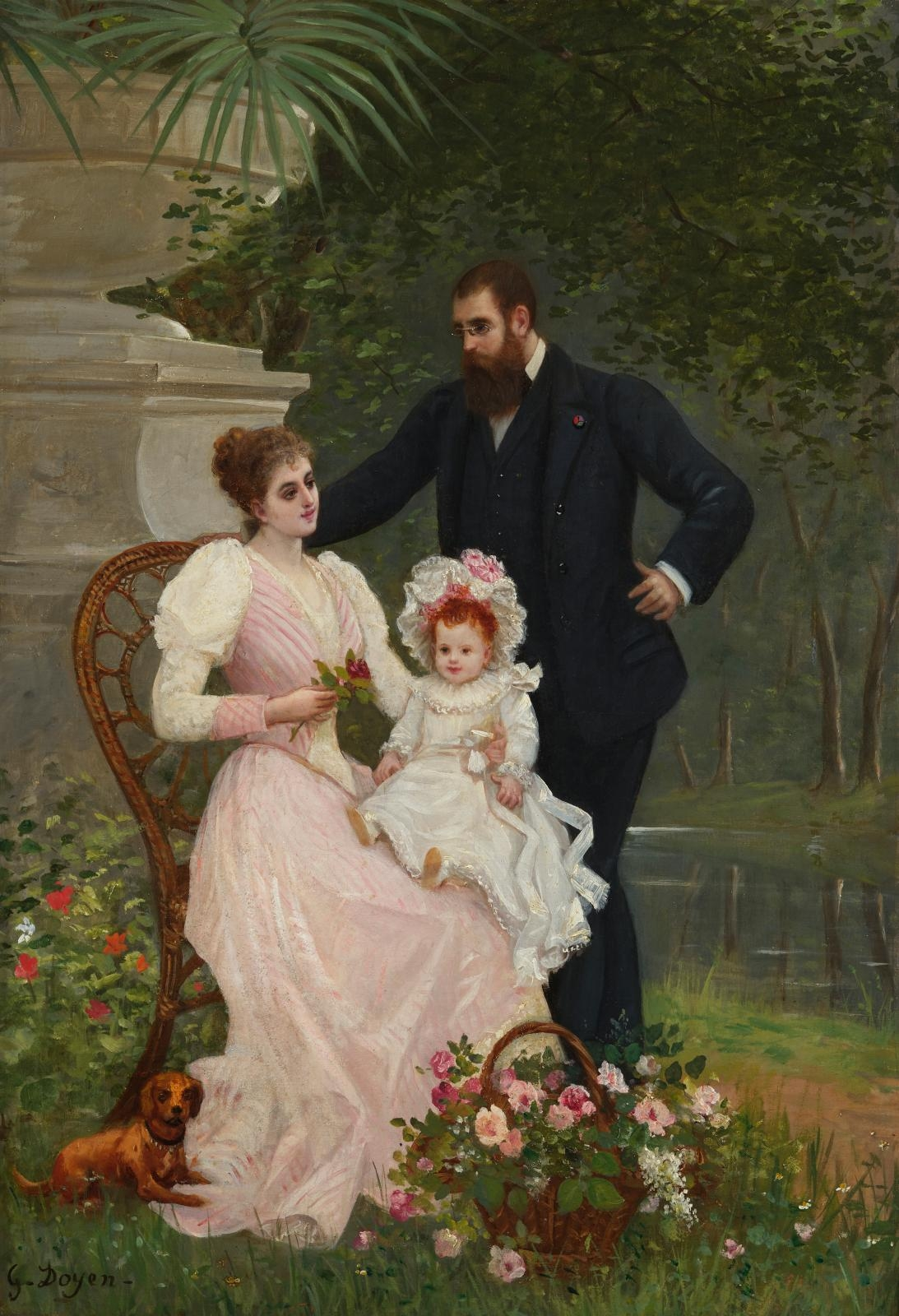
Family portrait

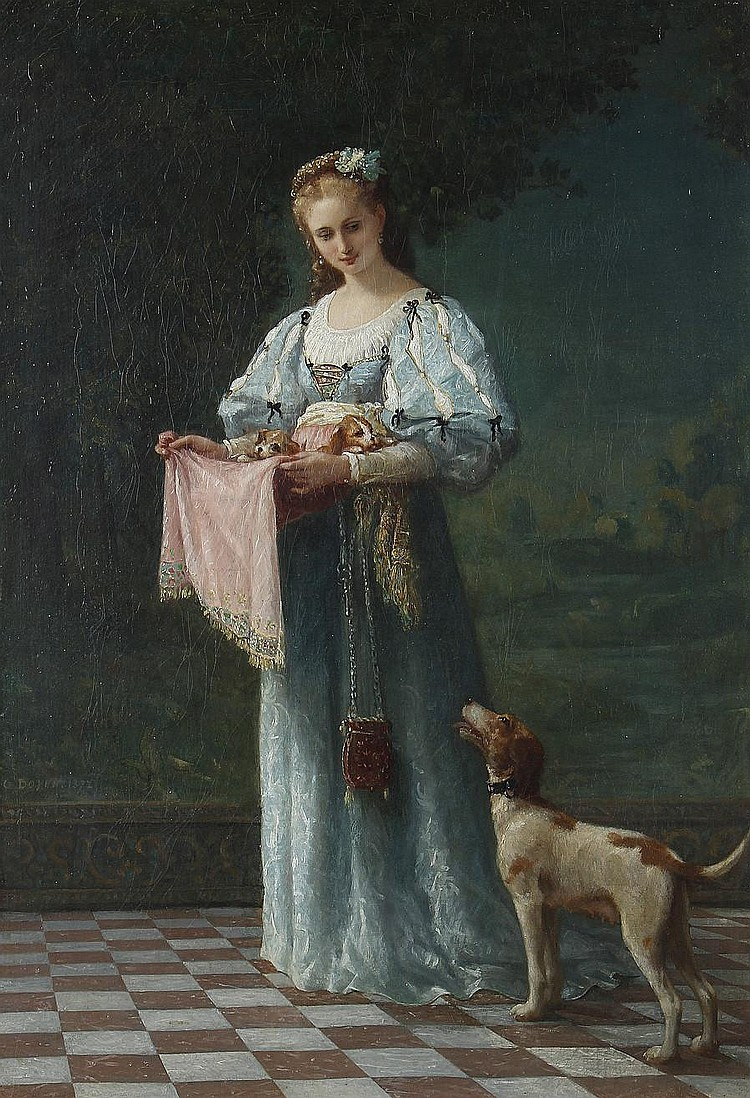
The New Litter, 1872

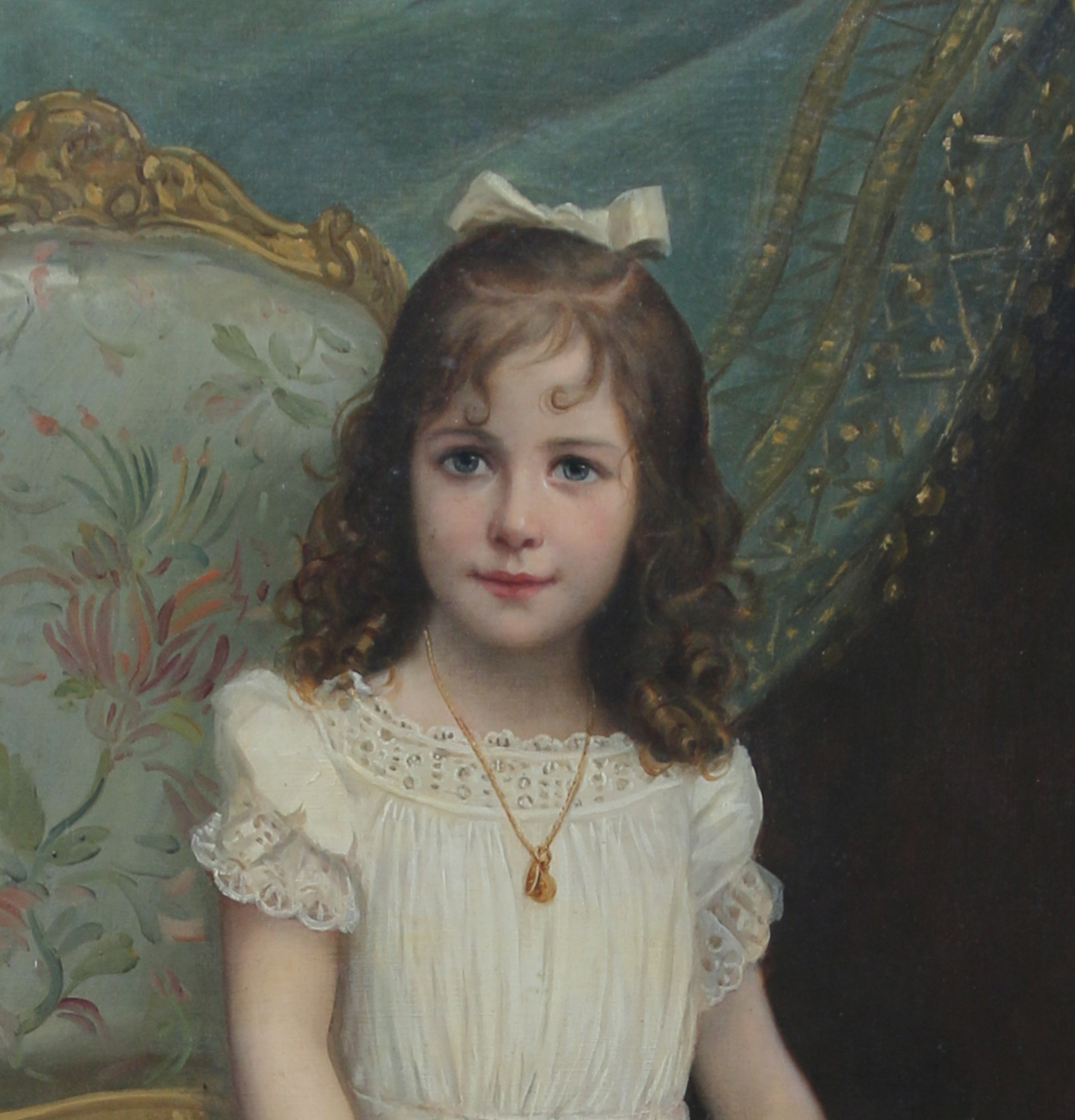
Portrait of Gabrielle Dauvilliers

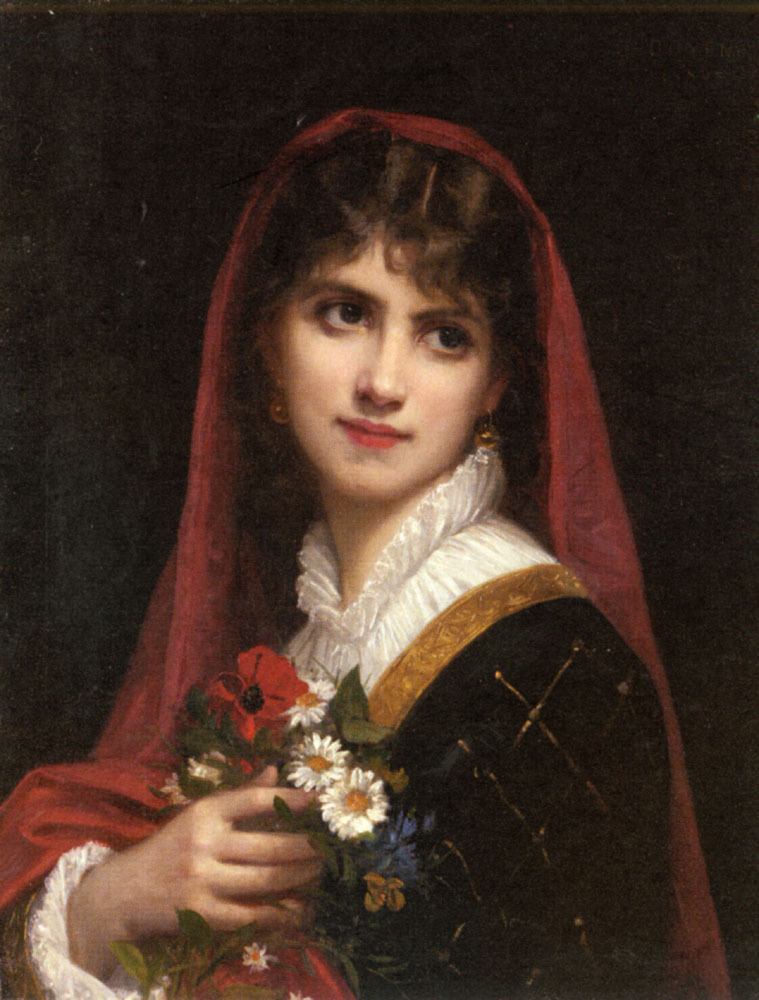
Young beauty wearing a red veil

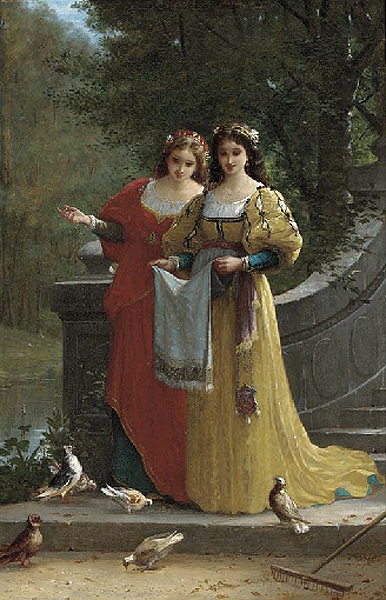
Two women feeding the birds

== Bibliography ==
- E. Bénézit, Dictionnaire critique et documentaire des peintres, sculpteurs, dessinateurs et graveurs, t. 3, Gründ, Évreux 1976.
