= Douai Abbey =

Coordinates: 51.409185°N 1.171846°W

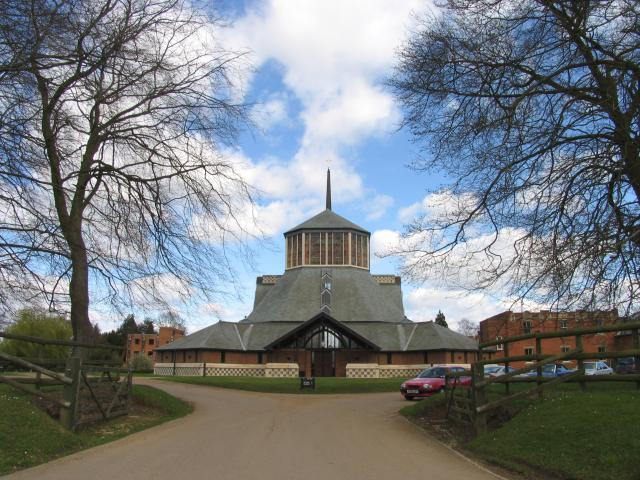

- Location within Berkshire
- OS grid reference: SU 57704 68214
- Location: Woolhampton, Berkshire
- Country: England
- Denomination: Roman Catholic
- Website: www.douaiabbey.org.uk

History
- Status: Monastery
- Founded: 1615
- Founder: Dom Gabriel Gifford
- Dedication: St Edmund the Martyr
- Dedicated: 1933
- Events: 1615 Founded in Paris 1818 Moved to Douai 1903 Moved to Woolhampton

Architecture
- Functional status: Active
- Heritage designation: Grade II*
- Designated: 10 November 1980
- Architect: J Arnold Crush
- Style: Gothic Revival
- Groundbreaking: 1903
- Completed: 1993

Administration
- Province: Southwark
- Diocese: Portsmouth
- Deanery: West Berkshire

Clergy
- Bishop: Rt Rev Philip Egan
- Abbot: Rt Rev Paul Gunter OSB

Douai Abbey is a Benedictine Abbey at Upper Woolhampton, near Thatcham, in the English county of Berkshire, situated within the Roman Catholic Diocese of Portsmouth. Monks from the monastery of St. Edmund's, in Douai, France, came to Woolhampton in 1903 when the community left France as a result of anti-clerical legislation. The abbey church is listed Grade II* on the National Heritage List for England.

== History ==
The community of St. Edmund was formed in Paris in 1615 by Dom Gabriel Gifford, later Archbishop of Rheims and primate of France. With his backing the community flourished. Expelled from Paris during the Revolution, the community took over the vacant buildings of the community of St Gregory's in Douai in 1818.

Amid the political upheavals caused by the Dreyfus affair around the turn of the 19th century, the French prime minister Waldeck-Rousseau introduced an anti-clerical Law of Associations (1901) that "severely curbed the influence of religious orders in France". This led to the community being given the minor seminary of St Mary in Woolhampton by Bishop Cahill of Portsmouth, moving from Douai to Woolhampton in 1903. The abbey church was opened in 1933 but only completed in 1993 due to financial constraints.

The monastery was greatly expanded in the 1960s with the building of the new monastery designed by Sir Frederick Gibberd. The abbey had in its charge Douai School until the latter's closure in 1999. In 2005, two monks returned to Douai, France to form a community there and restore the historic links to English monasticism.

== Jacobitism ==
The monastery and its community have traditionally maintained strong links to the Stuart dynasty and the Jacobite cause; with King James II of England buried in the monastery in Saint-Germain-en-Laye, near Paris (the community's home from the early 17th century till the French Revolution and the community's relocation to Douai in northern France), members of the House of Wittelsbach (present pretenders to the Jacobite claim) being educated at the community's former boarding school (at their present location), and the immediate past abbot, Geoffrey Scott OSB, is a member of the Jacobite Society.

== Present ==
In July 2014 a monk was ordained priest, the first priestly ordination since 2007. As of 2020, the community consisted of 23 monks. The monks serve in parishes across five dioceses. The patron of the monastery is St Edmund King and Martyr, whose feast day is 20 November.

== Music ==
The Abbey Church houses two pipe organs, a smaller organ of 1978 in an Italian style by Tamburini and a larger organ of 1994 in a modernised English Classical style by Kenneth Tickell.

Because it contains these organs, and especially because of its unique and reverberant acoustics, the Abbey Church is frequently used as a recording location by musical performers. Commercial albums recorded there include:

- Carlo Gesualdo - Tenebrae by The Hilliard Ensemble (March 1990).
- Pierre de la Rue - Missa Cum Iocunditate, Motets by The Hilliard Ensemble (1997).
- The Old Hall Manuscript by The Hilliard Ensemble (1990).
- Cristobal de Morales - Mass For The Feast Of St. Isidore Of Seville by the Gabrieli Consort & Players, directed by Paul McCreesh (2003).
- A New Venetian Coronation 1595 by the Gabrieli Consort & Players, directed by Paul McCreesh (2012).
- Handel Organ Concertos by Baroque Belles and David Willcocks (1999).
- MacMillan And His British Contemporaries by the choir of New College, Oxford (2006).
- Rutter: Requiem by the choir of Clare College, Cambridge (2003).

== List of Abbots ==
- 1900–1904: Lawrence Larkin
- 1904–1905: Ambrose Bamford
- 1905–1913: Stanislaus Taylor
- 1913–1921: David Hurley
- 1921–1929: Edmund Kelly
- 1929–1969: Sylvester Mooney
- 1969–1989: Gregory Freeman
- 1989–1990: Leonard Vickers
- 1990–1998: Finbar Kealy
- 1998–2022: Geoffrey Scott
- 2022–present: Paul Gunter

== Gallery ==
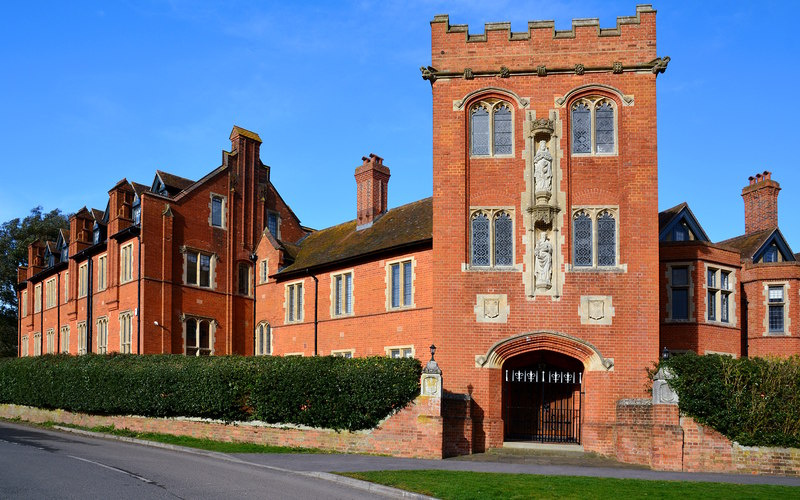
Abbey

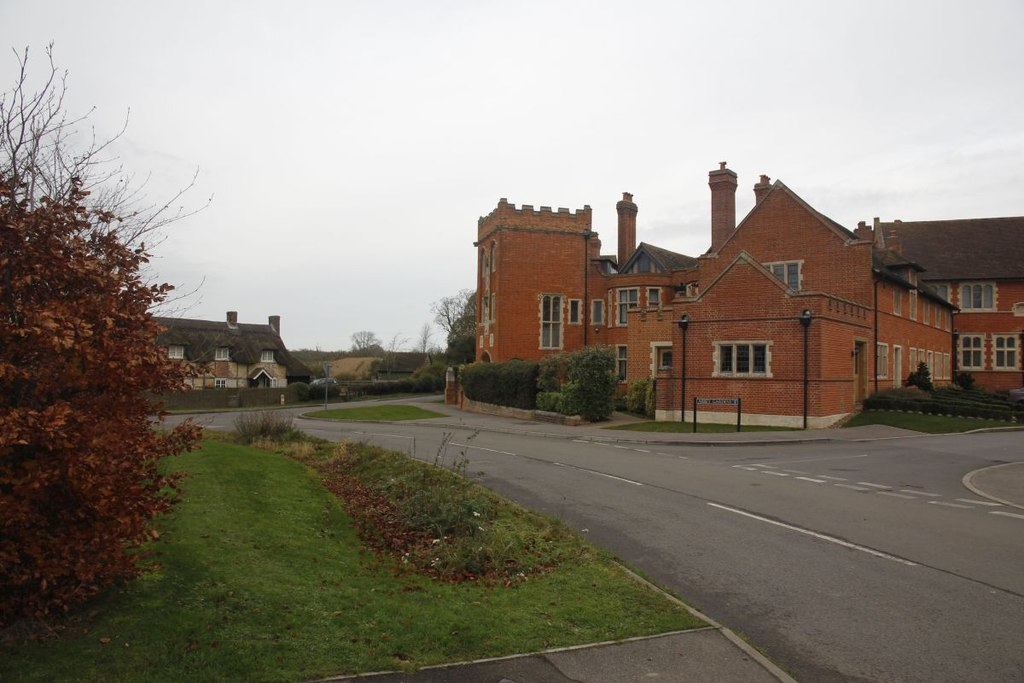
Abbey and school

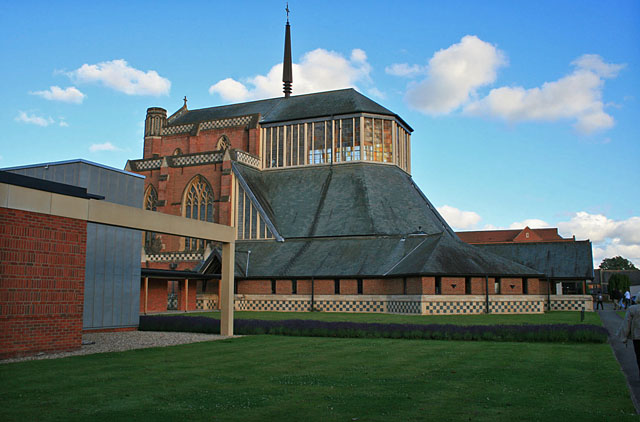
Abbey church

== See also ==
- Douai, France
- Douai School
- English College, Douai
- English Benedictine Congregation
