= Hey, Mr. Producer! (album) =

Live album by Various artists
- Released: October 1998
- Recorded: 7–8 June 1998
- Studios: The Lyceum Theatre, London
- Genre: Show tunes
- Label: First Night Records

Julie Andrews chronology
Doctor Dolittle (1998)	Hey, Mr. Producer! (1998)	My Favourite Broadway: The Leading Ladies (1999)

Hey, Mr. Producer! is a double live album released in October 1998 by First Night Records. The album documents a concert held on June 7 and 8, 1998, at the Lyceum Theatre in London. The performances were presented as a tribute to producer Cameron Mackintosh and served as a benefit for the Royal National Institute of Blind People (RNIB) and the Combined Theatrical Charities. The event featured artists performing musical numbers from various productions associated with Mackintosh's career. Proceeds from international sales of video and compact disc (CD) recordings are also donated to both organizations.

== Background and content ==
The album includes 57 tracks compiled from the two-night event. The performances were selected from a wide variety of musicals produced or co-produced by Mackintosh, including Les Misérables, Cats, The Phantom of the Opera, Miss Saigon, Oliver!, Martin Guerre, My Fair Lady, Little Shop of Horrors, Follies, Five Guys Named Moe and others. The album reflects Mackintosh's extensive influence in the musical theatre industry through recordings of key songs and ensemble performances from these works. The digital download includes seven bonus tracks from the original studio recording, including Patti LuPone's "As Long as He Needs Me" from Oliver!.

A number of prominent performers appear on the recording, including Julie Andrews, Judi Dench, Bernadette Peters, Michael Ball, Maria Friedman, Lea Salonga, Colm Wilkinson, Jonathan Pryce, and Elaine Paige, among others. Each artist performed numbers from shows in which they had been involved or that were significant in Mackintosh's production history. Julie Andrews also served as the host of the event, introducing acts and participating in the finale.

A notable track on the album is "Dueling Pianos" which features Stephen Sondheim and Andrew Lloyd Webber performing excerpts of their own compositions in a medley created specifically for the occasion. The two composers alternated between pieces such as "Send In the Clowns" and "The Music of the Night" ending with a rewritten version of "Send in the Clowns" that referenced Mackintosh directly. The recording also includes lesser-known works like songs from Just So and Moby Dick! The Musical, broadening the scope beyond Mackintosh's most commercially successful productions.

The album does not contain the full program of the live performance. According to coverage by The Hour, the stage event lasted approximately three and a half hours and featured additional numbers not included on the CD release. Some of these performances involved full casts, complex staging, or visual components that could not be translated into the audio format. The tracklist focuses primarily on solo and duet performances that maintain their coherence in a purely musical format.

== Reception ==
Professional ratings
Review scores
Source	Rating
AllMusic	2.5/5 stars

=== Critical ===
David A. Rosenberg of The Hour wrote that "much of the excitement [of the event] is captured on the discs".

=== Commercial ===
From a commercial standpoint, the album debuted on the UK Albums Chart on 24 October 1998, entering at position No. 42. In the subsequent week, dated 31 October 1998, it registered a decline of ten positions, falling to No. 52. By its third week on the chart, dated 7 November 1998, the album had dropped further to No. 79, which marked its final appearance on the ranking.

== Track listing ==
Disc One
No.	Title	Writer(s)	Performer(s)	Length
1.	"We Said We Wouldn't Look Back"	Julian Slade	The City Of London Philharmonic
2.	"Cats Overture"	Andrew Lloyd Webber	The City Of London Philharmonic
3.	"Food Glorious Food"	Lionel Bart	The City Of London Philharmonic
4.	"Wouldn't It Be Loverly?"	Alan Jay Lerner, Frederick Loewe	Liz Robertson
5.	"Quit Professor Higgins"	A. J. Lerner, F. Loewe	The City Of London Philharmonic
6.	"The Rain in Spain"	A. J. Lerner, F. Loewe	Jonathan Pryce, Liz Robertson & Donald Sinden
7.	"Get Me to the Church on Time"	A. J. Lerner, F. Loewe	Peter Bayliss
8.	"I've Grown Accustomed to Her Face"	A. J. Lerner, F. Loewe	Jonathan Pryce & Liz Robertson
9.	"Introduction"		Julie Andrews
10.	"One Two Three"	John Dempsey, Dana P. Rowe	John Barrowman
11.	"Little Shop Of Horrors"	Howard Ashman, Alan Menken	Wendy Mae Brown, Dawn Hope & Femi Taylor
12.	"Somewhere That's Green"	H. Ashman, A. Menken	Ellen Greene
13.	"Suddenly Seymour"	H. Ashman, A. Menken	Ellen Greene & Teddy Kempner
14.	"Day by Day"	Stephen Schwartz	The City Of London Philharmonic
15.	"I Get a Kick Out of You"	Cole Porter	Marion Montgomery & Laurie Holloway
16.	"Variations"	Andrew Lloyd Webber	Julian Lloyd Webber
17.	"Unexpected Song"	Don Black, Richard Maltby Jr., A. L. Webber	Bernadette Peters
18.	"Nicer in Nice"	Sandy Wilson	Jasna Ivir
19.	"I Love a Lassie"	Harry Lauder	Jimmy Logan & ScottishPower Pipe Band
20.	"Five Guys Named Moe"	Jerry Bresler, Larry Wynn, Louis Jordan	Kevyn Beckett, Trent Kendall, Monroe Kent III, Jason Pennycooke, Clarke Peters & Richard D. Sharp
21.	"Is You Is or Is You Ain't My Baby"	J. Bresler, L. Wynn, L. Jordan	Kevyn Beckett, Trent Kendall, Monroe Kent III, Jason Pennycooke, Clarke Peters & Richard D. Sharp
22.	"Pick a Pocket"	Lionel Bart	Russ Abbot
23.	"As Long as He Needs Me"	L. Bart	Sonia Swaby
24.	"Introduction"		Julie Andrews
25.	"I'm Martin Guerre"	Alain Boublil, Stephen Clark, Claude-Michel Schönberg	David Campbell
26.	"How Many Tears?"	A. Boublil, S. Clark, C.-M. Schönberg	Maria Friedman
27.	"The Heat Is On In Saigon"	A. Boublil, S. Clark, C.-M. Schönberg	David Campbell & Lea Salonga
28.	"The Wedding"	A. Boublil, S. Clark, C.-M. Schönberg	The City Of London Philharmonic
29.	"Last Night of The World"	A. Boublil, S. Clark, C.-M. Schönberg	David Campbell & Lea Salonga
30.	"This is the Hour"	A. Boublil, S. Clark, C.-M. Schönberg	The City Of London Philharmonic
31.	"American Dream"	A. Boublil, S. Clark, C.-M. Schönberg	Jonathan Pryce

Disc Two
No.	Title	Writer(s)	Performer(s)	Length
1.	"The Phantom of the Opera"	Charles Hart, Richard Stilgoe	Lisa Vroman & Colm Wilkinson
2.	"The Music of the Night"	Charles Hart, Richard Stilgoe	Colm Wilkinson
3.	"Broadway Baby"	Stephen Sondheim	Maria Friedman, Julia McKenzie & Bernadette Peters
4.	"Oh, What a Beautiful Mornin'"	Oscar Hammerstein II	Hugh Jackman
5.	"Carousel Waltz/Ballet"	Oscar Hammerstein II	Vadim Bondar & Dana Stackpole
6.	"Porch Scene"	Oscar Hammerstein II	Hal Fowler, Joanna Riding, Dana Stackpole & Barbara King
7.	"You'll Never Walk Alone"	Oscar Hammerstein II	Joanna Riding
8.	"Introduction"		Ned Sherrin
9.	"Side by Side"	S. Sondheim	David Kernan, Millicent Martin & Julia McKenzie
10.	"You Could Drive A Person Crazy"	S. Sondheim	Maria Friedman, Ruthie Henshall, Millicent Martin & Lea Salonga
11.	"Send In the Clowns"	S. Sondheim	Judi Dench
12.	"Losing My Mind"	S. Sondheim	Michael Ball
13.	"Being Alive"	S. Sondheim	Bernadette Peters
14.	"You've Gotta Have A Gimmick"	S. Sondheim	Ruthie Henshall, Julia McKenzie & Bernadette Peters
15.	"Introduction"		S. Sondheim
16.	"Duelling Pianos"	S. Sondheim	Stephen Sondheim & Andrew Lloyd Webber
17.	"Poisoning Pigeons in the Park"	Tom Lehrer	Tom Lehrer
18.	"Jellicle Songs"	T. S. Eliot, Trevor Nunn	Brian Blessed & Paul Nicholas
19.	"Memory"	T. S. Eliot, Trevor Nunn	Elaine Paige
20.	"At the End of the Day"	Alain Boublil, Herbert Kretzmer	The City Of London Philharmonic
21.	"Stars"	A. Boublil, H. Kretzmer	Philip Quast
22.	"Do You Hear the People Sing?"	A. Boublil, H. Kretzmer	Hal Fowler
23.	"On My Own"	A. Boublil, H. Kretzmer	Lea Salonga
24.	"Bring Him Home"	A. Boublil, H. Kretzmer	Colm Wilkinson
25.	"One Day More"	A. Boublil, H. Kretzmer	Colm Wilkinson, Michael Ball, Hal Fowler, Ruthie Henshall, Tammi Jacobs, Teddy Kempner, Philip Quast, Lea Salonga & Marie Zamora
26.	"We Said We Wouldn't Look Back"	Dorothy Reynolds	Cameron Mackintosh

== Personnel ==
Credits adapted from the liner notes of Hey, Mr. Producer! record.

- Orchestrations by David Cullen, John Cameron, Jonathan Tunick, and William David Brohn
- Conducted by Martin Koch
- Coordination by John Craig
- Assistant engineering by Meredith Leung
- Engineered and mixed by David Hunt
- Liner notes by Cameron Mackintosh and Melvyn Bragg
- Performed by The City of London Philharmonic
- Devised by Cameron Mackintosh and Julia McKenzie
- Photography by Michael Le Poer Trench
- Programming by André Horstmann
- Sound design by Andrew Bruce
- Musical supervision by David Caddick and Martin Koch

== Charts ==
Weekly chart performance for Hey, Mr. Producer!
Chart (1998)	Peak position
UK Albums (Official Charts)	42
