= Doctor Dolittle (cast recording) =

Cast recording by Various artists
- Released: 1998
- Recorded: 1998
- Genre: Show tune
- Label: First Night Records

Julie Andrews chronology
The Best of Julie Andrews: Thoroughly Modern Julie (1996)	Doctor Dolittle (1998)	Hey, Mr. Producer! (1998)

Doctor Dolittle (official title including subtitle: Doctor Dolittle — World Premiere London Cast Recording) is the official cast album of the 1998 London stage musical Doctor Dolittle, composed by Leslie Bricusse, released by First Night Records the same year. It includes ensemble numbers, solo ballads, and transitional musical pieces, capturing the structural flow of the stage musical. Some musical sections were recorded in full even though they would be edited or re-staged during the show's run. No live audience is present on the recording, and all material was captured under controlled studio conditions for clarity and balance.

The musical opened at the Hammersmith Apollo on 14 July 1998. Prior to the show's official debut, the original cast entered the studio to record the album, under the musical supervision and production of Mike Dixon. The recording was completed before musical director Michael England assumed conducting duties for the live production.

The 1998 original London cast recording was supported by a BBC documentary and a major promotional campaign. Critics described it as an engaging blend of classic musical theatre and modern themes about animal rights, praising "When I Look into Your Eyes" while noting that songs like "Talk to the Animals" was less impactful.

== Background ==
Doctor Dolittle premiered at the Hammersmith Apollo on 14 July 1998 and closed on 26 June 1999. The stage musical production costs about £4m to stage, and the main attraction was a menagerie of 92 electronic animals created by Jim Henson's Creature Shop.

== Production and recording ==
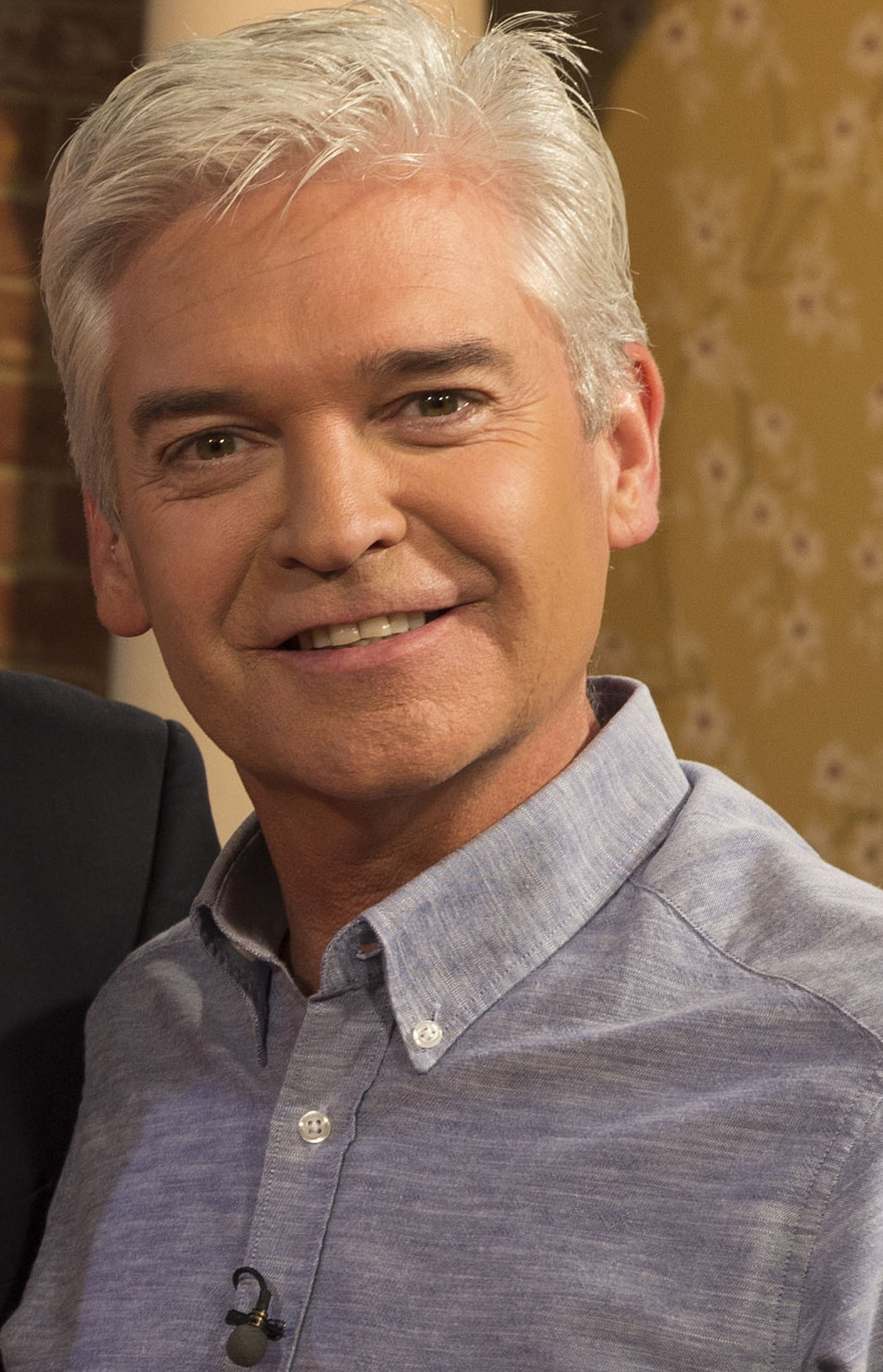
Philip Schofield provided lead vocals for the album.

The album was produced and musically supervised by Mike Dixon. Recording sessions were conducted prior to the show's transfer to musical director Michael England and took place in conjunction with the rehearsal period of the stage production.

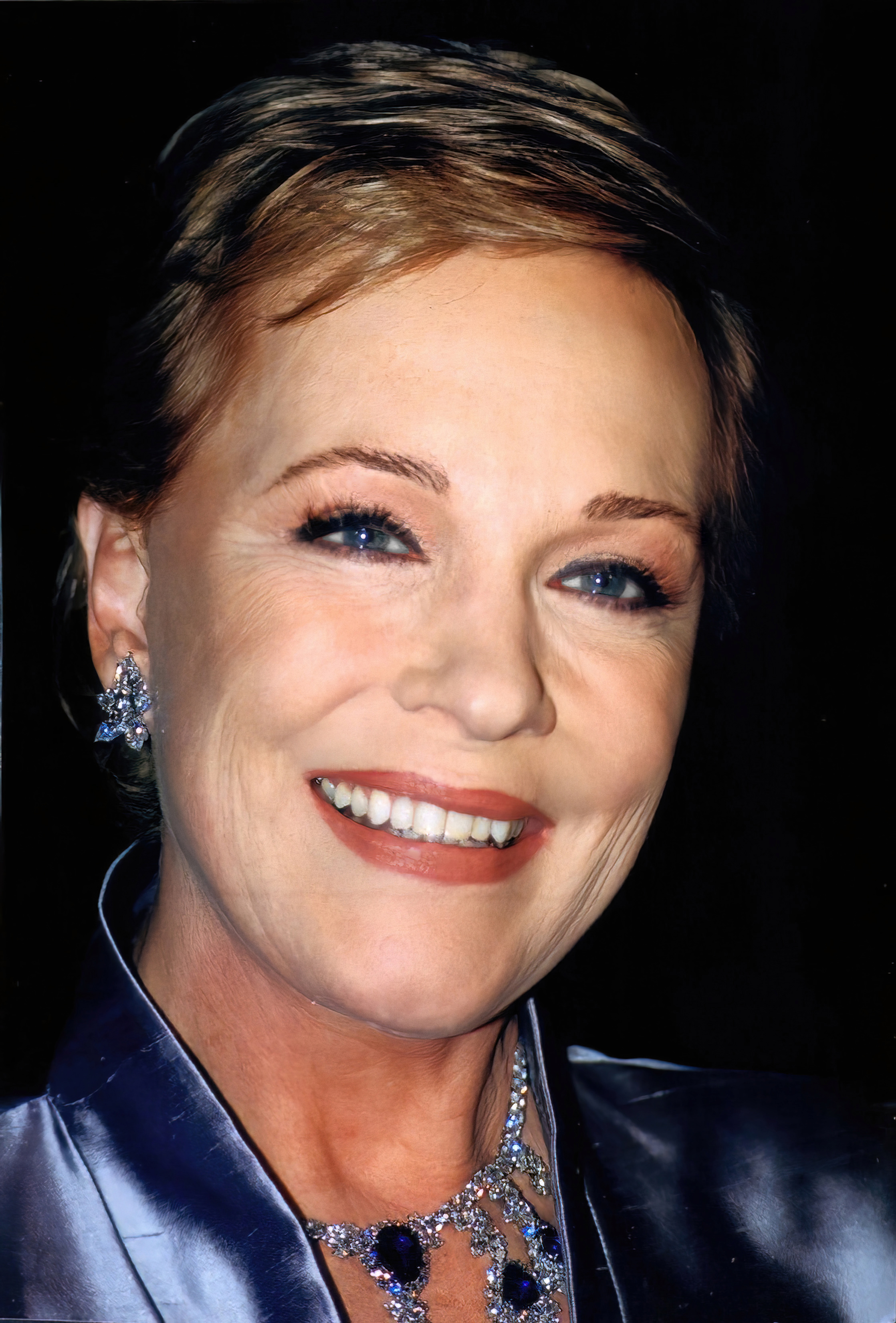
Julie Andrews's voice was added to the cast recording at the Pierce Rooms.

Unlike typical cast albums recorded in isolation, this recording involved coordination between musical performance and technical staging design. The recording sessions utilized a control space within the theatre building—a repurposed technical room referred to as the "Pierce Rooms"—which allowed full access to recording equipment while remaining physically close to the stage environment. This permitted continuity between the stage performance practices and the studio sessions.

The cast recording documents the orchestrations created specifically for the West End production. These orchestrations integrated new motifs and themes based on material previously developed by Bricusse. Musical material was written and arranged with the interaction between live vocals and pre-recorded puppet voices in mind. The recording was completed before the show's official press opening at the Hammersmith Apollo.

The album includes the full principal score, with lead vocals performed by Phillip Schofield (Doctor Dolittle), Sarah Jane Hassell (Emma Fairfax), and Bryan Smyth (Matthew Muggins). Julie Andrews recorded her dialogue and vocals for the character Polynesia, the parrot, separately from the rest of the cast, in sessions held at Angel Recording Studios in London. The play marks Andrews' first appearance - albeit in voice only - on a British stage for 40 years. Andrews recorded the song "Talk to the Animals" using an arrangement specifically adapted to her vocal capabilities following the surgery that had affected her range and projection. Richard Stirling, author of Julie Andrews: An Intimate Biography, wrote that Andrew's contribution was more akin to vocal acting than conventional singing, reflecting the limitations of her vocal range following surgery.

== Release and promotion ==
The recording was released by First Night Records in 1998 under catalog number CASTCD 68.

A documentary about the making of the musical and the production of the cast album was screened by the BBC. Additionally, an extensive advertising campaign was carried out to boost the sales of the compact disc (CD). A promo single titled A Selection from Doctor Dolittle with four songs ("Talk to the Animals", "Beautiful Things", "After Today" and "When I Look in Your Eyes" was sent to radio stations.

== Critical reception ==
Professional ratings
Review scores
Source	Rating
The Des Moines Register	4/5 stars

In his review for the Des Moines Register, Jeffrey Bruney reflected on the 1998 original London cast recording of Doctor Dolittle, and acknowledged that while the show underwent considerable adaptation for its American stage transfer, the recording still offered valuable insights. He described it as an engaging mix of classic musical theatre—evoking comparisons to My Fair Lady—and a more contemporary, politically charged narrative centered on animal rights. Although the well-known number "Talk to the Animals" didn't quite deliver the expected impact, Bruney highlighted other standout moments, particularly the "emotionally resonant" "When I Look into Your Eyes".

== Track listing ==
Doctor Dolittle (World Premiere London Cast Recording)
No.	Title	Writer(s)	Performer(s)	Length
1.	"Overture"	Leslie Bricusse	Orchestra	1:45
2.	"My Friend The Doctor"	L. Bricusse	Matthew, Tommy & The Company	4:41
3.	"The Vegetarian"	L. Bricusse	Dolittle	3:03
4.	"Talk to the Animals"	L. Bricusse	Dolittle	3:23
5.	"Doctor Dolittle"	L. Bricusse	Matthew, Tommy & The Animals	4:25
6.	"You're Impossible"	L. Bricusse	Emma & Dolittle	2:29
7.	"I've Never Seen Anything Like It"	L. Bricusse	Stubbins & The Company	7:03
8.	"Beautiful Things"	L. Bricusse	Dolittle	3:16
9.	"When I Look Into Your Eyes"	L. Bricusse	Dolittle	3:27
10.	"Like Animals"	L. Bricusse	Dolittle & Emma	4:59
11.	"After Today"	L. Bricusse	Matthew	2:28
12.	"Fabulous Places"	L. Bricusse	Emma, Dolittle, Tommy & Matthew	4:26
13.	"Where Are The Words?"	L. Bricusse	Dolittle & Matthew	3:35
14.	"The Storm"	L. Bricusse	Instrumental	1:27
15.	"I Think I Like You"	L. Bricusse	Emma & Dolittle	4:33
16.	"Save The Animals"	L. Bricusse	Straight Arrow & Company	3:07
17.	"Entrance of Jean-Claude"	L. Bricusse	Stubbins & the Seal	1:08
18.	"Something In Your Smile"	L. Bricusse	Bello	2:24
19.	"My Friend The Doctor (Reprise)"	L. Bricusse	Straight Arrow	1:10
20.	"The Voice Of Protest"	L. Bricusse	Emma & the Company	3:12
21.	"Finale: I've Never Seen Anything Like It (Reprise) / My Friend The Doctor (Reprise)"	L. Bricusse	The Company	2:10
22.	"Talk To The Animals (Reprise)"	L. Bricusse	The Company	0:42
Total length:				68:53

== Personnel ==
Adapted from the album's liner notes.

Cast

- Dr. John Dolittle – Phillip Schofield
- Emma Fairfax – Sarah Jane Hassell
- Matthew Mugg – Bryan Smyth
- General Bellowes – Peter Cellier
- Albert Blossom – John Rawnsley
- Tommy Stubbins – James Paul Bradley
- Straight Arrow – Peter Gallagher
- The Voice of Polynesia – Julie Andrews

Production

- Produced and recorded by Mike Dixon
- Orchestrally Produced by Bill Occleshaw
- Arranged by (Vocal, Dance and Original Musical Arrangements) Mike Dixon
- Music and lyrics by Leslie Bricusse
- Music Director – Michael England
- Keyboards, Music Director (Assistant) – Corin Buckeridge
- Directed by (Resident Director) Wayne Fowkes
- Contractor (Casting Director) – Anne Vosser
- Coordinator – John Craig
- Engineer – David Hunt
- Engineer (Assistant) – Meredith Leung
- Programmed by André Horstmann
- Programmed by (Keyboard) Ian Terry
- Management (Company Manager) by Michael Mansfield

Musicians

- Conductor – Michael England
- Bass – Ben Groenevelt
- Bassoon – Tim Mallett
- Cello – David Bucknall
- Clarinet – Dick Ihnatowicz
- Drums – Tim Goodyer
- Flute – Chris Harding
- Harp – Sharron Griffiths
- Horn – Stephan Smoktunowicz
- Keyboards – Ian Terry, Phil Hawkes
- Oboe – Nicki Woods
- Percussion – Joff Morgan
- Trombone – Richard Henry
- Trumpet – John Barclay
- Viola – Nigel Rowlands
- Violin – Dai Emanuel, Roz Lishak

Design

- Design – Dewynters Plc London
- Photography by (Production) – Michael Le Poer Trench
- Photography by (Additional) – Gavan Goulder
- Liner Notes – Leslie Bricusse
