= Michael England =

English cricketer

Personal information
- Full name: Richard Michael England
- Born: 23 August 1918; Midgham, Berkshire, England
- Died: 25 October 2007 (aged 89); Woolhampton, Berkshire, England
- Batting: Right-handed
- Role: Wicket-keeper

Domestic team information
- Years: Team
- 1938–1939: Oxford University
- 1936–1939: Berkshire

Career statistics
Competition	First-class
Matches	2
Runs scored	59
Batting average	29.50
100s/50s	–/–
Top score	43*
Balls bowled	–
Wickets	–
Bowling average	–
5 wickets in innings	–
10 wickets in match	–
Best bowling	–
Catches/stumpings	4/–
- Source: Cricinfo, 23 November 2011

Richard Michael England (23 August 1918 – 25 October 2007) was an English cricketer. England was a right-handed batsman who fielded as a wicket-keeper.

== Biography ==
Born at Midgham, Berkshire, England, was educated at Eton College, where he was in the Eton XI in 1936 and 1937. It was in 1936 that he made his debut for Berkshire in the Minor Counties Championship against Hertfordshire, though his schooling commitments limited him to one appearance each in 1936 and 1937. He later attended Magdalen College, Oxford, while studying there he made his first-class debut for Oxford University Cricket Club against Leicestershire in 1938. In this match, he scored 11 runs in Oxford University's first-innings, before being dismissed by William Flamson, while in their second-innings he wasn't required to bat. In Leicestershire's first-innings, he took 2 catches behind the stumps, with the match ending in a draw. He made a second first-class appearance for the university the following season against the Minor Counties. He scored 5 runs in Oxford University's first-innings, before being dismissed by Francis Appleyard, while in their second-innings he scored 43 not out. He also took a further two catches behind the stumps, with the match ending in a Minor Counties victory by 4 wickets. His appearances in the team were limited due to the number of wicket-keepers that were used by Oxford University during this time, such as Robin Whetherly, Hector Jelf, Peter Blagg and Manning Clark.

He continued to play in the Minor Counties Championship for Berkshire during this period, making four appearances in 1938 and two in 1939. He later served during World War II. He died at Woolhampton, Berkshire, on 25 October 2007.
