= Midgham Green =

Hamlet in Berkshire, England

Coordinates: 51.407187°N 1.188647°W

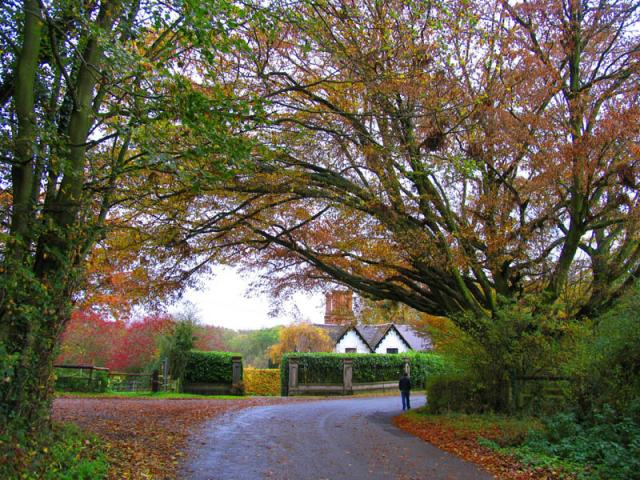
- Midgham Green in the Autumn

- Location within Berkshire
- OS grid reference: SU566678
- Metropolitan borough: West Berkshire
- Metropolitan county: Berkshire
- Region: South East
- Country: England
- Sovereign state: United Kingdom
- Post town: THATCHAM
- Postcode district: RG7
- Dialling code: 0118
- Police: Thames Valley
- Fire: Royal Berkshire
- Ambulance: South Central
- UK Parliament: Berkshire

Midgham Green is a hamlet in the civil parish of Midgham in the English county of Berkshire. The settlement lies near to the A4 road and is located approximately 3 miles (4.8 km) east of Thatcham.
