= David Peacock (theatre administrator) =

British theatre administrator

- Born: 14 April 1924; England
- Died: 11 January 2000 (aged 75); London, England
- Education: Douai School
- Spouse: Georgia Thorndike (m. 1954–1978)
- Children: 7, including Lucy Peacock

David Peacock (14 April 1924 – 11 January 2000), was a British theatre administrator.

== Early life ==
Peacock was born in England in 1924. He was the son of a civil servant father and a French mother. He was educated at the Douai School.

== Career ==
After serving in the British Armed Forces during World War II, he worked as the stage manager at the Royal Opera House. In 1964, he emigrated to Canada and was succeeded by Stella Chitty as general stage manager.

Peacock was director of the production course at the National Theatre School of Canada, and in 1970 became the school's general director. From 1972, he was in charge of the arts division of the Canada Council.

== Personal life ==
In 1951, Peacock married Georgia Thorndike, daughter of the actor and novelist Russell Thorndike and niece of the actress Sybil Thorndike, and they had seven children, including the actress Lucy Peacock. They divorced in 1978, he moved back to England, and remarried.

He died in London in 2000, aged 75.
