= My Favourite Broadway: The Leading Ladies =

Live album by Various artists
- Released: 1999
- Recorded: 28 September 1998
- Genres: Show tune, pop
- Label: TVT Soundtrax

Julie Andrews chronology
Hey, Mr. Producer! (1998)	My Favourite Broadway: The Leading Ladies (1999)	Relative Values (2000)

My Favourite Broadway: The Leading Ladies is a cast live album recorded at Carnegie Hall on September 28, 1998, as part of PBS's Great Performances series. The concert, also filmed for television broadcast, featured sixteen female performers, many associated with Broadway musicals, presenting a collection of show tunes either from roles they originated, revived, or interpreted anew.

== Background and content ==
Hosted by Julie Andrews, who did not sing in the concert, the event My Favourite Broadway: The Leading Ladies was staged on a Monday night, traditionally a dark night for theaters, allowing for the participation of numerous stars. The show was also released in video (VHS/DVD) by Image Entertainment.

Among the featured performers were Karen Ziemba, Bebe Neuwirth, Lea DeLaria, Faith Prince, Priscilla Lopez, Andrea McArdle, Debra Monk, Nell Carter, Dorothy Loudon, Jennifer Holliday, Elaine Stritch, Linda Eder, Audra McDonald, Marin Mazzie, Judy Kuhn, Patti LuPone, and Betty Buckley. Though some of these artists had not originated roles or were not typically billed as leading ladies, the program still showcased a range of musical theater talent. According to the liner notes, Paul Gemignani conducted the American Theater Orchestra for the performance. The live show raised $50,000 for two AIDS charities.

The repertoire included iconic numbers such as "Adelaide's Lament" (Faith Prince), Life Upon The Wicked Stage (Anna Kendrick) "And I Am Telling You I'm Not Going" (Jennifer Holliday), "Tomorrow" (Andrea McArdle), "Everybody's Girl" (Debra Monk), "Fifty Percent" (Dorothy Loudon), and "The Ladies Who Lunch" (Elaine Stritch). Other selections included "Nothing" (Priscilla Lopez), "I Can Cook Too" (Lea DeLaria), and a medley of Andrew Lloyd Webber's hits: "Love Changes Everything" (Audra McDonald), "Unexpected Song" (Mazzie), and "I Don't Know How to Love Him" (Judy Kuhn).

Julie Andrews's introduction emphasized her admiration for legendary Broadway figures such as Mary Martin, Ethel Merman, Gertrude Lawrence, Judy Holliday, and Gwen Verdon. Critics noted that the album did not include appearances by several of Broadway's historically definitive female performers like Gwen Verdon or Angela Lansbury. Additionally, some songs and performances were described as unexpected or unusual entries for a compilation focused on musical comedy's "leading ladies".

== Critical reception ==
Professional ratings
Review scores
Source	Rating
AllMusic	4/5 stars

According to Billboard, the album is "a bold, genre-defying project that showcases the artists' vocal prowess and emotional depth". William Ruhlmann of AllMusic describes the album as "a surprisingly dark and moody album", and comments that it is "hard to imagine anyone from either the pop or classical world embracing this project".

Steven Suskin of Playbill stated that "this album might find a niche market in fans of vocal experimentation or avant-garde music", but also remarked that "mainstream listeners will likely find it inaccessible". Back Stage writes that "though the album's concept is intriguing, the execution may leave some listeners cold".

== Commercial performance ==
The album did not appear on any Billboard charts. As of September 2000, it had sold 20,000 copies according to Nielsen SoundScan. An additional 70,000 units were sold through PBS and other outlets not tracked by SoundScan.

== Track listing ==
No.	Title	Writer(s)	Performer(s)	Length
1.	"Girl Crazy" (From Girl Crazy (Overture))	George Gershwin	The American Theater Orchestra
2.	"Welcome"		Julie Andrews
3.	"Adelaide's Lament" (From Guys & Dolls)	Frank Loesser	Faith Prince
4.	"Nowadays" (From Chicago)	John Kander, Fred Ebb	Karen Ziemba & Bebe Neuwirth
5.	"Nothing" (From A Chorus Line)	Ed Kleban, Marvin Hamlisch	Priscilla Lopez
6.	"I Can Cook Too" (From On The Town)	Betty Comden, Adolph Green, Leonard Bernstein	Lea Delaria
7.	"Look for the Silver Lining / Tomorrow" (From Sally / Annie)	B.G. DeSylva, Charles Strouse, Jerome Kern, Martin Charnin	Andrea McArdle
8.	"Some People" (From Gypsy)	Jule Styne, Stephen Sondheim	Liza Minnelli
9.	"Man Of La Mancha" (From Man Of La Mancha)	Joe Darion, Mitch Leigh	Linda Eder
10.	"The Webber Love Trio: Love Changes Everything / Unexpected Song / I Don't Know How To Love Him" (From Aspects Of Love, Song & Dance and Jesus Christ Superstar)	Andrew Lloyd Webber, Don Black, Charles Hart / Webber, Black / Webber, Tim Rice	Audra McDonald / Marin Mazzie / Judy Kuhn
11.	"Everybody's Girl" (From Steel Pier)	Kander / Ebb	Debra Monk
12.	"Mean To Me" (From Ain't Misbehavin')	Fred E. Ahlert, Roy Turk	Nell Carter featuring Luther Henderson
13.	"Fifty Percent" (From Ballroom)	Alan & Marilyn Bergman, Billy Goldenberg	Dorothy Loudon
14.	"And I'm Telling You" (From Dreamgirls)	Henry Krieger, Tom Eyen	Jennifer Holliday
15.	"The Ladies Who Lunch" (From Company)	Sondheim	Elaine Stritch
16.	"Closing"		Andrews
17.	"One" (From A Chorus Line)	Kleban, Hamlisch	Ensemble

== Personnel ==
Credits adapted from the liner notes of My Favourite Broadway: The Leading Ladies.

- Concepted and produced by Allen Newman, Jeff Rowland, Tony Adams
- Directed by Paul Gemignani
