= Frank Keating (journalist) =

English sports journalist and author

Francis Vincent Keating (4 October 1937 – 25 January 2013) was an English sports journalist and author, who was best known for his regular columns in The Guardian newspaper. Keating was described as "a giant of sports journalism" by journalist Phil Shaw in his obituary for The Independent newspaper.

== Life and career ==
Frank Keating was born to a farming family in Herefordshire, and raised in Gloucestershire. He attended Roman Catholic boarding schools at Belmont Abbey and at Douai School, before joining the Stroud News as a local reporter in 1956. He later worked on various local newspapers in Hereford, Guildford, Bristol, Southern Rhodesia, Gloucester and Slough, before working briefly as a sub-editor for The Guardian in 1963. In 1964, he joined Rediffusion TV as outside broadcasts editor, and in 1968 moved to Thames Television, as special features editor.

In 1970 Keating returned to The Guardian as a sub-editor. By the late 1970s he had gained his own regular column of commentary, interviews and reminiscences, particularly covering cricket, football, rugby union and horse racing. His columns were admired for their "fresh, inventive phraseology", and his "remarkable gift for phrase and observation" and "jaunty, ornate prose". As principal sports columnist, he continued writing the column until late 2012.

Keating wrote several books, including Another Bloody Day in Paradise (1981), about the English cricket team in the West Indies in 1980–81 tour; Long Days, Late Nights, a miscellany of previously published articles in 1984; High, Wide and Handsome, about cricketer Ian Botham; and biographies of Geoffrey Boycott and Graham Gooch. His autobiography, Half-Time Whistle, published in 1992, was shortlisted for the Sports Book of the Year award. In addition to The Guardian, he wrote for other publications including Punch, The Spectator, and the New Statesman, and undertook freelance television work, including a series of sports interviews, Maestro, for the BBC between 1981 and 1985. He was named Sports Journalist of the Year in the 1988 British Press Awards.

== Death ==
He died at a hospice in Hereford, aged 75, on 25 January 2013, after suffering from pneumonia. Twice married, he was survived by his wife Jane, son Paddy and daughter Tess.
