= James Theunissen =

English cricketer (born 1981)

James Theunissen (born 7 December 1981) was an English cricketer. He was a right-handed batsman and a right-arm medium-fast bowler who played for Berkshire. He was born in London and educated at Douai School.

Theunissen represented Berkshire in the Minor Counties Championship for three seasons, and made a single List A appearance for the team, in the 2003 C&G Trophy, against Durham. Batting at number 11, Theunissen scored 16 runs, assisting fellow tailender Tom Lambert to a match-best tenth-wicket partnership of 30 runs.

Theunissen continued to represent Berkshire in the Minor Counties Championship until 2004. In the 2006 Cockspur Cup, he played for North Maidenhead and Falkland. He also played in the 2007 competition.
