= Midgham railway station =

Railway station in the village of Woolhampton, Berkshire, England

Midgham
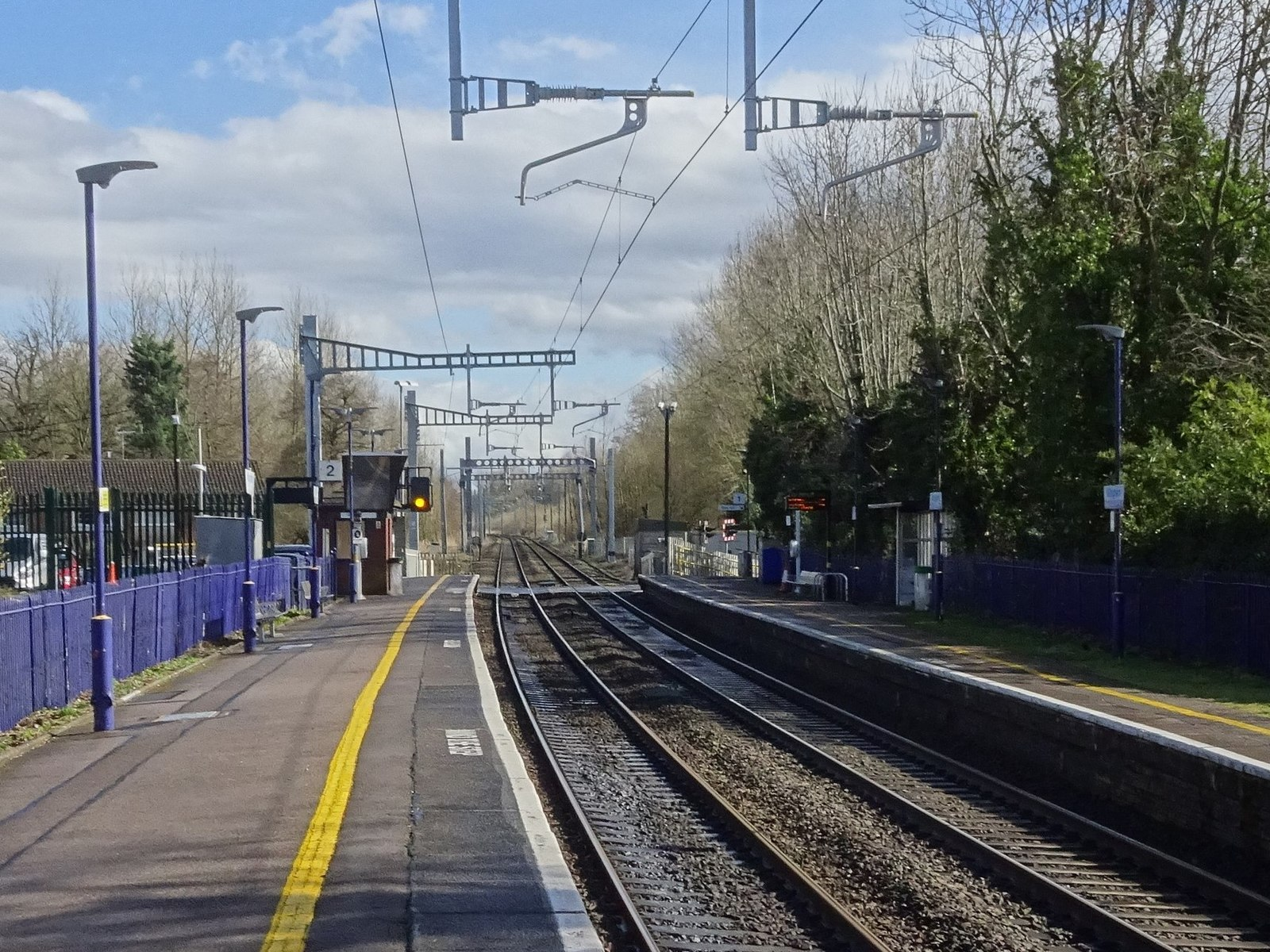
- Midgham station, looking east

General information
- Location: Woolhampton; Midgham, West Berkshire; England
- Coordinates: 51.3961°N 1.1783°W
- Grid reference: SU572666
- Manager: Great Western Railway
- Platforms: 2

Other information
- Station code: MDG
- Classification: DfT category F2

History
- Original company: Berks and Hants Railway
- Pre-grouping: Great Western Railway
- Post-grouping: GWR

Key dates
- 21 December 1847: Opened as "Woolhampton"
- 1 March 1873: Renamed "Midgham"
- 2 November 1964: Renamed "Midgham Halt"
- 5 May 1969: Renamed "Midgham"

Passengers
- 2021/22: ▲24,158
- 2022/23: ▲32,440
- 2023/24: ▲36,230
- 2024/25: ▲44,038
- 2025/26: ▲46,722
Location
Notes
- Passenger statistics from the Office of Rail and Road

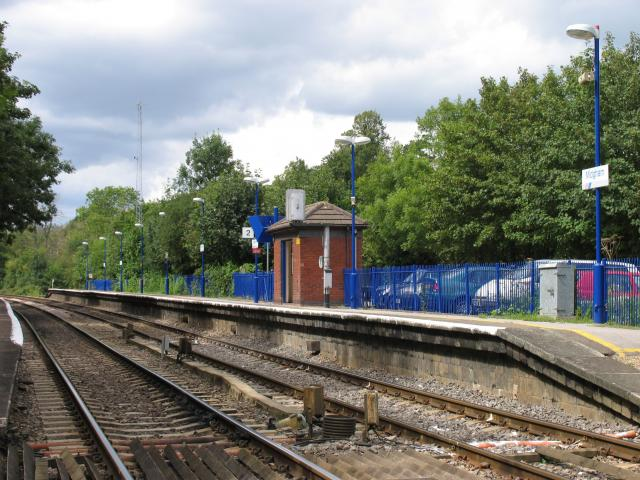
The station before electrification looking to the west from the level crossing

Midgham railway station, formerly known as Woolhampton railway station, is a railway station in the English county of Berkshire. It is located in the village of Woolhampton, but takes its current name from the village of Midgham that lies some 2 miles (3.2 km) away.

The station is on the Reading to Taunton railway line and is 46 miles 59 chains (46.74 miles, 75.22 km) from London Paddington.

== History ==
The line from Reading to Hungerford was planned by the Berks and Hants Railway, and before it was opened, it was absorbed by the Great Western Railway (GWR). The station at Woolhampton was opened with the line on 21 December 1847; it was originally named "Woolhampton" but on 1 March 1873 was renamed "Midgham". The station appeared in a 1943 World War 2 information film for US service personnel titled A Welcome to Britain.

The station was subsequently renamed twice by British Rail: on 2 November 1964 it became "Midgham Halt" but on 5 May 1969 it reverted to "Midgham".

== Description ==
Midgham station is near the centre of Woolhampton village, on an unclassified road just south of its junction with the A4 road. There are two flanking platforms on each side of the double track line. The Reading bound platform has a small shelter and a small car park. The unclassified road crosses the railway line at the eastern end of the station by means of a level crossing, and this crossing also provides the only access between the platforms.

== Services ==
The station is served by local services operated by Great Western Railway from Reading to Newbury. Trains run hourly in both directions on Mondays to Saturdays, and every other hour on a Sunday. Typical journey times are about 12 minutes to Newbury and 20 minutes to Reading. Passengers for London Paddington must normally change trains at Reading (except on Sundays, when services run to and from the capital).

Preceding station	National Rail	Following station
Aldermaston	Great Western Railway; Reading to Newbury; Local Services; Reading to Taunton line	Thatcham

== Incidents ==
On 10 August 1927, the leading bogie of the new King class locomotive, 6003 King George IV, became derailed at speed approaching Midgham. The incident led to the suspension arrangement of the unusual bogie being improved.
