= Lucy Peacock (actress) =

Canadian actress (born 1960)

Lucy Peacock (born October 4, 1960) is a Canadian actress best known for major stage roles at the Stratford Shakespeare Festival in Canada during the course of 30 years.

== Background ==
Peacock was born on October 4, 1960, in England. She is the daughter of theatre administrator David Peacock and Georgia Thorndike, niece of the actress Sybil Thorndike. She graduated from the National Theatre School of Canada in 1983.

== Stratford Shakespeare Festival credits ==
Peacock began her association with the Stratford Shakespeare Festival in 1984 and over the course of 30 years and 60 productions (up to 2023) has played major stage roles in classical theater, including over 30 by William Shakespeare, as well as several musicals.

- Les Belles-Soeurs (2023) by Michel Tremblay (Translation by Esther Jun)-Germaine Lauzon
- Wedding Band (2023) by Alice Childress-Herman's Mother
- The Miser (2022) by Molière (translation by Ranjit Bolt)-Fay
- Richard III (2022) by William Shakespeare-Queen Elizabeth
- Three Tall Women (2021) by Edward Albee-B
- The Merry Wives of Windsor (2019) by William Shakespeare-Mistress Quickly
- Private Lives (2019) by Noël Coward-Amanda
- Twelfth Night (2017) by William Shakespeare — Maria
- The Bacchantes (2017) by Euripides — Agave
- John Gabriel Borkman (2016) by Henrik Ibsen — Gunhild Borkman
- The Beaux' Stratagem (2014) by George Farquhar — Mrs Sullen
- Hay Fever (2014) by Noël Coward — Judith Bliss
- Mary Stuart (2013) by Friedrich Schiller — Mary Stuart
- The Thrill (2013) by Judith Thompson — Elora
- Henry V (2012) by William Shakespeare — Pistol's Wife
- The Merry Wives of Windsor (2011) by William Shakespeare — Mistress Ford
- For the Pleasure of Seeing Her Again (2010) by Michel Tremblay — Nana
- Bartholomew Fair (2009) by Ben Jonson — Ursula the Pigwoman
- The Three Sisters (2009) by Anton Chekhov — Masha
- The Trespassers (2009) by Morris Panych — Roxy
- All's Well That Ends Well (2008) by William Shakespeare — Helena
- Romeo and Juliet (2008) by William Shakespeare — Juliet's Nurse
- The Taming of the Shrew (2008) by William Shakespeare — Grumio
- Othello (2007) by William Shakespeare — Emilia
- The Blonde, the Brunette and the Vengeful Redhead (2006) by Robert Hewett — Monologue
- The Duchess of Malfi (2006) by John Webster — Duchess
- Much Ado About Nothing (2006) by William Shakespeare — Beatrice
- Othello (2005) by William Shakespeare — Desdemona
- Fallen Angels (2005) by Noël Coward — Jane Banbury
- Hello, Dolly! (2005) based on a play by Thornton Wilder — Dolly
- Macbeth (2004) by William Shakespeare — Lady Macbeth
- The King and I (2003) based on a novel by Margaret Landon — Anna Leonowens
- All's Well That Ends Well (2002) by William Shakespeare — Helena
- King Lear (2002) by William Shakespeare — Regan
- The Merchant of Venice (2001) by William Shakespeare — Portia
- Tartuffe (2000) by Molière —Elmire
- As You Like It (2000) by William Shakespeare — Audrey
- Pride and Prejudice (1999) based on a novel by Jane Austen — Elizabeth
- Richard III (1997) by William Shakespeare — Lady Anne
- The Taming of the Shrew (1997) by William Shakespeare — Katherine
- Coriolanus (1997) by William Shakespeare — Valeria
- Othello (1994) by William Shakespeare — Desdemona
- The School for Husbands and The Imaginary Cuckold (1994) by Molière — Lénore
- Twelfth Night (1994) by William Shakespeare — Viola
- A Midsummer Night's Dream (1993) by William Shakespeare — Titania
- The Importance of Being Earnest (1993) by Oscar Wilde — Gwendolyn Fairfax
- The Bacchae (1993) by Euripides — Part of the Chorus
- Uncle Vanya (1992) by Anton Chekov — Yelena
- Love's Labour's Lost (1992) by William Shakespeare — Princess of France
- Phèdre by Jean Racine —Aricia
- Macbeth (1990) by William Shakespeare — Lady Macduff
- As You Like It (1990) by William Shakespeare — Rosalind
- A Midsummer Night's Dream (1989) by William Shakespeare — Titania
- Titus Andronicus (1989) by William Shakespeare — Lavinia
- The Three Sisters (1989) by Anton Chekhov — Masha
- The Comedy of Errors (1989) by William Shakespeare — Luciana
- A Midsummer Night's Dream (1989) by William Shakespeare — Titania
- All's Well That Ends Well (1989) by William Shakespeare — Helena
- The Taming of the Shrew (1988) by William Shakespeare —
- Twelfth Night (1988) by William Shakespeare — Viola
- My Fair Lady (1988) based on a play by George Bernard Shaw — Eliza Doolittle
- Richard III (1988) by William Shakespeare — Lady Anne
- Troilus and Cressida (1987) by William Shakespeare — Cassandra
- Rosencrantz and Guildenstern Are Dead (1986) by Tom Stoppard —Ophelia
- Henry VIII (1986) by William Shakespeare — Singing Gentlewomen
- Hamlet (1986) by William Shakespeare — Ophelia
- The Beaux' Stratagem (1985) by George Farquhar — Mrs. Suellen
- Antigone (1985) by Sophocles — Lady-in waiting
- Henry IV, Part I (1984) by William Shakespeare — Welsh Servant
- The Two Gentlemen of Verona (1984) by William Shakespeare — Lucetta

== Broadway credits ==
- King Lear (2004) by William Shakespeare — Regan (Vivian Beaumont Theater, 4 March 2004 to 18 April 2004)

== Credits at other theatres ==
- Do You Turn Somersaults? (2011) by Aleksei Arbuzov at Talk Is Free Theatre.

== Movies and TV ==
She is credited with 9 film/TV roles: As You Like It (2010, Audrey), Forever Knight (1996, Peggy Bolger), Goosebumps (1996, Mrs. Brewer), Kung Fu: The Legend Continues (1995, Marilyn), Demons (1995, Marilyn), 1992 Avonlea (1992, Amelia Sandhurst), Street Legal (1992), June Woodruff, The Comedy of Errors (1989, Luciana), Hangin' In (1983, Lucia, The Love Program (1983, Lucia), Der Opernball (1978, Marguérite).

== Video clips ==
As Mary Stuart in Schiller's Mary Stuart, 2013

Discussing her role as the Nurse in Shakespeare's Romeo and Juliet, 2008

Discussing her role as Grumio in Shakespeare's The Taming of the Shrew, 2008

== Publications ==
Peacock is the author of a facetious book of poems entitled "Limericks by Lucy Peacock as The Duchess of Malfi - written as she lay dead on the stage" (2011).
