= Louis Wharton =

Trinidadian-born English cricketer

Personal information
- Full name: Louis Edgar Wharton
- Born: 18 January 1896; Port of Spain, Trinidad
- Died: 31 December 1957 (aged 61); Port of Spain, Trinidad
- Batting: Right-handed
- Role: Batsman

Domestic team information
- Years: Team
- 1920: Oxford University
- 1921–1922: Somerset
- FC debut: 9 June 1920 Oxford Univ v Army
- Last FC: 9 June 1922 Somerset v Derbyshire

Career statistics
Competition	First-class
Matches	12
Runs scored	513
Batting average	22.30
100s/50s	0/3
Top score	86
Balls bowled	374
Wickets	3
Bowling average	78.33
5 wickets in innings	0
10 wickets in match	0
Best bowling	1/28
Catches/stumpings	3/–
- Source: CricketArchive, 23 December 2009

Louis Edgar Wharton (18 January 1896 – 31 December 1957), played first-class cricket in 12 matches in English cricket in the period from 1920 to 1922. He appeared once for Oxford University in 1920, and then 11 times for Somerset in 1921 and 1922.

Born at Port of Spain in Trinidad and educated at Douai School, Wharton was a right-handed middle-order batsman and an occasional bowler, though his bowling style is not known. He was at Oxford University as a "senior" in 1920 and played in two of three trial matches at the start of the season. He figured in only one first-class match for the university, however, in what Wisden described as "a very weak side" against The Army. Despite scoring 47 of a total of 95 in the second Oxford innings, and taking two of the three wickets he managed in his career during this match, he was not picked again.

In 1921, Wharton appeared spasmodically across the season for Somerset, batting with some success in several matches. His most successful period came towards the end of June. Against Derbyshire at Derby, he made 60 in Somerset's first innings, his first score of more than 50. Then in the following game, against Warwickshire at Edgbaston, he top-scored in both Somerset innings, making 86 in the first and an unbeaten 55 to win the match in the second. The 86 was his highest first-class score.

Wharton reappeared for Somerset in two matches in 1922 but was not successful and did not play first-class cricket again after this.
