= Stella Chitty =

British stage manager

Stella Chitty OBE
- Born: 11 March 1928; Brixton, London, United Kingdom
- Died: 17 June 2005 (aged 77); London, United Kingdom
- Occupation: Stage manager
- Employer: Royal Opera House

Stella Chitty OBE (11 March 1928 – 17 June 2005) was a British stage manager. In her 47-year career with the Royal Opera House, she rose to become the general stage manager.

== Early life ==
Stella Chitty was born in Brixton, London on 11 March 1928.

== Career ==
Chitty joined the Royal Opera House in 1950, and rose to become the general stage manager. Chitty started as a secretary in 1950, and soon became an assistant to stage manager Ande Anderson, and then deputy to David Peacock in 1958. From 1964 to 1993, she served as the general stage manager.

At the Royal Opera House, Chitty ensured that highly professional backstage management was bought to the running of productions.

She was appointed an OBE in 1992.

== Personal life ==
Chitty married William Bundy, lighting director, and later technical director, of the Royal Opera House, and secondly Jack Stirling-Wakeley, principal percussionist with the Orchestra of the Royal Opera House.

== Death ==
Chitty died in London on 17 June 2005, aged 77. A performance of Otello at the Royal Opera House on 28 June 2005 was dedicated to the memory of Chitty.
