= Upper Woolhampton =

Village in Berkshire, England

Coordinates: 51.403551°N 1.171123°W

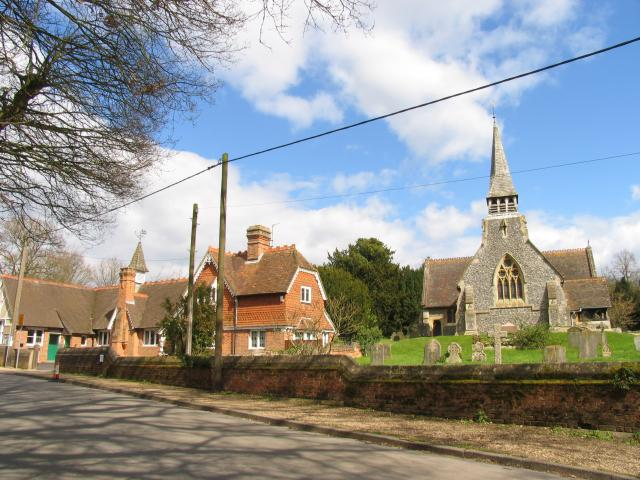
- St Peter's Church and C of E School

- Location within Berkshire
- OS grid reference: SU576675
- Civil parish: Woolhampton
- Unitary authority: West Berkshire
- Ceremonial county: Berkshire
- Region: South East
- Country: England
- Sovereign state: United Kingdom
- Police: Thames Valley
- Fire: Royal Berkshire
- Ambulance: South Central
- UK Parliament: Newbury

Upper Woolhampton is a village in the English county of Berkshire. It is situated on higher ground, 0.5 miles (800 m) to the north of the parent village of Woolhampton. Both the Grade II listed parish church of St Peter and the village school are located in Upper Woolhampton. Also in the village is the Grade II* listed Woolhampton House, now occupied by Elstree School, a preparatory school that relocated to Woolhampton from Elstree during the Second World War. The Benedictine Douai Abbey community, and its now-closed Douai School is located a further 0.5 miles (800 m) to the north. Upper Woolhampton is part of the civil parish of Woolhampton, and lies in the West Berkshire unitary authority district and the Newbury parliamentary constituency.
