= Stephen Poyntz =

English diplomat and courtier

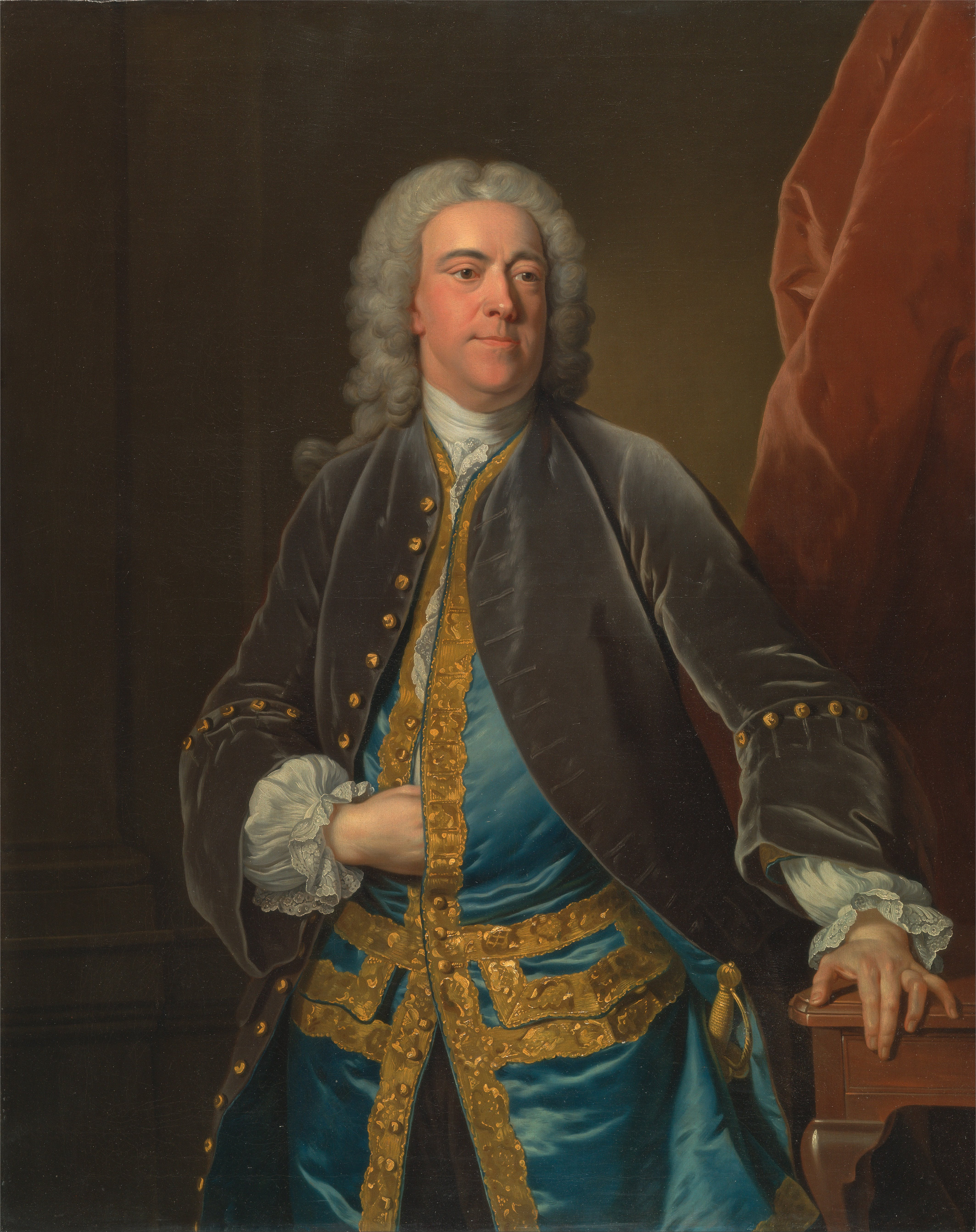
- Stephen Poyntz, oil on canvas by Jean-Baptiste van Loo around 1740
- Born: November 1685
- Died: 17 December 1750 (aged 65); Midgham, Berkshire, England
- Burial place: Midgham, Berkshire, England
- Education: Eton College, King's College, Cambridge
- Occupations: diplomat and courtier
- Notable work: Vindication of the Barrier Treaty
- Spouse: Anna Maria Mordaunt (m. 1733)
- Children: 2 sons, 3 daughters
- Parents: William Poyntz (father); Jane Monteage (mother)

Stephen Poyntz (1685–1750), of Midgham in Berkshire, was an English diplomat and courtier.

== Early life ==
Born in London, and baptised at St Michael Cornhill in November 1685, he was the second son of William Poyntz, upholsterer, of Cornhill, and his second wife Jane Monteage. His father William was descended from an old landowning family, the eldest branch of which was formerly seated at Iron Acton until its last male descendant died in 1665. The family fortunes suffered in the aftermath of the Civil War, and as a younger son of a younger son, William had been "forced into trade" as an upholsterer. Stephen Poyntz's mother Jane was a daughter of the merchant and accountant Stephen Monteage (1623–1687) and his wife Jane. Stephen Monteage was born Estienne Monteage to Estienne Monteage of Chastre, goldsmith in London (died 1657), and his wife Anne Mehoult (living 1641), who married at the French Protestant Church of London on Threadneedle Street in February 1612. Their children were christened there between 1613 and 1625.

On his mother's side, Stephen Poyntz had uncles John Monteage (died 1724), general accountant to the Bank of England, and Deane Monteage, who succeeded his father as steward to Christopher Hatton, 1st Viscount Hatton. The given name "Deane" refers to the family connection with the Deanes of Guiting Power, Gloucestershire. John Monteage's will of 1724 includes bequests to his nephew Stephen Poyntz, to Stephen's brothers William, Deane and Joseph Poyntz, and to his sister Hannah Poyntz: John's principal heir and executor was Stephen Monteage the younger, son of Deane Monteage.

Stephen Poyntz was educated at Eton College, a king's scholar and in 1702 captain of Montem. On 17 February 1703 he was admitted to King's College, Cambridge, and became in due course a Fellow there, graduating B.A. in 1706, and M.A. in 1711.

== Diplomat ==
Shortly after he left college, Poyntz travelled with William Cavendish, 2nd Duke of Devonshire; and he was also tutor to the sons of Charles Townshend, 2nd Viscount Townshend, with whom he was at The Hague in 1709 and 1710. He acted as Townshend's confidential secretary, communicating on his behalf with the English ambassadors abroad, and, through his chief's influence, he moved into the diplomatic service. Poyntz was commissary in 1716 to James Stanhope, 1st Earl Stanhope, the Secretary of State.

Poyntz was made envoy-extraordinary and plenipotentiary to Sweden in July 1724. Sir Robert Walpole complained about sums he drew from the Exchequer to secure Sweden's support, but he managed to defend the reputation of Sir John Norris against accusations going back to the Great Northern War. In 1728 he was sent as commissioner to the Congress of Soissons, where he made the acquaintance of George Lyttelton, 1st Baron Lyttelton, and he remained in France until the summer of 1730. He obtained the French agreement to dismantle the fortifications at Dunkirk, regarded as a deft diplomatic coup as well as a political triumph for the Whigs in London.

== Courtier ==
On the formation of the household of Prince William, Duke of Cumberland, second son of George II, Poyntz was appointed as the young Duke's governor and steward of the household. He continued as a trusted adviser. About 1735 he purchased from the Hillersdon family an estate at Midgham in the parish of Thatcham, near Newbury, Berkshire; the Duke spent some of his early years there.

Poyntz played a significant part at court. He acted in 1734 as the medium of communication between the king and queen and an Austrian envoy. It was in his rooms at St James's Palace that Charles Mordaunt, 3rd Earl of Peterborough, in 1735 acknowledged that Anastasia Robinson was his wife. In 1735 Poyntz was created a privy councillor and received a sinecure post.

== Family ==
Poyntz married, in February 1733, Anna Maria Mordaunt, daughter of the Hon. Lewis Mordaunt, brigadier-general, younger son of John Mordaunt, 1st Viscount Mordaunt. She served as a maid of honour to Queen Caroline of Ansbach and had been a great beauty, addressed by Samuel Croxall in his poem The Fair Circassian. They had two sons, William of Midgham (father of William Stephen Poyntz) and Charles, prebendary of Durham, and three daughters, Margaret Georgina, Louisa, and Sophia. Louisa died unmarried and Sophia married Sir Roger Martin, 3rd Baronet of Long Melford. Their most famous daughter Margaret Georgina became the wife of the future John Spencer, 1st Earl Spencer, at Althorp on 27 December 1755 (the day after he came of age). Mrs. Poyntz was in great favour at Versailles in August 1763, when she cured Madame Victoire of the stone. She died at Midgham on 14 November 1771, and was buried there.

== Associations and death ==
Poyntz was a friend of Samuel Richardson the novelist, a patron of James Ferguson the astronomer, and helped the scholar Elizabeth Elstob by a recommendation of support to the Queen. He died at Midgham on 17 December 1750, and was buried there.

== Works ==
Poyntz was the author of the long and anonymous Vindication of the Barrier Treaty (1712). It was a work praised at the time.
