= Midgham =

Coordinates: 51.401°N 1.203°W

- Village and civil parish
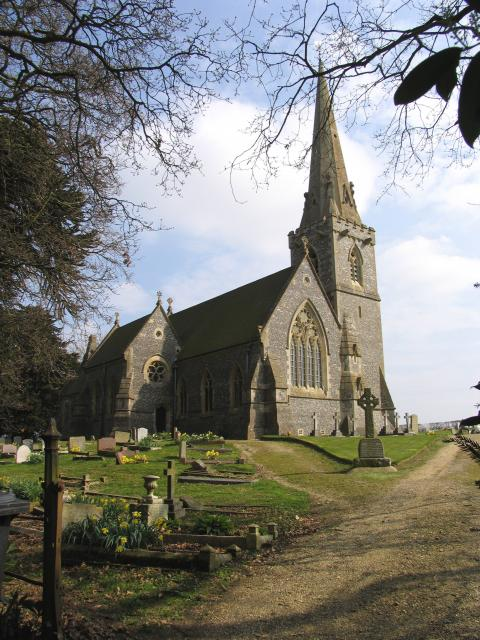
- St Matthew's parish church was built in 1869 in a tall 13th-century style.

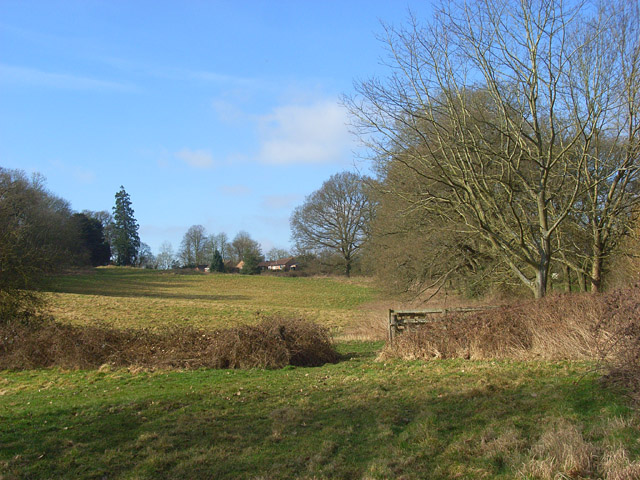
- View of upper part of Midgham Park estate.

- Location within Berkshire
- Area: 5.01 km^{2} (1.93 sq mi)
- Population: 334 (2011 census)
  - Density: 67/km^{2} (170/sq mi)
- OS grid reference: SU5567
- Civil parish: Midgham
- Unitary authority: West Berkshire
- Ceremonial county: Berkshire
- Region: South East
- Country: England
- Sovereign state: United Kingdom
- Post town: Reading
- Postcode district: RG7
- Dialling code: 0118
- Police: Thames Valley
- Fire: Royal Berkshire
- Ambulance: South Central
- UK Parliament: Newbury
- Website: The Midgham Village Website

Midgham is a village and civil parish occupying slopes and the flood plain on the north side of the River Kennet, which in summer months draws much of the water from the valley. It has smaller watercourses alongside. It is centred 6 miles (10 km) east of Newbury and 2 miles (3.2 km) east of Thatcham. The north of the parish is 4.5 miles (7 km) south of the M4 motorway.

== Geography ==
The village extends from New Road Hill to, Woolhampton Lock in the east, West Berkshire Crematorium in the west, Midgham Marsh (south of the A4 road) in the south and to Midgham Green to the north. Its elevations range from 60 to 121 m (197 to 397 ft) above sea level.

Midgham Wood covers most of the north-west and Channel Wood covers most of the north-east eighth of the parish. The vast majority of the other green space is cultivated land, pasture or hay meadows. The lowland area of lakes, river and canal is greater than that covered by roads across the whole parish, according to the 2005 Office for National Statistics survey.

== History ==
Few if any Roman traces have been found in the parish but there is known to be a Roman Road with a river crossing on Midgham Marsh. Midgham was, in the early medieval period, a township in Thatcham parish and is recorded in the Domesday Book of 1086 as such. A watermill is recorded here valued at 14 shillings (£0.70) per year. Giles Pinkney had been granted it by William the Conqueror or William II. Pinkney divided it into three sub-manors (this parish saw subinfeudation): Erley's manor centred on Midgham House plus two unnamed manors, occasionally later named after the families of some of their longest owners 'Chenduit' and 'Everard'. There were three sub-tenants of part, Almær, Ragner and Gilbert in 1086, who held 3 virgates, 1 virgate and 1 hide and 1½ virgates respectively.

The manor continued with the Pinkney Honour, which required "service of ward of Windsor Castle" including paying £1 for each of its 15 manors across the region to the constable of the castle. Robert Pinkney forfeited his estates for rebellion against King John, but recovered them on the accession of Henry III. Midgham's history since the Stuart period is published in national sources and by local historian John Trigg. There is evidence that the Knights Templars held land in Midgham but few details are known. Trade tokens have been found from the 17th century near the church so it is certain that there was trade in the area during the early modern period. When the ecclesiastical parish of Midgham was formed in 1857 the small third manor, Hall Court was converted into the vicarage.

== Midgham House ==
=== Poyntz family ===
The Poyntz family, anciently feudal barons of Curry Mallet in Somerset, later of Iron Acton in Gloucestershire, rebuilt Midgham House and lived there from 1735 to 1840. Residents included the diplomat, Stephen Poyntz, and his grandson the MP William Stephen Poyntz. Stephen was governor to Prince William, Duke of Cumberland who spent a few years of his youth here; two rooms were added for this, known as the Duke's rooms. It has a 15th-century red-brick former stable block with stone dressing. It is a Grade II listed building.

=== James Johnstone ===
In a University College London work of 2012, British Slave Ownership, Midgham House is shown as home of James Johnstone, sole proprietor of the Whitehall estate in 1835. The records state that he was recompensed by the government of the United Kingdom as part of the abolition of slavery in Britain and its colonies with £5,295 17s 0d (equivalent to £581,754 in 2025 of petty expenditure however as a lump sum of capital far more), for 294 enslaved (claim for Jamaica St Mary 168).

=== Benjamin Buck Greene ===
Benjamin Buck Greene, who later became Governor of the Bank of England, purchased the estate in 1856. He had the village chapel, which was near the house and not near the people, demolished in 1868 and the new church completed in the following year. He was followed on his death by Mr A. F. Clarke from 1908 until at least the 1920s. From 1947 until 1955 this country estate was owned by the Earl of Clarendon.

== Church ==
Midgham had its own chapel from at least 1309. The Chapel of Saint Margaret stood a little to the north-east of the present building (see above section). Midgham was part of the parish of Thatcham until 1857 when Greene, the new squire and lord of the manor, appointed the first vicar (Rev. John Errington) for the proposed Church of England parish church dedicated to Saint Matthew. 13th-century in style, the church was built by the architect John Johnson. The bell tower has an embattled parapet and an octagonal stone spire. There is a peal of six bells the oldest of which is inscribed "Ellis and Henry Knight made mee 1674." The old chapel stood to the north-east of the present building in the grounds of Midgham House. The registers begin in 1622. The church is part of a six-parish benefice.

== Transport ==
To avoid possible confusion with Wolverhampton, the station in Woolhampton 100 m (330 ft) east of the area's bounds (which is therefore the nearest station to all but the far western borders of Midgham), was renamed Midgham in 1873. This station is a minor stop with regular services on the Reading to Taunton Line.

Midgham Lock is on the Kennet and Avon Canal.

== Amenities ==
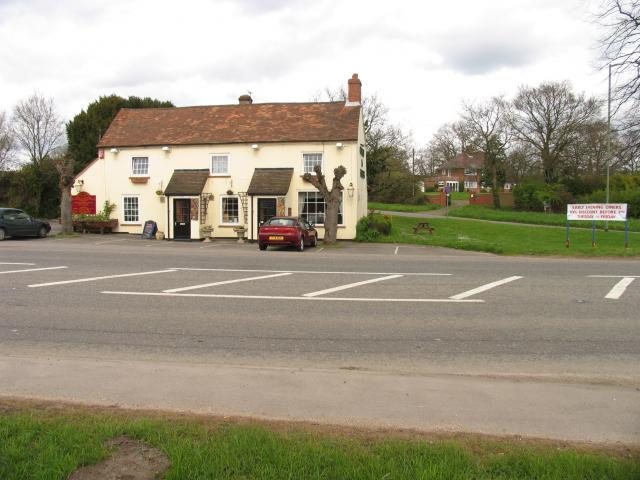
The Coach and Horses public house, Bath Road, Midgham

The village has a public house, The Coach and Horses. Midgham has a village green which is run by the parish council and a village hall run by its own committee. A variety of trees forms a sort of arboretum at Midgham Green in the north of the area. The main hall, on the Bath Road, is used for voluntary and social gatherings; its parish council allows it to be hired by fundraisers, lecturers and businesses.

== Notable people ==
- William Crowe (1745–1829; poet and public orator for Oxford University)
- John Jefferys (1701–1754; clockmaker and watchmaker)
- Sir William Sidney Smith (1764–1840; Royal Navy officer)
- Benjamin Challenger (1978–present; Olympic Athlete)

== Demography ==
2011 Published Statistics: Population, home ownership and extracts from Physical Environment, surveyed in 2005
Output area	Homes owned outright	Owned with a loan	Socially rented	Privately rented	Other	km^{2} roads	km^{2} water	km^{2} domestic gardens	Usual residents	km^{2}
Civil parish	49	38	6	23	8	0.078	0.102	0.110	334	5.01

== Sources ==
- Page, William; Ditchfield, P.H., eds. (1923). Victoria County History: A History of the County of Berkshire, Volume 3. pp. 311–329.
- Pevsner, Nikolaus (1966). The Buildings of England: Berkshire. Harmondsworth: Penguin Books. p. 178.
