= Festieux =

- Commune
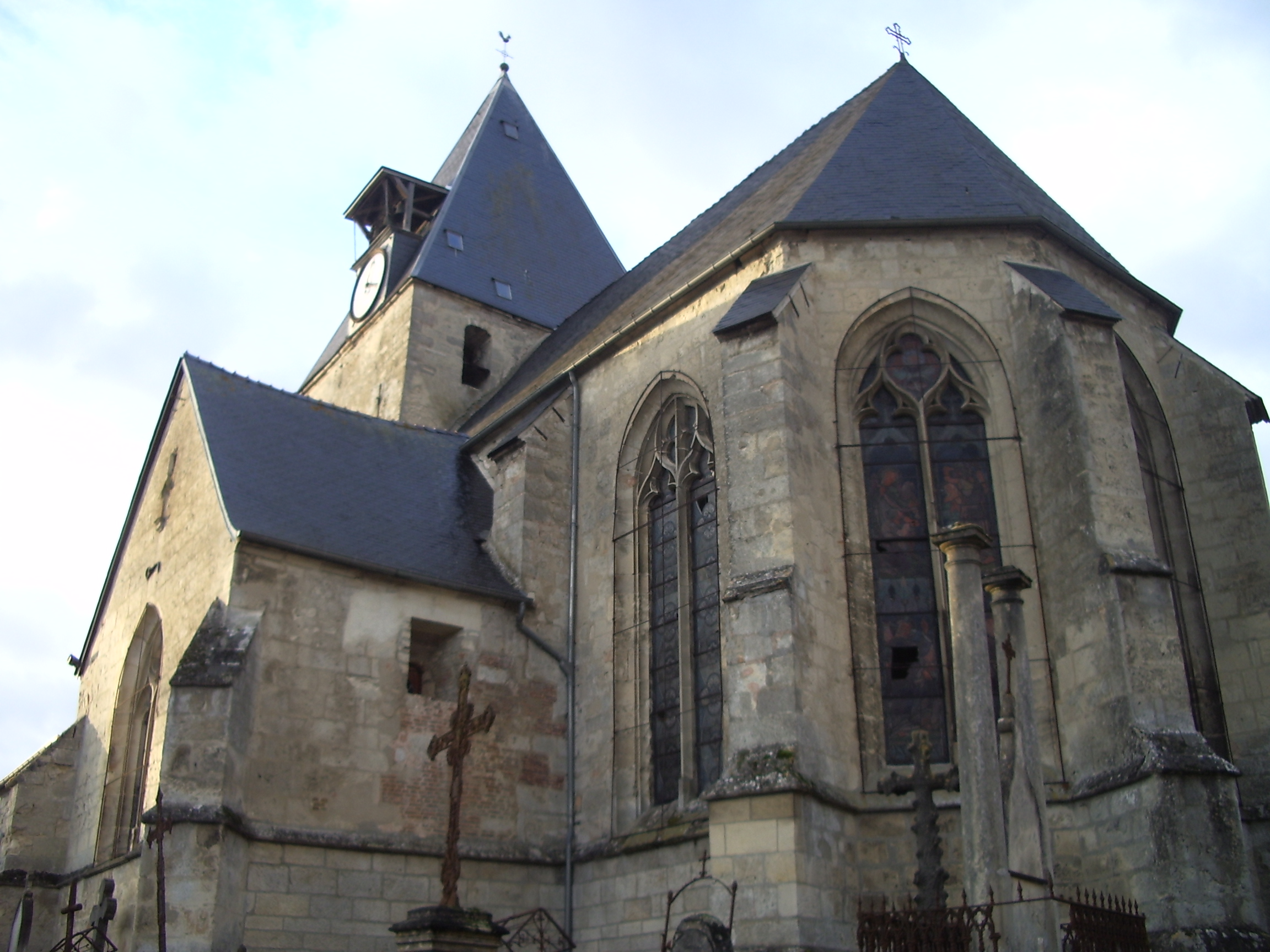
- The church of Festieux
- Location of Festieux
- Location within France Location within Hauts-de-France
- Coordinates: 49°31′23″N 3°45′16″E
- Country: France
- Region: Hauts-de-France
- Department: Aisne
- Arrondissement: Laon
- Canton: Laon-2
- Intercommunality: CA Pays de Laon

Government
  - Mayor (2026–32): Benoît Buvry
- Area^{1}: 6.67 km^{2} (2.58 sq mi)
- Elevation: 20 m (66 ft)
- Highest elevation: 208 m (682 ft)
- Lowest elevation: 89 m (292 ft)
- Population (2023): 704
  - Density: 106/km^{2} (273/sq mi)
- Time zone: UTC+01:00 (CET)
  - Summer (DST): UTC+02:00 (CEST)
- INSEE/Postal code: 02309 /02840
- ^{1} French Land Register data, which excludes lakes, ponds, glaciers > 1 km^{2} (0.386 sq mi or 247 acres) and river estuaries.

Festieux (French pronunciation: [fɛstjø]) is a commune in the Aisne department in Hauts-de-France in northern France.

== Population ==
Historical population
Year	Pop.	±% p.a.
1968	326	—
1975	337	+0.48%
1982	296	−1.84%
1990	449	+5.35%
1999	509	+1.40%
2007	536	+0.65%
2012	647	+3.84%
2017	680	+1.00%
2023	704	+0.58%
Source: INSEE

== See also ==
- Communes of the Aisne department
