= Anthony Bertram =

British novelist and art historian

Cyril Anthony George Bertram (19 November, 1897 - July 1978) was a British novelist and art historian.

He resented programmes on BBC Radio and appeared as a guest on BBC television programmes, about design.

Bertram was the great-grandfather of actor Thomas Sangster. His wife, Barbara May (Randolph), was the sister of actor Hugh Grant's maternal grandmother; Barbara was descended from politician and colonial administrator Sir Evan Nepean.

== Works ==
- English Portraiture in the National Portrait Gallery (1924)
- The Pool (1926) novel
- Here We Ride (1927) novel
- The Life of Sir Peter-Paul Rubens (1928)
- Velázquez (1928)
- To the Mountains (1929)
- The Sword Falls (1930)
- Picasso (1930)
- Matisse (1930)
- They Came to the Castle (1932)
- Pavements and Peaks: Impressions of Travel in Germany and Austria (1933)
- Favourite British Paintings (1934)
- The House : A Machine for Living in (1935)
- Men Adrift (1935)
- The King Sees Red (1936)
- Like the Phoenix (1936) novel
- Design in Everyday Things (1937)
- Ode to a Bulging Member (1937)
- Design in Daily Life (1937)
- Design (1938)
- Contemporary Painting in Europe (1939)
- Bright Defiler (1940)
- Jan Vermeer of Delft (1948)
- William Blake (1948)
- Hans Holbein the Younger (1948)
- Sandro Botticelli (1948)
- Vermeer (1948)
- Piero della Francesca (1949)
- Pieter Bruegel the Elder (1949)
- Michelangelo (1949)
- Jean-Augustine-Dominique Ingres (1949)
- El Greco (1949)
- Hogarth (1949)
- The Van Eycks : Hubert & Jan (1950)
- Delacroix (1950)
- The Pleasures Of Poverty: An Argument and an Anthology (1950)
- Hieronymus Bosch (1950)
- Grunewald (1950)
- Rubens (1950)
- Gauguin (1950)
- Giotto (1951)
- A Century of British Painting 1851-1951 (1951)
- Paul Nash: The Portrait of an Artist (1955)
- Poet and Painter: Correspondence between Gordon Bottomley and Paul Nash 1910-1946 (1955); editor with Claude Colleer Abbott
- Rembrandt (1955)
- Sickert (1955)
- Modigliani (1965)
- One Thousand Years of Drawing (1966)
- Florentine Sculpture (1969)
