= The Hour (newspaper) =

Newspaper in Norwalk, Connecticut

The Norwalk Hour
- Type: Daily newspaper
- Owner: Hearst Communications
- Publisher: Mike Deluca
- Founded: 1871
- Language: English
- Headquarters: Norwalk, Connecticut
- Circulation: 15,048
- OCLC number: 27905790
- Website: thehour.com

The Norwalk Hour is a daily newspaper published in Norwalk, Connecticut, by Hearst Media Services, Connecticut. It primarily covers and serves the city of Norwalk.

== History ==
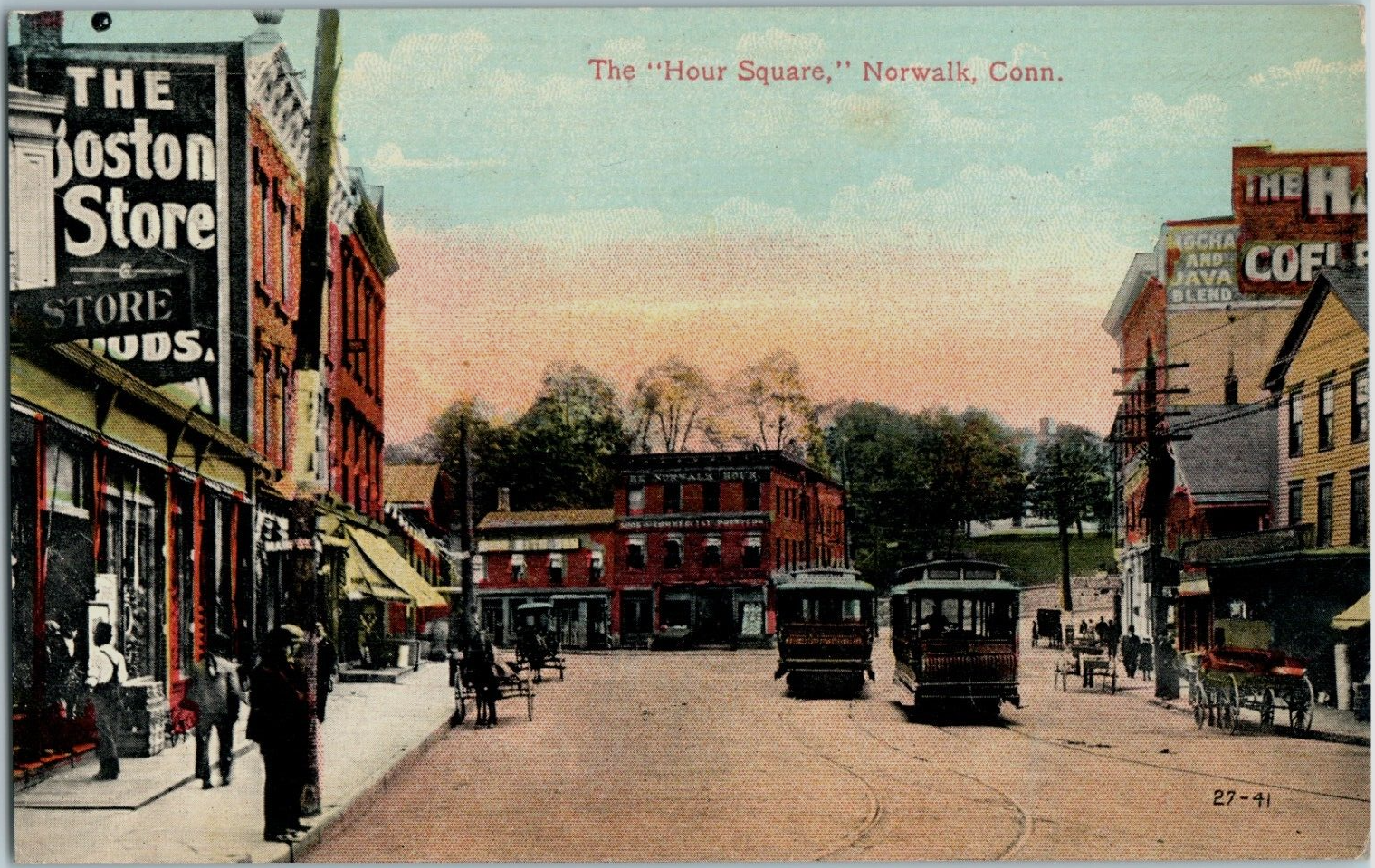
1912 postcard with the Norwalk Hour building at center

The newspaper was founded in 1871. It was published under the title The Evening Hour from 1895 into the 1900s, at which point it was renamed The Norwalk Hour. Some time after 1971, it became simply The Hour. The newspaper covers local news, business, sports, and entertainment, and as of April 2003, had a circulation of 16,070. In 2000, The Hour shifted from afternoon to morning deliveries.

In 2003, competition between The Hour and its larger rival, The Advocate, came to a head. On May 15, the Stamford-based competitor began circulating a special Norwalk edition with significantly increased local coverage and a price that substantially undercut The Hour. The rivalry escalated to barbs traded on editorial pages.

Hearst, which took control of the Advocate in 2008, acquired The Hour for an undisclosed price in a deal announced in April 2016. The seller was the Nellie M. Thomas Trust, owner of the Hour Publishing Co. According to reports, its print circulation at the time was about 12,000 daily copies.

On June 25, 2017, the newspaper was reflagged The Norwalk Hour. The move coincided with its relocation to 301 Merritt 7 in Norwalk, along with the offices of Hearst Connecticut Media.
