= Woolhampton Lock =

Lock in Woolhampton, Berkshire, England

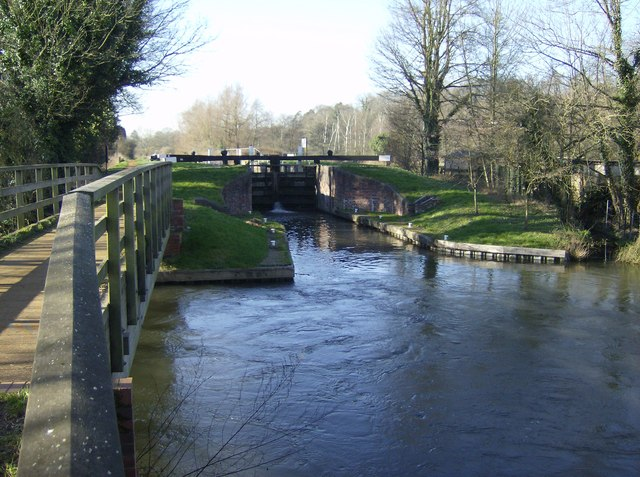
- Woolhampton Lock, with the River Kennet flowing under the towpath bridge in the foreground
- 51°23′41″N 1°10′51″W
- Waterway: Kennet and Avon Canal
- Country: England
- County: Berkshire
- Maintained by: Canal and River Trust
- Operation: manual
- First built: 1718–1723
- Fall: 8 feet 11 inches (2.72 m)

Woolhampton Lock is a lock on the Kennet and Avon Canal, in the village of Woolhampton in the English county of Berkshire. The lock has a rise/fall of 8 feet 11 inches (2.72 m) and is administered by the Canal and River Trust.

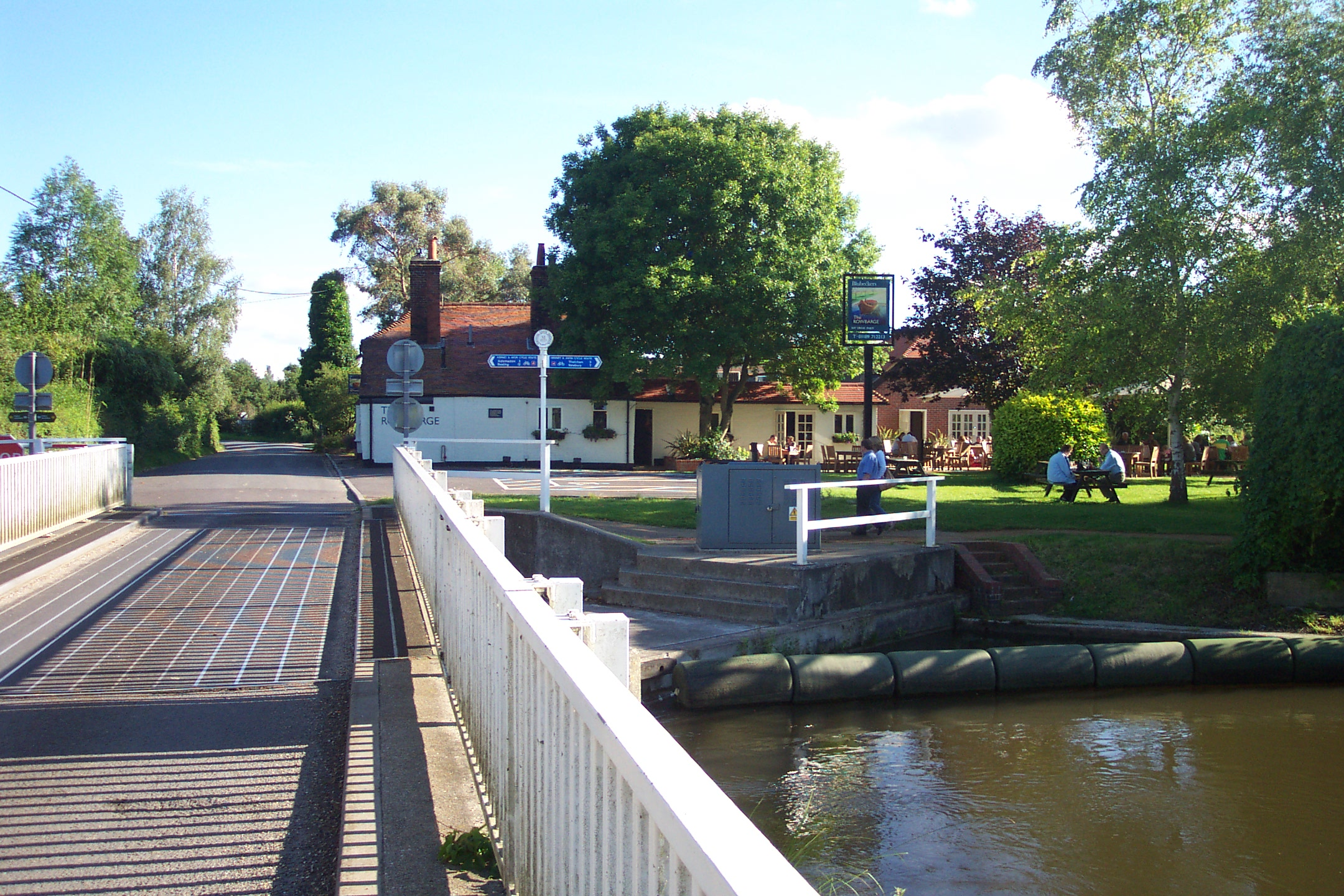
The swing bridge and Row Barge public house

Woolhampton Lock lies on the stretch of the canal that was originally built between 1718 and 1723, under the supervision of the engineer John Hore of Newbury, as the Kennet Navigation. This navigation is an improved river navigation rather than a true canal, and consists of sections of the natural riverbed of the River Kennet alternating with artificially created lock cuts and locks.

Woolhampton Lock is at the downstream end of an artificial lock cut, and the river and lock cut rejoin at the foot of the lock. Just to the east and downstream of this, the navigable river is crossed by a swing bridge carrying the road from the centre of Woolhampton village to the nearby village of Brimpton. Craft are warned to enter or leave the lock and pass under the open bridge in a single movement, since the current from the incoming river tends to push boats off course and there is nowhere to moor between the lock and bridge. Adjacent to this bridge is the Row Barge public house.

== See also ==
- List of locks on the Kennet and Avon Canal

Next lock upstream	River Kennet / Kennet and Avon Canal	Next lock downstream
Heale's Lock	Woolhampton Lock; Grid reference: SU571665	Aldermaston Lock
