= Gabriel Gifford =

English Benedictine monk

Gabriel Gifford, OSB (also known as Gabriel of St Mary; French: Gabriel de Sainte-Marie; 1554 – 11 April 1629) was an English Benedictine monk who became Archbishop of Reims.

== Life ==
Born William Gifford in Hampshire to John Gifford, Esq., of Weston-under-Edge, Gloucestershire, and his wife, Elizabeth, daughter of George Throckmorton, Knight of Coughton, Warwickshire, he was sent to Oxford in 1569, where he was entrusted to the care of John Bridgewater, President of Lincoln College.

Gifford remained at Oxford for about four years, part of which time he spent in the boarding school kept by the Catholic physician, Etheridge, where he had been placed on the compulsory retirement of Bridgewater for refusal to conform. After that period, Gifford, accompanied by his tutor, proceeded to the Catholic University of Louvain (1573), resumed there his studies, and took the degree of Master of Arts. After having also obtained his baccalaureate in theology on the completion of a four-year course in that science under Cardinal Robert Bellarmine, Gifford was forced to quit Leuven owing to the disturbances in the Low Countries.

Gifford pursued his ecclesiastical studies at Paris, at the University of Reims, which he visited (1577) at the invitation of Cardinal William Allen, and at the English College at Rome, to which he was admitted as a student on 15 September 1579. Having been ordained priest in March 1582, he was recalled to Reims by Allen to be the professor of theology at the English College there.

The degree of Doctor of Divinity was conferred on Gifford in December 1584 by the Jesuit University of Pont-à-Mousson (now the University of Nancy), after which, returning to Reims, Gifford taught theology at intervals for nearly twelve years. Upon Allen's elevation to the cardinalate, Gifford accompanied him to Rome in the capacity of chaplain, and it is said that during this visit he resided for a time in the household of Charles Borromeo. About this time (1597) Gifford was appointed to the deanery of Lille, which office Pope Clement VIII conferred on him at the urging, it is alleged, of the Archbishop of Milan. This dignity he retained for about ten years, and, after his withdrawal from Lille (c. 1606), he was made "Rector magnificus" of Reims University. In 1608, Gifford, who had always esteemed the Benedictines, and befriended them in many ways, took the habit of that order under the religious name of Gabriel of St Mary and subsequently became prior of the Monastery of St. Lawrence at Dieulouard (Dieulewart), now Ampleforth Abbey in England.

In 1611, Gifford was sent to Brittany to lay the foundation of a small community of his order at St. Malo. He was favourably received by the bishop, and a chair of divinity was assigned to him. He was one of the nine definitors chosen in 1617 to arrange the terms of union among the Benedictine congregations in England; he was elected first president of the province in May of the same year. In 1618, Gifford was consecrated coadjutor bishop to Louis III, Cardinal of Guise, Archbishop of Reims, with the titular title of Bishop of Arcadiopolis in Thrace. On the death of Guise, he succeeded to the archbishopric, becoming also, by virtue of his office, Duke of Reims and First Peer of France. Concerning his administration of Reims, Joseph Bergin has written, "Despite vast experience, he was too old by 1622 to achieve much in [the] badly neglected diocese."

== Works ==
Before Guifford's death, which occurred in 1629 at Reims, he had acquired a high reputation as a preacher. His writings include:

- Oratio Funebris in exequiis venerabilis viri domini Maxæmiliani Manare præpositi ecclesiæ D. Petri oppidi Insulensis (Douai, 1598);
- Orationes diversæ (Douai);
- Calvino-Turcismus, etc. (Antwerp, 1597 and 1603).

The latter work, begun by Reynolds, Clifford completed and edited. He translated from the French of Fronto-Ducæus "The Inventory of Errors, Contradictions, and false Citations of Philip Mornay, Lord of Plessis and Mornay". He also wrote, at the request of the Duke of Guise, a treatise in favour of the Ligue.

The Sermones Adventuales (Reims, 1625) were a Latin rendering by Gifford of discourses originally delivered in French. He assisted Anthony Champney in his "Treatise on the Protestant Ordinations" (Douai, 1616); others of Gifford's manuscripts were destroyed in the burning of the monastery at Dieulouard in 1717.

== Notes ==
Catholic Church titles
Preceded by Louis III, Cardinal of Guise	Archbishop of Reims; 1623–1629	Succeeded by Henry of Guise
