= John O'Connor (priest) =

English priest, basis for Chesterton's Father Brown

The Right Reverend Monsignor John O'Connor
- Born: 5 December 1870; Clonmel, County Tipperary, Ireland
- Died: 6 February 1952 (aged 81); Horsforth, Leeds, England
- Religion: Roman Catholic Church
- Ordained: 30 March 1895
- Congregations served: Curate at St Joseph's Church, Bradford; Curate at St Marie's Church, Halifax and St Anne's Church, Keighley; Parish priest of Heckmondwike; Parish priest at St Cuthbert's Church, Bradford

John O'Connor (5 December 1870 – 6 February 1952) was an Irish Catholic parish priest in England who was the basis of G. K. Chesterton's fictional detective Father Brown. O'Connor was instrumental in Chesterton's conversion to Roman Catholicism in 1922. O'Connor also received the poet and painter David Jones into the church in 1921 and was associated with Eric Gill and the Guild of St Joseph and St Dominic at Ditchling.

== Biography ==
Born on 5 December 1870 in Clonmel, County Tipperary, Ireland, O'Connor was educated by the Franciscans and Christian Brothers until the age of twelve, at which point he left for Douai in Flanders to study at the English Benedictine College. He later studied theology and philosophy at the English College in Rome.

O'Connor was ordained at St. John Lateran on 30 March 1895. O'Connor served as curate at St. Joseph's in Bradford, England, and later at St. Marie's, Halifax, West Vale and St. Anne's, Keighley. From 1909 to 1919, O'Connor was parish priest of Heckmondwike, where he helped build the Church of the Holy Spirit. It was in Keighley that O'Connor met the writer G. K. Chesterton in 1904. He would later receive Chesterton into the Roman Catholic faith in 1922. O'Connor served as parish priest of St Cuthbert's, Bradford, from 1919 until his death. In 1937 he was made a Privy Chamberlain to His Holiness (a monsignor). O'Connor died at the Sisters of Mercy nursing home in Horsforth on 6 February 1952.

== Literary connections ==
After meeting G. K. Chesterton in 1904, O'Connor became the model for the Father Brown character and the two men maintained a friendship for over 30 years. O'Connor was also associated with the Catholic authors Hilaire Belloc, Maurice Baring and the (convert) typographer and engraver Eric Gill. O'Connor published poems, book reviews and prose in English Catholic periodicals and newspapers, and also translated the work of French poet Paul Claudel (including "The Satin Slipper" and "Ways and Crossways") and the philosopher Jacques Maritain's "Art et Scolastique".

== Archive ==
The papers of O'Connor are held at the University of St. Michael's College at the University of Toronto. The collection contains hand-written and typed manuscripts, poems, translations and radio transcripts created and accumulated by O'Connor, as well as his correspondence, collected ephemera (including news clippings, Christmas cards, posters, pamphlets, and small press publications) and research notes. The majority of the material relates to O'Connor friendship with the author G. K. Chesterton, although O'Connor also translated Latin religious poetry and composed his own verse and wrote prose pieces on literature, church history, morality, religion and philosophy.

== External links and related archival material ==
- G.K. Chesterton Archival Collection at the University of St. Michael's College at the University of Toronto
- Works by Monsignor John O'Connor at Faded Page (Canada)
- Works by John O'Connor at LibriVox (public domain audiobooks)
