= Woolhampton =

Coordinates: 51°23′49″N 1°10′37″W

- Village and civil parish
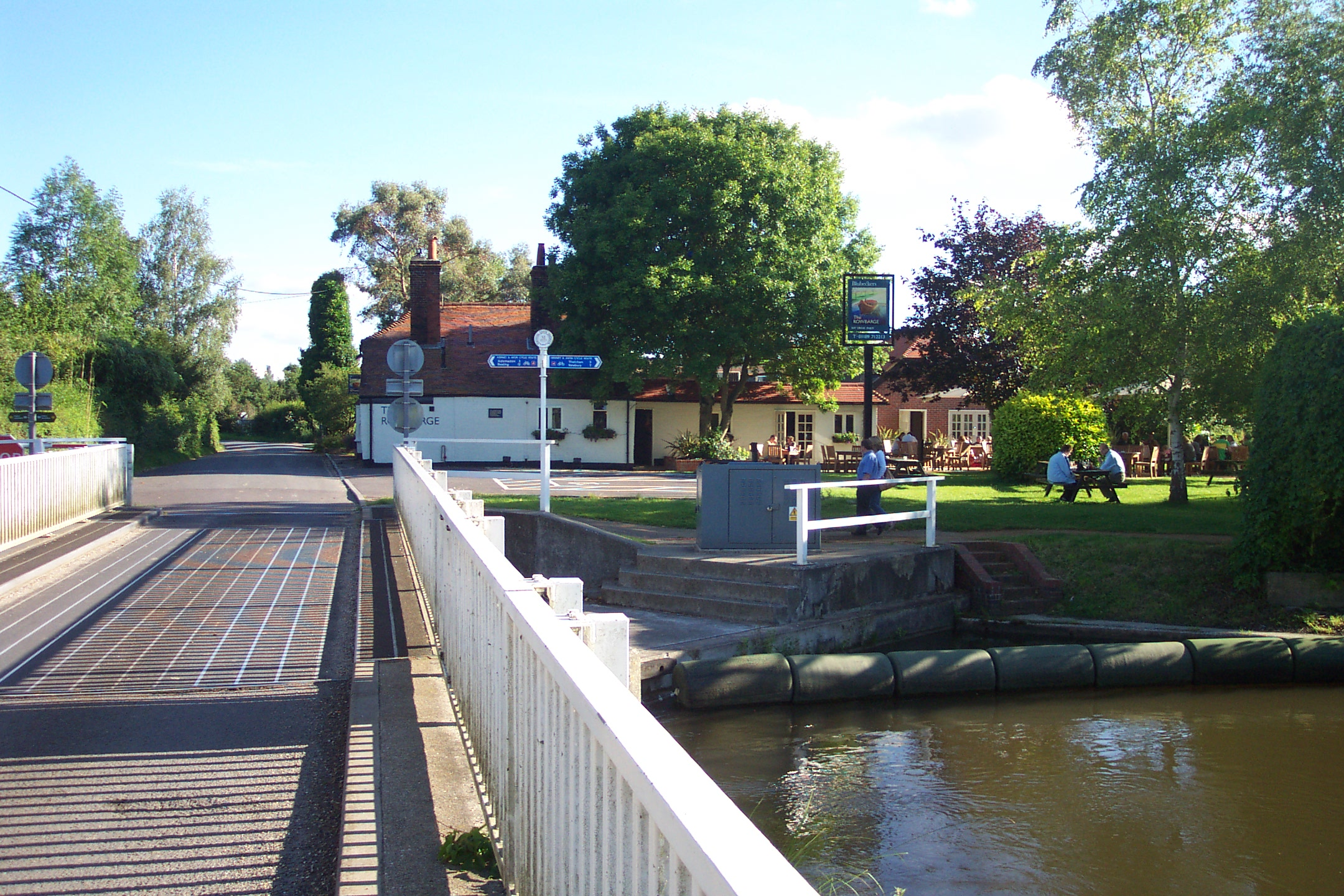
- Woolhampton Swing Bridge

- Location within Berkshire
- Area: 3.87 km^{2} (1.49 sq mi)
- Population: 886 (2011 census)
  - Density: 229/km^{2} (590/sq mi)
- OS grid reference: SU5767
- Civil parish: Woolhampton
- Unitary authority: West Berkshire
- Ceremonial county: Berkshire
- Region: South East
- Country: England
- Sovereign state: United Kingdom
- Post town: READING
- Postcode district: RG7
- Dialling code: 0118
- Police: Thames Valley
- Fire: Royal Berkshire
- Ambulance: South Central
- UK Parliament: Reading West and Mid Berkshire
- Website: Woolhampton Parish

Woolhampton is a village and civil parish in West Berkshire, England. The village straddles the Bath Road between the towns of Reading, 8 miles (13 km) to the east, and Newbury, 6 miles (10 km) to the west.

== Geography ==
The village homes are clustered on the northern side of the plain of the River Kennet, with the Berkshire Downs rising through the fields and woods of the village northwards. On the higher land some half mile to the north of the village is the adjacent settlement of Upper Woolhampton, which contains both the parish church and the village school. The A4 forms the main street of the village. An unclassified road runs to the south, towards the village of Brimpton. This crosses the railway line by the station on a level crossing, followed shortly afterwards by a swing bridge across the river and canal which share a common channel at this point. Woolhampton Lock lies just to the west. Two other unclassified roads leave the village to the north, climbing into the Berkshire Downs.

== Transport ==
Three major transport routes, the Bath Road, the Kennet and Avon Canal and the Reading to Taunton line pass through the village.

Woolhampton is served by Midgham railway station in the village. The railway station was originally known as Woolhampton but, according to local legend, was renamed Midgham railway station, after the village of Midgham, 1 mile (1.6 km) west-north-west, in order to avoid possible confusion with the similarly named Wolverhampton (the Great Western Railway had stations in both places).

== Amenities ==
Because of its location on the Bath Road, Woolhampton was well known for its coaching inns. Only one of these, the Angel, survives on the main road, after the Falmouth Arms closed in 2014 and was converted to residential property. A second pub, the Rowbarge, is, as its name suggests, situated alongside the Kennet and Avon Canal next to the swing bridge. The war memorial in Woolhampton was designed by Sir Robert Lorimer in 1920. The Woolhampton Reed Bed, a Site of Special Scientific Interest, lies alongside the River Kennet within the parish and to the south east of the village. The dense reed bed, with smaller areas of tall fen and carr wetlands, is notable for its nesting passerine bird populations and for the diversity of insects it supports.

== Governance ==
The civil parish of Woolhampton also includes the adjacent settlement of Upper Woolhampton and the rural areas to the north, east and south of the village. It has a parish council, and also lies in the West Berkshire unitary authority district and the Newbury parliamentary constituency.

== Demography ==
2011 Published Statistics: Population, home ownership and extracts from Physical Environment, surveyed in 2005
| Output area | Homes owned outright | Owned with a loan | Socially rented | Privately rented | Other | Roads | Water | Domestic gardens | Usual residents | Overall area |
|---|---|---|---|---|---|---|---|---|---|---|
| Civil parish | 137 | 125 | 30 | 43 | 18 | 0.076 km^{2} | 0.054 km^{2} | 0.173 km^{2} | 886 | 3.87 km^{2} |

== See also ==
- List of civil parishes in Berkshire
