= List of schools in West Berkshire =

This is a list of schools in West Berkshire, in the English county of Berkshire.

== State-funded schools ==
=== Primary schools ===
- Aldermaston CE Primary School, Aldermaston
- Basildon CE Primary School, Upper Basildon
- Beedon CE Primary School, Beedon
- Beenham Primary School, Beenham
- Birch Copse Primary School, Tilehurst
- Bradfield CE Primary School, Southend
- Brightwalton CE Primary School, Brightwalton
- Brimpton CE Primary School, Brimpton
- Bucklebury CE Primary School, Upper Bucklebury
- Burghfield St Marys CE Primary School, Burghfield
- Calcot Infant School, Calcot
- Calcot Junior School, Calcot
- Chaddleworth St Andrews CE Primary School, Chaddleworth
- Chieveley Primary School, Chieveley
- Cold Ash St Mark's CE Primary School, Cold Ash
- Compton CE Primary School, Compton
- Curridge Primary School, Curridge
- Downsway Primary School, Tilehurst
- Enborne CE Primary School, Enborne
- Englefield CE Primary School, Englefield
- Falkland Primary School, Newbury
- Fir Tree Primary School, Newbury
- Francis Baily Primary School, Thatcham
- Garland Junior School, Burghfield Common
- Hampstead Norreys CE Primary School, Hampstead Norreys
- Hermitage Primary School, Hermitage
- Highwood Copse Primary School, Newbury
- Hungerford Primary School, Hungerford
- The Ilsleys Primary School, Newbury
- Inkpen Primary School, Inkpen
- John Rankin Infant School, Newbury
- John Rankin Junior School, Newbury
- Kennet Valley Primary School, Calcot
- Kintbury St Marys CE Primary School, Kintbury
- Lambourn CE Primary School, Lambourn
- Long Lane Primary School, Tilehurst
- Mortimer St John's CE Infant School, Mortimer Common
- Mortimer St Mary's CE Junior School, Mortimer Common
- Mrs Bland's Infant School, Burghfield Common
- Pangbourne Primary School, Pangbourne
- Parsons Down Infant School, Thatcham
- Parsons Down Junior School, Thatcham
- Purley CE Primary School, Purley on Thames
- Robert Sandilands Primary School, Speen
- St Finian's RC Primary School, Cold Ash
- St John the Evangelist CE Infant School, Newbury
- St Joseph's RC Primary School, Newbury
- St Nicolas CE Junior School, Newbury
- St Paul's RC Primary School, Tilehurst
- Shaw-cum-Donnington CE Primary School, Donnington
- Shefford CE Primary School, Great Shefford
- Speenhamland Primary School, Newbury
- Springfield Primary School, Tilehurst
- Spurcroft Primary School, Thatcham
- Stockcross CE School, Stockcross
- Streatley CE School, Streatley
- Sulhamstead and Ufton Nervet CE School, Ufton Nervet
- Thatcham Park CE Primary School, Thatcham
- Theale CE Primary School, Theale
- Welford and Wickham CE Primary School, Wickham
- Westwood Farm Infant School, Tilehurst
- Westwood Farm Junior School, Tilehurst
- Whitelands Park Primary School, Thatcham
- The Willows Primary School, Newbury
- The Winchcombe School, Shaw
- Woolhampton CE Primary School, Woolhampton
- Yattendon CE Primary School, Yattendon

=== Secondary schools ===
- Denefield School, Tilehurst
- The Downs School, Compton
- John O'Gaunt School, Hungerford
- Kennet School, Thatcham
- Little Heath School, Tilehurst
- Park House School, Newbury
- St Bartholomew's School, Newbury
- Theale Green School, Theale
- Trinity School, Shaw
- The Willink School, Burghfield Common

=== Special and alternative schools ===
- Brookfields Special School, Tilehurst
- The Castle School, Donnington
- Icollege Alternative Provision, Newbury

=== Further education ===
- Newbury College

== Independent schools ==
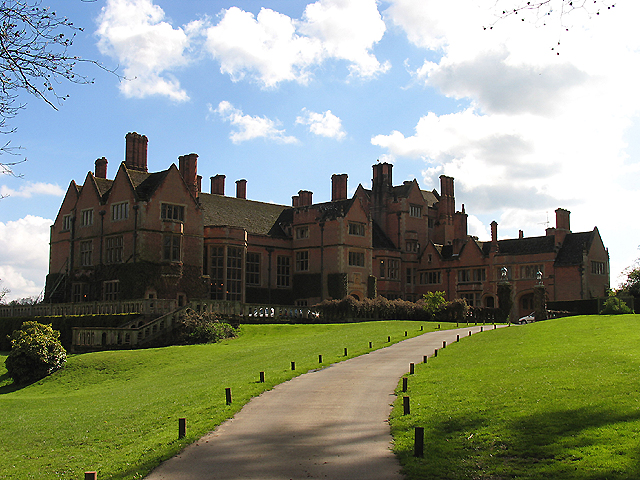
Brockhurst and Marlston House School

=== Primary and preparatory schools ===
- Brockhurst and Marlston House School, Marlston
- Elstree School, Woolhampton
- St Andrew's School, Pangbourne

=== Senior and all-through schools ===
- Bradfield College, Bradfield
- Downe House School, Cold Ash
- Padworth College, Padworth (closed 2025)
- Pangbourne College, Pangbourne
- St Gabriel's School, Sandleford

=== Special and alternative schools ===
- Engaging Potential, Newbury
- The Grange School, Thatcham
- Hillcrest New Barn School, Welford
- Mary Hare School, Snelsmore
- The Mile House Therapeutic School, Sulhamstead
- Oaklands School, Hungerford
- Priors Court School, Hermitage
- TLG Reading, Calcot
