= Kentwood (Reading ward) =

Electoral ward in Reading, Berkshire, England

Coordinates: 51.465275°N 1.032211°W

Kentwood Ward, Borough of Reading
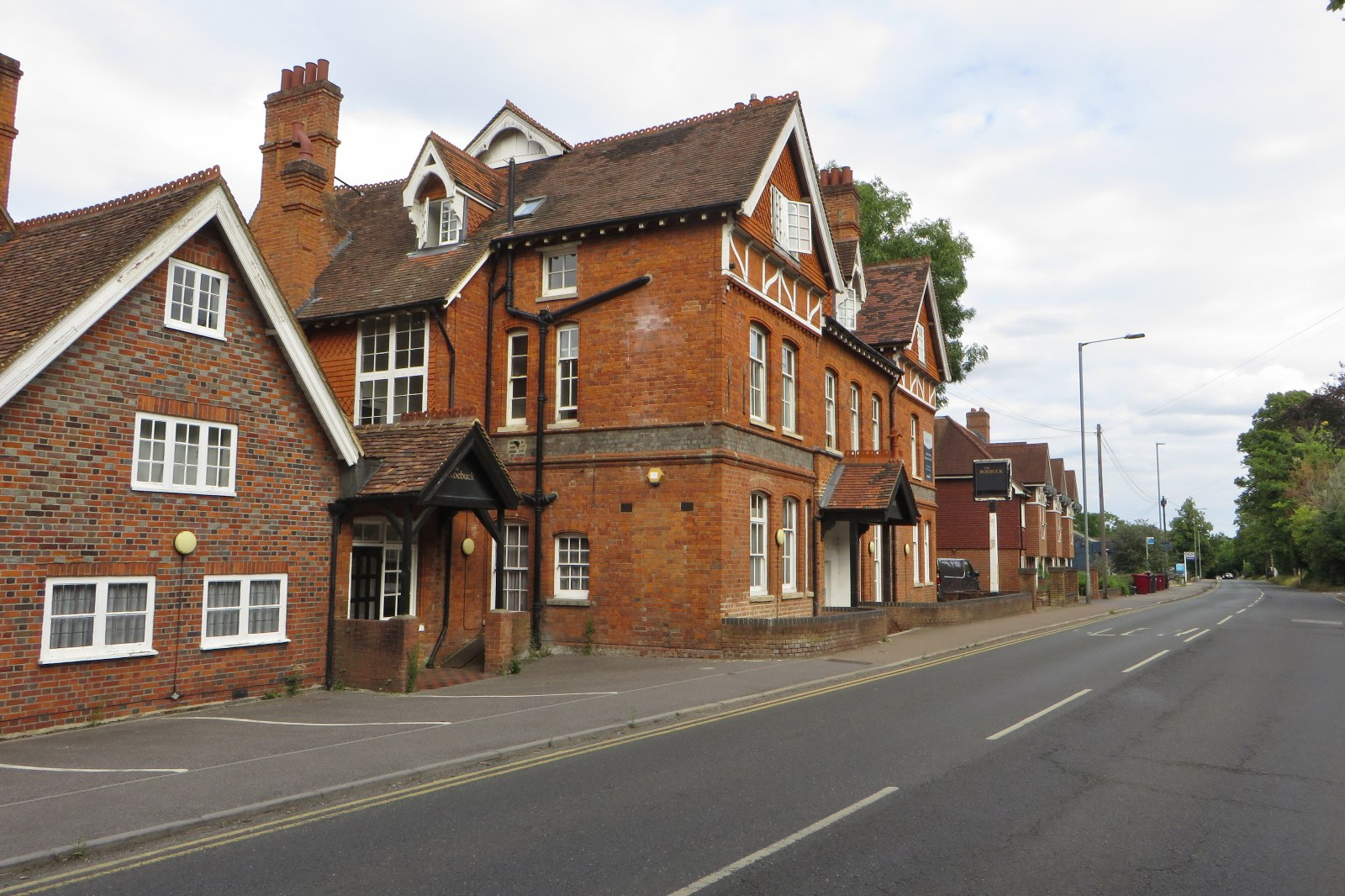
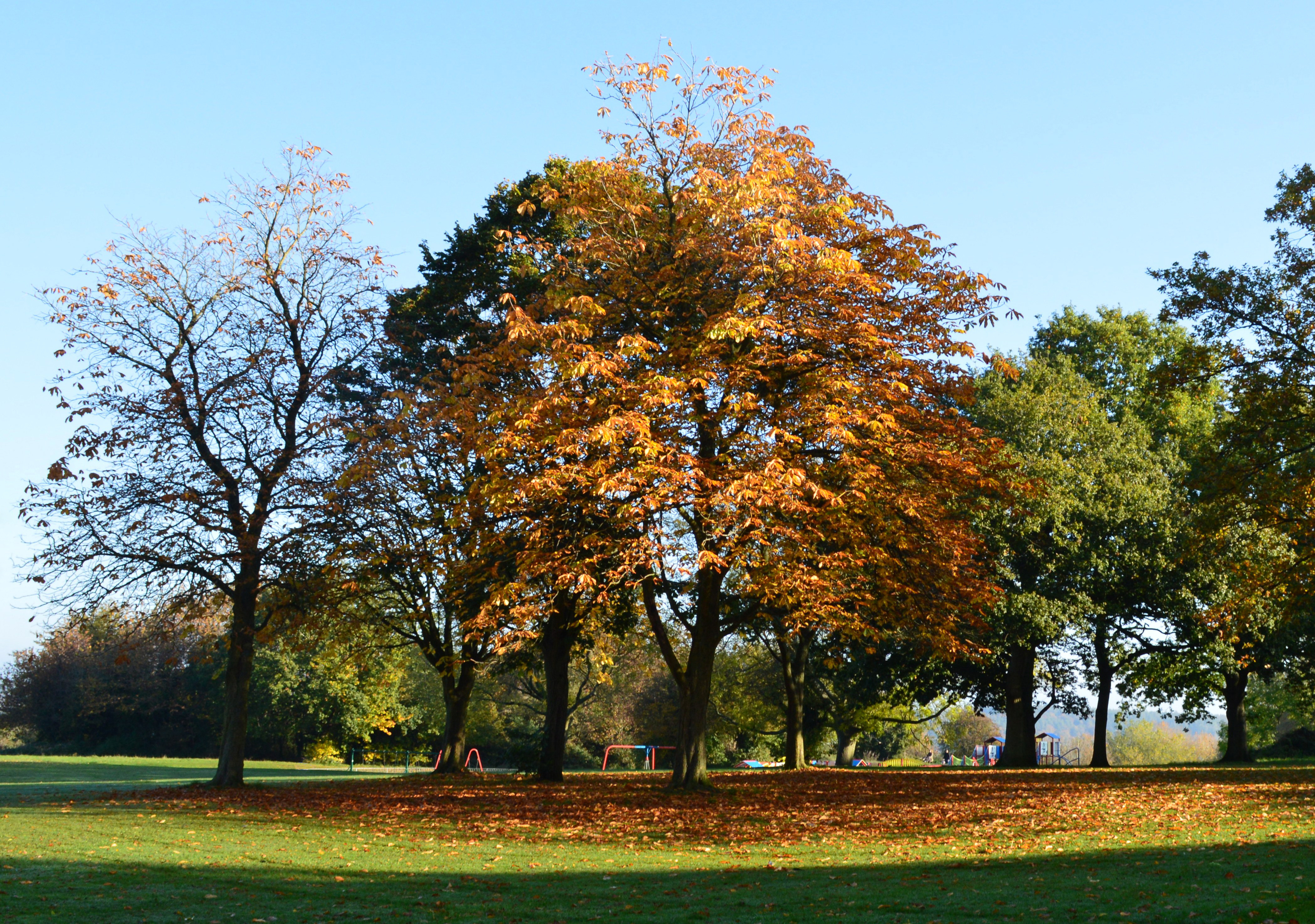
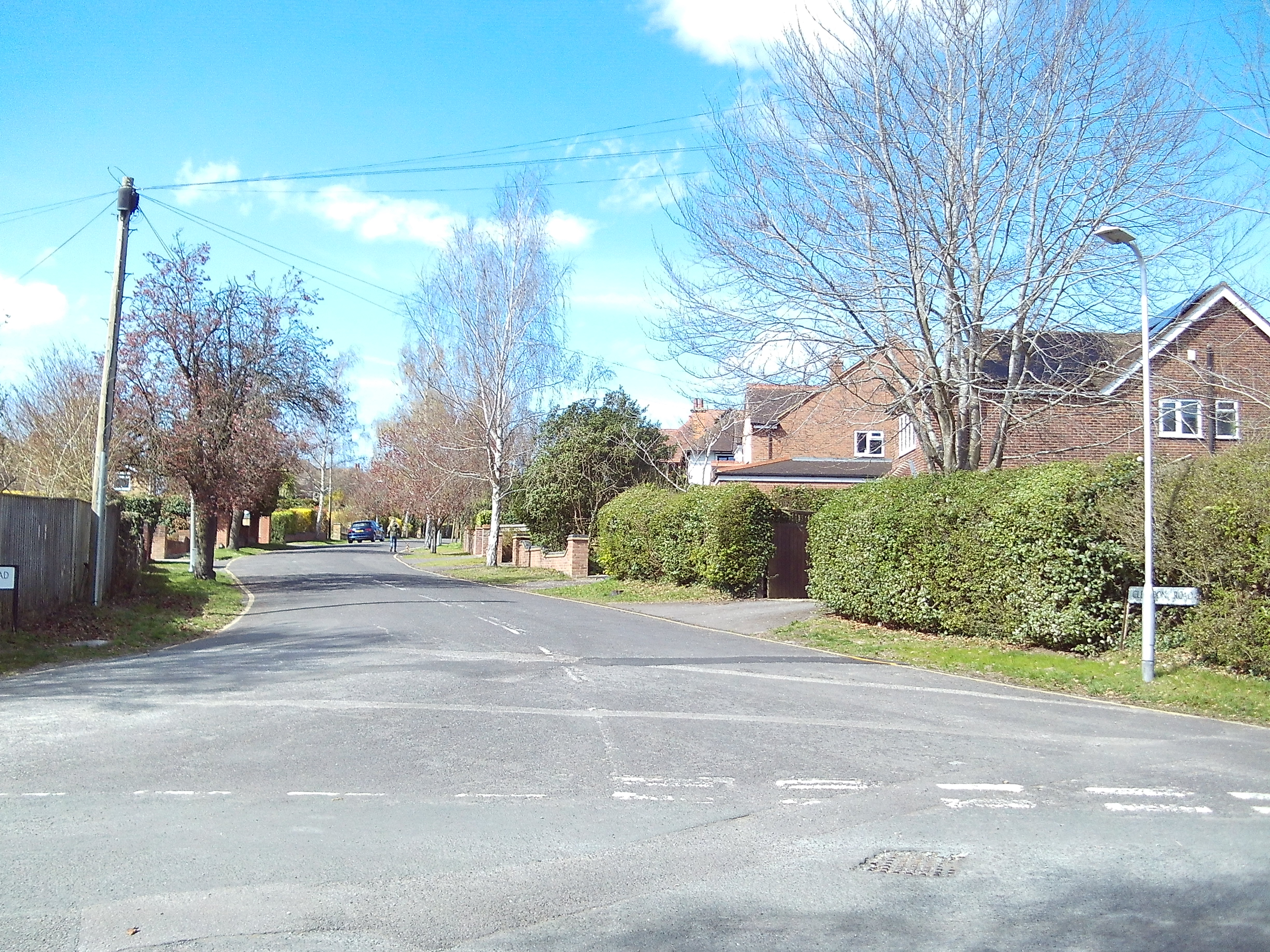
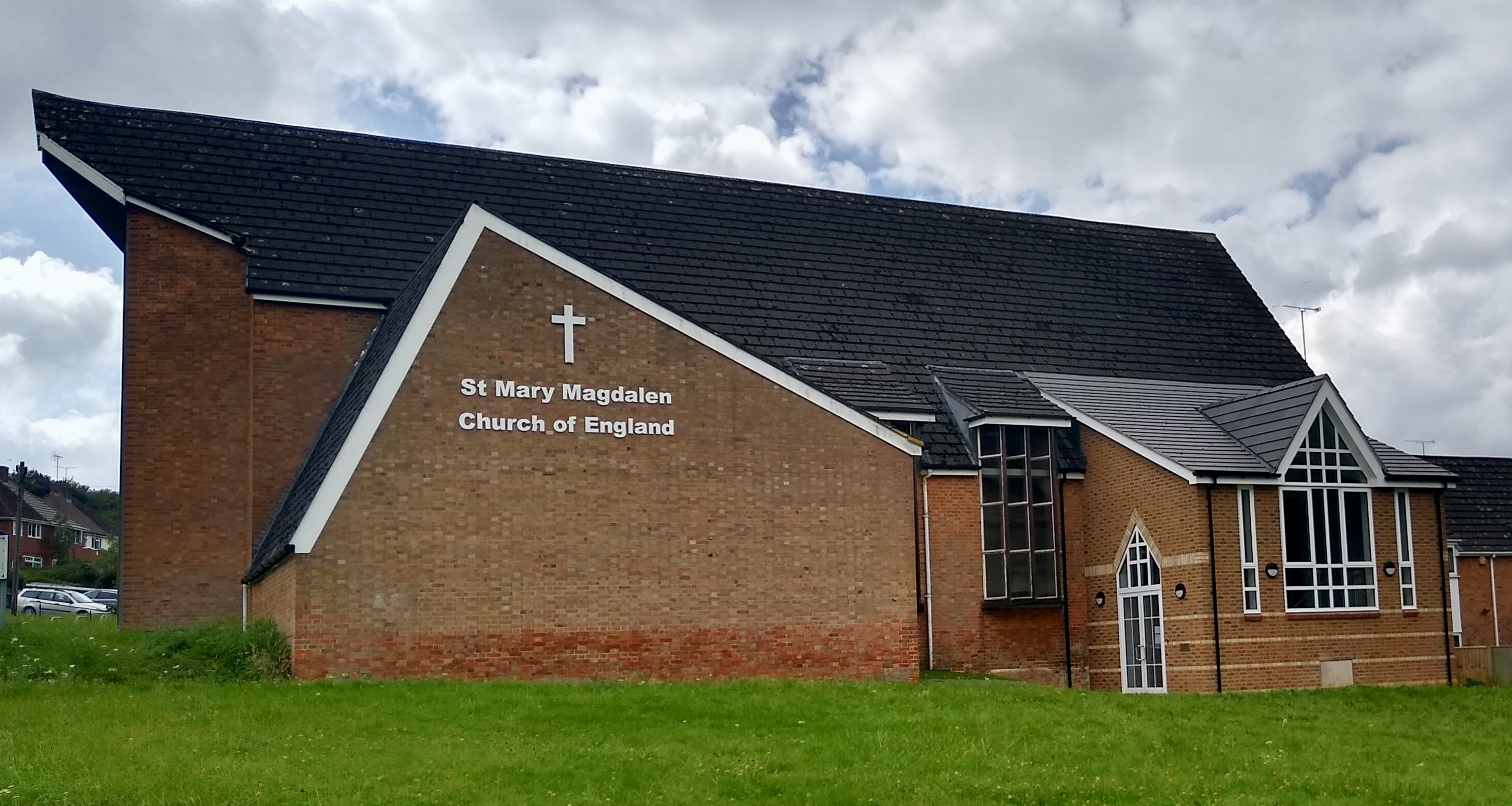
- Clockwise from top left: Roebuck Hotel, Arthur Newbery Park, Church of St Mary Magdalene, Clevedon Road

- Location within Berkshire
- Area: 2.194 km^{2} (0.847 sq mi)
- Population: 9,454
  - Density: 4,309/km^{2} (11,160/sq mi)
- OS grid reference: SU672745
- Unitary authority: Reading
- Ceremonial county: Berkshire
- Region: South East
- Country: England
- Sovereign state: United Kingdom
- Police: Thames Valley
- Fire: Royal Berkshire
- Ambulance: South Central
- UK Parliament: Reading West and Mid Berkshire

Kentwood is an electoral ward of the Borough of Reading, in the English county of Berkshire. It takes its name from Kentwood Hill, a road which bisects the ward.

== Location ==
The ward consists of the northern part of the suburb of Tilehurst, in the west of Reading and south of the River Thames. The ward rises from river level, in the north at some 40 metres (130 ft) AMSL, to the Victoria crossroads, in the south at about 90 metres (300 ft) AMSL.

To the north, the ward boundary follows the Berkshire bank of the Thames from near the former Roebuck Hotel to a point about 500 metres (1,600 ft) east of Scours Lane. It then heads south joining Wigmore Lane and following Norcot Road to the Victoria crossroads. From here it follows Armour Road and Pierce's Hill to Lower Elmstone Drive. Here it meets the borough boundary, which it follows, largely running behind houses, back to the Roebuck.

The ward is bordered by Caversham Heights and Battle wards to the north-east, by Norcot ward to the east, and Tilehurst ward to the south. To the west the ward is bordered by the civil parishes of Tilehurst and Purley on Thames in the district of West Berkshire, and to the north by the civil parish of Mapledurham in the district of South Oxfordshire. It lies entirely within the constituency of Reading West and Mid Berkshire.

== Profile ==
=== Demographics ===
As of 2024, Kentwood ward had an area of 2.098 square kilometres (0.810 sq mi) and there were 9,454 people living there. Of these, 18.4% were under 15 and 17.9% were 65 and over; 78.8% classified themselves as White, 9.1% as Asian, and 5.1% as Black, Caribbean or African; 18.6% were born outside the UK.

The population lived in 3,487 households, of which 8.1% were in a flat, maisonette or apartment, and 91.9% were in a house or bungalow. Of the households, 32.0% were owned outright by the residents, 40.6% were owned subject to a mortgage, loan or shared ownership, 17.7% were privately rented and 9.7% were socially rented.

Of the population aged over 16, 64.5% were in employment, 3.1% were unemployed, and 32.3% were economically inactive. Of those in employment, 45.8% were in managerial, professional or technical occupations. A total of 32.0% of the population were educated to university degree level.

=== Environment ===
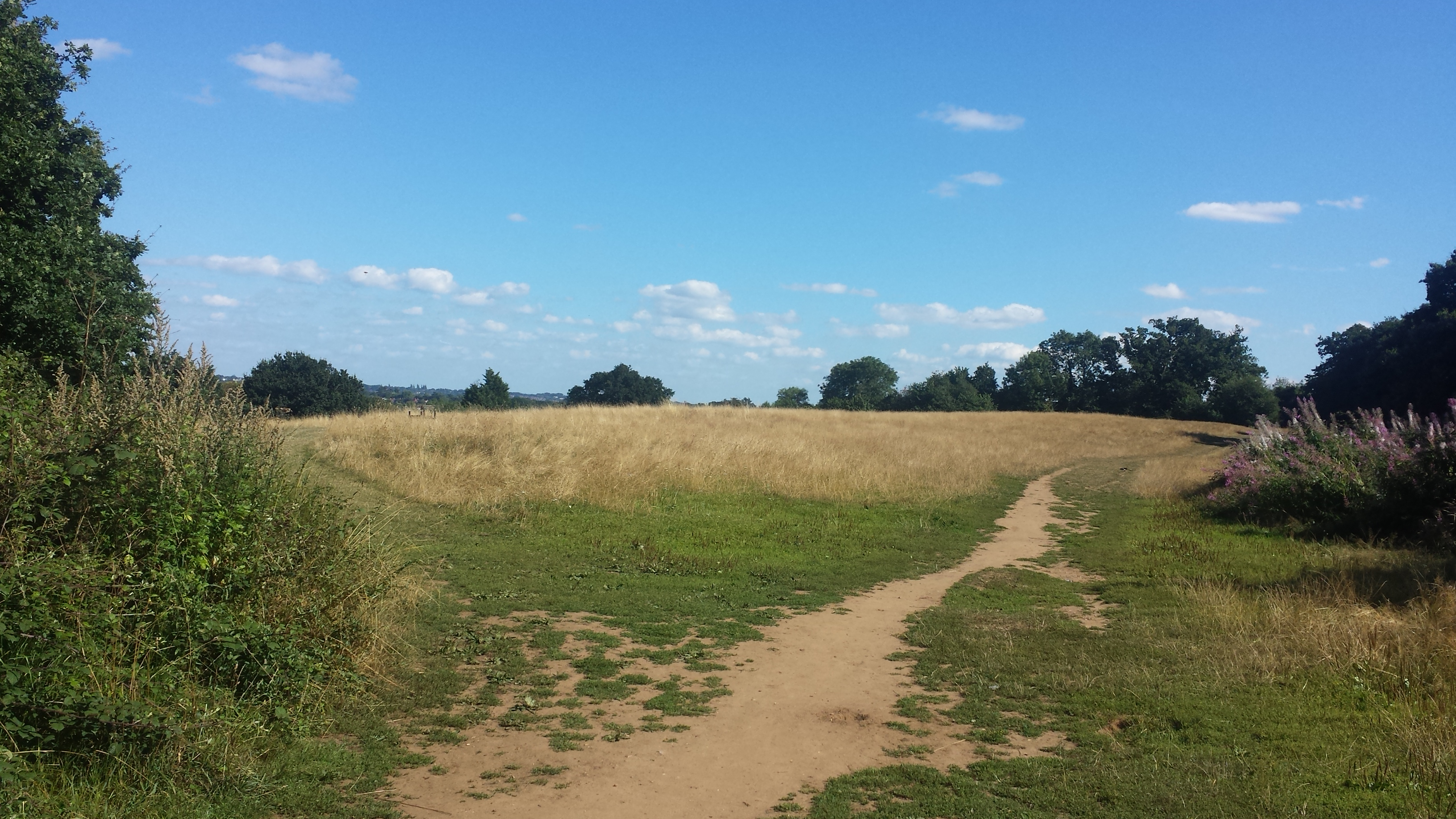
McIlroy Park

As of 2022, Kentwood ward had a tree canopy cover of 22.1%, compared to figures of 17.7% for the Reading as a whole, and 16.5% for the United Kingdom. The principal open spaces in the ward are two sizable parks, McIlroy and Arthur Newbery.

=== Facilities ===
The ward includes Meadow Park primary school. Tilehurst railway station, on the Great Western Main Line, lies near the river in the north of the ward, some distance from the centre of the village it is named after.

== Representation ==
As with all Reading wards, the ward elects three councillors to Reading Borough Council. Elections since 2004 are generally held by thirds, with elections in three years out of four. As of May 2026, the ward councillors are Glenn Dennis and Mark Keeping, both of whom are members of the Labour party, and Raj Singh, a member of the Conservative party.
