= Battle (Reading ward) =

Electoral ward in Reading, Berkshire, England

Coordinates: 51.4597°N 0.9986°W

Battle Ward, Borough of Reading
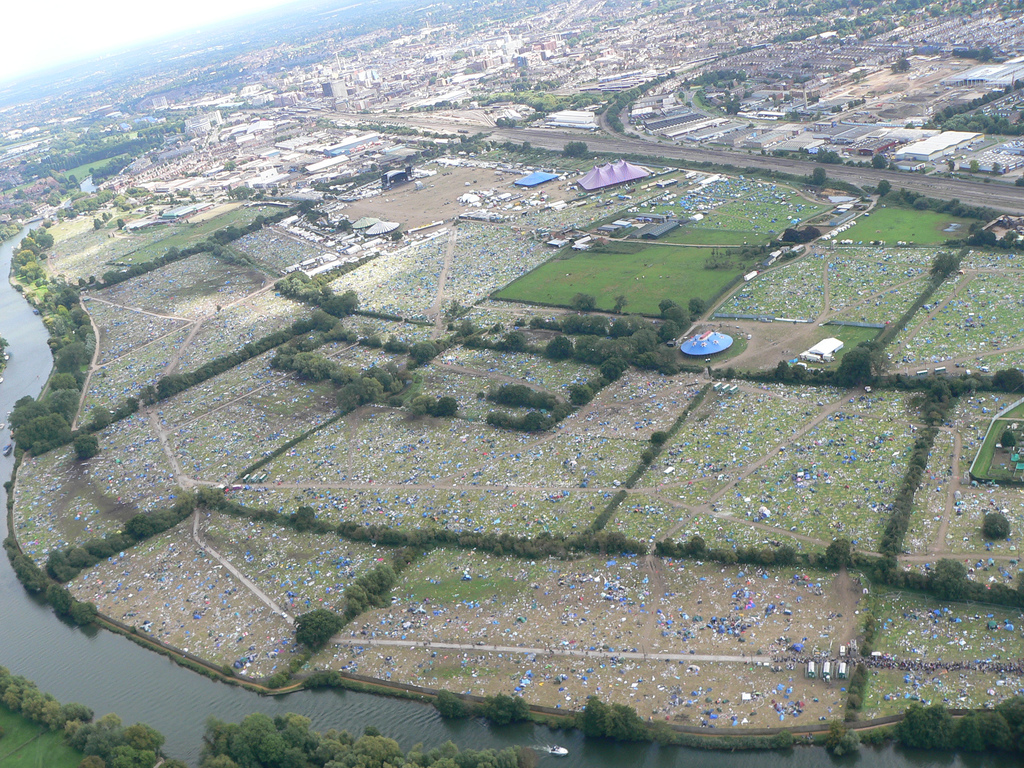
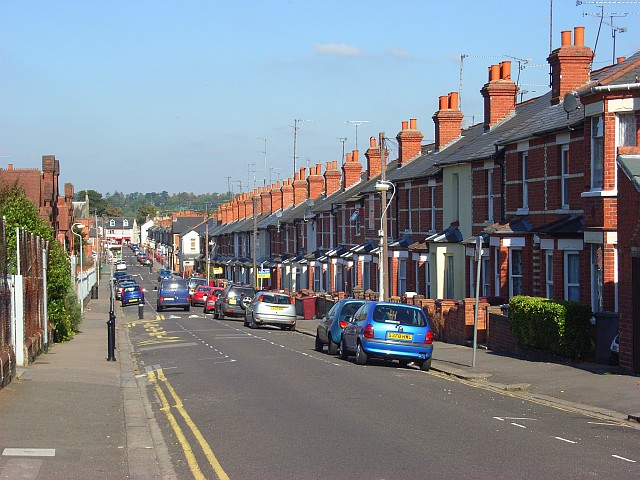
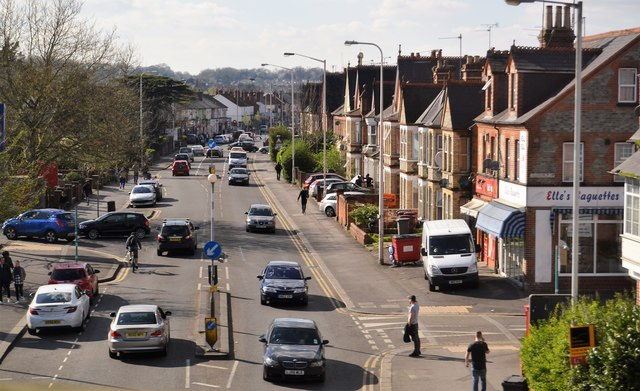
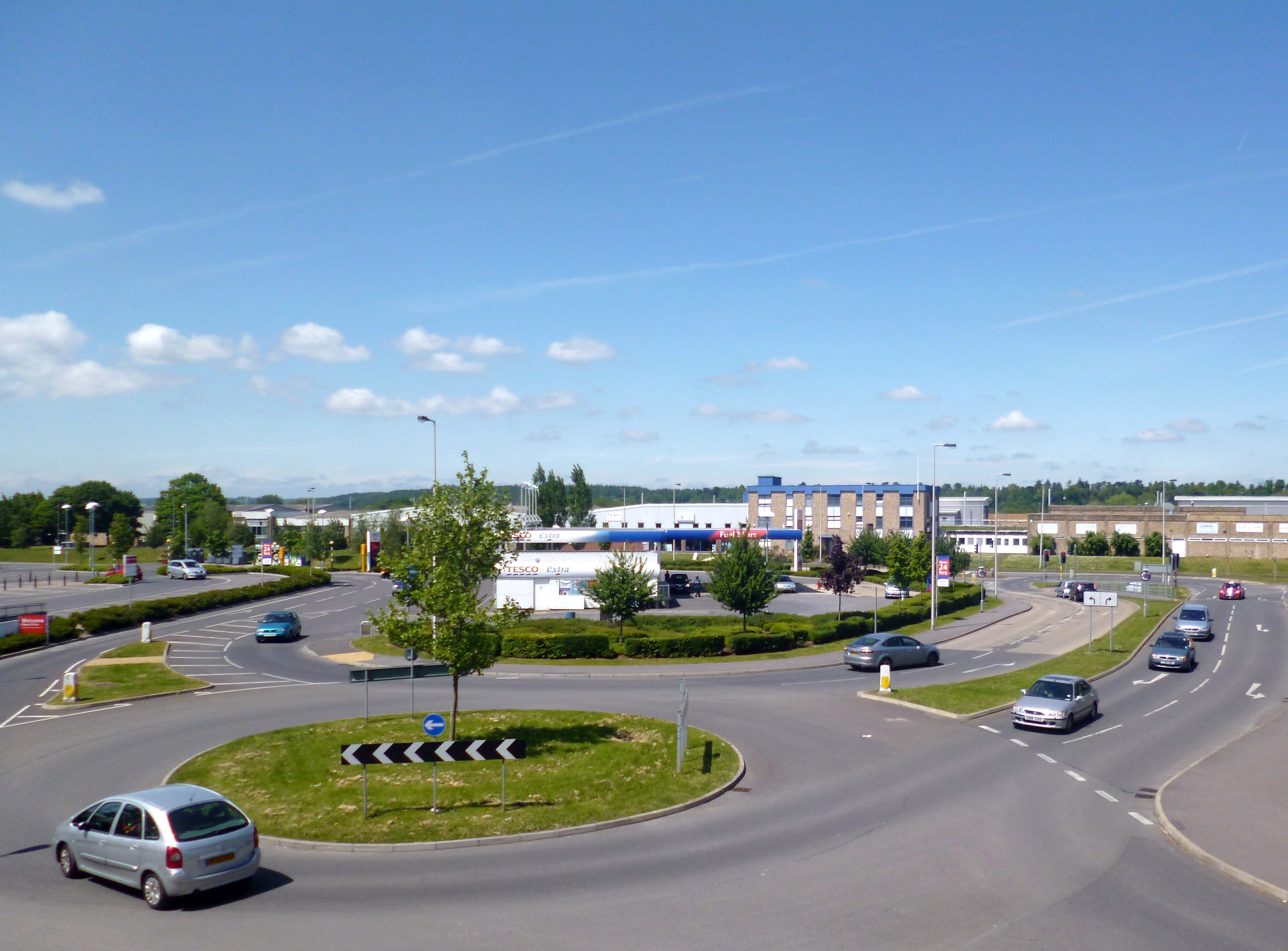
- Clockwise from top left: Reading Festival from the air, Cranbury Road, Portman Road industrial area, Oxford Road from the Reading West railway bridge

- Location within Berkshire
- Area: 2.461 km^{2} (0.950 sq mi)
- Population: 12,384
  - Density: 5,032/km^{2} (13,030/sq mi)
- OS grid reference: SU696739
- Unitary authority: Reading
- Ceremonial county: Berkshire
- Region: South East
- Country: England
- Sovereign state: United Kingdom
- Police: Thames Valley
- Fire: Royal Berkshire
- Ambulance: South Central
- UK Parliament: Reading Central Reading West and Mid-Berkshire

Battle is an electoral ward of the Borough of Reading, in the English county of Berkshire.

The ward takes its name indirectly from the Battle of Hastings and the Norman conquest of England. William the Conqueror gave land in and around Reading to his foundation of Battle Abbey, and this led to the naming of Battle Farm and the, now closed, Battle Hospital, both of which were within the ward's boundary.

== Location ==
The ward is situated to the west of the town centre, and encompasses much of the neighbourhood of West Reading. It also includes a large area of uninhabited flood plain between the railway and the River Thames that is best known as the site of Reading Festival, whilst the extensive Portman Road industrial area sits just south of the railway.

Starting at the River Thames in the north and proceeding clockwise, the ward boundary follows the river east to Cow Lane. It then follows Cow Lane south to the Didcot railway line, which it follows east before doubling back along the Newbury line as far as the Tilehurst Road Bridge. From there, it follows Tilehurst Road and Waverley Road, before continuing along the rear boundaries of properties on the western side of Wantage Road to Oxford Road. The boundary then follows Oxford Road west to Norcot Roundabout, where it returns to the River Thames approximately 500 metres (1,600 ft) east of Scours Lane.

In the same order as above, the ward is bordered by Caversham Heights, Thames, Abbey, Coley, Southcote, Norcot and Kentwood wards. Most of the ward lies within the parliamentary constituency of Reading Central, although two small portions at its western boundary are within Reading West and Mid Berkshire.

== Profile ==
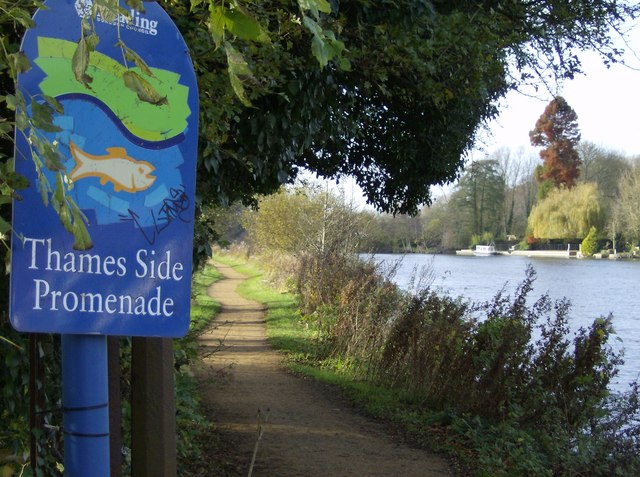
The end of Thameside Promenade, with the Thames Path continuing along the northern boundary of the ward

=== Demographics ===
The ward covers a large stretch of the town's Oxford Road and its largely terraced side streets. As of 2024, Battle ward had an area of 2.461 square kilometres (0.950 sq mi) and there were 12,384 people living there. Of these, 20.3% were under 15 and 6.6% were 65 and over; 56.1% classified themselves as White, 22.9% as Asian, and 11.0% as Black, Caribbean or African; 47.8% were born outside the UK.

The population lived in 4,328 households, of which 36.7% were in a flat, maisonette or apartment, and 62.7% were in a house or bungalow. Of the households, 15.2% were owned outright by the residents, 28.5% were owned subject to a mortgage, loan or shared ownership, 45.1% were privately rented and 11.2% were socially rented.

Of the population aged over 16, 70.6% were in employment, 4.4% were unemployed, and 25.0% were economically inactive. Of those in employment, 37.4% were in managerial, professional or technical occupations. A total of 35.2% of the population were educated to university degree level.

=== Environment ===
As of 2022, Battle ward had a tree canopy cover of 7.4%, compared to figures of 17.7% for the Reading as a whole, and 16.5% for the United Kingdom. The part of the ward to the north of the railway line is private farmland, with the Thameside Promenade and the Thames Path following the river bank. To the south of the railway the only significant open space is the rather small Kensington Park, although the larger Prospect Park borders the ward to its south.

=== Facilities ===
The ward includes Battle Primary Academy, Cranbury College and St Edward's Preparatory School, but no secondary schools.

== Representation ==
As with all Reading wards, the ward elects three councillors to Reading Borough Council. Elections since 2004 are generally held by thirds, with elections in three years out of four. The ward councillors are currently Wendy Griffith, Amjad Tarar and Pratikshya Gurung, who are all members of the Labour party.
