= Tilehurst (Reading ward) =

Electoral ward in Berkshire, England

Coordinates: 51.455974°N 1.031853°W

Tilehurst Ward, Borough of Reading
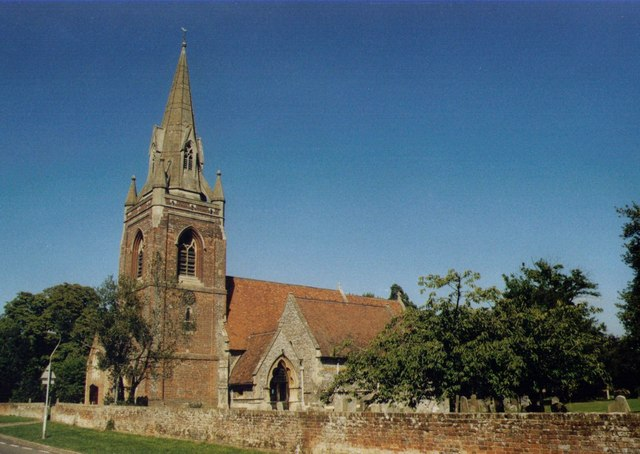
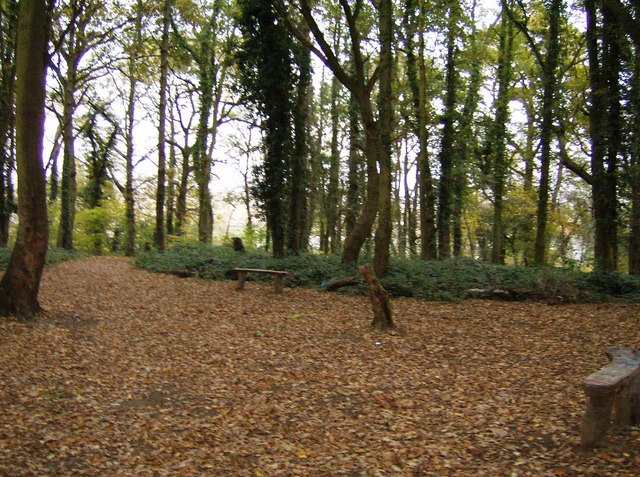
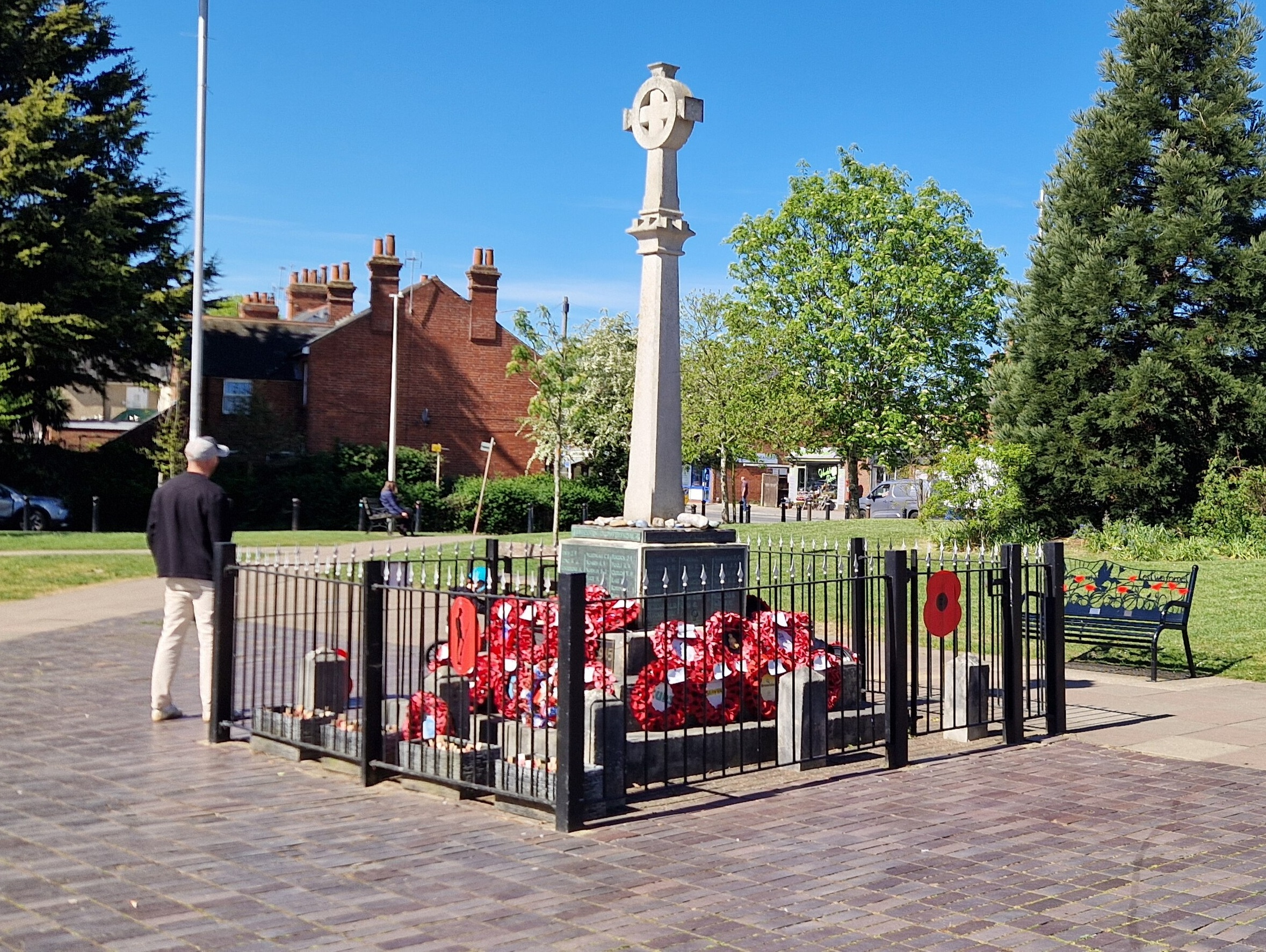
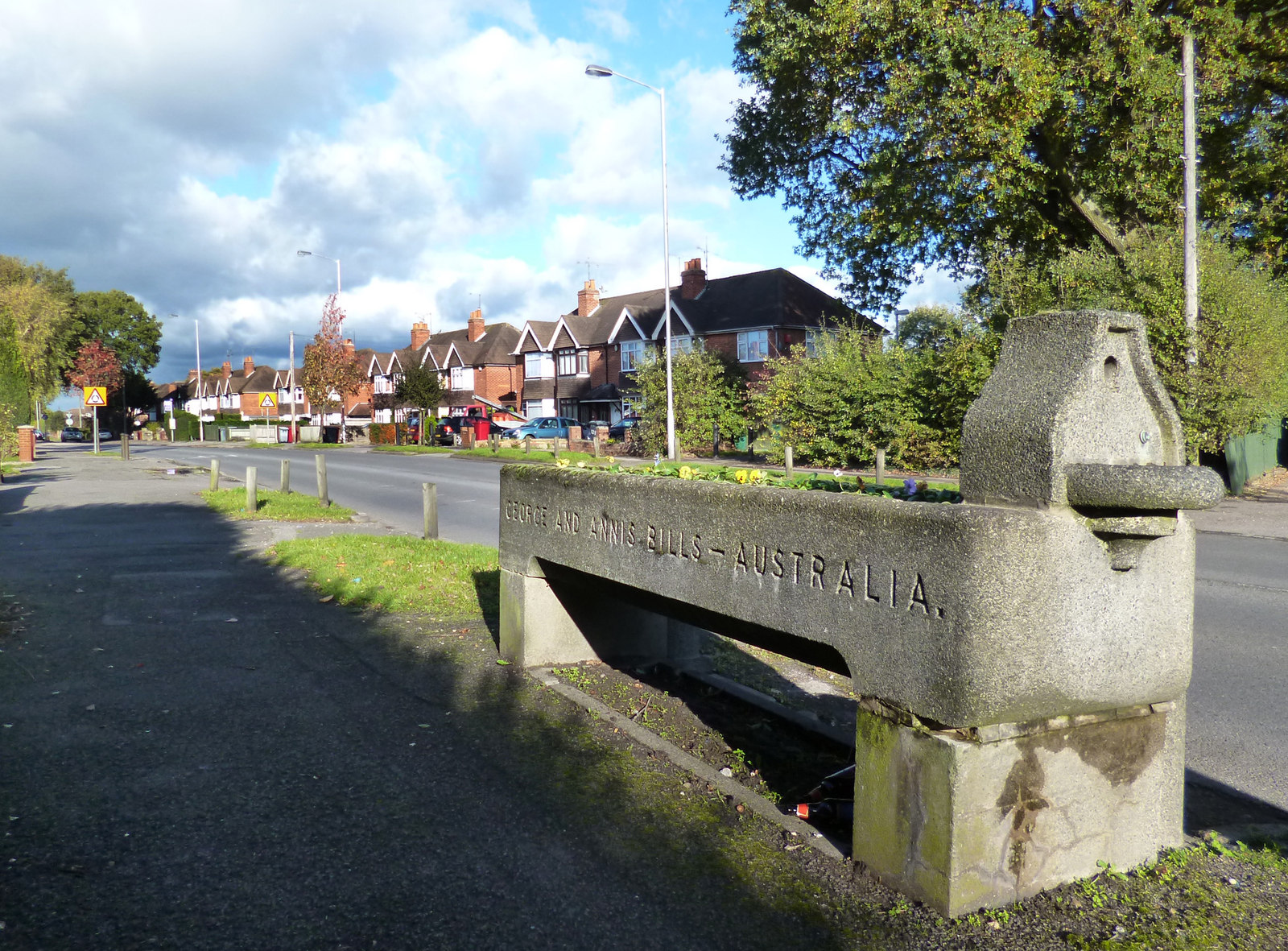
- Clockwise from top left: St Michael's Church, Lousehill Copse, Water trough on Park Lane, Tilehurst War Memorial

- Location within Berkshire
- Area: 2.098 km^{2} (0.810 sq mi)
- Population: 9,870
  - Density: 4,704/km^{2} (12,180/sq mi)
- OS grid reference: SU6773
- Unitary authority: Reading
- Ceremonial county: Berkshire
- Region: South East
- Country: England
- Sovereign state: United Kingdom
- Police: Thames Valley
- Fire: Royal Berkshire
- Ambulance: South Central
- UK Parliament: Reading West and Mid Berkshire

Tilehurst is an electoral ward of the Borough of Reading, in the English county of Berkshire. It forms part of the larger Reading suburb of Tilehurst, which also includes parts of other borough wards plus the civil parish of Tilehurst Without, which is outside the borough boundary in the district of West Berkshire.

== Location ==
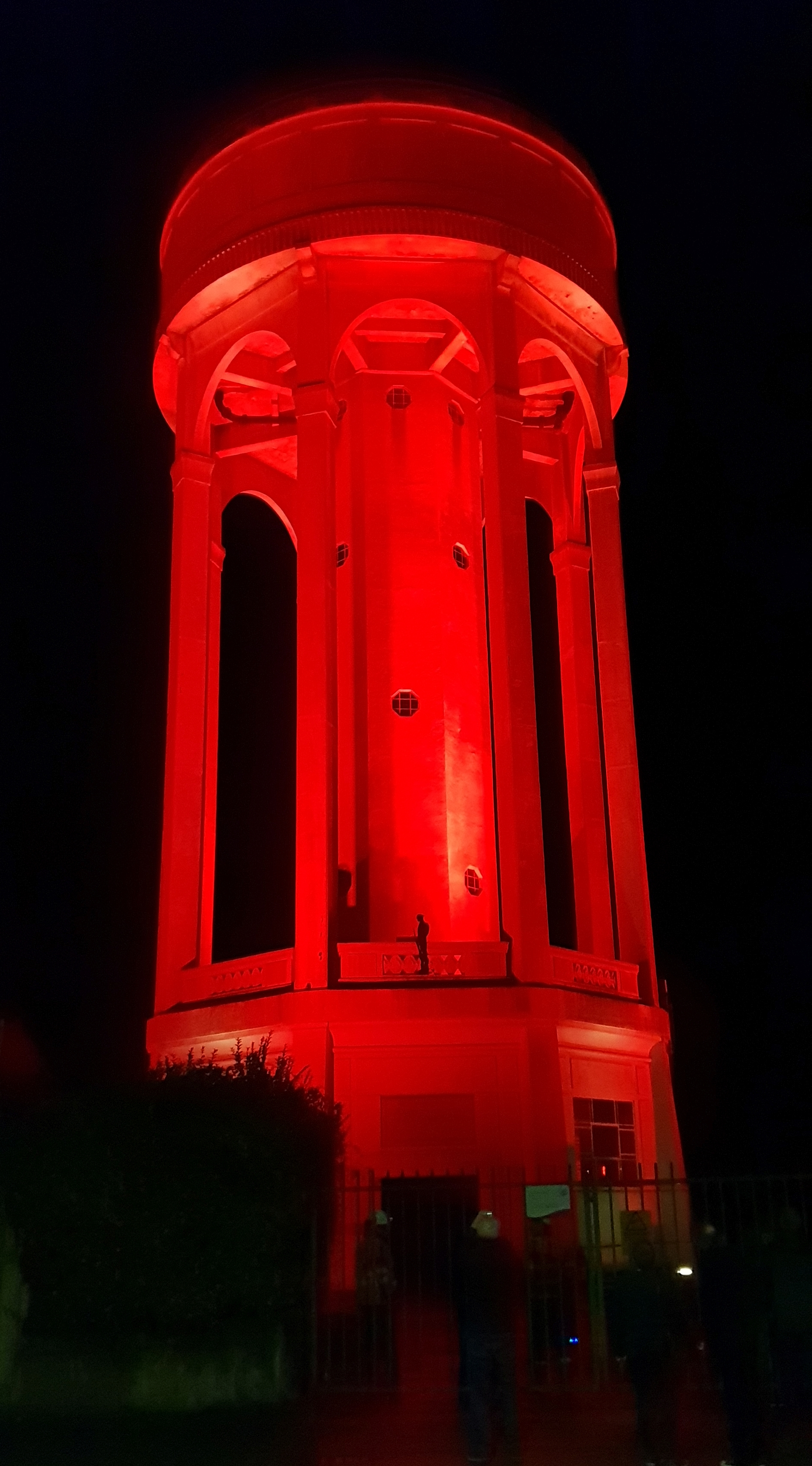
Tilehurst Water Tower lit in poppy red for the 100th anniversary of the Armistice

The ward lies on the western boundary of the Borough of Reading, adjacent to the district of West Berkshire. It includes the highest point of both the borough and the town, which lies at 100 metres (330 ft) AMSL in the area surrounding the Tilehurst Water Tower.

From the south in clockwise order the ward is bounded by New Lane Hill, the Meadway, Halls Road, Pierce's Hill, Armour Road, Norcot Road, and Dee Road. Between Halls Road and Pierce's Hill the boundary follows the borough boundary, away from roads, but including a significant area of housing to the west of Park Lane and School Road. Between Norcot Road and Dee Road, the boundary follows the ridge line through Lousehill Copse. Again from Dee Road back to New Lane Hill the boundary eschews roads, but does include The Avenue and Churchend schools and St Michael's church within the ward.

The ward is bordered, in the same order as above, by the civil parish of Tilehurst Without, in West Berkshire, and the borough wards of Kentwood, Norcot and Southcote. It lies entirely within the constituency of Reading West and Mid Berkshire.

== Profile ==
=== Demographics ===
As of 2024, Tilehurst ward had an area of 2.098 square kilometres (0.810 sq mi) and there were 9,956 people living there. Of these, 19.3% were under 15 and 19.8% were 65 and over; 81.3% classified themselves as White, 8.2% as Asian, and 5.0% as Black, Caribbean or African; 14.8% were born outside the UK.

The population lived in 3,937 households, of which 14.8% were in a flat, maisonette or apartment, and 85.2% were in a house or bungalow. Of the households, 36.8% were owned outright by the residents, 34.6% were owned subject to a mortgage, loan or shared ownership, 14.7% were privately rented and 13.9% were socially rented.

Of the population aged over 16, 60.6% were in employment, 3.2% were unemployed, and 36.1% were economically inactive. Of those in employment, 44.6% were in managerial, professional or technical occupations. A total of 29.2% of the population were educated to university degree level.

=== Environment ===
As of 2022, Tilehurst ward had a tree canopy cover of 19.1%, compared to figures of 17.7% for the Reading as a whole, and 16.5% for the United Kingdom. Open space in the ward is limited, but includes Blundells Copse and most of Lousehill Copse local nature reserves.

=== Facilities ===
The ward includes Churchend, English Martyrs, Moorlands and Park Lane primary schools, together with the Avenue and Thames Valley special schools, but there are no secondary schools. St Michael's parish church is within the ward, as is the Tilehurst Village Hall and the Tilehurst branch of Reading Borough Libraries.

The ward includes the generally accepted centre of the village of Tilehurst, with two closely adjacent retail clusters around Tilehurst Triangle and Victoria cross-roads. The Victoria cross-road cluster includes a post office, providing a full set of services. Since the closure of the NatWest branch in 2023, there are no longer any banking facilities in either the ward or the larger village, despite a campaign run by local Liberal Democrat councillors.

== Representation ==
As with all Reading wards, the ward elects three councillors to Reading Borough Council. Elections since 2004 are generally held by thirds, with elections in three years out of four. Tilehurst ward has strongly supported the Liberal Democrats over the years, with 22 of the 25 vacancies since 2000 being filled by members of that party. As of May 2026, the ward councillors are James Moore, Meri O'Connell and Anne Thompson, all of whom are members of the Liberal Democrat party.
