= Norcot =

Area of Tilehurst in Berkshire, England

Coordinates: 51.460°N 1.027°W

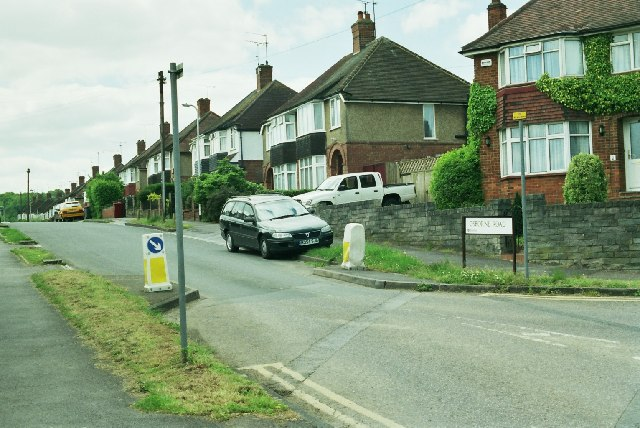
- Osborne Road

- Location within Berkshire
- OS grid reference: SU6873
- Unitary authority: Reading
- Ceremonial county: Berkshire
- Region: South East
- Country: England
- Sovereign state: United Kingdom
- Post town: Reading
- Postcode district: RG31
- Dialling code: 0118
- Police: Thames Valley
- Fire: Royal Berkshire
- Ambulance: South Central
- UK Parliament: Reading West and Mid Berkshire

Norcot is an area of the village of Tilehurst on the outskirts of Reading, in the county of Berkshire, England. It extends up Norcot Hill from Norcot Junction on the Oxford Road towards the village centre of Tilehurst.

== Location and origins ==
As a commonly used suburban area name, Norcot centres on Norcot Road and the upper Oxford Road on Norcot Hill. All these areas form a mixture of suburban and urban parts of West Reading. The original hamlet was near the junction of Norcot Road and Romany Lane and was largely made up of Norcot Farm in the north-east of old Tilehurst parish. The name means 'North Cottage' and has a southern neighbour Southcote, below Tilehurst church and manor.

== Buildings and structures ==
The Norcot Water Tower, built at the end of the 19th century, is somewhat older than the more prominent Tilehurst Water Tower. It is 50ft high, a Grade II listed building and since 2002 has been converted into a luxury apartment. Norcot School was built in 1906. In its lifetime, it was both a senior and a junior school. It closed in 1989. Like much of Tilehurst, Norcot Hill was used for the extraction of clay for brickmaking. In the 1920s, S. E. Collier's transported the clay via overhead cables to their main site in the Dee Road area of Tilehurst. St George's Church, Reading was built on the north-eastern edge of Norcot in 1886, largely to service the soldiers of the nearby Brock Barracks. Norcot Mission Church was started in 1929 to serve the new Norcot council estate. It started in a hut on land rented from the Pulsometer Engineering Works. The church moved to a permanent building in Brockley Close in 1972. The post office is on the Oxford Road.

== Government ==
As a neighbourhood, Norcot is electorally partly in Norcot ward and partly in Kentwood ward to its west. It lies within the constituency of Reading West and Mid Berkshire.
