= Norcot (Reading ward) =

Electoral ward in Berkshire, England

Coordinates: 51.45212°N 1.02074°W

Norcot Ward, Borough of Reading
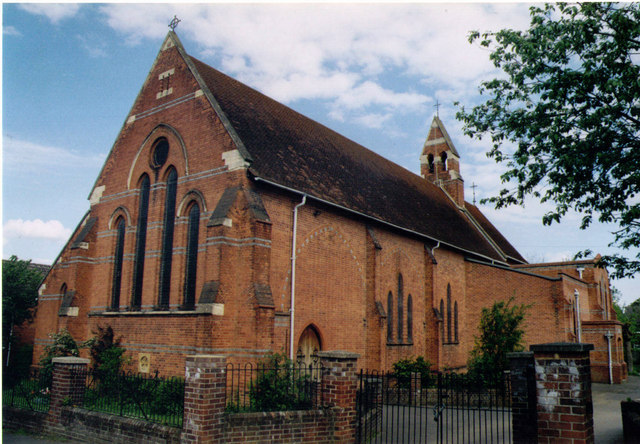
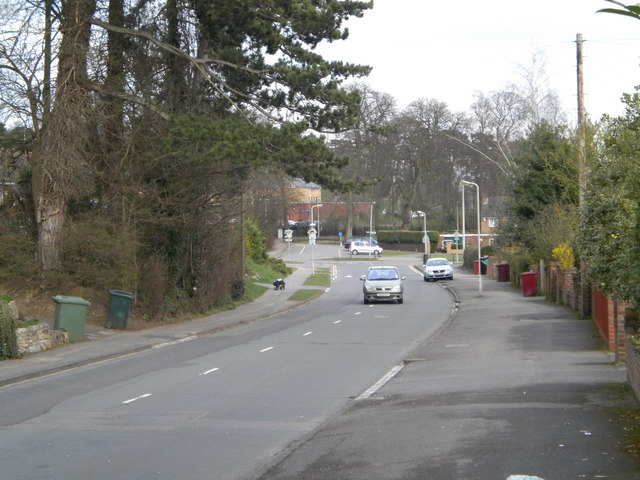
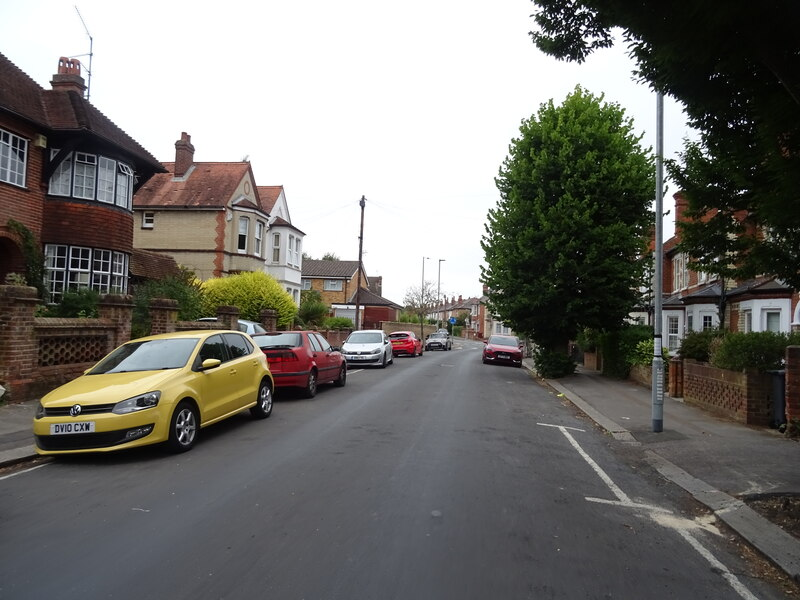
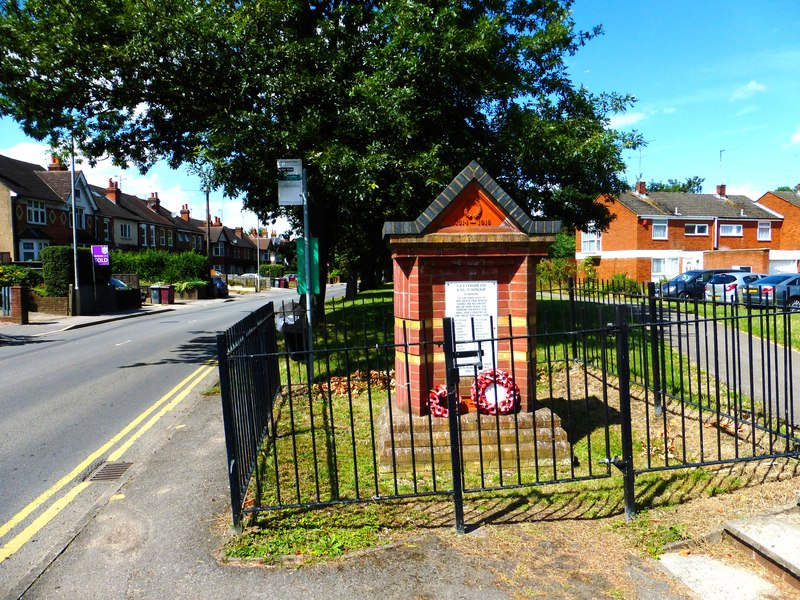
- Clockwise from top left: St George's Church, Cockney Hill, Memorial on Water Road, Waverley Road

- Location within Berkshire
- Area: 1.628 km^{2} (0.629 sq mi)
- Population: 11,965
  - Density: 7,350/km^{2} (19,000/sq mi)
- OS grid reference: SU680731
- Unitary authority: Reading
- Ceremonial county: Berkshire
- Region: South East
- Country: England
- Sovereign state: United Kingdom
- Police: Thames Valley
- Fire: Royal Berkshire
- Ambulance: South Central
- UK Parliament: Reading West and Mid Berkshire

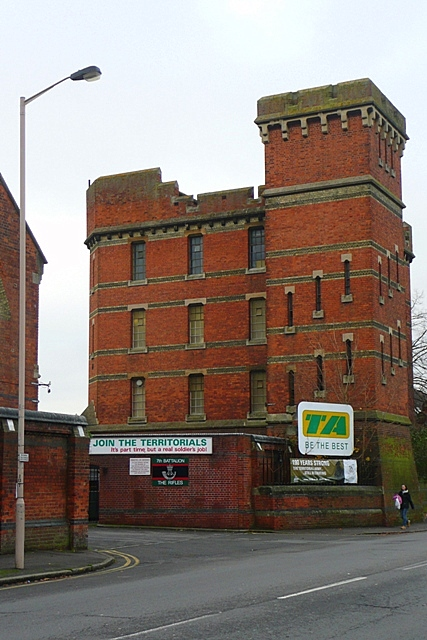
The keep at Brock Barracks

Norcot is an electoral ward of the Borough of Reading, in the English county of Berkshire.

== Location ==
Norcot ward is the far eastern section of the Reading borough portion of the village of Tilehurst, where it merges into the western end of the more inner urban West Reading and the northern end of the suburb of Southcote. The neighborhood of Norcot, from which the ward takes its name, is smaller and less well defined than the ward, and is also split between Norcot and Kentwood wards.

From the north-west in clockwise order the ward is bounded by Norcot Road, Oxford Road, the backs of the houses on the west side of Wantage Road, Wilson Road, Wantage Road, Waverley Road, Tilehurst Road and Honey End Lane. From Honey End Lane, the boundary threads its way behind houses between Hogarth Avenue and Cockney Hill, before joining Usk Road. From Usk Road, the boundary follows another back of houses route to Dee Road. From Dee Road, it follows the ridge line through Lousehill Copse back to Norcot Road.

The ward is bordered, in the same order as above, by Kentwood, Battle, Southcote and Tilehurst wards. It lies largely within the constituency of Reading West and Mid Berkshire, although a small portion (south of Cockney Hill) is in Reading Central.

== Profile ==
=== Demographics ===
As of 2024, Norcot ward had an area of 1.628 square kilometres (0.629 sq mi) and there were 11,965 people living there. Of these, 21.2% were under 15 and 13.2% were 65 and over; 69.1% classified themselves as White, 12.6% as Asian, and 9.4% as Black, Caribbean or African; 29.0% were born outside the UK.

The population lived in 4,588 households, of which 28.4% were in a flat, maisonette or apartment, and 71.6% were in a house or bungalow. Of the households, 19.9% were owned outright by the residents, 32.3% were owned subject to a mortgage, loan or shared ownership, 24.4% were privately rented and 23.4% were socially rented.

Of the population aged over 16, 63.9% were in employment, 3.7% were unemployed, and 32.3% were economically inactive. Of those in employment, 41.6% were in managerial, professional or technical occupations. A total of 32.6% of the population were educated to university degree level.

=== Environment ===
As of 2022, Norcot ward had a tree canopy cover of 15.7%, compared to figures of 17.7% for the Reading as a whole, and 16.5% for the United Kingdom. There is no significant open space within the ward, although its southern edge does abut the large Prospect Park.

=== Facilities ===
The ward includes King's Academy Prospect secondary school, and St Michaels, Ranikhet and Wilson primary schools. Brock Barracks are also within the ward.

== Representation ==
As with all Reading wards, the ward elects three councillors to Reading Borough Council. Elections since 2004 are generally held by thirds, with elections in three years out of four. As of May 2026, the ward councillors are Alison Foster, Finn McGoldrick and Mamuna Naz, all of whom are members of the Labour party.
