= Little Heath, Berkshire =

Area of Tilehurst, Berkshire, England

Coordinates: 51.458427°N 1.054967°W

Little Heath
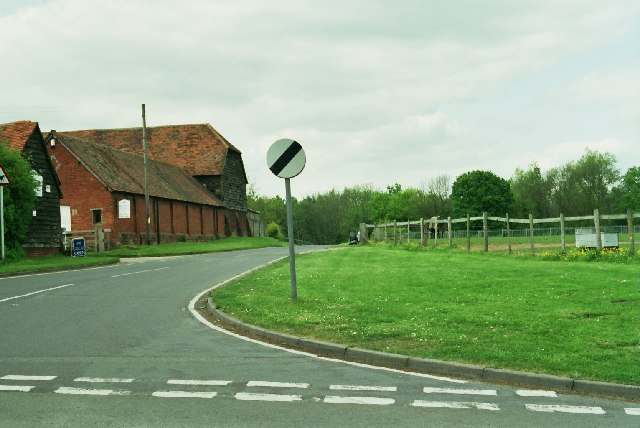
- Stables and Sulham Hill

- Location within Berkshire
- OS grid reference: SU656737
- Civil parish: Tilehurst
- Unitary authority: West Berkshire
- Ceremonial county: Berkshire
- Region: South East
- Country: England
- Sovereign state: United Kingdom
- Police: Thames Valley
- Fire: Royal Berkshire
- Ambulance: South Central
- UK Parliament: Reading West and Mid Berkshire

Little Heath is a village near Tilehurst in the West Berkshire borough of Berkshire, England. It borders Reading and the town's wider borough.

== Government ==
Little Heath is within that part of Tilehurst, sometimes known as Tilehurst Without, that lies outside the borough boundaries of Reading. It therefore lies within the civil parish of Tilehurst in the area of the unitary authority of West Berkshire.

Like the rest of Tilehurst, Little Heath falls within the Reading West and Mid Berkshire. Prior to Brexit in 2020, it was represented by the South East England constituency for the European Parliament.

== School ==
Little Heath is the home of Little Heath School, a voluntary aided co-educational comprehensive secondary school that serves the local area on both sides of the borough boundary.
