= Tilehurst (civil parish) =

Coordinates: 51°27′24″N 1°03′06″W

Tilehurst Without
- Civil parish
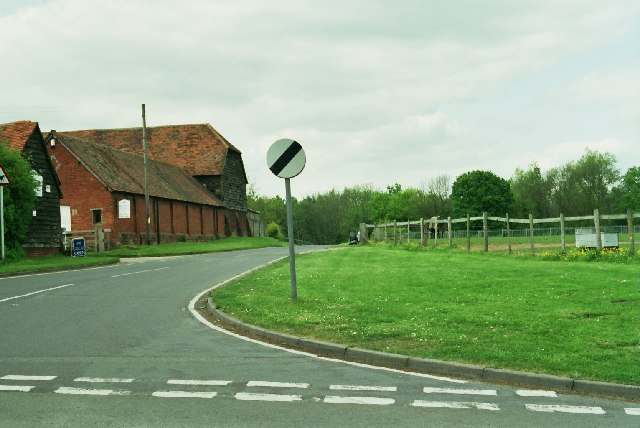
- Hall Place Farm

- Location within Berkshire
- Population: 14,312 (2021 census)
- OS grid reference: SU6573
- Unitary authority: West Berkshire
- Ceremonial county: Berkshire
- Region: South East
- Country: England
- Sovereign state: United Kingdom
- Police: Thames Valley
- Fire: Royal Berkshire
- Ambulance: South Central
- UK Parliament: Reading West and Mid Berkshire

Tilehurst, or Tilehurst Without, is a civil parish in Berkshire, England. It includes that part of the Reading suburb of Tilehurst that lies outside the Reading Borough boundary, together with the northern part of the adjoining suburb of Calcot, and a small rural area west of the two suburbs.

The parish is bordered by the Borough of Reading, and the West Berkshire civil parishes of Holybrook, Theale, Sulham, and Purley on Thames. It lies entirely within the Reading West and Mid Berkshire parliamentary constituency.

== Demographics ==
At the 2021 census, the parish had 14,312 residents in 5,718 households.

Census population of Tilehurst parish
Census	Population	Female	Male	Households	Source
2001	14,683	7,360	7,323	5,571	
2011	14,064	7,134	6,930	5,534	
2021	14,312	7,288	7,024	5,718	

At the 2001 census, the ratio of employed to unemployed residents was approximately 10:1. In addition to this 24% of residents who are neither employed nor unemployed but "economically inactive". The average working resident worked approximately 40 hours per week in managerial or professional employment.

Ib 2001 the mean age of a parish resident was 37.47; the median was 38.00.

Age profile of Tilehurst parish in 2001
Age group	Number of residents
0–4	872
5–15	2,326
16–24	1,380
25–44	4,384
45–64	3,904
65–74	1,169
75+	648
