= Peter Vanlore =

Dutch-born English merchant, jeweller and moneylender

Sir Peter Vanlore
- Born: Pieter van Loor c. 1547; Utrecht, Netherlands
- Died: 6 September 1627 (aged 80); Calcot, Berkshire, England
- Resting place: Lady Chapel, Church of St Michael, Tilehurst
- Occupations: Merchant, jeweller and moneylender
- Spouse: Jacoba Teighbott or Thibault
- Children: Peter Vanlore; Jacoba Vanlore; Elizabeth Vanlore; Anne Vanlore; Mary Vanlore; Catherine Vanlore
- Parent(s): Maurits van Loor and Stephania

Sir Peter Vanlore (c. 1547 – 6 September 1627) was a Dutch-born English merchant, jeweller and moneylender in Elizabethan and Stuart England.

== Biography ==
Naturalization of Peter Vanlore Act 1609
- Act of Parliament
- Parliament of England
- Long title: An Act for the naturalizing of Peter Vanloore of Fanchurch-street, London, merchant.
- Citation: 7 Jas. 1. c. 24 Pr.
- Territorial extent: England and Wales

Dates
- Royal assent: 23 July 1610
- Commencement: 9 February 1610 (Note: Start of session.)

Status: Current legislation

He was born circa 1547 in Utrecht, Netherlands, the third son of Maurits van Loor and his wife Stephania; Maurits Van Loor had a brother named Dirk Van Loor, and a sister named Marietje Van Loor. The parents of Maurits were Pieter Van Loor and Barbara Bolart. About 1568, he moved to England. On or before 19 July 1585, while living in the parish of St Benet Sherehog, he married Jacoba, daughter of Henry Teighbott or Thibault. He bought the manor of Tilehurst in Berkshire from Thomas Crompton in 1604 and also owned Wallingford Castle. He built and lived in a mansion at Calcot Park, which replaced the original manor house of Tilehurst. He was naturalised in 1610.

Vanlore died at his home on 6 September 1627 and was buried in an elaborate tomb in the Ladychapel, St Michael's, Tilehurst.

== Jewellery career ==
In 1586, Peter Vanlore sold a brooch with the portrait of Elizabeth I carved in an agate and set with 53 diamonds to the Earl of Rutland for £80. Vanlore was involved in the purchase and cutting of two expensive diamonds for Elizabeth I in 1596. In August 1601 he supplied a jewel with three fine pearls and fine stones from the East to Sir Robert Cecil.

Vanlore supplied a diamond with a pendant pearl and a "paragon ruby" ring to King James for £760 on 1 January 1604 He also sold James a jewel with a large table ruby and two lozenge diamonds, and James sent Sir Thomas Knyvet to deliver a parcel of Queen Elizabeth's jewels in part-payment. These jewels probably featured in The Masque of Indian and China Knights at Hampton Court on New Year's Day. Dudley Carleton seems to have over-valued the jewel at £40,000.

He sold a large diamond and a dozen diamond buttons to the Earl of Hertford for his embassy to Brussels in 1605, costing £3,450. After the death of Anne of Denmark in 1619 Vanlore advanced £18,000 on some of her jewels to pay the costs of the king's summer progress.

Vanlore was considered an authority on international finance. In 1610 he told the lawyer and newsletter writer Walter Pye that the annual income of Frederick V of the Palatinate, the new husband of Princess Elizabeth, was £200,000.

He died in 1627.

== Family ==
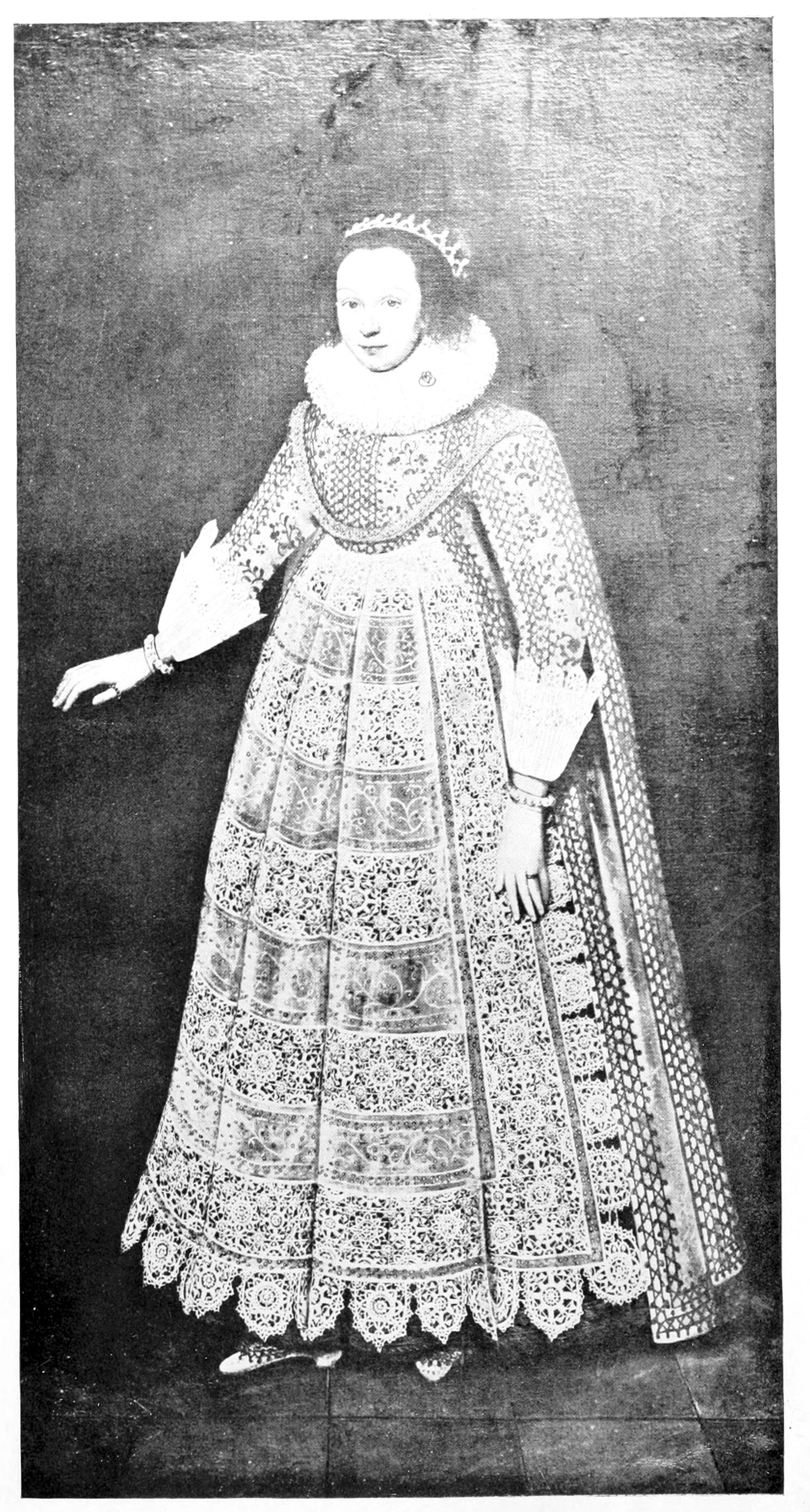
Anne Vanlore

He married Jacoba Teighbott or Thibault on or before 19 July 1585, by whom he had 11 children including:

- Sir Peter Vanlore, 1st Baronet, bapt. 1586, who married Susanna Becke of Antwerp, by whom he had a son and three daughters; Jacoba who married Henry Zinzan (son of Sir Sigismund Zinzan) and Susanna, who married Robert Croke, MP, and Mary, who married Henry Alexander, 3rd Earl of Stirling.
- Jacoba Vanlore, bapt 1587, who married Johannes de Laeda
- Elizabeth Vanlore, who married Hans van den Bernden
- Anne Vanlore, who married Sir Charles Caesar
- Mary Vanlore, who married Sir Edward Powell, 1st Baronet, and was a direct ancestor of Margaret Thatcher
- Catherine Vanlore, who married Sir Thomas Glemham
