= Tayo Sound =

- Born: Prince Tayo Adeoluwa Isaiah Oyekan; 13 February 2002 (age 24); Reading, England
- Genres: Alternative pop
- Instruments: Vocals; guitar
- Years active: 2012–present
- Labels: Black Butter Records; Arista Records

Tayo Adeoluwa Isaiah Oyekan (born 13 February 2002), known professionally as Tayo Sound, is a British singer-songwriter and guitarist from Reading. Signed to Arista Records's Black Butter imprint, he released a number of singles, starting with "Cold Feet" (2020), and the EP Runaway (2021). He has since collaborated with the likes of Rudimental and Pixey.

== Early life ==
Oyekan was born in Reading, Berkshire to a Scottish mother and a Scottish-Nigerian father and grew up in the suburb of Tilehurst. His father was a pastor. Oyekan attended Birch Copse Primary School and Little Heath School. He left school at age 16 after completing his GCSEs to pursue music.

== Career ==
Under his own name Tayo Oyekan at age 10, he was a 2012 Has Reading Got Talent? finalist and self-released the single "Feels Like" to raise money for local charities. Another early release was "Broken". At age 14, Oyekan started busking on the streets of Reading town centre. He uploaded demos to Soundcloud, including "Yes or No", which was shared by HillyDilly and caught the attention of the Arista Records imprint Black Butter.

After signing, Oyekan released his debut single "Cold Feet" in 2020 as well as "Heartbreaker", "Someone New" and "Gone". "Cold Feet" and "Heartbreaker" were "two of the most streamed tracks" on Spotify's Our Generation playlist. His debut EP Runaway was released in 2021. He also released the single "Nervous". Oyekan performed at Reading and Leeds Festivals on the BBC Music Introducing stage and Dot to Dot Festival.

In 2022, Oyekan released the singles "Forwards & Backwards" and "Two Left Feet" featuring Oscar Scheller, collaborated with Rudimental on "Hide and Seek", and featured on Cassia's "Confidence". This was followed by a collaboration with Pixey on "Daisy Chain" in 2023. "Daisy Chain" became Pixey's biggest release as of January 2024.

== Artistry ==
Oyekan was first introduced to music through church. He discovered Vance Joy and became "addicted" to his Dream Your Life Away (2014) album. Oyekan's songwriting influences include Jon Bellion and John Deacon of Queen.

== Discography ==
=== EPs ===
- Runaway (2021)

=== Compilations ===
- Demos Vol 1 (2020)

=== Singles ===
- "Cold Feet" (2020)
- "Heartbreaker" (2020)
- "Someone New" (2020)
- "Gone" (2020)
- "Nervous" (2021)
- "Two Left Feet" (2022) featuring Oscar Scheller
- "Forwards & Backwards" (2022)
- "Hide and Seek" (2022) with Rudimental
- "Daisy Chain" (2023) with Pixey
- "Moved Away" (2025) with George Moir
- "light exposures" (2025) with Manta

=== As featured artist ===
- "Confidence" (2022) by Cassia
