= Dan Spence =

English footballer (born 1989)

Personal information
- Date of birth: 22 October 1989 (age 37)
- Place of birth: England
- Position: Defender

Youth career
- 2009–2010: Glenn Hoddle Academy

Senior career*
Years	Team	Apps	(Gls)
–2009	Reading		
2009	→ Woking (loan)		(1)
2009	Salisbury City	9	(0)
2010	Jerez Industrial CF	13	(0)
2011	Mansfield Town	6	(0)
2011–2013	Hayes & Yeading United	40	(0)
2013–2015	Eastleigh	77	(0)
2015–2018	Sutton United	64	(1)
2018	Hemel Hempstead Town	8	(0)
2018–2019	Woking	9	(0)
2019	Kingstonian		
- * Club domestic league appearances and goals

Daniel Spence (born 22 October 1989) is an English former footballer who played as a defender.

== Early life ==
As a youth player, Spence joined the youth academy of English side Reading FC. He attended Little Heath School in England.

== Career ==
In 2013, Spence signed for English side Eastleigh FC. He helped the club win the league.

== Style of play ==
Spence mainly operated as a defender. He was known for his versatility.

== Personal life ==
Spence was born in 1989 in England. He has worked as a teaching assistant.
