= Arthur Newbery Park =

Public park in Tilehurst, Berkshire, England

- The park in autumn

- Location within Reading, Berkshire
- Interactive map of Arthur Newbery Park
- Type: Public park
- Location: Tilehurst, Reading, UK
- Coordinates: 51°28′N 1°02′W
- Created: 1932; 94 years ago

Arthur Newbery Park is a park in Tilehurst, Reading, Berkshire. It is named after Arthur Newbery, who donated the land in 1932. It is one of Reading's oldest parks and was once part of Kentwood Common. Hollows in the park are remains of chalk and clay pits.

The park slopes down to the north giving views to the River Thames and across its valley. It is mainly grass, with scattered trees, although there are small wooded areas and a play area. What is now the play area was once a pool, the pool become less popular, then neglected c. 1994.

The park is of 26 acres and was once owned by Arthur Newbery, who owned and ran a high class furniture shop located at the junction of Friar Street and Queen Victoria Street in Reading town centre in trade for over forty years. On 14 September 1932, Newbery gifted the park to the mayor of Reading as an open space for the people of Reading. The great and the good were gathered on the late summer afternoon, this being a Wednesday, as it was convenient for the half day closing thus allowing members of the Council who were shopkeepers and the like to attend. Following a small lunch held at Tilehurst Congregational Church at Polsted Road the party, numbering about thirty local dignitaries, walked through the park to the hill overlooking the Thames. Here Newbery made a short speech. Newbery cited the encroaching housing development in the area as his reason for the bequest. A photograph of the occasion appeared in the Reading Chronicle on 17 September, a copy of which is held at Reading Library. The Park was originally known as Hare Moor.

The park had two public air raid shelters during World War II but these have since been filled in. Rabbits can still be seen on the odd occasion running wild in the avenue of trees at the bottom bordering Oak Tree Road where Lucas Farm once stood.

== See also ==
- List of parks and open spaces in Reading, Berkshire
