= Little Heath School =

Coordinates: 51°27′15″N 1°03′31″W

Location
- Little Heath Road; Tilehurst, Berkshire, RG31 5TY; England

Information
- Type: Comprehensive voluntary aided school
- Established: 1963
- Local authority: West Berkshire
- Department for Education URN: 110063 Tables
- Ofsted: Reports
- Head teacher: David Ramsden
- Gender: Coeducational
- Age: 11 to 18
- Enrolment: 1,647
- Houses: Warwick, Stirling, Conway, Arundel
- Colours: Yellow, Red, Blue, Green
- Website: http://www.littleheath.org.uk

Little Heath School is a voluntary-aided co-educational comprehensive secondary school. The school is located in the Little Heath area of the Reading suburb of Tilehurst, in the English county of Berkshire.

Because of its location outside the Reading borough boundary, but in Reading, the school is managed by the West Berkshire Local Education Authority though it serves a catchment area that covers both sides of the borough boundary.

The school's pupil capacity is approximately 1,700 students with approximately 270 people a year in years 7-11. In February 2018, the school received a 'Good' rating from an Ofsted formal Inspection.

The current sixth form center, which was purpose-built in 2015, was opened by Reading West MP Alok Sharma. Part of the campus was rebuilt from 2019-2021, including drama and technology spaces, a gym, and a new canteen. The campus was open for use in April 2021.

Little Heath has a house system, installed in 2014. The four houses are named after castles in the United Kingdom: Stirling (Red), Arundel (Green), Conway (Blue), and Warwick (Yellow).

Little Heath also has annual sports days where each house competes against the other.

== Notable people ==
- Dan Spence (born 1989), footballer
- Tayo Sound (born 2002), singer-songwriter
