= Denefield School =

Coordinates: 51°28′18″N 1°3′22″W

Location
- Long Lane; Tilehurst; Reading, Berkshire, RG31 6XY; England

Information
- Type: Academy
- Motto: Success for life
- Established: 1976
- Local authority: West Berkshire
- Department for Education URN: 137777 Tables
- Ofsted: Reports
- Chair: Lorraine Doyle
- Head teacher: Edwin Towill
- Age: 11 to 18
- Enrolment: 1142
- Website: http://www.denefield.org.uk

Denefield School is a coeducational secondary school and sixth form located in Tilehurst (near Reading) in Berkshire, England.

== History ==
The school was founded in 1976 and was originally called Long Lane Comprehensive School after its location. This name was later changed to avoid confusion with a primary school of the same name on the same road.

When founded, the school had an enrolment of 180 students in Year 7 which was greatly increased the following year when all the students from Cintra Secondary Modern School joined after that school closed.

The Sixth form took its first students in 1981. Over the years Denefield has continued to grow and by 1992 when it became a grant-maintained school it had over 1,000 students on roll. It was awarded a specialism as a Technology College in 1994.

In 1999, Denefield became a foundation school and in January 2012, Denefield became an academy.

== Ofsted ratings ==
The school was rated "good with outstanding features in 2005" and "satisfactory" in 2010.

In 2012 it was rated "inadequate".

In 2014 it was inspected again and rated "good".

It was rated "good" following a short inspection in January 2018 and again in November 2023.

== Building ==
The original school building was erected in 1976 as temporary accommodation, however, the old building still stands and much of the school has been rebuilt and refurbished. The school has facilities for Science, Technology, Art and Music and has large grounds which are used for sporting activities. The school was graded 'good' in its last Ofsted inspection in November 2023.

== Headteachers ==
	Name	Dates in post
6th	Mr Edwin Towill	Sept 2019 to date
5th	Mrs Lucy Hillyard (formerly Miss Lucy Dawe)	Sept 2015 to Aug 2019
4th	Mr Glyn Whiteford	Sept 2008 to Aug 2015
3rd	Mr Eric Joint	Sept 2000 to Aug 2008
2nd	Mr Mike Scott	May 1984 to Aug 2000
1st	Mr Derek Hopkins	Sept 1976 to Apr 1984
