= Purley on Thames =

Coordinates: 51°28′48″N 1°02′46″W

- Village and civil parish
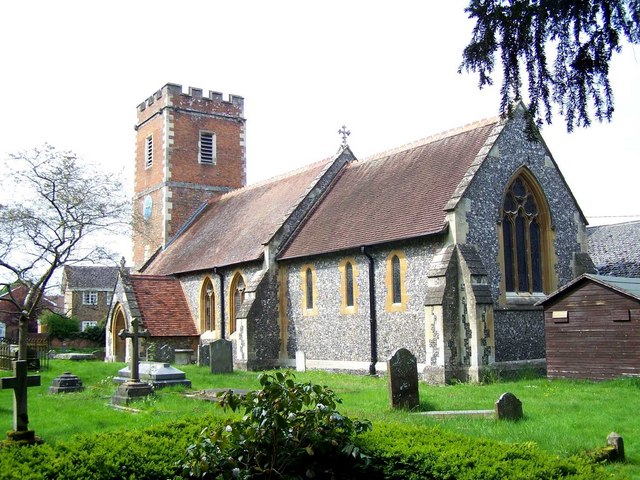
- St. Mary's Church of England Parish Church, Purley-on-Thames

- Location within Berkshire
- Area: 4.27 km^{2} (1.65 sq mi)
- Population: 4,394 (2011 census)
  - Density: 1,029/km^{2} (2,670/sq mi)
- OS grid reference: SU6676
- Civil parish: Purley on Thames
- Unitary authority: West Berkshire
- Ceremonial county: Berkshire
- Region: South East
- Country: England
- Sovereign state: United Kingdom
- Post town: Reading
- Postcode district: RG8, RG31
- Police: Thames Valley
- Fire: Royal Berkshire
- Ambulance: South Central
- UK Parliament: Reading West and Mid Berkshire

Purley on Thames, known locally as simply Purley, is a village and civil parish in Berkshire, England. Purley is centred 3 miles (4.8 km) north-west of Reading, 1 mile (1.6 km) east of Pangbourne, and 22 miles (35 km) south-east of Oxford. Historically, Purley comprised three separate manors and associated settlements. In the centre there is an historic area named variously Lething or Burley (Domesday) which accommodated traders and craftsmen alongside the main Reading to Oxford road.

== History ==
Purley has been settled since at least Saxon times. The original settlements were based on Purley Magna (to the east), Purley Parva (to the north-west) and Purley La Hyde (to the west). Ownership of these manors changed several times over successive centuries but the parish remained almost entirely agricultural until development began in the 20th century, with a population of 150–200. Since then it has grown to 4,232 (2001 census) and around 4,394 people in 2011.

A timbered Elizabethan manor house was constructed in the 1540s, to be replaced by a brick house in 1740. This was demolished around 1800 to be replaced by Purley Park, designed by James Wyatt in 1800 and on the brow of the hill to be well away from flooding. The house is a Grade II* listed building. At the same time most of the eastern part of the parish was emparked; a new road, New Hill, constructed to provide access to the residual village, and the turnpike highway diverted to the south.

In 1948, the mansion was purchased to provide a home and school for people with Down syndrome. While the mansion itself has now been converted to apartments, the Purley Park Trust continues to support adults with learning difficulties with care homes in the former grounds. When the mansion was built, the farm was moved further west and was home to the South Berks Hunt for many years. Its Master of Foxhounds, Cecil Aldin, ran a remount depot there in World War I, employing his friend and fellow artist, Alfred Munnings as a horse doctor. After World War II the property was sold to Messrs G Percy Trentham who used it as the head offices for their civil engineering business. This building is also Grade II* listed. In the 1990s this too was redeveloped and the barn, another listed building, which had originally been adjacent to the church, donated to the parish council as a community facility.

Purley Hall was built around 1608 to replace the manor house of Purley La Hyde and was home to personages such as Warren Hastings, Lady Baden-Powell, as a child, and Thomas Hawes, of South Sea Bubble fame.

Several smallholdings were established between World War I and World War II, including one by Mortimer Menpes, the artist and friend of Whistler. These have almost all now been redeveloped.

=== Recent development ===
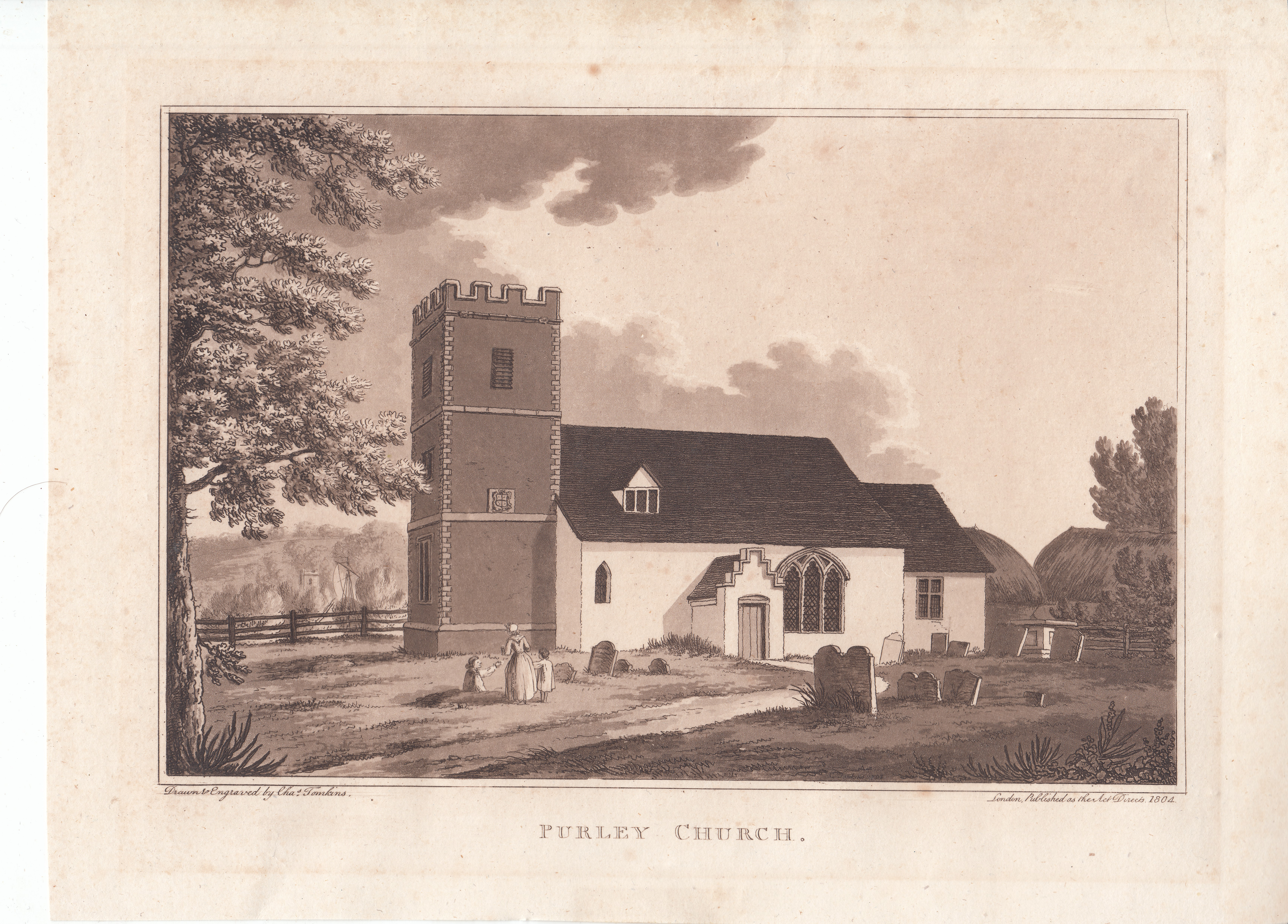
Purley Church by Christopher Tomkins, 1804

Purley lost most of its old houses due to enclosures around 1800 and redevelopment in the 20th century. After the sale of the estate of Purley Magna in the 1920s most of the eastern part of the parish has been developed but there is easy access to rural areas to the west and south. The area encompassing the other manors has also retained a rural character.

Changes in the 20th century began with ribbon development along the Oxford Road and Long Lane and in recent years these properties have been redeveloped with modern housing estates. The Purley River Estate was sold off in small plots in the 1930s and for many years suffered much non-planned development. As a result of the guidance plan agreed during the 1960s, it has gradually developed from self built, timber dwellings and converted railway carriages, to an area with more conventional housing. The gradual upgrading of the area has resulted in a diverse range of housing styles.

== Government ==
The civil parish of Purley on Thames stretches roughly 1.5 km both north–south and east–west and is within the West Berkshire Council unitary authority area. It has its own parish council of 13 elected members with the parish office at Goosecroft, off Beech Road. The parish is within the Reading West and Mid Berkshire parliamentary constituency.

== Geography ==
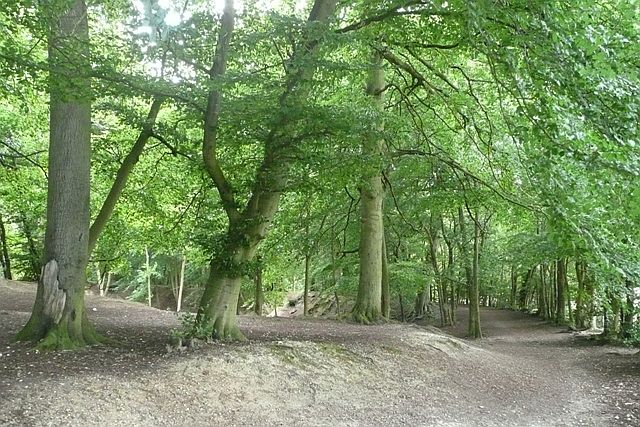
Moss Hall Wood

Previously a rural village, Purley is bounded to the north by a stretch of the River Thames, to the east by the Borough of Reading, to the west by Pangbourne and to the south by Tilehurst and Sulham. The eastern half is almost completely redeveloped but the western half includes meadow land alongside the river and agricultural land on the north slope of the escarpment. There are small settlements in the extreme west, around Sulham Home Farm, and in the north west around Springs and Westbury Farms.

Due to its proximity to the River Thames, Purley has suffered periods of severe flooding, most recently in 2014. The part of Purley closest to the river has changed radically, with most properties having been built since the 1970s and, with a very few exceptions, it was a condition of planning approval that the houses were built at or above the 1947 flood level. A flood alleviation scheme, in the form of a clay bund and a pumping platform was completed by the Environment Agency in late 2014.

== Demography ==
The population has around 88% White British ethnicity, 4% other white ethnicity; residents identifying with an Asian ethnicity constituted 3%, with a Caribbean or African ethnicity 1% and those with a mixed ethnicity, 2%.

2011 Published Statistics: Population, home ownership and extracts from Physical Environment, surveyed in 2005
Output area	Homes owned outright	Owned with a loan	Socially rented	Privately rented	Other	km^{2} roads	km^{2} water	km^{2} domestic gardens	Usual residents	km^{2}
Civil parish	667	768	97	121	15	0.165	0.275	0.706	4,394	4.27

The majority of homes in Purley are detached houses, with minorities of small housing and shared ownership properties and several council estates. The area is largely unaffordable for most of the population – as of 2016, the average price of a property in Purley was £413,268 and the median UK wage is £26,500; the average house price was thus nearly 16 times the average salary.

== Transport ==
The parish is crossed from east to west by both the Great Western Main Line and the A329. The railway is mostly hidden in a deep cutting and the nearest stations are those at Tilehurst and Pangbourne. Purley is served by Reading Buses service 16 and Thames Travel service 143. For those with mobility problems, ReadiBus provides door to door minibus services and the Pangbourne and District Volunteer Centre provides help getting to medical facilities. Mapledurham Lock, on the Thames, is within the parish, despite its name.

== Education ==
Purley has two primary schools with three other primary schools and Denefield Academy within a short distance of its boundaries.

== Amenities ==
Purley is bounded to south and west by the North Wessex Downs area of outstanding natural beauty and has a good range of habitats from river and woodland supporting a diverse range of creatures. The area is crossed by the Thames Path and has 12 designated footpaths. There are two recreation areas, a bowling green and Pike Shaw woods in the ownership of the parish council. There are three community halls: The Barn, the Memorial Hall and St Mary's Church hall, which host a large number of clubs and societies.

== Church ==
The parish church of St Mary was described as 'ancient' in a founding charter of Reading Abbey in 1121. It is believed it was burnt down in 1135 in The Anarchy and replaced by a Norman church around 1150. The new church was built on an excavated platform and graves dating from the 10th century or 11th century were discovered in 1982 only about a foot below the surface. This church was modified and added to in the 14th and 17th centuries and completely rebuilt in 1870 in the Gothic revivalist style by G E Street. A further major extension was added in 1983. The church is a Grade II* listed building.

=== Notable parish priests ===
The list of rectors dates from the mid-14th century. Purley's foremost clergymen suffered ejection during the 120 years of sectarian conflict commencing with Edward VI's reign. These included Richard Gatskyll, in Edward VI's reign, for being a Catholic, John Leke, in Mary I's reign, for having been married, Thomas Handcock, in 1563, for not being Protestant enough for the church overseen by Elizabeth I and Daniel Reynor, in 1662, who was a Congregationalist, and so unwilling to conform to the Act of Uniformity 1662 passed after the Restoration of Charles II. The current Church of England rector is David Archer.
