= Prospect Park, Reading =

Park in Reading, Berkshire, England

Prospect Park
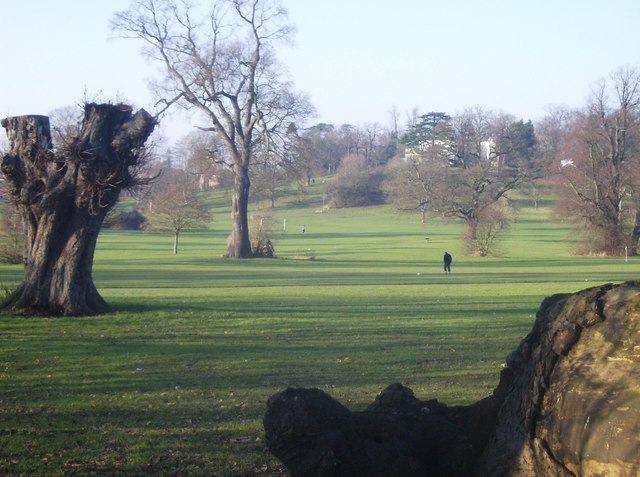
- View across the park to the Mansion House on the hill

- Location within Reading, Berkshire
- Type: Public park
- Location: Reading, Berkshire, UK
- Coordinates: 51°26′52″N 1°00′33″W
- Area: 50 hectares (120 acres)

Prospect Park is a public park in the western suburbs of Reading situated north of the Bath Road in the English county of Berkshire. It is the largest park in Reading, and includes a large regency style house, now known as Prospect Park Mansion House and previously as Prospect House. There are also sporting facilities and the Prospect Park Miniature Railway within the 50 hectares (120 acres) of parkland, and a restaurant in the Mansion House.

The park is listed as Grade II in the English Heritage Register of Historic Parks and Gardens whilst the Mansion House is a Grade II listed building.

== History ==
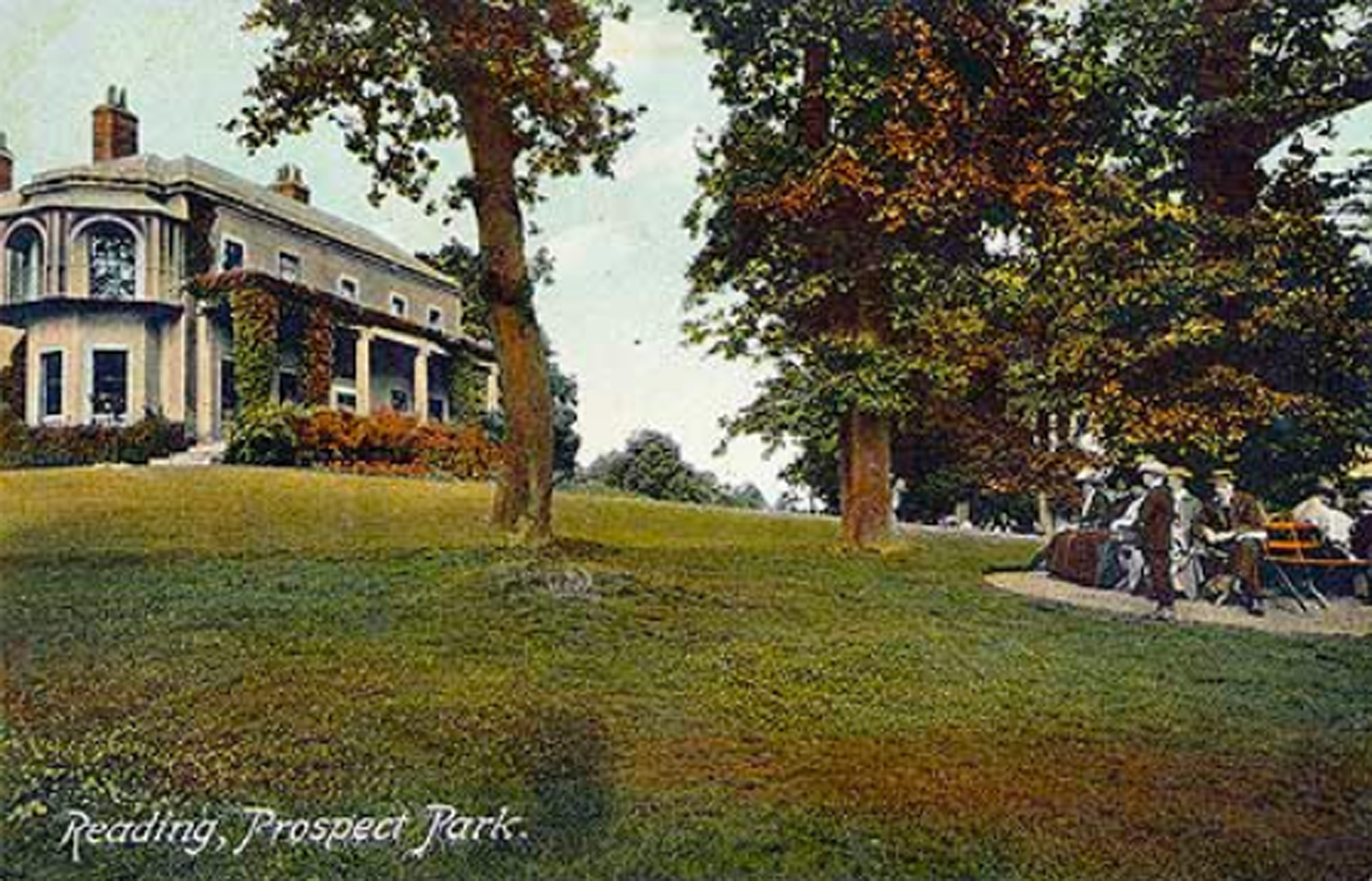
Prospect Mansion in 1910

=== Origins ===
Originally the site of Dirle's Farm, the land was part of the Calcot Park estate. By the middle of the 18th century, Calcot Park was the home of Frances Kendrick and her husband Benjamin Child, but after Frances's death Benjamin sold the bulk of the estate to John Blagrave, keeping only the eastern part that is now Prospect Park. In the 1760s, Benjamin turned the farmhouse of Dirle's Farm into a mansion. He named the park after its views over Reading; it was formerly known as Prospecthill Park.

=== The Liebenrood family ===
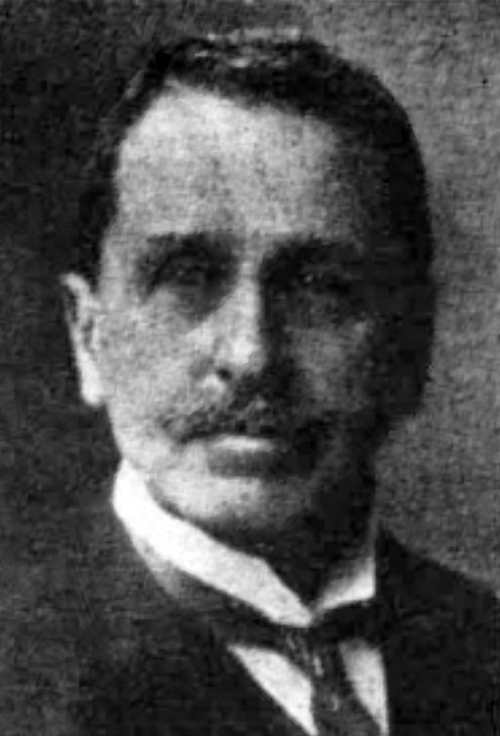
George Engelberts Liebenrood who sold the house to Reading Borough Council

The present regency style house, known as The Mansion House (and originally named Prospect House), was built by John Liebenrood in the late 18th century. John Engelberts Liebenrood (1754-1821) was born in Germany in 1754. His birth name was John Engelberts Ziegenbein and he immigrated to England and obtained naturalisation in 1781. He lived with his great uncle John George Liebenrood, a very wealthy merchant in Purley. When his uncle died in 1795 he inherited his fortune and in accordance with the will changed his name to Liebenrood. In the following year he married Lucy Hancock whose brother was Rear Admiral John Hancock.

Soon after his marriage John commissioned James Wright Sanderson, a pupil of James Wyatt to substantially remodel and enlarge a smaller existing building. The newspapers show that he and his wife Lucy were living in their new home by 1797. John became High Sheriff of Berkshire in 1806. Lucy was known to be a benefactor of the poor. He died in 1821 and Lucy continued to live at Prospect House until her death in 1829. They are both buried in St Mary's Church Purley.

Their son George and daughter Lucy inherited the property but they did not live there. Instead it was rented for many years to William Stephens (1783-1856) who at one time was the Mayor of Reading. He died in 1856 and it was then rented by William Banbury (1813-1893) who was a banker in the firm Fuller Banbury and Co of London. He was also an art collector and when he moved from Prospect Park in 1880 a sale of some of his paintings was held by Christie's at the House.

George and Lucy Liebenrood did not have any children, so when they died Prospect Park was inherited by their cousin Captain John Hancock. He changed his name to Liebenrood in 1865 as a condition of the inheritance. John was born in 1813 near Dover. His father was Rear Admiral John Hancock. In 1847 he married Eliza Cambridge (1818–1888) the daughter of Lemuel Cambridge, a shipowner of Canada. He entered the navy in 1827 and spent 35 years in the naval service, rising to the rank of captain. He died in 1883 and his wife Elizabeth died in 1888. Both are buried in the Church of St Michael, Tilehurst.

Their son Major George Engelberts Liebenrood (1847–1928) inherited the house after Elizabeth's death. George was born in 1847 on Prince Edward Island, Canada. At the age of 18 he went to the Royal Military College, Sandhurst. He had a distinguished military career and rose to the rank of Major. In 1881 he married Winifred Markham (1858–1930), the daughter of Arthur Bayley Markham of Glendon. The couple lived at Prospect Park for about fourteen years, and then in 1902 they sold it to the Reading Borough Council.

=== Murder of Mary-Ann Leneghan ===
On the early morning of 7 May 2005, 16-year-old Mary-Ann Leneghan was stabbed to death in Prospect Park. In 2006, six men were convicted of her murder and sentenced to life imprisonment, with minimum terms ranging from 23 to 27 years.

=== Macaws (Parrots) ===
Missy the free-flying macaw one of the beloved parrots known as Reading's best pet' and a resident of Tilehurst, was tragically shot and killed with an air rifle on Tuesday, September 20, 2022. She was one of two Blue and Gold Macaws that frequently soared over Prospect Park and throughout Reading, alongside her companion, Cairo. The two birds, who have been inseparable for over five years, grew up together with just a four-month age difference.

== Facilities ==
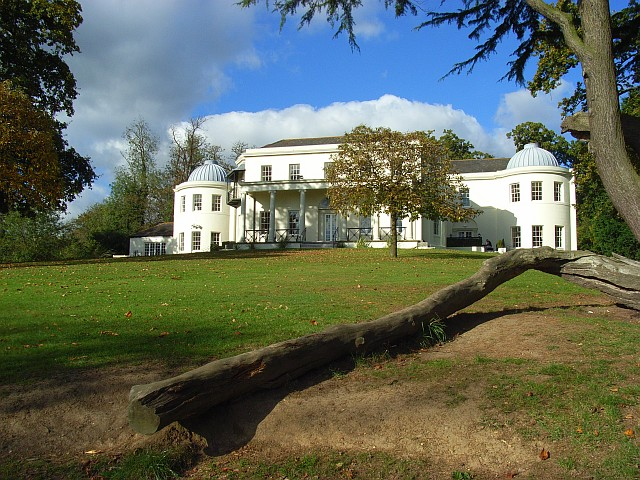
The Mansion House and surrounding parkland

=== Restaurant ===
After a long period of dereliction, the Mansion House in the centre of the park has been restored and now houses a Harvester restaurant.

=== Parkland ===
The area surrounding the Mansion House has broad sweeps of short cut grass, with areas of meadow grassland. A pond lies to the south of the house and attracts an assortment of wildlife, while 'The Rookery' can be found to the north - a mature oak woodland and Wildlife Heritage Site. In the south-eastern corner of the park, the Reading Society of Model Engineers runs a miniature railway, which is open to the public on certain days.

=== Sports ===
The park has facilities for a number of sports, including rugby, tennis, bowls, basketball, and table tennis. It also hosts a weekly parkrun, held over a distance of 5 kilometres (3.1 mi) every Saturday at 9:00 am.

The first race in the Hampshire League Cross Country series in 2013 was held in the park. Other races in the park have included The Color Run and Cancer Research UK's Race for Life.

== See also ==
- List of parks and open spaces in Reading, Berkshire
