= Church of St Michael, Tilehurst =

Church in Berkshire, England

Coordinates: 51.45189°N 1.03152°W

Church of Saint Michael, Tilehurst
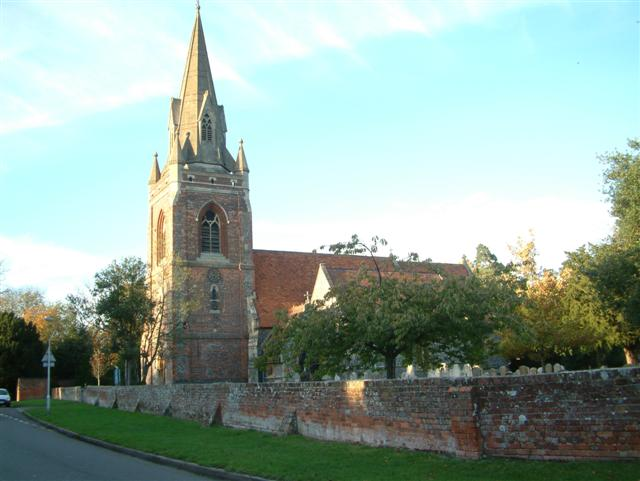
- Church of Saint Michael, Tilehurst
- Location: New Lane Hill, Tilehurst, Reading, Berkshire RG30 4JX
- Country: England
- Denomination: Church of England
- Website: https://www.stmichaeltilehurst.org.uk/

History
- Founded: 12th century

Administration
- Diocese: Oxford
- Parish: Tilehurst

Clergy
- Rector: Revd Dr Liz Ratcliffe

St. Michael's Church, Tilehurst, is the parish church of Tilehurst in the English county of Berkshire. It is a parish of the Church of England in the Diocese of Oxford.

The church dates from the 12th century, although the oldest part of the current building is the south aisle, built round about 1300, now dedicated as the Lady Chapel. In the early 17th century, this aisle gained the addition of one of the most spectacular renaissance church monuments in the county. Dutch merchant and lord of the manor, Sir Peter Vanlore, lies with wife in heraldic splendour, accompanied by nine children.

The building was judged to need repair work by the 19th century, and was much restored in 1855 to designs by G. E. Street. This work included building the north aisle and adding a spire to the tower, which dates from the 1730s. The church was again altered in 1955, and an extension was completed in 1993, adding various rooms and the other facilities that are needed by a busy parish church.
