= Reading West and Mid Berkshire =

UK Parliament constituency (since 2024)

Coordinates: 51.45°N 1.14°W

- County constituency for the House of Commons
- Boundaries since 2024
- Boundary of Reading West and Mid Berkshire in South East England
- County: Berkshire
- Electorate: 69,999 (2023)
- Major settlements: Reading (part), Purley-on-Thames, Theale, Mortimer, Pangbourne

Current constituency
- Created: 2024
- Member of Parliament: Olivia Bailey (Labour)
- Seats: One
- Created from: Reading West; Newbury; Wokingham

Reading West and Mid Berkshire is a constituency (Note: A county constituency (for the purposes of election expenses and type of returning officer)) in the House of Commons of the UK Parliament. It was formed as a result of the 2023 Periodic Review of Westminster constituencies and primarily replaced the former Reading West constituency, also subsuming parts of the Newbury and Wokingham constituencies. It was first contested at the 2024 general election. Since 2024 it has been represented by Olivia Bailey of the Labour Party.

Some 30% of the constituency's voters live in the Borough of Reading, with the remainder living in the West Berkshire local government area.

== Constituency profile ==
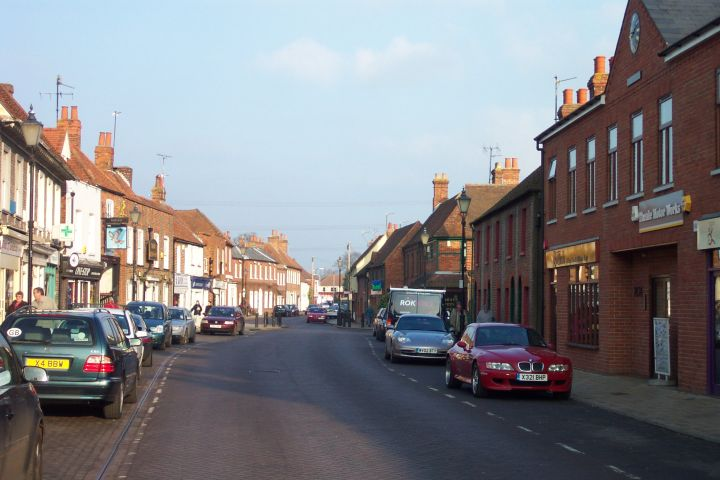
High Street, Theale

Reading West and Mid Berkshire is a constituency in Berkshire in South East England. It covers the western suburbs of the town of Reading (Norcot, Tilehurst, Purley on Thames and Calcot) and parts of the rural West Berkshire district, including the villages of Theale, Burghfield, Stratfield Mortimer and Pangbourne.

Reading is one of the UK's largest towns without city status. It is sometimes considered part of the London commuter belt; the capital is located around 37 miles (60 km) to the east. Reading is a historic town and was traditionally a centre for brewing and manufacturing. Today the economy is geared towards the technology and insurance industries. Most of the Reading suburbs within this constituency are affluent and were largely developed in the mid 20th century with mostly detached and semi-detached housing. House prices across the constituency are generally higher than the regional and UK averages.

The constituency's rural area forms part of the North Wessex Downs, a National Landscape of chalk hills. This area is also wealthy and contains many small villages. AWE Nuclear Security Technologies, the Ministry of Defence body responsible for the research and manufacturing of the UK's nuclear weapons, has two major facilities in this constituency close to the villages of Burghfield and Stratfield Mortimer and is thus a significant local employer.

Reading West and Mid Berkshire has a below-average proportion of young adults. Residents have high levels of income and homeownership and the child poverty rate is low. They have average levels of education and a high proportion work in the manufacturing sector. The percentage of residents claiming unemployment benefits is below-average. White people made up 86% of the population at the 2021 census.

At the local council level, the Reading suburbs closer to the town centre are represented by Labour Party councillors whilst the outer suburbs and rural villages elected Conservatives and Liberal Democrats. An estimated 51% of voters in Reading West and Mid Berkshire supported remaining in the European Union in the 2016 referendum, marginally higher than the UK-wide figure of 48%.

== History ==
At the time of the 2023 Periodic Review of Westminster constituencies, there were eight constituencies in the county of Berkshire. Of these constituencies, only three (Reading East, Reading West, and Windsor) were within the permitted electorate range of no fewer than 69,724 electors and no more than 77,062. All of the remaining constituencies were above the upper limit. The Boundary Commission for England therefore proposed the addition of a ninth constituency within the county.

Whilst both Reading constituencies could have remained unchanged, the boundary commission instead proposed a reconfiguration to account for the increased electorates of the surrounding constituencies, and to better reflect local ties in the surrounding communities. This involved the creation of two new constituencies (Earley and Woodley and Mid Berkshire), both with the bulk of their electorate outside the Borough of Reading but including outer wards of the borough, together with a new Reading Central constituency entirely within the borough.

During the process of acceptance of these proposals, the name was changed from Mid Berkshire to West Reading and Mid Berkshire, despite the relative small proportion of the constituency that is within Reading. The new constituency includes three borough wards and twelve wards from West Berkshire, as opposed to seven and six respectively for the old Reading West constituency.

== Boundaries ==
The constituency is composed of the following wards (as they existed on 1 December 2020):

- The Borough of Reading wards of: Kentwood, Norcot, and Tilehurst; and
- The District of West Berkshire wards of: Aldermaston, Basildon, Bradfield, Bucklebury, Burghfield & Mortimer, Downlands (polling district BC), Pangbourne, Ridgeway, Theale, Tilehurst & Purley, Tilehurst Birch Copse, and Tilehurst South & Holybrook.

The Reading wards, together with Pangbourne, Theale and the three Tilehurst wards in West Berkshire, comprising 67% of the electorate, were previously in the Reading West seat, with the remaining areas coming from Newbury and Wokingham in equal parts.

The seat is bordered by the parliamentary constituencies of Newbury, Didcot and Wantage, Henley and Thame, Reading Central, Earley and Woodley, Wokingham, North East Hampshire, and North West Hampshire.

== Members of Parliament ==
Reading West prior to 2024

Election	Member	Party
2024	Olivia Bailey	Labour

== Elections ==
=== Elections in the 2020s ===
General election 2024: Reading West and Mid Berkshire
Party	Candidate	Votes	%	±%
Labour	Olivia Bailey	16,273	35.0	+12.1
Conservative	Ross Mackinnon	14,912	32.0	–24.8
Reform	Kate Bosley	6,260	13.4	N/A
Liberal Democrats	Helen Belcher	5,103	10.9	–5.9
Green	Carolyne Culver	3,169	6.8	+3.4
Independent	Adrian Abbs	562	1.2	N/A
Independent	Adie Peppiatt	272	0.6	N/A
Majority		1,361	3.0	N/A
Turnout		46,551	67.7	–2.9
Registered electors		68,786		
Labour gain from Conservative		Swing	▲18.5	

2019 notional result
Party	Vote	%
Conservative	28,078	56.8
Labour	11,320	22.9
Liberal Democrats	8,356	16.9
Green	1,690	3.4
Turnout	49,444	70.6
Electorate	69,999	

== See also ==
- List of parliamentary constituencies in Berkshire
- List of parliamentary constituencies in the South East England (region)
