= Sulham =

Coordinates: 51°27′50″N 1°04′30″W

- Village
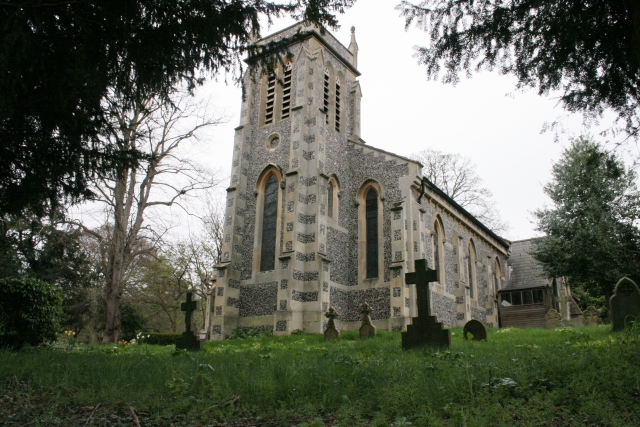
- St Nicholas' church, Sulham

- Location within Berkshire
- OS grid reference: SU6474
- Civil parish: Sulham
- Unitary authority: West Berkshire
- Ceremonial county: Berkshire
- Region: South East
- Country: England
- Sovereign state: United Kingdom
- Post town: Reading
- Postcode district: RG8
- Police: Thames Valley
- Fire: Royal Berkshire
- Ambulance: South Central
- UK Parliament: Reading West and Mid Berkshire

Sulham is a village and civil parish in West Berkshire, England. The larger village of Tidmarsh, with which Sulham shares a grouped parish council, is adjacent to Sulham on the west side, with Tilehurst on the east side.

== Geography ==
From the west, Sulham is surrounded by the civil parishes of Tidmarsh, Pangbourne, Purley-on-Thames and Tilehurst to the east. To the south is Theale which has the local roads' junction with the M4 motorway. Sulham Woods and a lengthwise escarpment rises in this area from 42 to 105 m (138 to 344 ft). Sulham Woods is a Site of Special Scientific Interest and forms one side of the village. Features include many chalk pits and open rolling fields. The village is dominated by the Sulham Hall estate in the north and is spread out along Sulham Lane which stretches between Pangbourne and Theale, parallel to the River Pang.

== Landmarks ==
Sulham House is a Grade II listed country house and was built about 1710. This has been the home of the Wilder family and their descendants since 1712. They have owned or rented estates in the parish since 1497. A feature of the parish and estate is the elevated Wilder's Folly, a tower built in 1768 by Reverend Henry Wilder of Sulham House and later used as a dovecote. The ecclesiastical parish church of St Nicholas, built in 1836, stands next to the house and is Grade II listed. This is the main settled area of the village. Sulham Farmhouse is a Grade II* listed building.

== Governance ==
There are two tiers of local government covering Sulham, at parish and unitary authority level: Tidmarsh with Sulham Parish Council and West Berkshire Council. The parish council is a grouped parish council, also covering the neighbouring parish of Tidmarsh. Parish council meetings are generally held at Tidmarsh Village Hall.
