= River Bourne, Berkshire =

River in Berkshire, England

Coordinates: 51.4570°N 1.1044°W

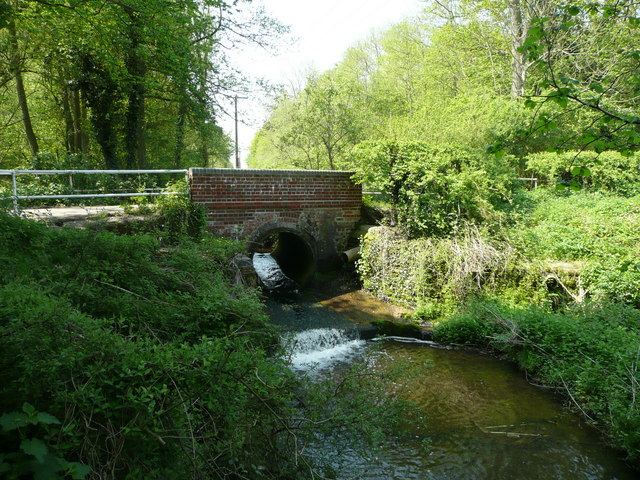
The River Bourne at Admoor Bridge near Bradfield Southend

The River Bourne is a chalk stream in the English county of Berkshire. It is a tributary of the River Pang and, indirectly, of the River Thames. The Bourne's source is near the village of Chapel Row and it joins the River Pang south of the M4 motorway near the village of Tidmarsh.

== See also ==
- List of rivers in England
