= The Downs School, Compton =

Coordinates: 51.5129°N 1.2532°W

The Downs School

Location
- Manor Crescent; Berkshire, RG20 6AD; England

Information
- Type: Comprehensive foundation school
- Motto: 'Learning together, Learning For Life'
- Local authority: West Berkshire
- Department for Education URN: 110102 Tables
- Ofsted: Reports
- Head teacher: Chris Robert Prosser
- Gender: Co-educational
- Age: 11 to 18
- Enrolment: 1200
- Houses: Aldworth, Beechwood, Chiltern, Lowbury, Perborough, Ridgeway, Ilsley.
- Colours: Yellow, Purple, Sky Blue, Ruby Red, Emerald Green, Cobalt Blue, Neon Orange.
- Website: thedownsschool.org.uk

The Downs School is a comprehensive secondary school in the village of Compton, Berkshire, England. It is a state school run by West Berkshire Education Authority.

== Overview ==
Starting at age 11 in Year 7, The Downs has approximately 1150 pupils, which includes 260 students in the sixth-form. The head-teacher is Chris Robert Prosser, previously Deputy Head-teacher before Valerie Holdey's retirement in December 2013. The school is located on Manor Crescent, with the nearest major town being Newbury 8 miles away. Other neighbouring towns include Wantage, Didcot, Thatcham and Reading.

For the past 2 years it has been the highest attaining school in West Berkshire using the measure of 5A*-C GCSEs including higher passes in English and mathematics.It is also the last remaining West Berkshire Authority secondary school to retain its own swimming pool after St Bartholomew's School removed its pool in Summer 2009.

== Specialisms ==
The school specialises in languages. The school has exchange visits to France, Germany and Spain. Sports tours are also annually organised. Teams have been to Spain, the Netherlands, Cyprus and Malta.

The Downs also has specialisms in science and maths.

== Sixth-form ==
The school has a sixth-form centre of about 260 students. Previously located on the bottom floor of the Graham Taylor building (GT), It is located in the newly renovated old science block, after moving there when the new Science building (Hubble) was built. Subjects range from all the sciences to politics, economics, law and media studies. The current head of sixth-form is Mrs Anderson. Its results at A-Level are above average for a non-selective state school.

== Notable former pupils ==
- Theo Walcott
