= Sulham and Tidmarsh Woods and Meadows =

Protected area in Berkshire, England

- Site of Special Scientific Interest
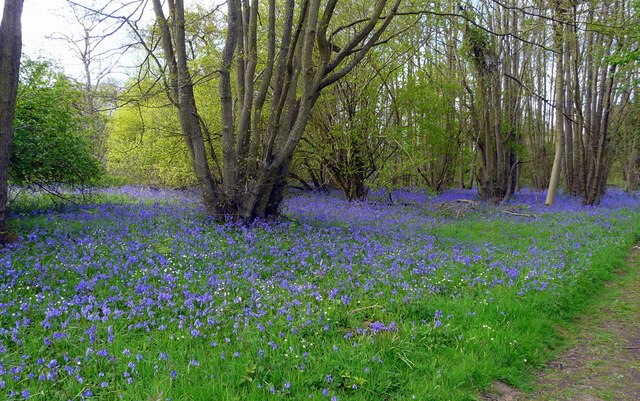

- Location within Berkshire
- Location of Sulham and Tidmarsh Woods and Meadows.
- Area of search: Berkshire
- Grid reference: SU 639 743
- Coordinates: 51.464°N 1.082°W
- Interest: Biological
- Area: 75.7 hectares (187 acres)
- Notification date: 1986
- Location map: Magic Map

Sulham and Tidmarsh Woods and Meadows is a 75.7-hectare (187-acre) biological Site of Special Scientific Interest west of Reading in Berkshire. Previously known as Pang Valley SSSI, the site is mostly sandwiched between the River Pang and the Sulham Road and includes Broom Copse, Herridge's Copse, Hogmoor Copse, Park Wood, Moor Copse and Barton's Copse. Much of the southern part of the site is the Berkshire, Buckinghamshire and Oxfordshire Wildlife Trust's Moor Copse Nature Reserve. The whole site lies within the North Wessex Downs Area of Outstanding Natural Beauty.

The SSSI consists of five areas.

Location	Unit area (Ha)	Main habitat
51.4704°N 1.0828°W	15.24	Acid grassland - lowland
51.4659°N 1.0786°W	15.48	Broadleaved, mixed and yew woodland - lowland
51.4605°N 1.0844°W	27.57	Broadleaved, mixed and yew woodland - lowland
51.4551°N 1.0803°W	7.70	Broadleaved, mixed and yew woodland - lowland
51.4659°N 1.0831°W	9.76	Neutral grassland - lowland

The site is in a broad valley of unusually varied alluvial loams, gravel terraces and peat deposits, resulting from flooding in late glacial times by an enlarged River Kennet. The variety in soils and topography results in a mosaic of damp copses and seasonally flooded meadow communities, maintained here by a long history of coppicing and sympathetic grassland husbandry. The woodland on the site supports a rich invertebrate fauna including over 300 species of moth.
