= Moor Copse =

Nature reserve in Berkshire

Coordinates: 51.4600°N 1.0881°W

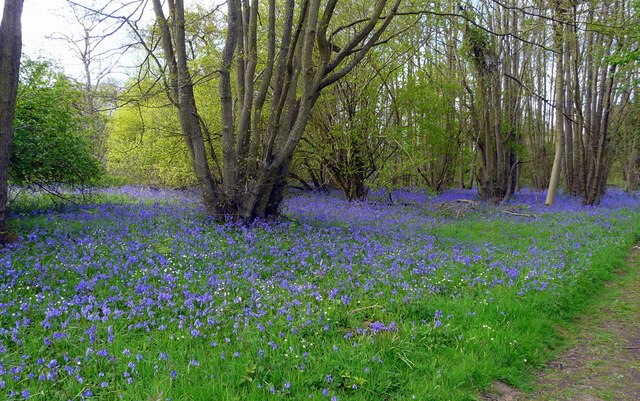
- Interactive map of Moor Copse
- Type: Nature reserve
- Location: Reading, Berkshire
- OS grid: SU634738
- Area: 65 hectares (160 acres)
- Manager: Berkshire, Buckinghamshire and Oxfordshire Wildlife Trust

Moor Copse is a 65-hectare (160-acre) nature reserve west of Reading in Berkshire. It is managed by the Berkshire, Buckinghamshire and Oxfordshire Wildlife Trust. Parts of it are in Sulham and Tidmarsh Woods and Meadows, which is a Site of Special Scientific Interest.

This reserve in the valley of the River Pang has wildflower meadows surrounded by wet woodland. In the autumn the woods have a range of fungi, such as deadman's fingers and green elfcup mushrooms. Mammals include foxes and badgers.
