= Pangbourne =

Village in Berkshire, England

Coordinates: 51°29′02″N 1°05′13″W

- Village and civil parish
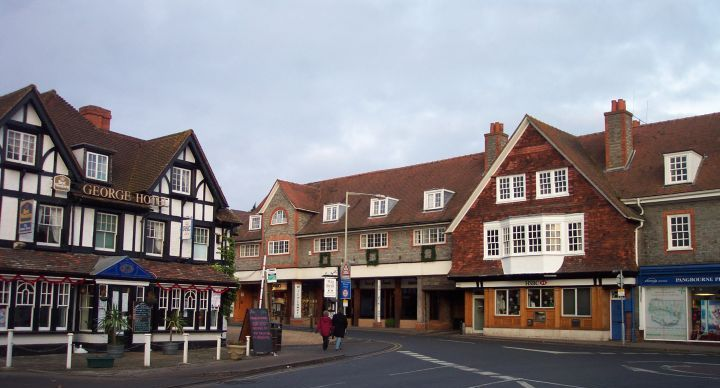
- Pangbourne village centre

- Location within Berkshire
- Area: 6.8 km^{2} (2.6 sq mi)
- Population: 3,277 (2021 census)
  - Density: 482/km^{2} (1,250/sq mi)
- OS grid reference: SU6376
- Civil parish: Pangbourne
- Unitary authority: West Berkshire
- Ceremonial county: Berkshire
- Region: South East
- Country: England
- Sovereign state: United Kingdom
- Post town: Reading
- Postcode district: RG8
- Dialling code: 0118
- Police: Thames Valley
- Fire: Royal Berkshire
- Ambulance: South Central
- UK Parliament: Reading West and Mid Berkshire

Pangbourne is a village and civil parish on the River Thames in the West Berkshire unitary area of the county of Berkshire, England. Pangbourne has shops, churches, schools and a village hall. Outside its grouped developed area is an independent school, Pangbourne College.

== Toponymy ==
Pangbourne's name is recorded from 844 as Old English Pegingaburnan (dative case), which means "the stream of the people of [a man called] Pǣga".

== Geography ==
Pangbourne is situated on the A329 road 6 miles (10 km) west of Reading, the nearest town, and 22 miles (35 km) southeast of Oxford. It is across the river from the Oxfordshire village of Whitchurch-on-Thames.

The two villages are connected by Whitchurch Bridge and by the traversable weir of Whitchurch Lock. The River Pang flows through the centre of Pangbourne village before joining the Thames between Whitchurch Lock and Whitchurch bridge. Most of the developed area is just above the current flood plain of the River Thames which benefits from hay meadows traditionally used as flood meadows to either side of Pangbourne. Fewer than fifteen properties here flooded during the Winter storms of 2013–14 in the United Kingdom.

== History ==
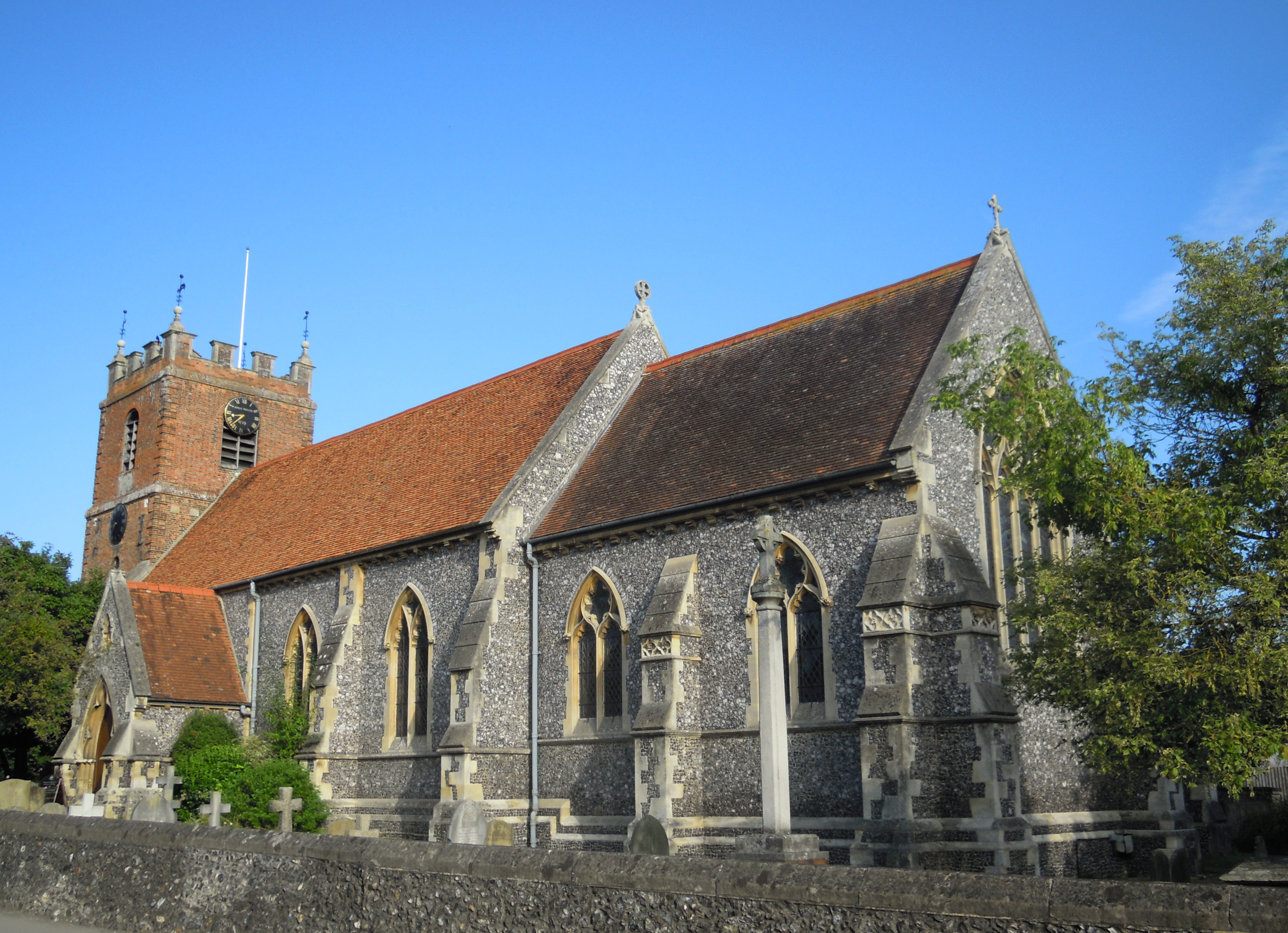
St James the Less parish church

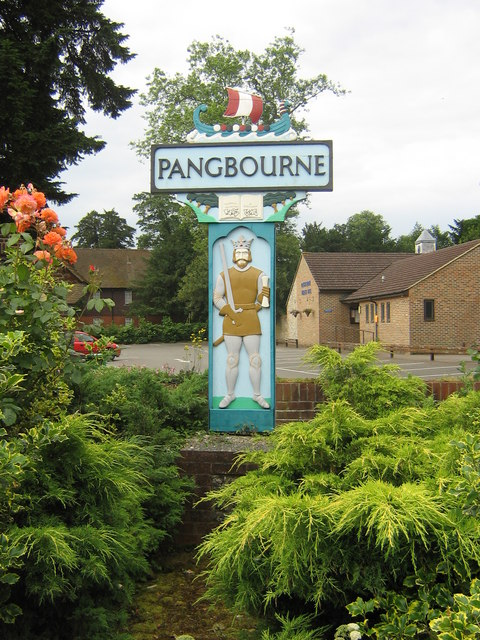
Village name sign by its secular parish hall with homes in background.

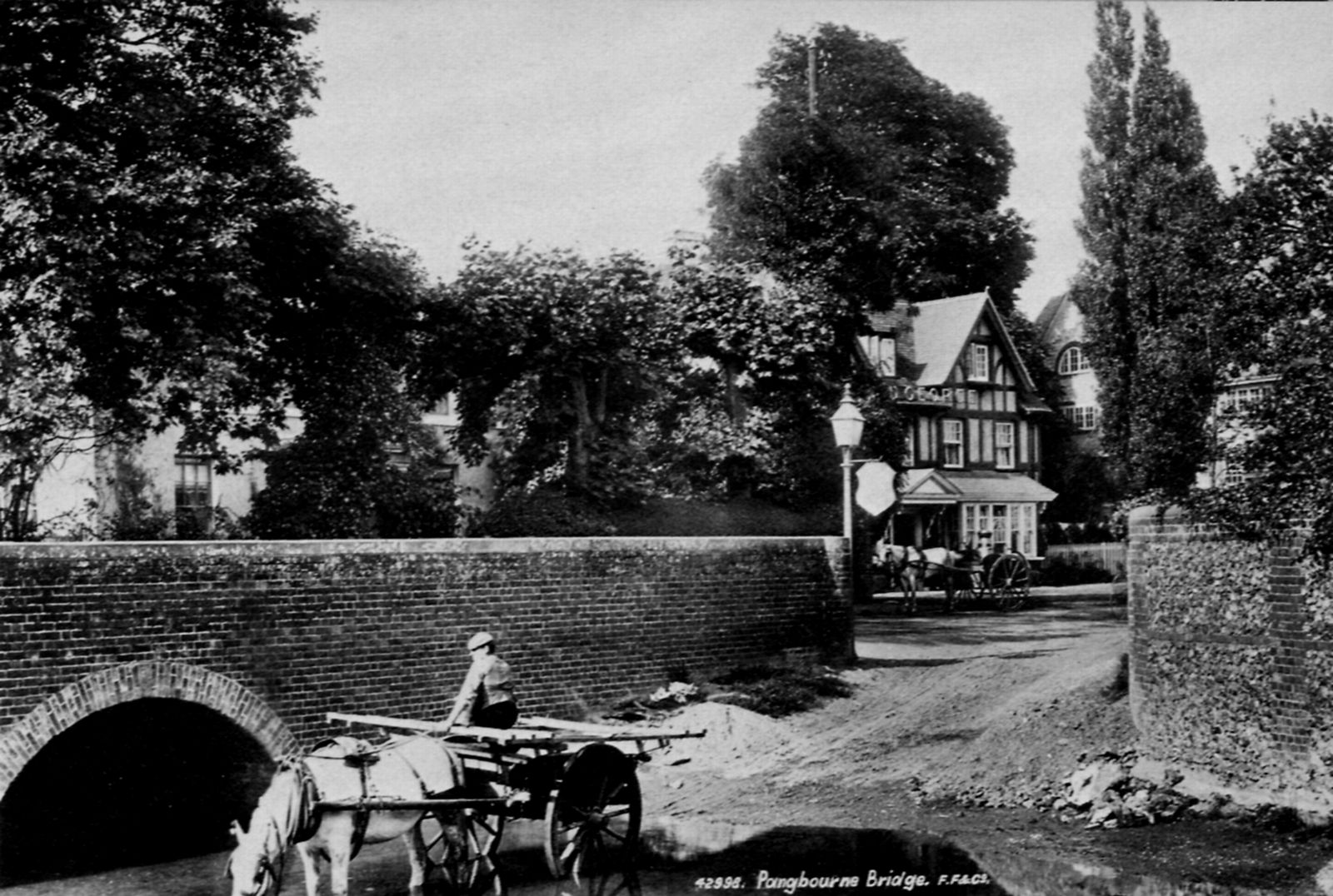
Pangbourne Bridge (period 1850–98) by Francis Frith

In Norman times, the manor was given to Reading Abbey and the manor house – now called Bere Court – became the abbot's summer residence. The last abbot, Hugh Cook Faringdon, was arrested there in 1539 and subsequently executed in Reading. The manor was later purchased by Sir John Davis, the Elizabethan mathematician and the Earl of Essex's fellow-conspirator. His monument is in the Church of England parish church of Saint James the Less.

The Pangbourne war memorial is found in the grounds of the church. It was designed by the artist Vera Waddington. Other monuments and hatchments in the church are mostly to the Breedon family. John Breedon, Senior, bought the manor in 1671. He was High Sheriff of Berkshire and brother of the Governor of Nova Scotia, whose son later succeeded John at the manor. The family produced a number of sheriffs and MPs for Berkshire, as well as doctors and rectors of the parish.

Alwyn Surplice, musician, composer of church music and cathedral organist, was borne in Pangborne in 1906. Initially taught the organ by his mother, the organist of Pangborne Parish Church, he went on to be assistant organist and sub-organist of St George's Chapel, Windsor Castle and, after war service, Organist and Master of the Choristers successively at Bristol Cathedral and Winchester Cathedral. He was a professor at the Royal Academy of Music. He died at Winchester in 1977.

Kenneth Grahame, author of The Wind in the Willows, retired to Church Cottage in Pangbourne. He died there in 1932. E. H. Shepard's famous illustrations of his book are said to have been inspired by the Thameside landscape there and the water voles of the river are thought to have inspired the character of Ratty. The Falkland Islands memorial chapel at Pangbourne College was opened by Queen Elizabeth II in March 2000. It was built to commemorate the lives and sacrifice of all who died during the Falklands War of 1982, and the courage of those who served with them to preserve the sovereignty of the islands. The Queen revisited the Memorial Chapel in 2007 to mark the 25th anniversary of the Falklands war.

Jimmy Page owned a riverside cottage in Pangbourne from 1967 to 1973. The band Led Zeppelin was formed and rehearsals for their first album took place in Pangbourne.

On 12 April 2024, the men's section of the public toilets were officially opened by David Potts, standing in for the planned Joe Lycett.

== Governance ==
Pangbourne is a civil parish with an elected parish council. The parish covers the immediate agricultural green buffer and a part wooded, part cultivated south-western area. The rural area contains no other significant settlements and includes Pangbourne College. The parish shares boundaries with the Berkshire parishes of Purley-on-Thames, Tidmarsh, Sulham, Bradfield and Basildon. Along the River Thames, to the north, there is also a boundary with the Oxfordshire parish of Whitchurch-on-Thames. The parish is in the area of the unitary authority of West Berkshire. The parish council and the unitary authority are responsible for different aspects of local government. Pangbourne forms part of the Reading West and Mid Berkshire parliamentary constituency. The parish is twinned with Houdan in France.

== Transport ==
The village's railway station is located on the Great Western Main Line and has stopping services to Oxford via Didcot Parkway, and to London Paddington via Reading.

== Recreational Groups ==
=== Pangbourne and District Silver Band ===
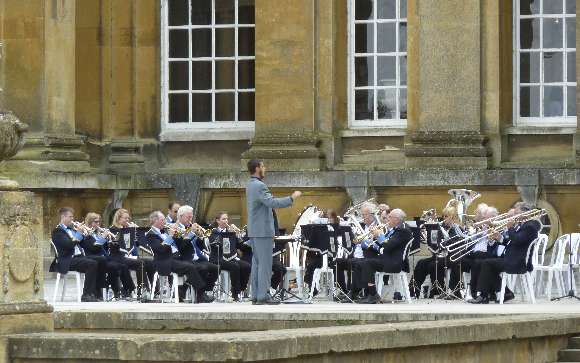
The Pangbourne and District Silver Band July 2010

The history of the Pangbourne Band began in 1893 when a fife and drum band used to rehearse in a shed behind the water mill, but when the First World War broke out the band broke up, reforming in 1919 after the Armistice. Regular concerts were held from then until the outbreak of the Second World War, when many of the bandsmen served in the Armed Forces and the band again broke up and the instruments were held in storage.

In 1962, Henry Fuller, a local tutor, started the village brass group. Local musicians became involved when the old instruments were recovered from storage, and the band was established as a full-size contesting brass band within a few years. In 2009, Pangbourne All-Comers' Band was begun, incorporating brass and, for parade days, drums and bell lyre glockenspiel.

=== Pangbourne Twinning Association ===
Pangbourne has been twinned with the French Village of Houdan, in Brittany, for over 30 years. Every year the Pangbourne twinning association holds fundraising events such as a sales stand at the Pangbourne Fete where they speak French to those who are interested in practising the language.

=== Pangbourne Tennis Club ===
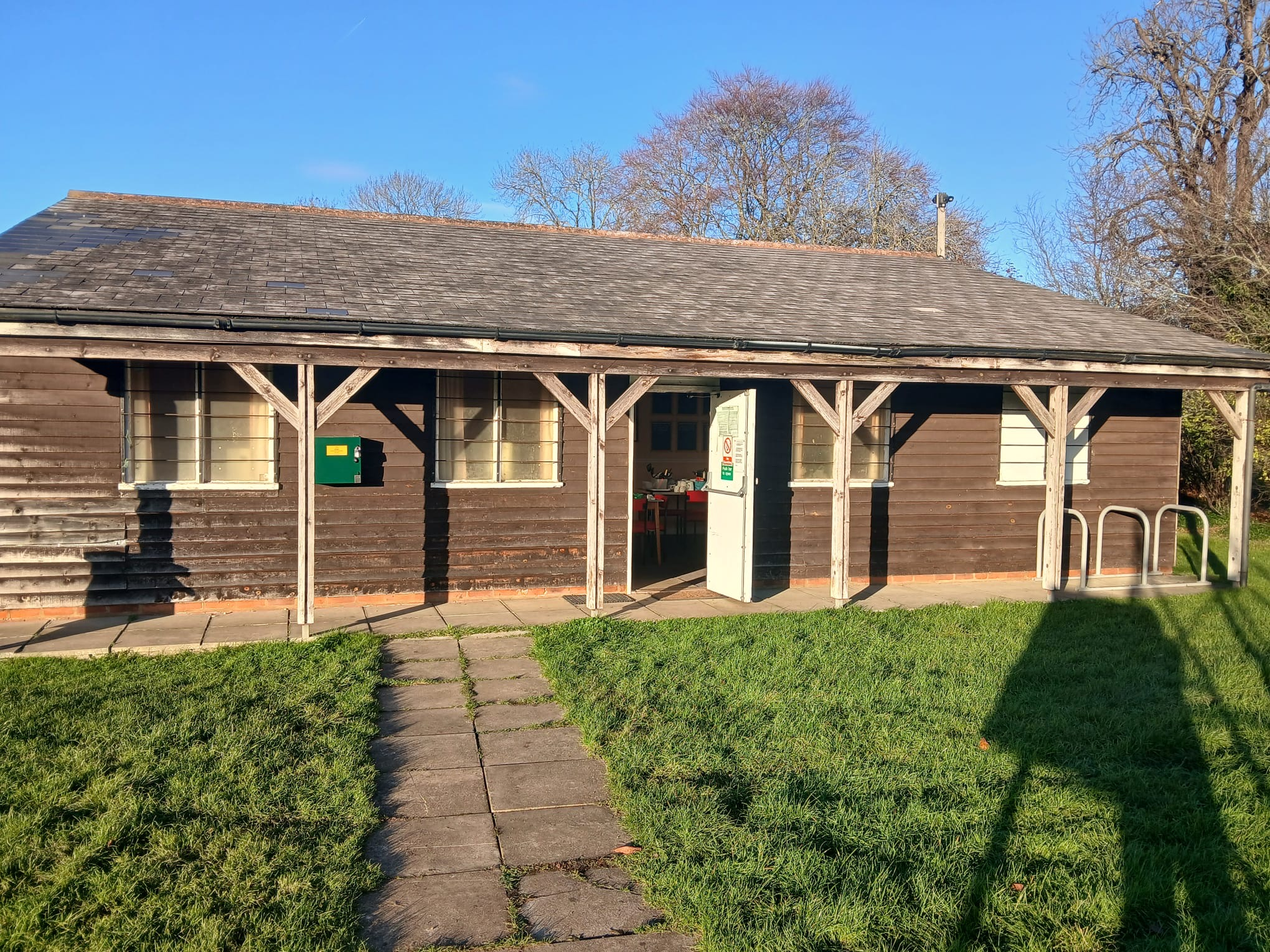
Pangbourne Tennis and Bowls Club House 2025

Pangbourne Tennis club consists of three tennis courts and a club house and has close links to the bowls club next door. In 2024, the club won the LTA award for National Club of the Year.

=== 1st Purley and Pangbourne (Scouts) ===
Pangbourne is linked to the neighbouring village of Purley and together have multiple sections in both villages for children between the ages of 4 and 18 including Squirrels, Beavers, Cubs, Scouts and Explorers.

=== Pangbourne Rotary Club ===
The Pangbourne Rotary Club, a charitable organization whose aim is to help the community, was formed in 1989 and meets once a week at the Bull.

== Demography and land use ==
2011 Published Statistics: Population, home ownership and extracts from Physical Environment, surveyed in 2005
Output area	Homes owned outright	Owned with a loan	Socially rented	Privately rented	Other	km^{2} roads	km^{2} water	km^{2} domestic gardens	Usual residents	km^{2}
Civil parish	478	418	101	187	41	0.237	0.012	0.654	2978	6.8
