= Wilder's Folly =

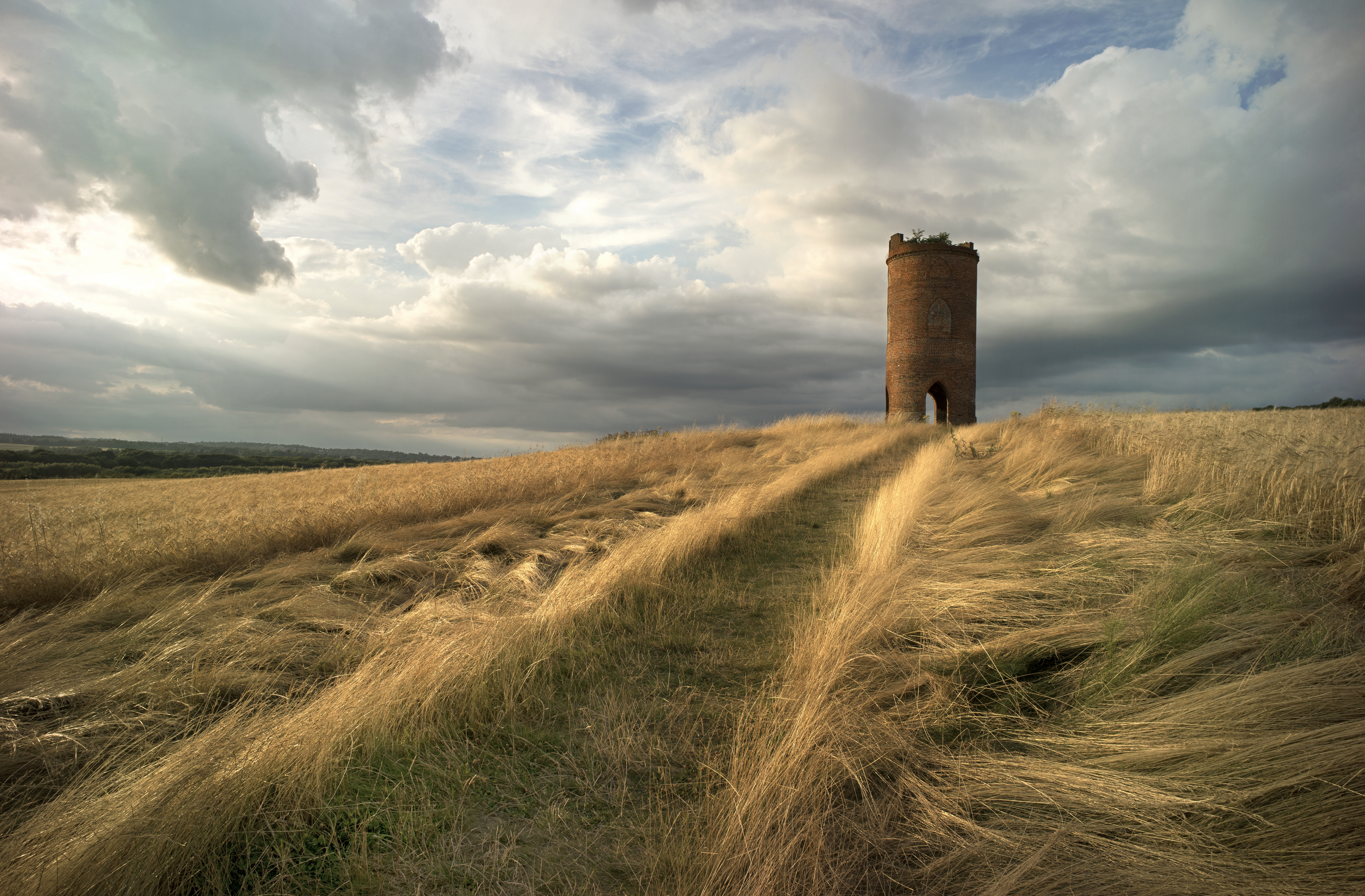
- Wilder's Folly on Nunhide Hill
- Interactive map of the Wilder's Folly area
- Alternative names: Pincent's Kiln, Nunhide Tower and Flint's Folly

General information
- Type: Folly, belvedere, dovecote
- Architectural style: Eclectic, neoclassical
- Location: Sulham, Berkshire, UK, United Kingdom
- Coordinates: 51.44819°N 1.06725°W
- Completed: 1769
- Client: Henry Wilder

Wilder's Folly (also known as Pincent's Kiln, Nunhide Tower and Flint's Folly) is a folly and dovecote at Nunhide, near the village of Sulham in the English county of Berkshire.

== History ==
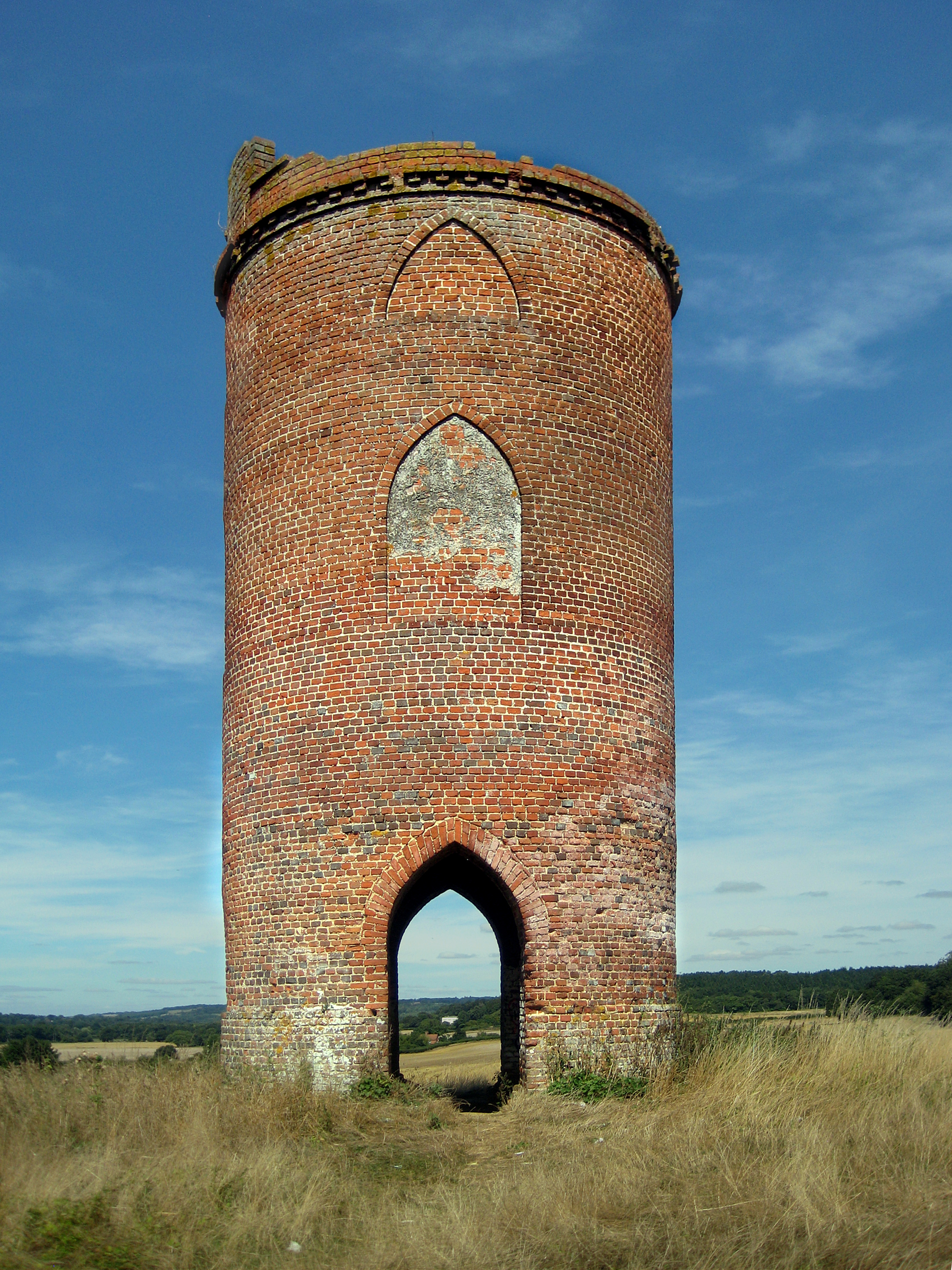
South side of Wilder's Folly, with Sulham House, where Henry Wilder lived, visible in the exact centre of the arch

The brick tower or belvedere on Nunhide Hill was built in 1769 by Reverend Henry Wilder (1744–1814) while he was courting Joan Thoyts (c. 1748–1837), younger sister of John Thoyts of Sulhamstead House. Wilder constructed the tower so that it could be seen from Thoyts' home as well as from his own residence, Sulham House. Sulham House can still be seen through the south arch of Wilder's Folly looking north, but Sulhamstead House is no longer visible from the top of the hill. Wilder and Thoyts were married on 13 June 1769, and had eleven children.

The building featured an open ground-level arcade. The painted first floor room was accessed by an exterior wooden staircase. The two floors above ground level featured glazed ogive windows. The castellated top contained a flat lead roof.

In the late 19th century the building's windows were bricked up and the tower became a dovecote.

== Sources ==
- The Folly Fellowship (2010), "Berkshire Follies" (PDF), Foll-e, no. 27
