= Ashridge Wood =

Nature reserve in Berkshire, England

- Site of Special Scientific Interest
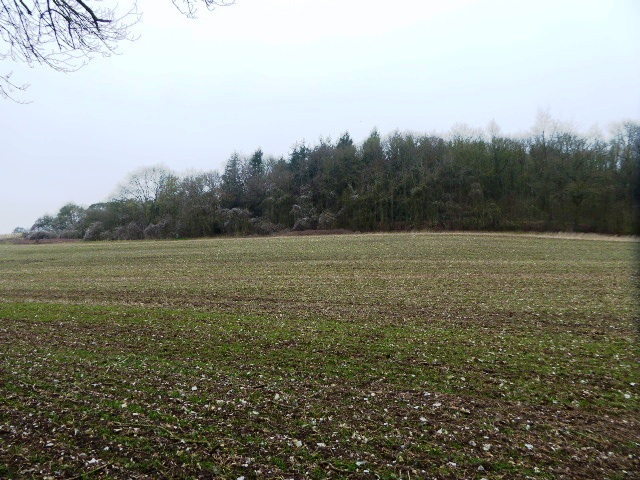

- Location within Berkshire
- Location of Ashridge Wood.
- Area of search: Berkshire
- Grid reference: SU 499 782
- Coordinates: 51.501°N 1.283°W
- Interest: Biological
- Area: 15.9 hectares (39 acres)
- Notification date: 1983
- Location map: Magic Map

Ashridge Wood is a 15.9-hectare (39-acre) biological Site of Special Scientific Interest south-west of Compton in Berkshire. It is in the North Wessex Downs, which is an Area of Outstanding Natural Beauty.

The wood is a surviving section of a once larger ancient coppiced woodland, although part was planted with conifers during the 20th century. It has many flowering woodland plants, including an abundance of Spiked Star-of-Bethlehem Ornithogalum pyrenaicum.

A visit by the Reading & District Natural History Society in June 2009 identified 34 species of flowering plants, 7 different lichens on ash trees within the wood, and 22 species of insects.
