= Compton, Berkshire =

Coordinates: 51.515°N 1.253°W

Compton
- Village and civil parish
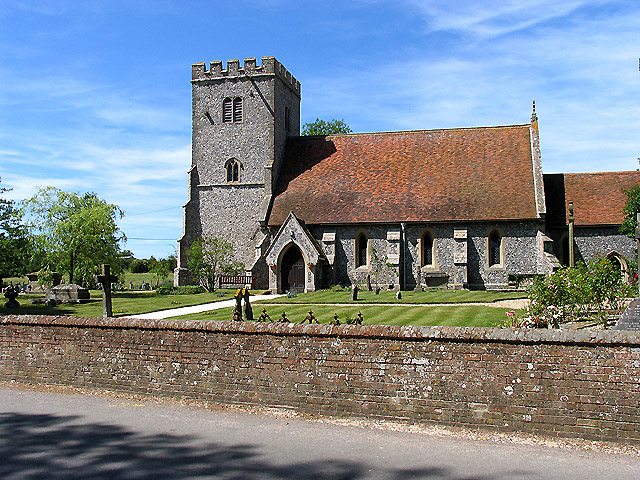
- Medieval church of the ecclesiastical parish of Compton, dedicated to St Mary and St Nicholas

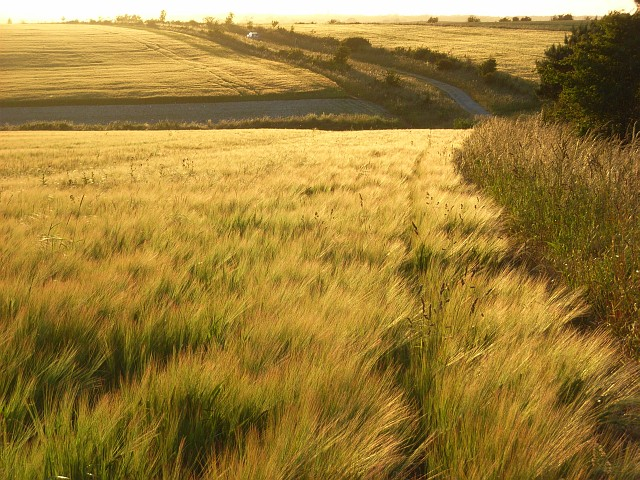
- Fields of barley with narrow roadside hedgerows cover a large portion of Compton.

- Location within Berkshire
- Area: 15.02 km^{2} (5.80 sq mi)
- Population: 1,571 (2011 census)
  - Density: 105/km^{2} (270/sq mi)
- OS grid reference: SU5279
- Civil parish: Compton
- Unitary authority: West Berkshire
- Ceremonial county: Berkshire
- Region: South East
- Country: England
- Sovereign state: United Kingdom
- Post town: Newbury
- Postcode district: RG20
- Dialling code: 01635
- Police: Thames Valley
- Fire: Royal Berkshire
- Ambulance: South Central
- UK Parliament: Reading West and Mid Berkshire
- Website: Compton Parish Council

Compton is a village and civil parish in the River Pang valley in the Berkshire Downs about 6 miles (9.7 km) south of Didcot.

== Geography ==
Compton is buffered from neighbouring settlements by cultivated fields to all sides. The village is in a gently sloped dry valley and the fledgling Pang seasonally enters from the north west and discharges in the south east and may be joined at the centre of the village by the Roden from the north, when winter bournes rise to fill their channels. Elevations vary from 95 to 155 m (312 to 509 ft) AOD. Compton has a site of Special Scientific Interest (SSSI) just to the south west of the village, called Ashridge Wood.

== Parish church ==
The bell tower of the Church of England parish church of Saint Mary and Saint Nicholas was built in the 13th century and has Perpendicular Gothic features that were added in the 15th century. In 1850 the nave and chancel were modernised or rebuilt and in 1905 the Gothic Revival architect John Oldrid Scott added the north aisle.

== Transport ==
=== Former railway ===
In 1882 the Didcot, Newbury and Southampton Railway was completed through the parish and Compton railway station was opened. British Railways withdrew passenger services from the line and closed Compton station in 1962. BR had closed Compton goods yard by 1964. Through freight traffic was withdrawn in 1964 and the line was closed and dismantled during 1967.

=== Bus service ===
From 18 February 2013, Compton is served by Newbury and District bus services 6 and 6A from Newbury.

== Education ==
The academically successful The Downs School local authority secondary school is in Compton. In the 21st century its new science building was named The Hubble after American astro-physicist Edwin Hubble. Compton Church of England Primary School is located on School Road. The school emblem is a stag.

One section of the Institute for Animal Health, now the Pirbright Institute was at Compton, along with the Edward Jenner Institute for Vaccine Research.

=== Industry ===
In 2006 Compton became the founding place of a chemical manufacturing company called Carbosynth. Since 2019, it has merged with Swiss company Biosynth AG within the fine chemical industry and now operates under the name Biosynth^{®}.

== Demography ==
2011 Published Statistics: Population, home ownership and extracts from Physical Environment, surveyed in 2005
Output area	Homes owned outright	Owned with a loan	Socially rented	Privately rented	Other	km^{2} roads	km^{2} water	km^{2} domestic gardens	Usual residents	km^{2}
Civil parish	147	239	134	68	10	0.122	0.011	0.300	1571	15.02

== In popular culture ==
Substantial portions of the BBC Television series Trainer were filmed in and around Compton and the next nearest village, East Ilsley.

== Notable people ==
Footballer Theo Walcott went to Compton Primary School and The Downs School. Theo held the 100m record at The Downs School between 2004 and 2011.

== Sources ==
- Page, William; Ditchfield, P.H., eds. (1924). Victoria County History: A History of the County of Berkshire, Volume 4. pp. 15–21.
- Pevsner, Nikolaus (1966). The Buildings of England: Berkshire. Harmondsworth: Penguin Books. pp. 120–121.
