= Theo Walcott =

English footballer (born 1989)

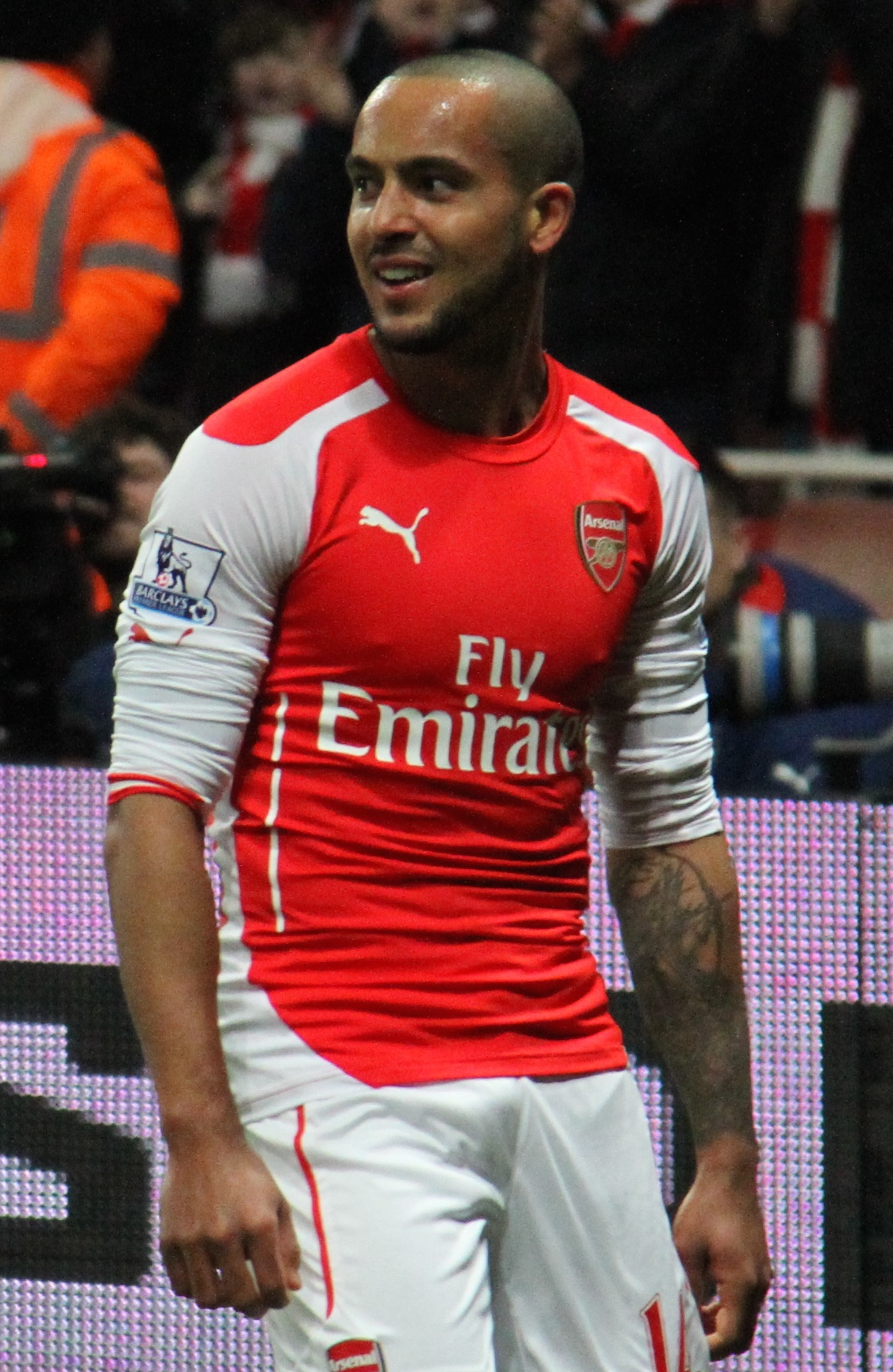
- Walcott playing for Arsenal in 2015

Personal information
- Full name: Theo James Walcott
- Date of birth: 16 March 1989 (age 37)
- Place of birth: Stanmore, England
- Height: 5 ft 9 in (1.76 m)
- Positions: Winger; striker

Youth career
- 1999–2000: Newbury
- 2000: Swindon Town
- 2000–2005: Southampton

Senior career*
Years	Team	Apps	(Gls)
2005–2006	Southampton	21	(4)
2006–2018	Arsenal	270	(65)
2018–2021	Everton	77	(10)
2020–2021	→ Southampton (loan)	21	(3)
2021–2023	Southampton	29	(2)
Total		418	(84)

International career
2004–2005	England U16	4	(0)
2005–2006	England U17	14	(5)
2006	England U19	1	(1)
2006–2010	England U21	21	(6)
2006	England B	1	(0)
2006–2016	England	47	(8)
Medal record
Men's football
Representing England
UEFA European Under-21 Championship
Runner-up	2009 Sweden
- * Club domestic league appearances and goals

Theo James Walcott (born 16 March 1989) is an English former professional footballer who played as a winger and a striker. He represented England at the 2006 World Cup and Euro 2012 and won 47 caps, scoring eight goals. Walcott currently appears as a club ambassador for Arsenal and as a contributor for Sky Sports.

Walcott is a product of the Southampton Academy and started his career with Southampton before joining Arsenal for £5 million in 2006. His speedy pace and ball crossing led his manager Arsène Wenger to deploy him on the wing for most of his career. Walcott played as a striker from the 2012–13 season when he was Arsenal's top scorer, and he has scored more than 100 goals for the club. He joined Everton in January 2018 before he rejoined Southampton, initially on loan, in October 2020.

On 30 May 2006, Walcott became England's youngest-ever senior football player, aged 17 years and 75 days. In December, he received the BBC Young Sports Personality of the Year award. On 6 September 2008, he made his first competitive start in a World Cup qualifier against Andorra, and in the following match against Croatia on 10 September he opened his senior international goals tally and became the youngest player in history to score a hat-trick for England.

== Early life ==
Walcott was born to a black British Jamaican father and a white English mother. He was born in Stanmore, London, but grew up in Compton, Berkshire. He attended Compton Church of England Primary School and The Downs School. He grew up as a Liverpool fan due to his father's support of Liverpool. When Chelsea asked him to be a ball boy, he used the opportunity to meet his Liverpool idols:

"I was playing in a tournament for Swindon when Southampton and Chelsea showed an interest. Chelsea invited me to be a ball-boy for a match against Liverpool and it was fantastic to meet my heroes Michael Owen and Robbie Fowler. I was a Liverpool fan simply because my dad followed them. Unfortunately I wasn't born when the team had their golden era, but I enjoyed watching the likes of Michael Owen, Robbie Fowler and Steve McManaman when I was growing up. When Liverpool won the Champions League last year, I went mad. I was shouting so loud I think I woke up the entire village where I live!"

== Club career ==
=== Early career ===
As a child Walcott started playing football for his local village team and later for nearby Newbury. He scored more than 100 goals in his one and only season for Newbury, before leaving there for Swindon Town. He spent only six months there before leaving for Southampton after he rejected a chance to join Chelsea. Nike agreed to a sponsorship deal with Walcott when he was fourteen years old.

=== Southampton ===
In the 2004–05 season, Walcott starred in the Southampton youth team that reached the final of the FA Youth Cup against Ipswich Town. In addition he became the youngest person to play in the Southampton reserve team, aged 15 years and 175 days, when he came off the bench against Watford in September 2004. However, he did not play in the Premier League, and Southampton were relegated to the Championship at the end of the 2004–05 season.

Before the start of the 2005–06 season, Walcott linked up with the first-team's tour of Scotland, just two weeks after leaving school. He became the youngest-ever player with the Southampton first team, at 16 years and 143 days, after coming on as a substitute in Southampton's 0–0 draw at home to Wolverhampton Wanderers in the Championship.

Walcott made his full first-team debut away to Leeds United on 18 October 2005, and became Southampton's youngest senior goalscorer after 25 minutes of the 2–1 defeat. He scored again away at Millwall four days later, and yet again in his full home debut against Stoke City the following Saturday. His rapid rise to fame also led him to be named amongst the top three finalists for the BBC Young Sports Personality of the Year award on 11 December 2005.

=== Arsenal ===
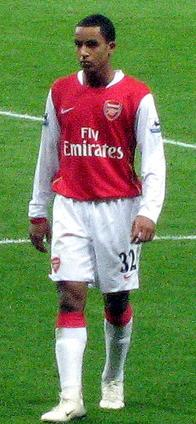
Walcott playing for Arsenal in 2007

Walcott transferred to Arsenal on 20 January 2006, for a fee of £5 million, rising to £12 million depending on appearances for club and country. The original fee, payable by instalments reported in The Times as £5 million down, five increments of £1 million to be paid after each set of ten Premier League appearances, and £2 million in "bonus payments", was revised down to £9.1 million in a compromise settlement agreed in March 2008. Walcott initially joined as a scholar, having agreed to sign a professional contract on his 17th birthday on 16 March 2006. In September 2008, manager Arsène Wenger confirmed that Tottenham Hotspur, Chelsea and Liverpool had all been interested in signing him.

==== 2006–07 season ====
Walcott made his Premier League debut on 19 August 2006, the first day of the 2006–07 season, coming on as a substitute against Aston Villa and setting up a goal for Gilberto Silva. His next appearance was four days later in the Champions League, in the second leg of Arsenal's third qualifying round match against Dinamo Zagreb; he became the youngest-ever Arsenal player to appear in European competition, a record since beaten by Jack Wilshere. Within minutes of coming on, Walcott received his first yellow card in Arsenal colours for taking a shot several seconds after the referee had already blown for offside. During stoppage time, his cross beat the Dinamo defence and Mathieu Flamini scored, giving Arsenal a 2–1 win, their first in the new Emirates Stadium, and giving Walcott his second assist in two substitute appearances. His first start came in a home league match against Watford on 14 October 2006. Walcott's exploits with Arsenal and England earned him the BBC Young Sports Personality of the Year award at the end of 2006.

Walcott's first goal for Arsenal came in the 2007 League Cup Final against Chelsea at the Millennium Stadium, Cardiff, on 25 February 2007. His 12th-minute strike was overshadowed by events later on in the match: John Terry was knocked unconscious, Didier Drogba scored twice to give Chelsea a 2–1 victory and three players were sent off following a mass brawl. A persistent shoulder injury limited his performance, and Arsène Wenger said that after the injury, "he was 50 per cent of what he was before."

==== 2007–2010 ====
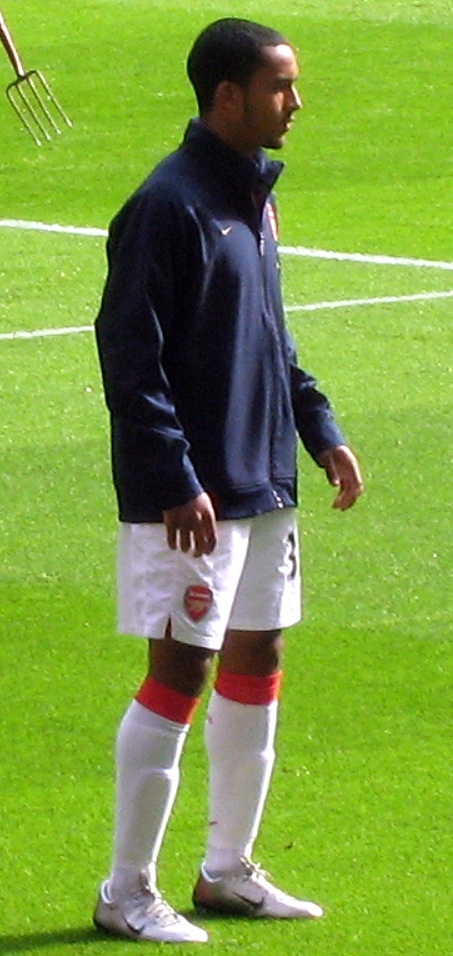
Walcott warming up with Arsenal in 2007

Walcott's first home goals of the 2007–08 season were scored in a Champions League match against Slavia Prague, which Arsenal won 7–0; he also set up a goal for Cesc Fàbregas. Walcott scored his first two Premier League goals in a 2–2 draw with Birmingham City at St Andrew's on 23 February 2008. In the Champions League quarter-final on 8 April, Walcott "beat six Liverpool defenders during a magical run from inside his own half before squaring for [Emmanuel] Adebayor to sidefoot home" for a late equaliser, but Liverpool scored twice more to take the match 4–2 and the tie 5–3 on aggregate. A couple of weeks later, Wenger claimed that Walcott had made the shift from boy to man, but was not yet a monster. He finished the season with seven goals in all competitions and four in the league.

For the 2008–09 season, Walcott changed his shirt number from 32 to 14, as previously worn by his idol, Thierry Henry. He had wanted number 8, but that had already been taken by Samir Nasri. He established himself as a first-team regular, starting many matches on the right of midfield or on the wing. On 18 October, Walcott scored his first Premier League goal of the season, Arsenal's third as they came back from 1–0 down to beat Everton 3–1. Three days later, he scored Arsenal's second in a 5–2 win away to Fenerbahçe in the 2008–09 Champions League, rounding the goalkeeper before finishing from a tight angle.

Walcott dislocated his right shoulder in November while training with England for a friendly against Germany. He underwent surgery to correct a hereditary weakness, and returned to action in March, but at the end of the season he still felt that it was hampering his performance. In April 2009, he scored against Wigan Athletic, before, four days later in the Champions League quarter-final second leg, he gave his team a 10th-minute lead against Villarreal after receiving a pass from Fàbregas and flicking the ball over the goalkeeper. Arsenal won 4–1 on aggregate.

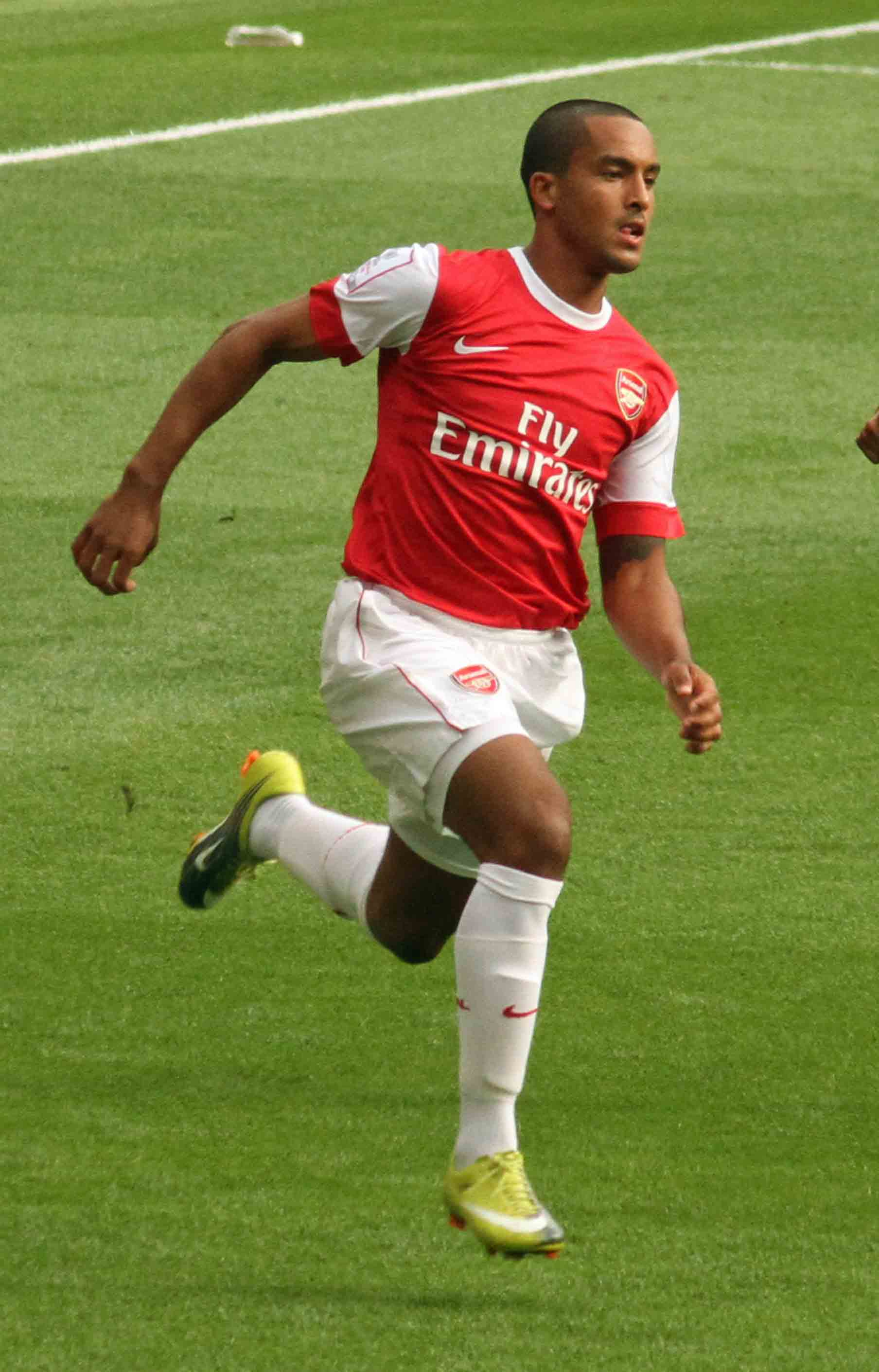
Walcott playing for Arsenal in 2010

In the next match, an FA Cup semi-final against Chelsea, Walcott put Arsenal ahead in the first half, although they eventually lost 2–1. Three days later, Walcott came off to the bench to run half the length of the field before squaring for Andrey Arshavin to put Arsenal 4–3 up against Liverpool in the 90th minute; the match finished 4–4. In May 2009 he signed a new long-term contract with Arsenal.

Walcott's 2009–10 season was marred by injury: he made only 15 starts in all competitions. Problems with lower back, knee and hamstring meant he did not play a full 90 minutes until 9 December, against Olympiacos in the Champions League, as Arsenal, already qualified for the knockout stages, fielded the youngest team ever to start a match in that competition. On 6 March 2010, Walcott scored his second goal of the season against Burnley in a 3–1 victory to give Arsenal a decisive lead, with a left-footed effort from the edge of the box, after cutting inside from the right flank.

For the first hour of the Champions League quarter-final first leg, Arsenal were outclassed by Barcelona, although only two goals behind. Walcott's appearance off the bench was the turning point. He scored within three minutes of entering the match, "brought speed and fearlessness to the hosts' attacks", and was involved in the move that led to Fàbregas' equaliser from the penalty spot. After much debate, Wenger reacted to Walcott's performance by starting him in the second leg. According to BBC Sport's match report, Barcelona manager Pep Guardiola "anticipated his inclusion by bringing in the pacy Eric Abidal" to mark him, and Walcott's main contribution was to set up Nicklas Bendtner's opening goal in a 4–1 defeat.

==== 2010–2013 ====
Walcott's start to the 2010–11 season was particularly successful, winning Arsenal's Player of the Month vote in August by a landslide. In the second match of the new Premier League season, Walcott scored the first hat-trick of his club career as Arsenal beat newly promoted Blackpool 6–0. On 27 December 2010, he scored a goal and made an assist to help beat Chelsea 3–1 in what Arsène Wenger dubbed a "must-win" match.

Interviewed after Arsenal's FA Cup third-round tie against Leeds United in January 2011, Walcott admitted diving in the last minute of the match in an unsuccessful attempt to win a penalty kick. He was fouled soon afterward, legitimately winning a penalty which was converted by Fàbregas to secure a draw and a replay of the fixture – which Arsenal won. On 21 February, during the 1–0 victory against Stoke City, Walcott caught his studs in the turf, sustaining an ankle injury that ruled him out of the League Cup final and the Champions League last-16 second leg against Barcelona. On the last day of the season, he came off the bench to score the equaliser in a 2–2 draw away to Fulham, and ended up with a then career high of 9 goals in the Premier League and 13 in all competitions.

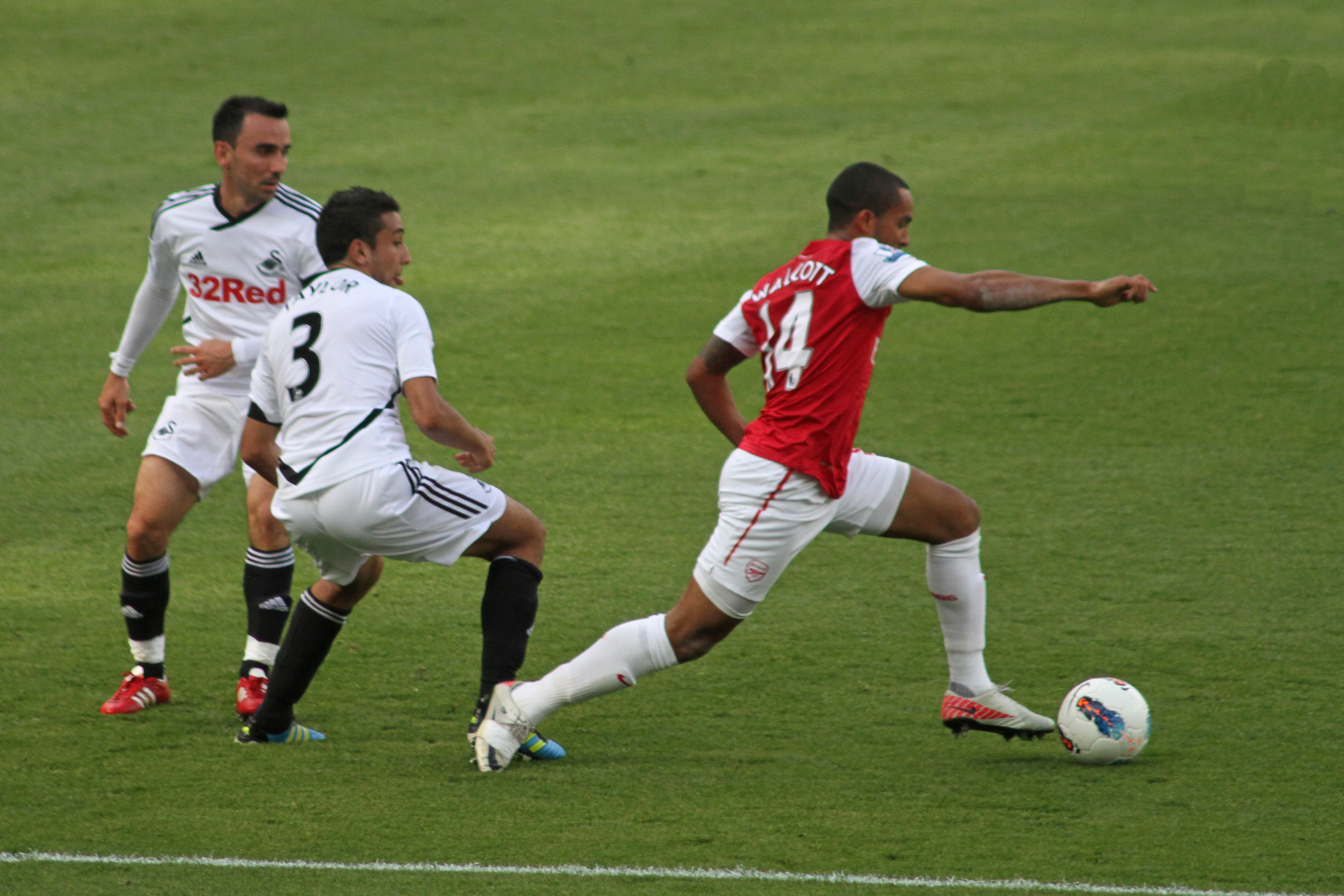
Walcott (right) playing for Arsenal in 2011

On 16 August, Walcott scored his first goal of the season in the first leg of a Champions League qualifying match against Udinese, giving a vital 1–0 win to Arsenal to carry on into the second leg of the tie. Walcott scored again in the second leg as Arsenal came from behind to win 2–1 and 3–1 on aggregate which helped Arsenal secure qualification for the lucrative group stage of the competition for the 14th straight season. Walcott scored Arsenal's first goal in the 2011–12 Premier League campaign against Manchester United, though this was a mere consolation as Arsenal lost 8–2. He netted his fourth goal on 29 October in a 5–3 win at Chelsea where he picked up the ball on the wing, slipped, then got up and jinked past two Chelsea players before scoring.

Walcott scored his first goal of 2012 in the 3–2 defeat at Swansea City, chipping the ball over Swans goalkeeper Michel Vorm. On 4 February 2012, he was involved in the build-up for three goals in the 7–1 home victory against Blackburn Rovers, setting up two goals for Robin van Persie and one for Alex Oxlade-Chamberlain. On 26 February, Walcott scored two second-half goals against Tottenham Hotspur to help them win 5–2 after being 0–2 down in the North London derby. On 24 March, Walcott scored Arsenal's second goal in a 3–0 home win over Aston Villa before being substituted by Oxlade-Chamberlain in the 78th minute. An injury in a 0–0 draw with Chelsea on 21 April looked set to rule Walcott out for the rest of the season but he was able to return in a substitute appearance on the last day of the season in a 3–2 win for Arsenal over West Bromwich Albion.

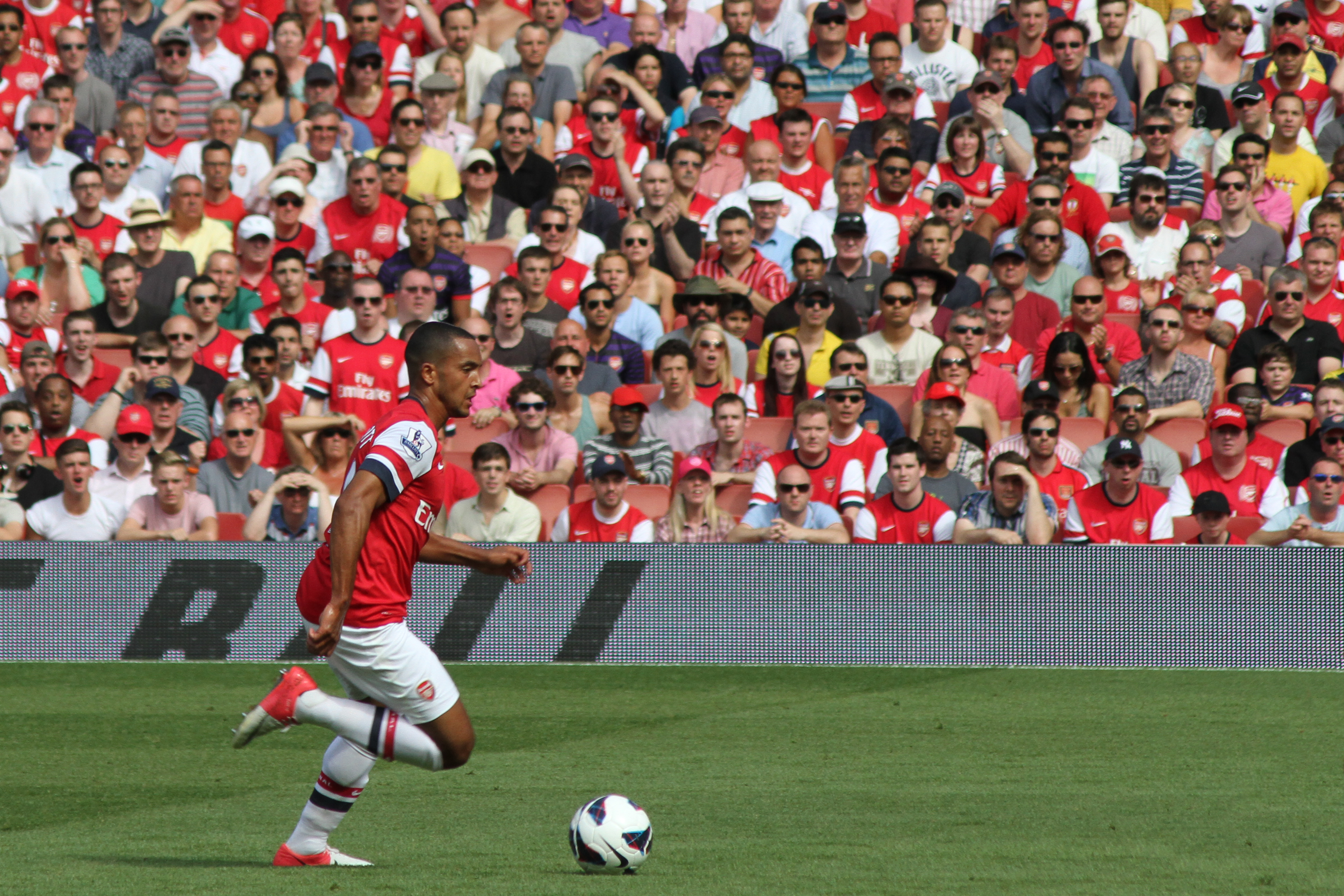
Walcott playing for Arsenal in 2012

On 15 September 2012, Walcott came on as a substitute for Gervinho and scored his first goal of the season in a 6–1 win over his former club Southampton. On 26 September, he scored twice in a 6–1 win against Coventry City in the League Cup. On 30 October, Walcott scored Arsenal's first goal in first half stoppage time and their fourth goal in second half stoppage time in a League Cup tie at Reading to help the club complete a comeback from 4–0 down to 4–4. Arsenal won 7–5 in extra time, in which Walcott completed his hat-trick and backed up his argument that he should be played as a striker. Former Gunner Niall Quinn praised Walcott's performance as incredible, in what he described as "the most extraordinary game that I've seen." This took him to five League Cup goals for the season, a total which would make him the top scorer in the 2012–13 competition.

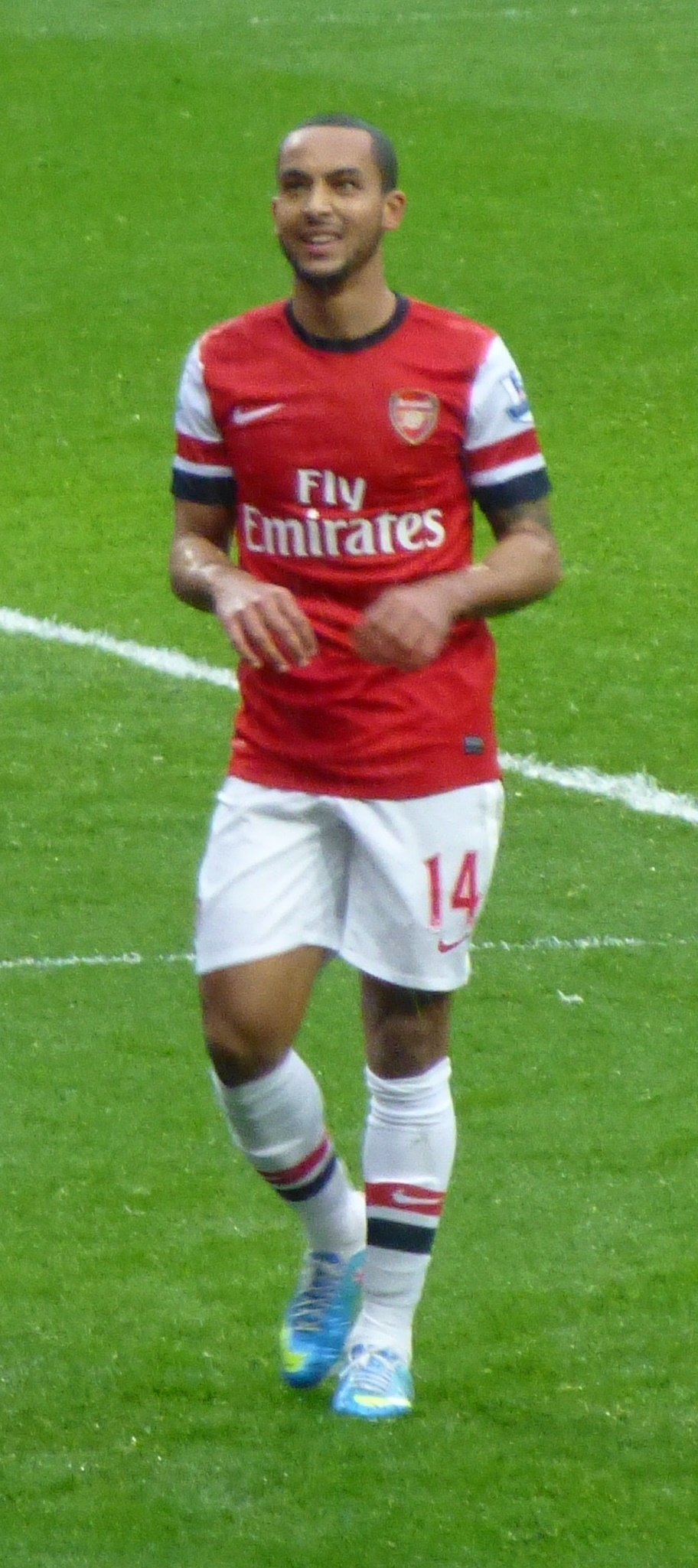
Walcott playing for Arsenal in 2013

On 29 December, Walcott was deployed as a lone striker and scored his first Premier League hat-trick of the season and provided two assists in an emphatic 7–3 win over Newcastle United. One of Walcott's strikes against Newcastle was voted as the Goal of the Month for November on the BBC's Match of the Day. On 18 January 2013, Walcott ended speculation about his future when he signed a new three-and-a-half-year contract with Arsenal. Two days later Walcott scored Arsenal's only goal in a 2–1 defeat to Chelsea. This started a run of four successive matches in which he scored, with Walcott also scoring in a 5–1 win against West Ham United on 23 January, a 3–2 win against Brighton & Hove Albion in the FA Cup and a 2–2 draw at home to Liverpool. He scored his 20th goal of the season against Queens Park Rangers after just 20 seconds. The match ended 1–0 and Walcott's goal became the fastest goal of the Premier League that season. Walcott scored another goal in a 4–1 victory over Wigan Athletic which resulted in Wigan's relegation. Walcott finished the season with 14 goals and 12 assists from 32 Premier League matches and scoring 21 times with 16 assists in all competitions to be Arsenal's top scorer.

==== 2013–2017 ====
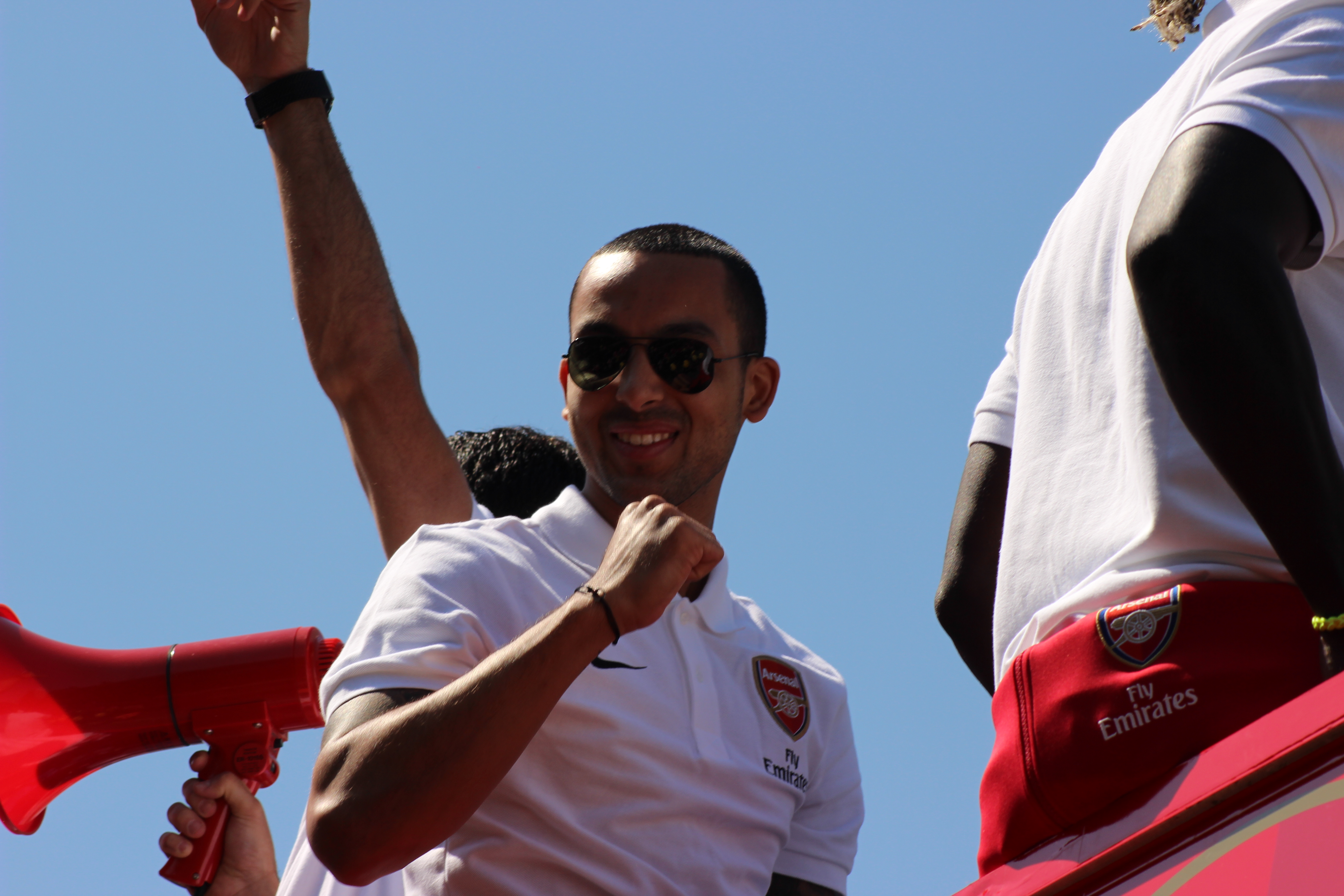
Walcott celebrating with teammates and fans at a parade after winning the 2013–14 FA Cup

Walcott started the 2013–14 campaign in good form, registering assists against Fenerbahçe in the Champions League play-off round as well as against Fulham and Tottenham Hotspur in the Premier League, and scoring against Olympique de Marseille in the Champions League group stage. He suffered an abdominal injury in late September that required surgery, and was out of action for two months, returning against his former club Southampton in late November.

He appeared as a substitute in Arsenal's next four fixtures, assisting goals against Cardiff City and Everton, and started his first match since returning from injury, against Manchester City on 14 December. He scored twice against City, but could not prevent Arsenal from losing the match 6–3. On 26 December, his two goals against West Ham United included the first headed goal of his club career. Walcott injured a knee late in the FA Cup third-round tie against Tottenham Hotspur at the Emirates Stadium in January 2014. In response to abuse from the area holding the visiting fans while he was being stretchered off, Walcott made a hand gesture that reflected the 2–0 scoreline, and he and the stretcher-bearers were pelted with coins and other missiles thrown from that area. The FA "reminded him of his responsibilities", but took no further action. The injury, a ruptured anterior cruciate ligament of his left knee, meant he was ruled out for at least six months, so would miss the rest of the season and the 2014 FIFA World Cup.

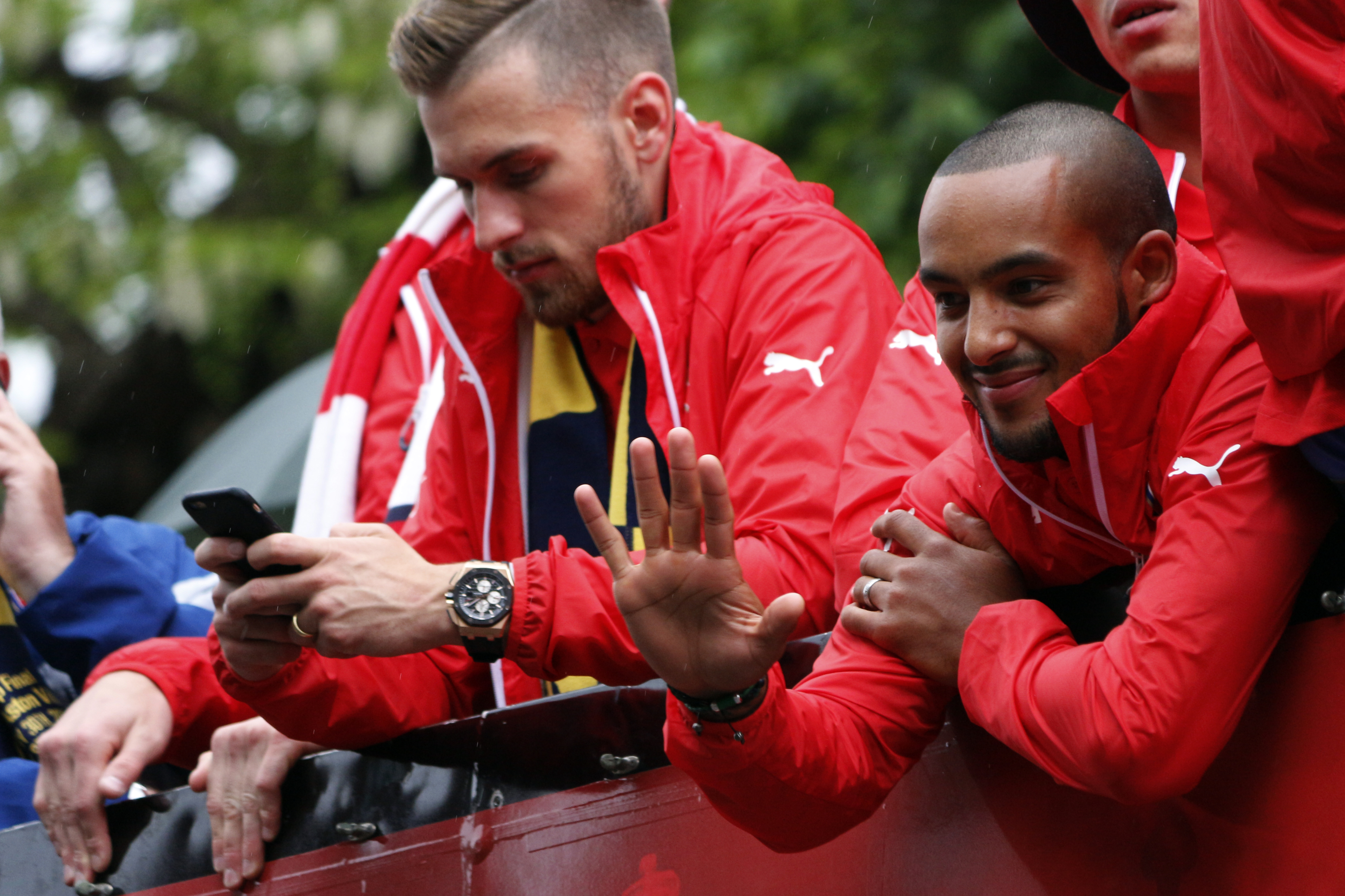
Walcott (right) at Arsenal's 2014–15 FA Cup winner's parade

On 1 November 2014, Walcott came off the bench in the 81st minute during a 3–0 Premier League home victory against Burnley for his first Gunners appearance in ten months. He made his first start of the season against Hull City in the third round of the FA Cup on 4 January 2015, exactly a year after sustaining his injury at the same stage of the competition. On 25 January, Walcott scored his first goal of 2014–15 campaign in the second minute of Arsenal's 3–2 FA Cup fourth-round win at Brighton & Hove Albion. In Arsenal's final match of the league season, Walcott scored a 34-minute hat-trick against West Bromwich Albion at the Emirates Stadium. On 30 May, Walcott was selected to start at centre forward for Arsenal in the 2015 FA Cup Final, scoring the opening goal in the team's 4–0 victory against Aston Villa.

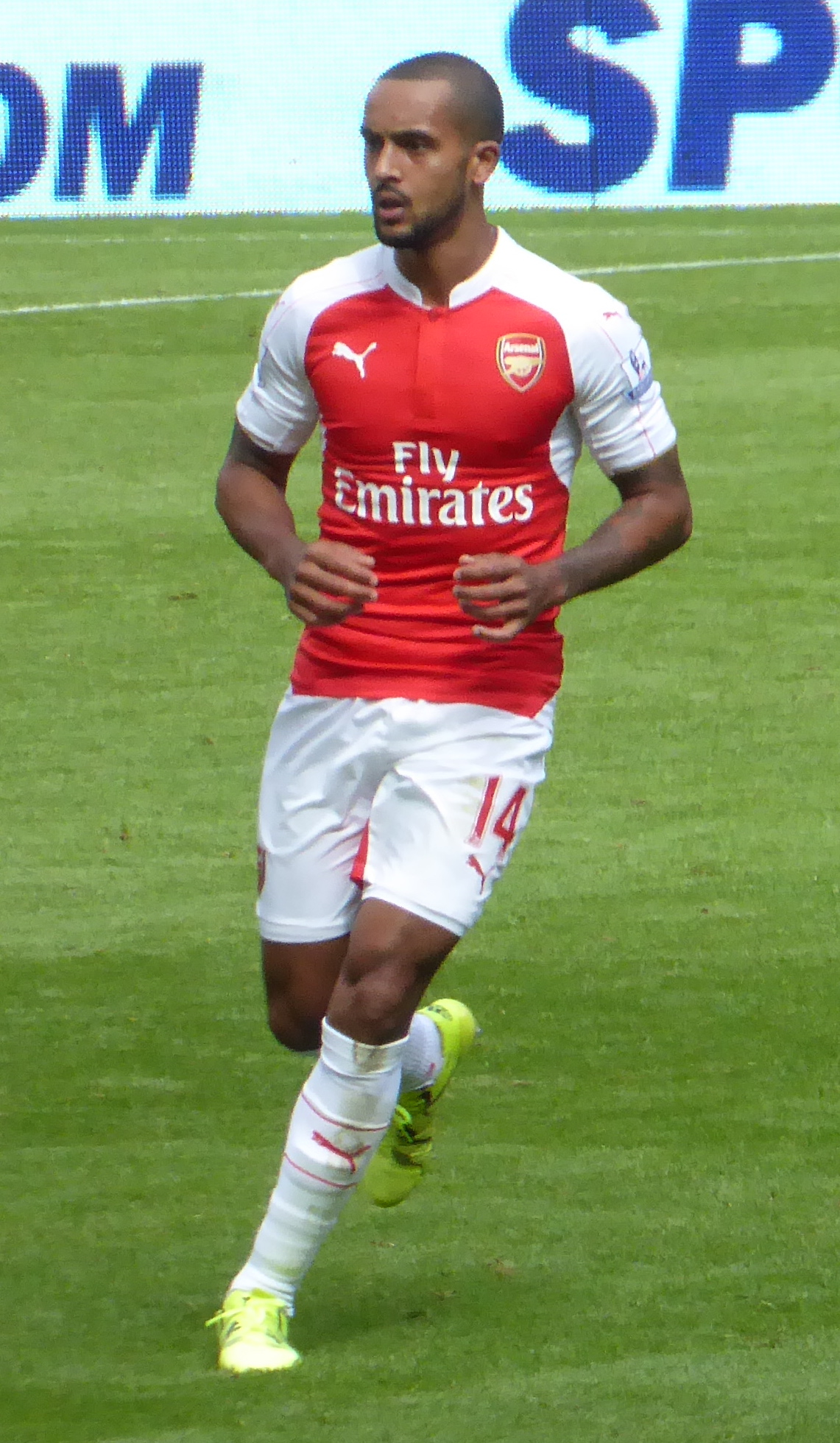
Walcott playing for Arsenal in 2015

Ahead of the new season, it was announced that Walcott had extended his contract with Arsenal after prolonged negotiations. Walcott netted twice in pre-season in wins against Everton and Wolfsburg, as Arsenal won the Premier League Asia Trophy and the Emirates Cup. He began the 2015–16 season starting at centre forward and assisting Alex Oxlade-Chamberlain's winning goal in the 1–0 defeat of Chelsea in the 2015 FA Community Shield on 2 August 2015.

On 12 September, Walcott scored his first goal of the season in a 2–0 home victory against Stoke City in the 2015–16 Premier League. He netted three more times in September, including the opener in a 5–2 league win at Leicester City and in back-to-back UEFA Champions League defeats to Dinamo Zagreb and Olympiacos; in the latter of these he picked up an assist for an Alexis Sánchez header. His performances saw him voted Arsenal Supporters' Player of the Month for September. He registered another two assists in a 3–0 home league win over Manchester United on 4 October. On 21 December, Walcott opened the scoring in a 2–1 league defeat of Manchester City at the Emirates. On 8 March, Walcott scored a brace in a 4–0 away victory over Hull City in an FA Cup replay

Walcott started Arsenal's opening match of the 2016–17 season against Liverpool, in which he missed a penalty after being brought down by Alberto Moreno, however, he made-up for his earlier miss by scoring Arsenal's opener, however Arsenal still lost the match 3–4. Walcott scored his second goal of the season and his 100th career goal after linking up with Alex Iwobi to chip the ball over Hull City goalkeeper Eldin Jakupović to score Arsenal's second goal in a 4–1 win. He then netted his first Champions League goals of the season with a brace in a 2–0 win over Basel on 30 September.

On 17 December 2016, Walcott scored the opening goal of a 2–1 loss at Manchester City before being substituted with a calf injury. He returned on 28 January 2017, scoring a hat-trick against former club Southampton in the fourth round of the FA Cup at St. Mary's Stadium. He scored his 100th goal for Arsenal on 20 February in the next round of the FA Cup in a 2–0 victory over Sutton United. On 5 April, Walcott captained Arsenal to a 3–0 win in their league match at The Emirates against London rivals West Ham United; he scored the second goal, which was his 19th and last of the season and took his total to 104. He was an unused substitute as Arsenal beat Chelsea 2–1 in the 2017 FA Cup Final.

==== 2017–18 season ====
With the scores tied at 1–1 after normal time, Walcott converted his kick as Arsenal beat Chelsea 4–1 on penalties to win the 2017 Community Shield, but throughout his last season at Arsenal, he was mainly used in the Europa League and in the EFL Cup, and he only made 6 substitute appearances in the Premier League. By October, he was increasingly on the fringes at Arsenal, and was criticised following a poor performance when made captain in a 2–1 League Cup victory at home to Championship side Norwich City. with Arsenal's second highest goalscorer Ian Wright suggesting that for Walcott's own good, he needed to leave the club, a view with which Wenger disagreed. Walcott did score four goals during his last season at the club, against Doncaster Rovers in the League Cup, and three in the Europa League group stage, all coming against BATE Borisov, with two away, and one at home.

=== Everton ===
On 17 January 2018, Walcott signed a three-and-a-half-year contract with Everton in what the BBC reported as "a deal worth more than £20m". He made his debut for the club three days later, providing the assist for Oumar Niasse's equaliser in a 1–1 draw at home to West Bromwich Albion in the Premier League. He then recorded a brace in his next match, a 2–1 win over Leicester.

==== 2020–21: Loan to Southampton ====
On 5 October 2020, Walcott rejoined Southampton on loan. On 17 October, he played for Southampton again for the first time since 2006 and provided an assist to Jannik Vestergaard's 92nd minute equaliser in a 3–3 draw against Chelsea in the Premier League. Walcott scored his first goal since rejoining the club in a 1–1 draw against Wolves on 23 November. He would score again in a 1–1 draw against his former side Arsenal in the league on 16 December.

=== Return to Southampton ===
On 18 May 2021, Walcott signed a permanent two-year contract at Southampton which activated after his current loan deal with Everton expired at the end of June. On 14 August 2021, Walcott made his first appearance since joining Southampton against Everton in a 3–1 defeat. Walcott would not score during the 2021–22 season.

On 23 October 2022, Walcott made his first appearance of the 2022–23 season in a 1–1 draw against Arsenal, replacing Adam Armstrong in the 73rd minute. On 18 March 2023, Walcott scored his first goal since his permanent move back to Southampton in a 3–3 draw against Tottenham Hotspur. On 21 April, he scored the second goal of a 3–3 away draw against former club Arsenal. On 28 May 2023, Walcott confirmed his exit from Southampton following the conclusion of the season, but expressed his desire to continue playing football.

On 18 August 2023, Walcott announced his retirement from football, bringing an end to a career that spanned 563 club appearances and 47 England caps.

== International career ==
=== 2006 World Cup ===
On 8 May 2006, 17-year old Walcott was named in Sven-Göran Eriksson's squad for the 2006 FIFA World Cup.

On 25 May 2006, Walcott came on as a second-half substitute for the England B team against Belarus. On 30 May 2006, he became England's youngest-ever senior player by appearing in a 3–1 friendly win over Hungary at Old Trafford aged 17 years and 75 days. Despite being one of only two fully fit strikers in the England squad (the other being Peter Crouch), he did not play during the tournament. Eriksson defended his decision, claiming that the experience would serve Walcott well for future tournaments.

After the World Cup, Eriksson stepped down as England manager. New appointment Steve McClaren put Walcott into the England Under-21s, claiming he was "toughening up" on his squad selections.

=== 2007 and 2009 Under-21 European Championships ===
On 15 August 2006, Walcott became the youngest player ever to score for the England under-21 team when he scored the opener after three minutes in England's 2–2 draw with Moldova at Ipswich Town's ground Portman Road. The match against Moldova was his first cap for the England under-21s.

Walcott scored two goals against Germany to seal qualification for England to the Under-21 European Championship, in the playoff second leg in October 2006, with his second drawing comparisons with Thierry Henry. Over the summer of 2009, Walcott participated in England under-21 team's 2009 UEFA European Under-21 Championship campaign despite protestations from his club manager, Arsène Wenger. Wenger complained that Walcott's participation in the tournament as well as matches with the senior squad would lead to burn out and injury.

England reached the final of the U21 Euros, where they lost 4–0 to Germany, with Walcott thus earning a silver medal as a runner-up.

=== 2010 World Cup qualification and omission from Finals ===
On 6 September 2008, Walcott made his first competitive start in a World Cup qualifier against Andorra, and in the following match against Croatia on 10 September he opened his senior international goals tally and became the youngest player in history to score a hat-trick for England. In doing so, Walcott also became the first England player to score a hat-trick in a competitive match since Michael Owen in 2001.

Walcott returned to the international fold on 3 March 2010 in a friendly against Egypt. It was his first international start for nine months. He faded after a bright start and was replaced by Shaun Wright-Phillips after 57 minutes as England recovered from a goal down to beat Egypt 3–1 at Wembley Stadium. His performance came under heavy criticism from Chris Waddle who said of Walcott, "I've never seen him develop. He just doesn't understand the game for me – where to be running, when to run inside a full back, when to just play a one-two. It's all off the cuff. I just don't think he's got a football brain and he's going to have problems. Let's be honest, good defenders would catch him offside every time."

Walcott started England's friendly victories against Mexico and Japan in May 2010. However, on 1 June 2010, it was announced that Walcott had been left out of England's 23-man World Cup squad by Fabio Capello. On 4 July, a few days after England's exit from the World Cup, Lionel Messi said that he was shocked by Walcott's exclusion as he believed that Walcott could have made the difference against Germany and Algeria. In January 2011, Capello admitted that he had made a mistake in not selecting Walcott for the 2010 World Cup.

=== Euro 2012 ===
In the Euro 2012 qualifying match against Switzerland on 7 September 2010, Walcott was stretchered off after he was clipped in the build-up to Wayne Rooney's opener for England after 10 minutes putting him out of action for several weeks.

At UEFA Euro 2012, Walcott appeared for England as a second-half substitute in the group match against Sweden. Shortly after coming on, Walcott scored to bring the match level at 2–2. Less than 15 minutes later, he provided the cross for Danny Welbeck's 74th-minute winner in England's 3–2 victory. Afterwards, England manager Roy Hodgson praised Walcott's "enormous" impact on the match, while Lee Dixon on the BBC said Walcott had "changed the game". Walcott also played in the final group match against Ukraine which England won 1–0.

=== 2014 World Cup Qualifying ===
Walcott started in England's 5–0 win against San Marino, but was injured in an early clash with the goalkeeper Aldo Simoncini. After treatment on the touchline, he was substituted for Aaron Lennon, and then taken to hospital as a precaution, where he underwent "scans and tests" according to England manager Roy Hodgson, Walcott was later ruled out of England's next match against Poland, he did not start a match in the qualifiers until almost a year later on 6 September, when he played the full 90 minutes in the 4–0 win against Moldova, he also played 87 minutes in the following match against Ukraine, which ended in a 0–0 draw, but he was injured before England's match against Montenegro and he was still out against Poland, which England won 2–0 to qualify for the 2014 FIFA World Cup, in Brazil.

=== Euro 2016 omission and World Cup 2018 qualifying ===
Having missed out on the 2014 World Cup through injury, Walcott was not selected by Roy Hodgson for the 26-man provisional Euro 2016 squad announced in May 2016. Hodgson commented, "Theo unfortunately has not got such a regular match over the last few months and has had a few problems with injury. It's a tough decision but it's one you have to take."

Walcott was informed by England manager Gareth Southgate on 16 March 2017, his 28th birthday, that he was being dropped from the squad to play a friendly against Germany and a 2018 FIFA World Cup qualifier against Lithuania, despite scoring 17 goals in 29 appearances in all club competitions during the 2016–17 season. Southgate said that Walcott had not transferred his early season form into the England matches against Malta and Slovenia in October 2016 and Spain in November 2016. The appearance against Spain would prove to be Walcott's final appearance for England.

== Style of play ==
Walcott was well known for his rapid pace, with then Barcelona manager Pep Guardiola declaring that "you would need a pistol to stop him." He has been likened by Arsenal manager Arsène Wenger to the club's all-time leading scorer, Thierry Henry. FIFA World Player of the Year winner Lionel Messi has described Walcott as "one of the most dangerous players I have ever played against." In addition to his speed, Walcott also possessed good balance, movement and technique.

== Outside football ==
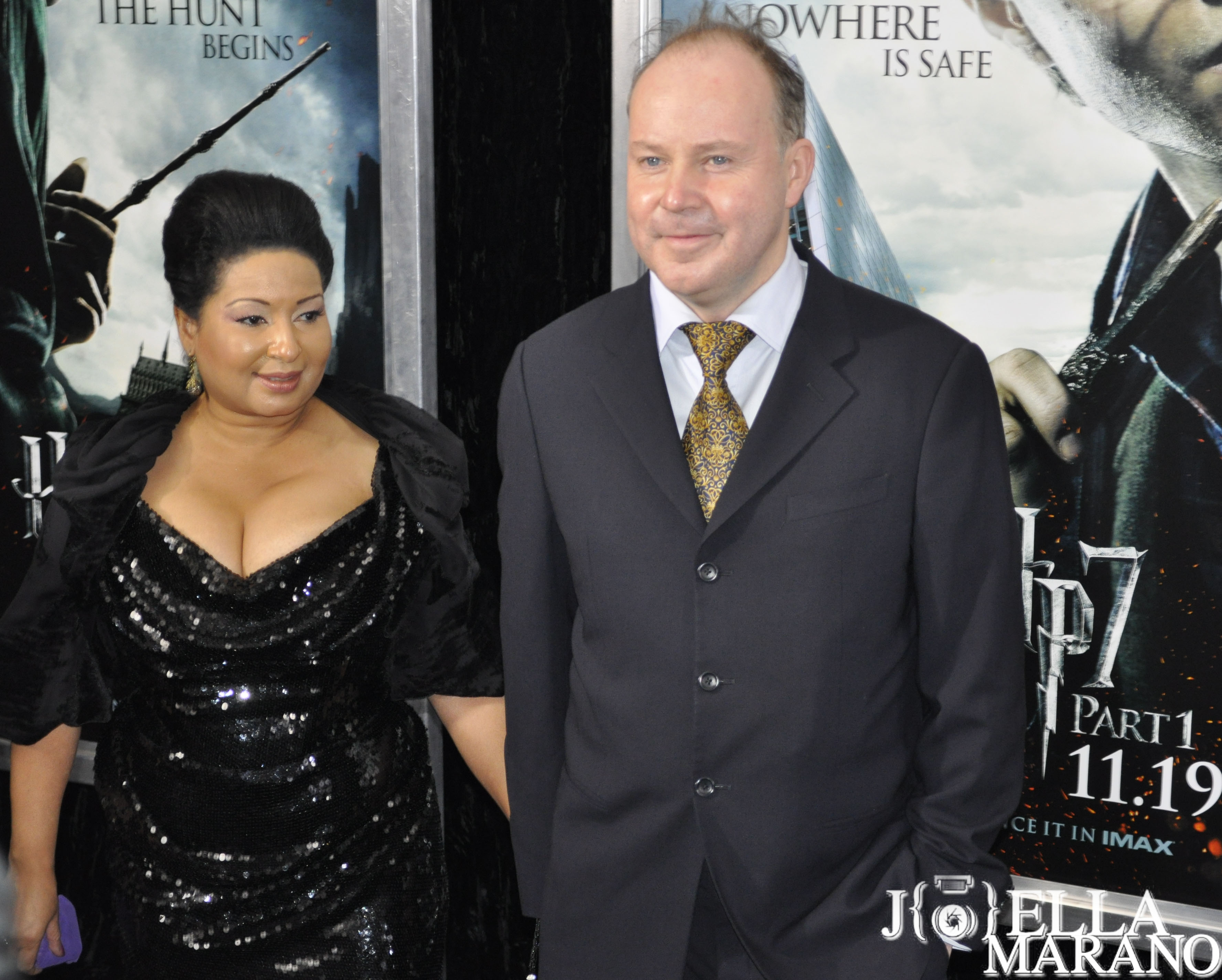
Theo's aunt Yvonne Walcott with her husband David Yates

=== Personal life ===
His family made a cameo appearance in the 2007 film Harry Potter and the Order of the Phoenix, directed by David Yates, the uncle of Walcott. Walcott himself was due to appear as well, but his commitments to Arsenal forced him to drop out. His cousin Jacob Walcott was a trainee at Reading and a member of the England national under-17 football team appearing in the 2009 UEFA European Under-17 Championship. His older sister, Hollie, is a bodybuilder who came second in the British Natural Bodybuilding Federation Central Championships in July 2010.

Walcott has been in a long-term relationship with Melanie Slade, after meeting in 2004 at the WestQuay shopping centre in Southampton. The couple married at the Castello di Vincigliata in Tuscany, Italy, in June 2013. Their first son Finley James Walcott was born on 10 April 2014, with their second son, Arlo, being born on 26 November 2016.

Walcott has been involved with the UK charities Build a School and Best Beginnings. He also has a pie named in his honour at the Arsenal pie shop in Holloway, which won a gold award at the British Pie Awards of 2015.

On 6 April 2008, Walcott was a torchbearer for the Olympic Flame for Beijing 2008 as it was paraded around London. He was the penultimate torchbearer just before Dame Kelly Holmes.

=== Endorsements ===
When Walcott was 14 years old, he signed an endorsement deal with American sportswear and equipment supplier, Nike. In November 2012 he appeared in an advert for the new Nike Green Speed II alongside Eden Hazard and Raheem Sterling.

In February 2015, Walcott announced a new sponsorship deal with Adidas. Walcott appeared in an advert for Adidas in August 2016, showing off his skills in dribbling and flicking a ball into the open top of a wheelie bin.

Walcott features in EA Sports' FIFA video game series. One of his goal celebrations – 'pat-a-cake' dance with Mesut Özil – appears in FIFA 14.

=== Books ===
Walcott currently has four published books – "T.J. and the Hat-Trick", "T.J. and the Penalty", "T.J. and the Winning Goal" and "T.J. and the Cup Run". The first two were published in April 2010, with the latter two being published in August 2010. All four were published by Corgi Children's.

In August 2011, Walcott's autobiography Theo: Growing Up Fast was published by Bantam Press. The book caused controversy because of his criticism of England manager Fabio Capello, whom he describes as "cold and clinical".

=== Media career ===
In the summer of 2024, Walcott joined Match Of The Day as a studio analyst.

== Career statistics ==
=== Club ===
Appearances and goals by club, season and competition
Club	Season	League			FA Cup		League Cup		Europe		Other		Total	
Club	Season	Division	Apps	Goals	Apps	Goals	Apps	Goals	Apps	Goals	Apps	Goals	Apps	Goals
Southampton	2005–06	Championship	21	4	1	1	1	0	—		—		23	5
Arsenal	2005–06	Premier League	0	0	—		—		0	0	—		0	0
Arsenal	2006–07	Premier League	16	0	4	0	6	1	6 (Note: Appearances in UEFA Champions League)	0	—		32	1
Arsenal	2007–08	Premier League	25	4	1	0	4	1	9	2	—		39	7
Arsenal	2008–09	Premier League	22	2	3	1	0	0	10	3	—		35	6
Arsenal	2009–10	Premier League	23	3	1	0	0	0	6	1	—		30	4
Arsenal	2010–11	Premier League	28	9	1	0	4	2	5	2	—		38	13
Arsenal	2011–12	Premier League	35	8	3	1	0	0	8	2	—		46	11
Arsenal	2012–13	Premier League	32	14	4	1	2	5	5	1	—		43	21
Arsenal	2013–14	Premier League	13	5	1	0	0	0	4	1	—		18	6
Arsenal	2014–15	Premier League	14	5	5	2	0	0	2	0	0	0	21	7
Arsenal	2015–16	Premier League	28	5	5	2	2	0	6	2	1 (Note: Appearance in FA Community Shield)	0	42	9
Arsenal	2016–17	Premier League	28	10	3	5	0	0	6	4	—		37	19
Arsenal	2017–18	Premier League	6	0	1	0	3	1	5 (Note: Appearances in UEFA Europa League)	3	1	0	16	4
Arsenal	Total		270	65	32	12	21	10	72	21	2	0	397	108
Everton	2017–18	Premier League	14	3	—		—		—		—		14	3
Everton	2018–19	Premier League	37	5	1	0	2	1	—		—		40	6
Everton	2019–20	Premier League	25	2	1	0	3	0	—		—		29	2
Everton	2020–21	Premier League	1	0	—		1	0	—		—		2	0
Everton	Total		77	10	2	0	6	1	—		—		85	11
Southampton (loan)	2020–21	Premier League	21	3	2	0	—		—		—		23	3
Southampton	2021–22	Premier League	9	0	1	0	2	0	—		—		12	0
Southampton	2022–23	Premier League	20	2	2	0	2	0	—		—		24	2
Southampton	Southampton total		50	5	5	0	4	0	—		—		59	5
Career total			418	84	40	13	32	11	72	21	2	0	564	129

=== International ===
Appearances and goals by national team and year
National team	Year	Apps	Goals
England	2006	1	0
England	2007	0	0
England	2008	5	3
England	2009	2	0
England	2010	7	0
England	2011	6	0
England	2012	9	1
England	2013	6	1
England	2014	0	0
England	2015	6	3
England	2016	5	0
Total		47	8

Scores and results list England's goal tally first, score column indicates score after each Walcott goal.

List of international goals scored by Theo Walcott
No.	Date	Venue	Cap	Opponent	Score	Result	Competition	Ref.
1	10 September 2008	Stadion Maksimir, Zagreb, Croatia	4	Croatia	1–0	4–1	2010 FIFA World Cup qualification	
2	10 September 2008	Stadion Maksimir, Zagreb, Croatia	4	Croatia	2–0	4–1	2010 FIFA World Cup qualification	
3	10 September 2008	Stadion Maksimir, Zagreb, Croatia	4	Croatia	4–1	4–1	2010 FIFA World Cup qualification	
4	15 June 2012	Olimpiyskiy National Sports Complex, Kyiv, Ukraine	26	Sweden	2–2	3–2	UEFA Euro 2012	
5	14 August 2013	Wembley Stadium, London, England	34	Scotland	1–1	3–2	Friendly	
6	5 September 2015	San Marino Stadium, Serravalle, San Marino	41	San Marino	4–0	6–0	UEFA Euro 2016 qualification	
7	5 September 2015	San Marino Stadium, Serravalle, San Marino	41	San Marino	6–0	6–0	UEFA Euro 2016 qualification	
8	9 October 2015	Wembley Stadium, London, England	42	Estonia	1–0	2–0	UEFA Euro 2016 qualification	

== Honours ==
Southampton

- FA Youth Cup runner-up: 2004–05

Arsenal

- FA Cup: 2014–15, 2016–17
- FA Community Shield: 2015, 2017
- Football League Cup runner-up: 2006–07

England U21

- UEFA European Under-21 Championship runner-up: 2009

Individual

- BBC Young Sports Personality of the Year: 2006
- BBC London Young Footballer of the Year: 2008
