= Tidmarsh =

Coordinates: 51°28′01″N 1°05′13″W

- Village and civil parish
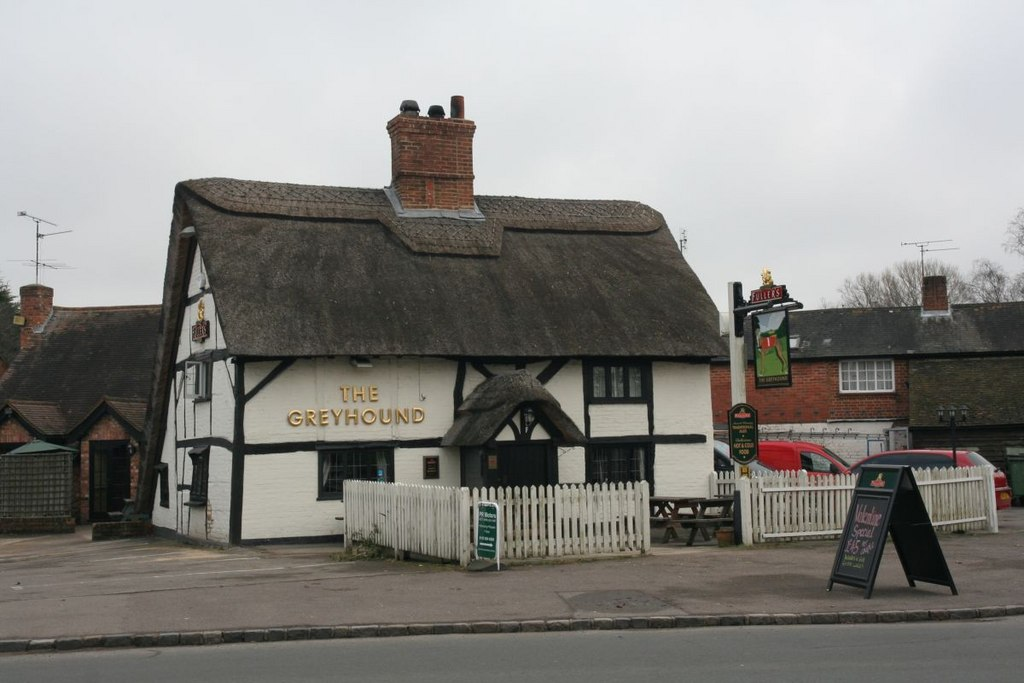
- The 13th century Greyhound pub

- Location within Berkshire
- Area: 7.02 km^{2} (2.71 sq mi)
- Population: 501 (2011 census including Sulham)
  - Density: 71/km^{2} (180/sq mi)
- OS grid reference: SU6374
- Civil parish: Tidmarsh
- Unitary authority: West Berkshire
- Ceremonial county: Berkshire
- Region: South East
- Country: England
- Sovereign state: United Kingdom
- Post town: READING
- Postcode district: RG8
- Dialling code: 0118
- Police: Thames Valley
- Fire: Royal Berkshire
- Ambulance: South Central
- UK Parliament: Reading West and Mid Berkshire

Tidmarsh is a village and civil parish in the West Berkshire district, in the ceremonial county of Berkshire, England. Its development is mainly residential and agricultural, and is centred on the A340 road between Pangbourne and Theale. The rural area is bounded by the M4 motorway to the south. It is centred 1.5 miles (2.4 km) south of Pangbourne, 5.5 miles (8.9 km) west of Reading and 40 miles (64 km) west of London. Tidmarsh shares a grouped parish council with the neighbouring parish of Sulham. In 2021 the parish had a population of 414.

== Geography ==
Its elevation ranges between 42 m (138 ft) in the north-east, and 85 m (279 ft) AOD in the western projection. The vast majority of the parish (more than 90%) is at more than 5 m (16 ft) above the River Pang. Much of the main street is between 1–10 m (3 ft 3 in – 32 ft 10 in) above the river level.

Woodland covers less than a tenth of its total area but about a quarter of the western or south-western higher ground. The Pang flows north through the village and then through the Moor Copse Nature Reserve on its way to join the River Thames at Pangbourne. In December 2006 the reserve was doubled in size, to about 57 hectares (140 acres). The Tidmarsh and Sulham circular walk, about 4.0 km (2.5 miles) long, passes through the reserve and both villages.

== History ==
The Tidmarsh section of the A340 is thought to follow the Roman road from the Roman town of Calleva Atrebatum in Silchester (about 7 mi or 11 km south), either to Dorchester-on-Thames (about 10 mi or 16 km north) or a river-crossing at Pangbourne. If so, however, the southern portion has been straightened in later years. The earliest mention of Tidmarsh was in 1196. In 1239 there was a land-ownership dispute concerning the manor. There are records of a water corn-mill and a fishery in Tidmarsh in 1305. The 18th century successor to the mill is now Grade II listed and converted to domestic accommodation. There are multiple World War II pillboxes surrounding Tidmarsh, which made up part of the GHQ Line.

== Notable buildings ==
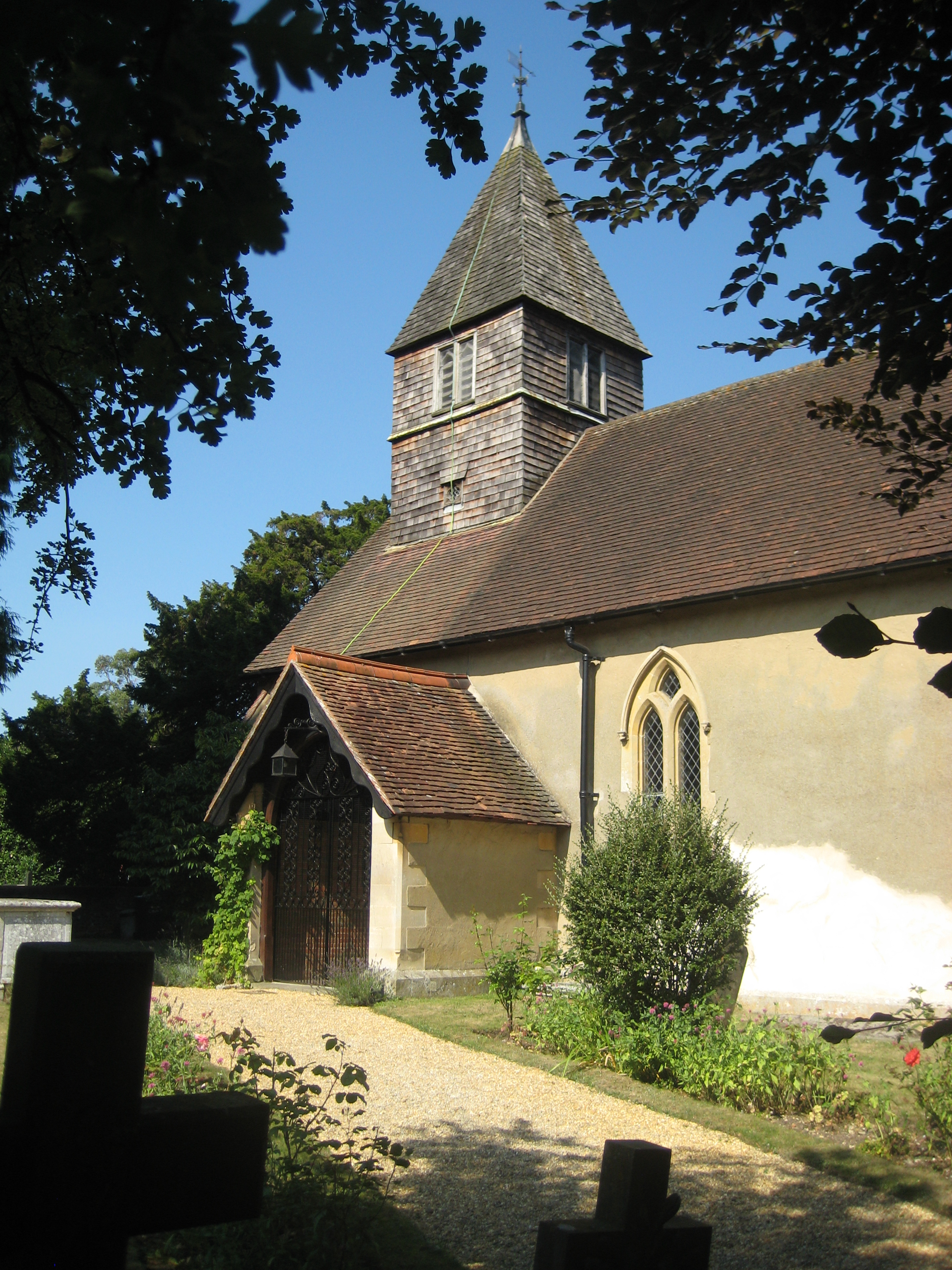
St Laurence's Church

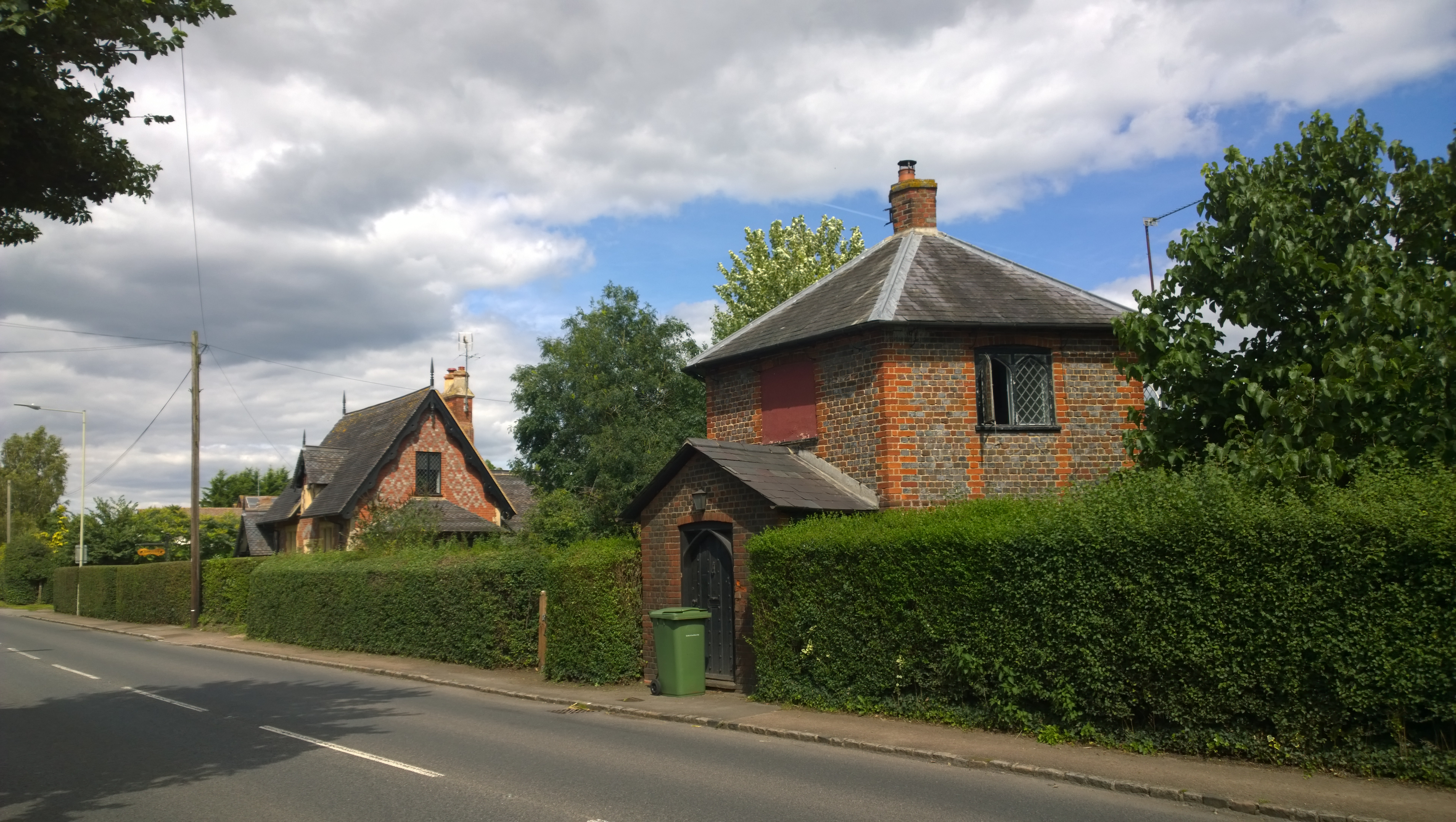
The Round House

The most conspicuous listed building in Tidmarsh is the 13th century half-timbered Greyhound Pub, which suffered a serious fire in 2005.

Another historic building is the Grade I listed, 12th century church, which is dedicated to St Laurence. The church is particularly notable for its Norman south doorway, "very rare 13th century polygonal apse" and 13th century lancet windows. The church was restored and modified in the 19th century. The old rectory dates from 1856.

Other notable buildings include the Grade II listed Round House and Mill House.

== Governance ==
There are two tiers of local government covering Tidmarsh, at parish and unitary authority level: Tidmarsh with Sulham Parish Council and West Berkshire Council. The parish council is a grouped parish council, also covering the neighbouring parish of Sulham. Parish council meetings are generally held at Tidmarsh Village Hall.

== Demography ==
2011 Published Statistics: Population, home ownership and extracts from Physical Environment, surveyed in 2005
| Output area | Homes owned outright | Owned with a loan | Socially rented | Privately rented | Other | km^{2} roads | km^{2} water | km^{2} domestic gardens | Usual residents | km^{2} |
|---|---|---|---|---|---|---|---|---|---|---|
| Civil parish | 83 | 81 | 2 | 35 | 5 | 0.130 | 0.071 | 0.171 | 501 | 7.02 |

== Notable people ==
Notable residents include author Lytton Strachey (1880–1932) and painter Dora Carrington (1893–1932), who lived in the Mill House between 1917 and 1924, and mathematician John Pollard (born 1941). Carrington painted the Greyhound Pub sign in the village. Rex Partridge, renamed Ralph by the Bloomsbury set, also settled at Tidmarsh and formed a very 'Bloomsbury' trio with Lytton and Dora.
