= River Pang =

River in Berkshire, England

Coordinates: 51.486°N 1.088°W

Pang
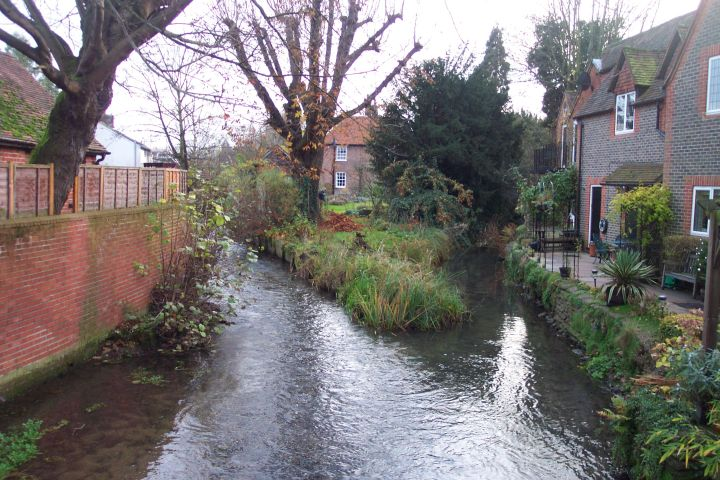
- River Pang in Pangbourne

Location
- Country: England
- Counties: Berkshire
- Villages: Farnborough, East Ilsley, Compton, Hampstead Norreys, Frilsham, Bucklebury, Stanford Dingley, Bradfield, Tidmarsh, Pangbourne

Physical characteristics
- Source
  - location: Varies between Farnborough, Compton and Hampstead Norreys
- Mouth: River Thames
  - location: Pangbourne
- Length: 23 km (14 mi)
- Discharge
  - location: Pangbourne
  - average: 0.62 m^{3}/s (22 cu ft/s)
  - minimum: 0.07 m^{3}/s (2.5 cu ft/s)24 August 1976
  - maximum: 6.50 m^{3}/s (230 cu ft/s)22 November 1974
- Discharge
  - location: Frilsham
  - average: 0.21 m^{3}/s (7.4 cu ft/s)

Basin features
- Tributaries
  - left: Maidenhatch Brook
  - right: River Bourne

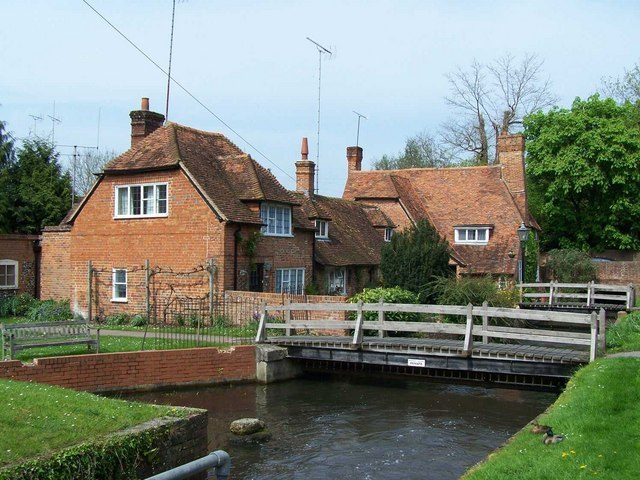
The River Pang in Bradfield

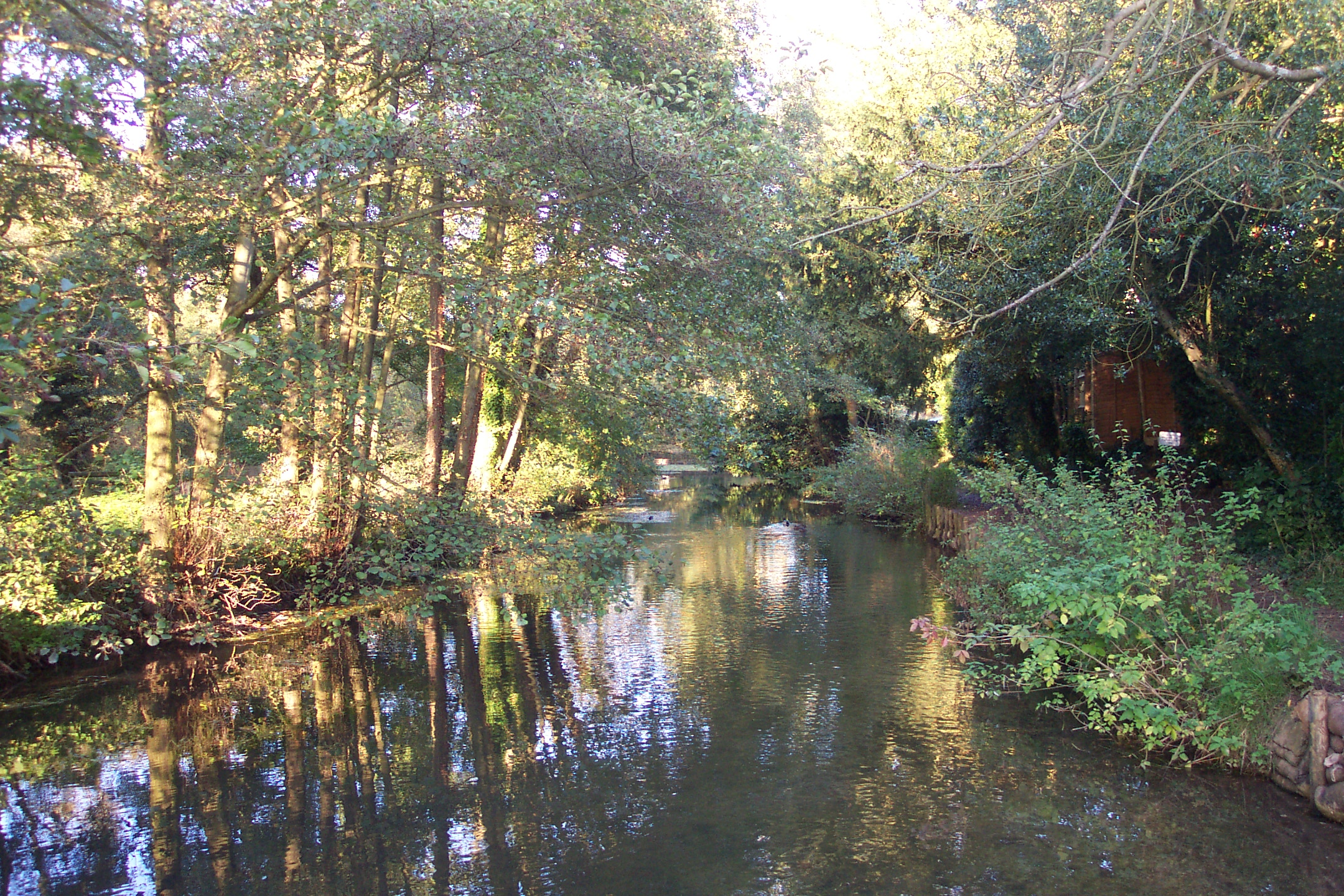
The River Pang near Bradfield College, and just upstream of the previous picture

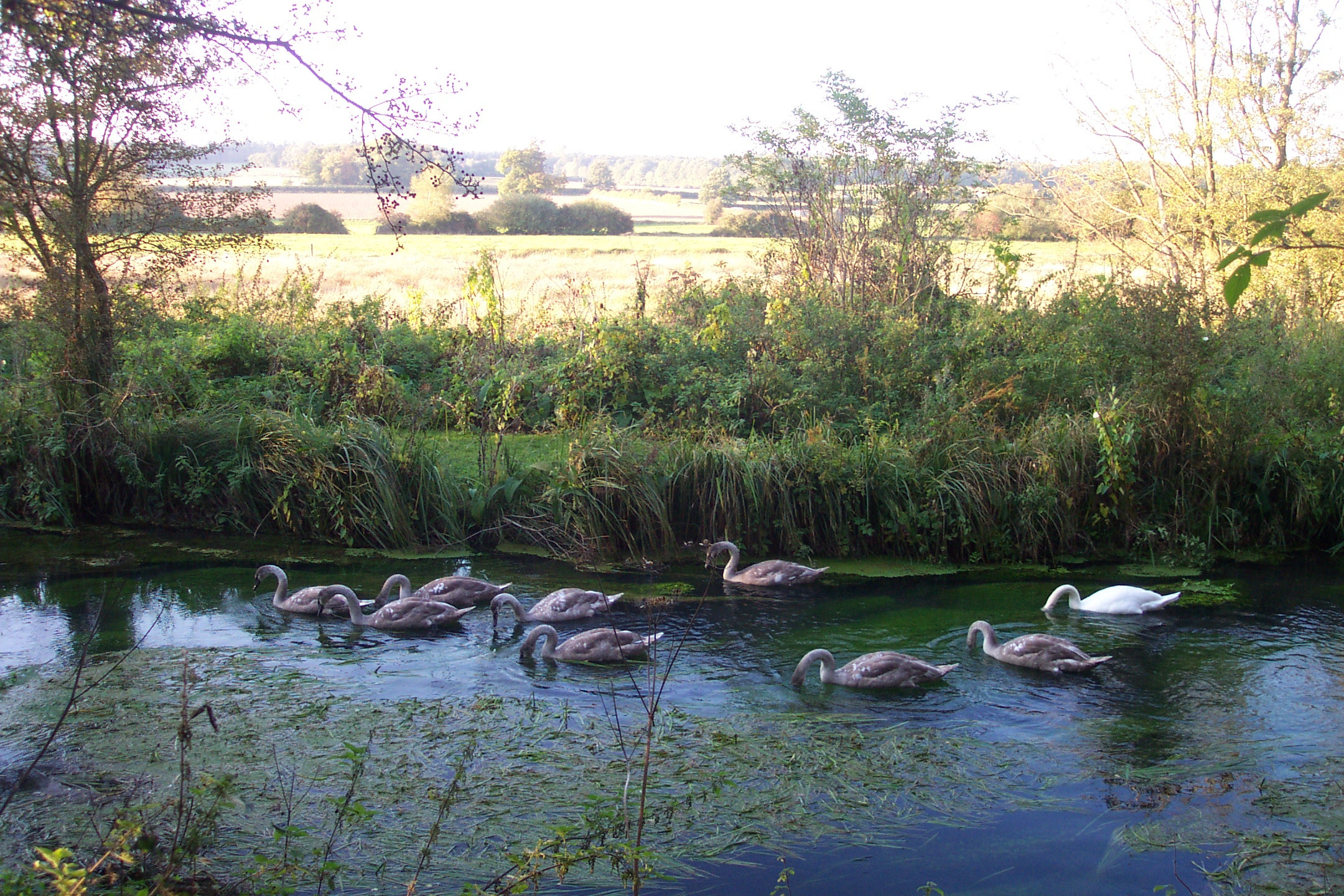
A family of mute swans on the River Pang

The River Pang is a small chalk stream river in the west of the English county of Berkshire, and a tributary of the River Thames. It runs for approximately 23 kilometres (14 mi) from its source near the village of Compton to its confluence with the Thames in the village of Pangbourne.

The river, and its water voles, are thought to have inspired author Kenneth Grahame's character Ratty and his book The Wind in the Willows.

== Course ==
The river's source is normally near the village of Compton, although the exact location varies depending on rainfall levels. In times of high rainfall it can be traced back to Farnborough, some four miles to the west-north-west, whilst at other times it may be as far downstream as the outfall from Hampstead Norreys sewage works.

From Compton, the Pang flows south through the villages of Hampstead Norreys and Frilsham, before turning east to flow through the villages of Bucklebury, Stanford Dingley and Bradfield.

To the east of Bradfield the Pang is joined by the River Bourne and turns north to flow through the villages of Tidmarsh and Pangbourne, eventually entering the Thames between Whitchurch Lock and Whitchurch Bridge.

The valley of the River Pang between Compton and Bradfield is rather isolated, penetrated only by narrow country lanes. Because of this isolation, the valley has not become the residential commuter area that is much of Berkshire, and is still largely agricultural.

== Wildlife ==
The Pang contains American signal crayfish, which have displaced the native white-clawed crayfish species.

The Berks, Bucks and Oxon Wildlife Trust owns a nature reserve straddling the Pang at Moor Copse, close to the village of Tidmarsh. A 29 ha (72-acre) extension to the nature reserve, in the area that is believed to have inspired Kenneth Grahame's work, was purchased in December 2006.

In August 2007 a coalition of the WWF, the National Trust, the RSPB and others called on the British government to adopt their Blueprint for Water. To publicize their campaign they highlighted the dangers to sites well known through literature such as The Lake District (Arthur Ransome's Swallows and Amazons and Beatrix Potter's Mrs Tiggy-Winkle), the North Kent Marshes (Charles Dickens's Great Expectations) and the River Pang.

== Water quality ==
The Environment Agency measures the water quality of the river systems in England. Each is given an overall ecological status, which may be one of five levels: high, good, moderate, poor and bad. There are several components that are used to determine this, including biological status, which looks at the quantity and varieties of invertebrates, angiosperms and fish, and chemical status, which compares the concentrations of various chemicals against known safe concentrations. Chemical status is rated good or fail.

Water quality of the River Pang in 2019:

Section	Ecological Status	Chemical Status	Overall Status	Length	Catchment	Channel
Pang	Moderate	Fail	Moderate	36.57 km (22.72 mi)	170.531 km^{2} (65.842 sq mi)	

== Etymology ==
The river is named after a man, thought to be an early Saxon chieftain, or tribe called Pǣga who lived there in the post-Roman era.

== See also ==
- Tributaries of the River Thames
- List of rivers in England

Next confluence upstream	River Thames	Next confluence downstream
River Thame (north)	River Pang	River Kennet (south)
