= Fords Farm =

Suburb of Reading, Berkshire, England

Coordinates: 51.440473°N 1.025119°W

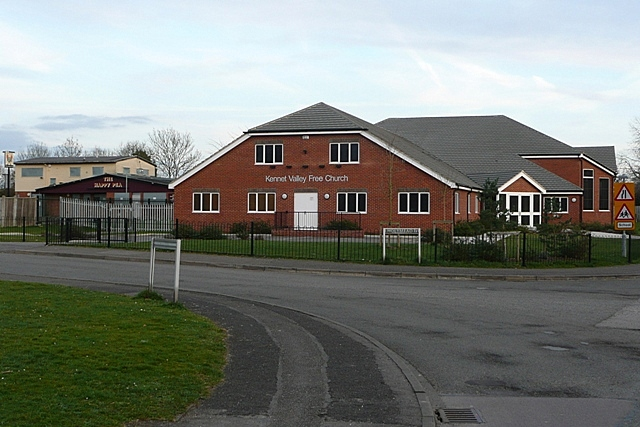
- Pub and church in Fords Farm

- Location within Berkshire
- OS grid reference: SU678717
- Unitary authority: West Berkshire
- Ceremonial county: Berkshire
- Region: South East
- Country: England
- Sovereign state: United Kingdom
- Post town: Reading
- Postcode district: RG31
- Dialling code: 0118
- Police: Thames Valley
- Fire: Royal Berkshire
- Ambulance: South Central
- UK Parliament: Reading West

Fords Farm in West Berkshire is a suburb of Reading in the English county of Berkshire.

== Location ==
Fords Farm is a housing estate between Beansheaf Farm and Calcot Place at Calcot in the civil parish of Holybrook in West Berkshire. It is close to the border with the town and borough of Reading. Fords Farm lies south of the Bath Road.

== History ==
From 1894, Fords Farm was in the civil parish of Theale. Before that it was in the parish of Tilehurst. The historic Calcot Mill is on the Holy Brook at Fords Farm in an area previously known as Calcot Green.
