= Theale =

Coordinates: 51°26′13″N 1°04′37″W

- Village and civil parish
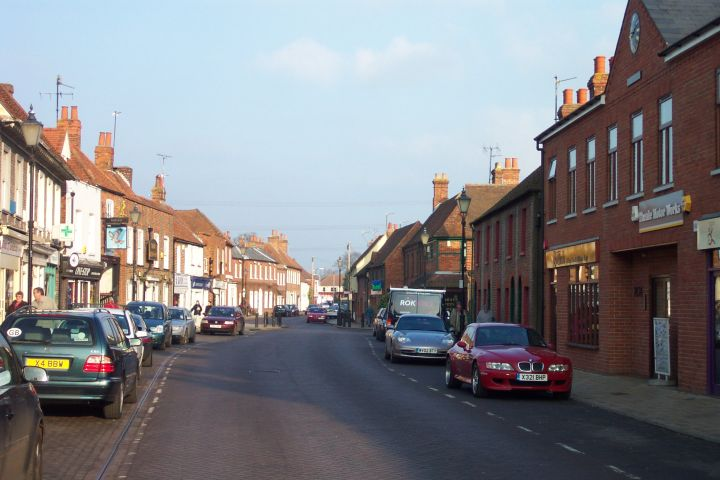
- Theale High Street

- Location within Berkshire
- Area: 3.64 sq mi (9.4 km^{2})
- Population: 2,835 (2011 census)
  - Density: 779/sq mi (301/km^{2})
- OS grid reference: SU641713
- Civil parish: Theale
- Unitary authority: West Berkshire
- Ceremonial county: Berkshire
- Region: South East
- Country: England
- Sovereign state: United Kingdom
- Post town: Reading
- Postcode district: RG7
- Dialling code: 0118
- Police: Thames Valley
- Fire: Royal Berkshire
- Ambulance: South Central
- UK Parliament: Reading West and Mid Berkshire
- Website: Theale Parish Council

Theale (/ˈθiːəl, ˈθiːl/) is a village and civil parish in West Berkshire, England. It is 5 miles (8 km) southwest of Reading and 10 miles (16 km) east of Thatcham. The compact parish is bounded to the south and south-east by the Kennet & Avon Canal (which here incorporates the River Kennet), to the north by a golf course, to the east by the M4 motorway and to the west by the A340 road.

== Toponymy ==
The name is thought to come from the Old English þelu meaning planks. As with the village of Theale in Somerset, this probably refers to planks used to create causeways on marshes or flood plains. A local legend suggests the name Theale refers to the village's coaching inns, and its position as the first staging post on the Bath Road out of Reading – literally calling the village The ale.

== History ==
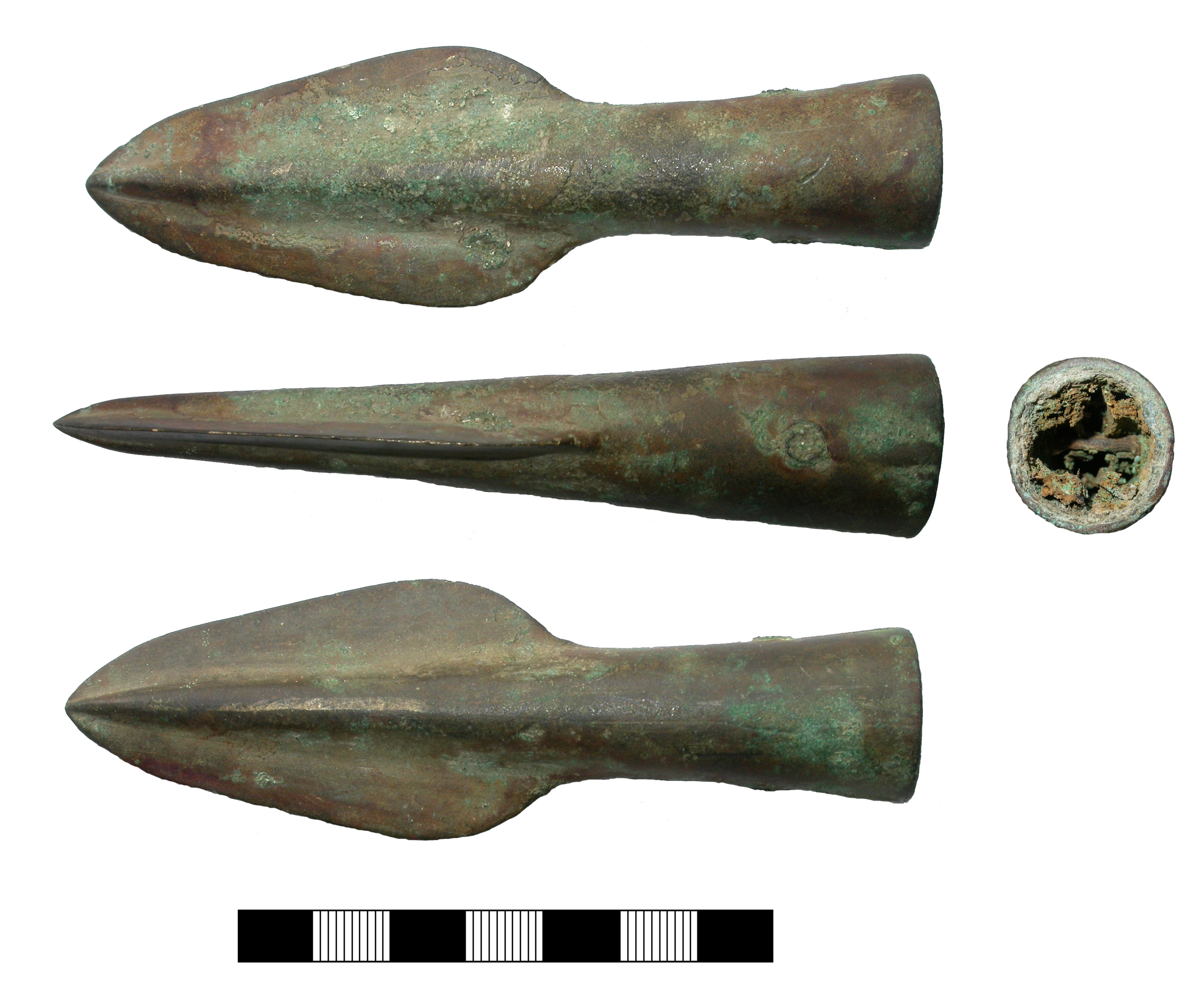
Bronze Age spearhead, found in Theale in 2000, dated to c. 1200 – c. 750 BCE

=== Romans ===
The old significance of the position of Theale is that it lay at the junction of two ancient natural routes, one following the Kennet Valley from east to west and another which exploited the valley of the River Pang to run at a low level through the Chiltern Hills from north to south via the Goring Gap. This latter route was taken by a Roman road which ran from Calleva Atrebatum (modern Silchester) north to Dorchester on Thames. Extrapolation of the known alignment from Silchester to near Ufton Nervet indicates a crossing point of the River Kennet just east of Tylemill Bridge. This Roman road has its equivalent in the modern A340 from Theale to Pangbourne.

Roman remains were uncovered during the excavation of the Theale Old Gravel Pit, at the end of St Ives Close, for ten years after 1887. The Kennet Valley route, later the Bath Road, only became important after the foundation of the Anglo-Saxon borough of Reading in the 8th century. The Anglo-Saxons had abandoned Calleva Atrebatum, but the north to south route remained important to them as connecting the royal capital of Winchester with the boroughs of Old Basing near Basingstoke and Wallingford.

=== Middle Ages ===
From the early Middle Ages to the 19th century, Theale was mostly part of Tilehurst parish. The old parish boundaries around here were complicated, and the village was a chapelry, comprising a western outlier of this large and irregularly shaped parish. The odd parish boundaries by the river indicates that the valley bottom had been converted from swamp forest to flood-meadows or reed-beds for thatching by the start of the second millennium. The portion belonging to Englefield lay between the main river (now the canal) and a branch, called Holy Brook, which left the main course at Sheffield Mill and rejoined it at Reading Abbey. The name was allegedly because the abbey used the brook to power its corn mill and flush its toilets, and so engineered its course to ensure a good head of water.

From before 1241 until the 1800s, Theale, unusually, gave its name to the hundred containing the parishes of Aldermaston, Bradfield, Burghfield, Englefield, Padworth, Purley, Stratfield Mortimer, Sulham, Sulhamstead Bannister, Tidmarsh, Ufton Nervet and Woolhampton. The oddity of this was that the village was not in the hundred, because Tilehurst parish was in the Hundred of Reading. The manor and church of Tilehurst belonged to Reading Abbey in the Middle Ages. However, the chapel at Theale did not but was part of land-holdings in Theale held by the nunnery of Goring Priory by 1291. The nuns also held the neighbouring manor of Sulham, but the chapel had some connection with the church at Englefield.

There is circumstantial evidence of a readjustment of boundaries between Sulham, Englefield and Tilehurst parishes and the possible transfer of Theale in the earlier Middle Ages. In the later Middle Ages, the abbey leased out many of its properties to ensure a cash income at a time when the economy was becoming increasingly cash-driven. The large manor of Tilehurst was subdivided, and a "manor", not actually legally functioning as one, called Beansheaf was in existence by 1390. This was named after a family farming land in the parish in the 13th century. The territory included Theale, but the manor-house was to the east of the present village and the site is now east of the M4, at the north end of Bourne Close. A housing estate in Holybrook parish preserves the name.

=== Civil War ===
Theale saw action in the English Civil War, (1642–51). On 22 September 1643, soon after the First Battle of Newbury, the village was the site of a skirmish between Prince Rupert's Royalist forces and the Earl of Essex's Parliamentarians. Rupert attacked the Earl's forces from the rear as they were returning to London. According to contemporary reports, the Earl's forces – led by Colonel Middleton – held strong; up to 800 Royalist musketeers and 60 horses were killed, and at least eight Parliamentarian units, a minimum of 800 men, were also killed, and were buried on the spot in Deadman's Lane. The Royalist forces retreated, and the Earl left Theale on the morning of 23 September, heading to Reading where his forces recovered from fatigue. Thomas Fairfax marched through Theale on 1 May 1645, en route from Windsor to Salisbury. Evidence for the encounter came to light in 1878, when a sword with the remains of an iron hilt was found near Deadman's Lane. A housing estate in the south-west quadrant of the village has the street names Cavalier Close and Roundhead Road in memory of this skirmish.

=== Road transport ===
Stagecoaches began to run through from London to Bath and Bristol in the mid-17th century, soon after the civil war ended. In 1667, the first through coach was advertised as The Flying Machine in an advertising poster:

All those desirous to pass from London to Bath, or any other place on their Road, let them repair to the Bell Savage Inn on Ludgate Hill in London and the White Lion Inn at Bath, at both which places they may be received in a Stage Coach every Monday, Wednesday, and Friday, which performs the whole journey in Three Days (if God permit), and sets forth at five in the morning. Passengers to pay One Pound five Shillings each.

In response to increased traffic, the first section of the Bath Road, between Reading and Theale, was made into a turnpike by Act of Parliament in 1714. The rest of the road from London to Bristol was to follow in the next four decades, leading to a golden age of coach travel.

As the Bath Road thus became an established trade route and turnpike between the south-west and south-east of England, Theale became a staging post and as such was known for its numerous coaching inns. A stage was the distance a coach would run before changing horses, and the staging post was where the horses were rested and refreshed before doing the stage again in the opposite direction. A stage was usually seven to fifteen miles long, depending on topography, so Reading to Theale, at five miles, was a short stage and would have taken an hour. The 18th century highwayman, Dick Turpin, is said to have hidden in a secret room in The Old Lamb inn on Church Street on numerous occasions. In 1802, topographer James Baker chronicled the village, en route from Reading to Newbury, and described it as "inconsiderable". However, the wealth engendered by a continued growth in road traffic meant that the village entered its most prosperous era, expanding substantially in the earlier 19th century before the arrival of the railway. The growth of the village led to the creation of a separate ecclesiastical parish and the consecration of a new church in 1832.

The road came back to life with the invention of the motor car, and the new status of the Bath Road as London's highway to Bristol was demonstrated on 23 April 1900, when the Automobile Club held a motor car reliability demonstration involving a cavalcade from London to Calcot Park, the home of Alfred Harmsworth who sponsored the event. Calcot Park was then just north of Theale parish. For the next seventy years, all the motor traffic between London, Reading and Bristol passed along Theale High Street. The development response was slow, however, and only two small housing estates were developed in the inter-war period. The first was Lambfields west of the church, and the second comprised Blossom Avenue and The Crescent in the north. Lambfields was named after the Old Lamb inn.

=== Canal ===
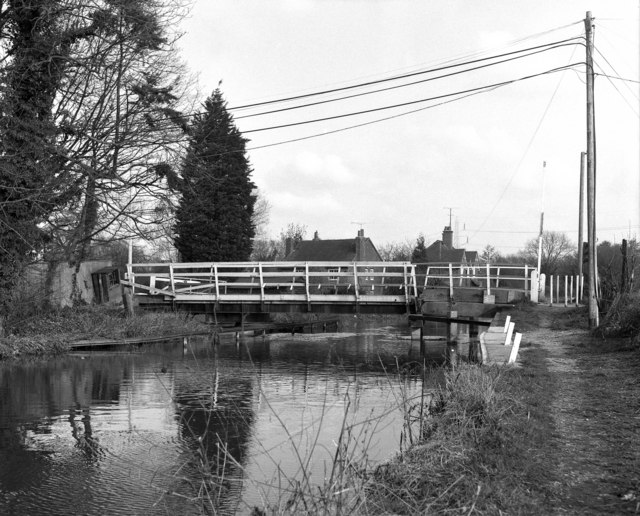
Sheffield Swing Bridge in 1976.

The Kennet Navigation opened in 1723 from Reading to Newbury. The Kennet and Avon Canal, extending from Newbury to Bath, was opened in 1810. Theale had its wharf at a location called Sheffield, in Burghfield parish and next to Sheffield Lock. Here, the road to Burghfield village crosses the canal by a single-lane swing bridge, now controlled by traffic lights. The canal was locally re-opened from the Thames at Reading to Hungerford wharf in July 1974. However, full restoration of the entire length to Bath was only completed in 2004. In 1983, West Berkshire Council declared the Sheffield Bridge Conservation Area to protect the swing bridge, Sheffield Lock and Sheffield Mill. In 2000, the canal towpath became part of National Cycle Route 4. It has the legal status of a cruiseway, a waterway devoted to recreational boat traffic, since 2011.

=== Railway ===
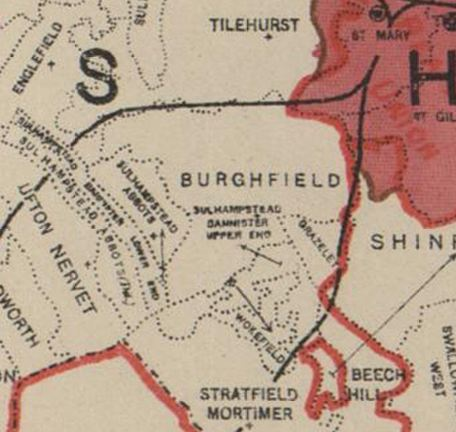
Ordnance survey map of 1888 shows the railway line and split between southern Tilehurst (most of Theale) and Burghfield

On 21 December 1847, the Great Western Railway opened Theale railway station on the northern branch of the Berks and Hants Railway, from Reading to Hungerford. This immediately halted the coach traffic and the turnpike road company's income, and crippled the canal company which had to slash rates and be henceforth content with limited local traffic. The canal sold out to the railway in 1852, which maintained it in operation until 1951. Then, a collapsed aqueduct closed it as a through route, although it was never formally abandoned. The railway line was extended to Devizes in 1864, and became part of a new direct GWR main line to Devon and Cornwall in 1906. Theale would have been one of the towns and villages dependent on the coaching trade, for which the arrival of a railway was a disaster. This is shown by successive editions of the Ordnance Survey, which show that the village entered stasis and did not grow until the 20th century.

From 1847 to the early years of the 20th century, the village had to make do economically with local farming, a brewery and gravel extraction. The last named was, however, greatly facilitated by the railway and a large pit near the village, Theale Old Gravel Pit, opened in 1887 with its own railway siding. The 1898 Ordnance Survey map also shows a small gasworks next to the station, and a ropewalk off Station Road near its junction with the High Street. There is evidence that local farmers were growing hemp to make into rope. The railway to Devizes was closed in 1963, and Theale lost its local service to that town.

=== Airfield ===
RAF Theale is a former Second World War RAF training facility located on Sheffield Farm, just east of the canal swing bridge, and actually in Burghfield parish. It was opened in 1944, with two grass runways, and used for training by No. 26 Elementary Flying Training School, and, later in the same year, by No. 128 Gliding School. The training school used twenty-four de Havilland Tiger Moths. The canal by the airfield was fortified with pillboxes, one of which is a listed building.

=== Motorway ===
After the opening of the railway, the next major change for the village was the opening of the M4 motorway on 22 December 1971. The High Street went from having an enormous amount of traffic passing through, to none. Junction 12 on the motorway was built just east of the village. The old road was cut and a footbridge was provided. A new dual carriageway bypass was built from the junction, running south of the village to the A340. A short link road, Hoad Way, was provided from this to the east end of the High Street. The new transport link led to major development in the village. The area between the bypass and railway was zoned for industrial and warehouse development. Two substantial new housing estates were added to the village, Woodfield Way in the north-east and Meadow Way in the south-west. The narrow strip of land between the High Street and the bypass was infilled with blocks of flats. As a precautionary preservation measure, in 1971, the Rural District Council declared three conservation areas: Theale High Street/Blossom Lane, Holy Trinity, Theale and The Lamb, Theale. In 1984, after it was realised that several of the buildings in the High Street were 17th century, a total of 32 buildings in the parish were given listed building status. All are Grade II, except the church, which is Grade I, and Garston Lock, Grade II*.

== Governance ==
Until 1894, Theale was a chapelry and tithing territory in the parish of Tilehurst. Then, Theale civil parish was created. The new parish was included in Bradfield Rural District Council. However, in 1974 the rural district became part of Newbury District Council which, in turn became the unitary authority of West Berkshire.

== Geography ==
=== Topography ===
The landscape of the present parish is relatively flat, with expanses of level ground flanking the main road. It is dominated by the built-up area of the village. This is residential north of the bypass, and commercial south of it. To the north of the village there is a golf course, and to the west are a few large fields owned by the Englefield Estate. There were many wooded areas within the old parish before 2000, but these have been annexed by neighbouring parishes and the only named wood left is a tiny fragment in the south-east corner of the golf course next to the M4 called Further Clayhill Copse. The River Kennet runs south of the village, and is joined by the Kennet & Avon Canal with two sets of locks and weirs (Garston and Sheffield Locks).

It used to cut through meadows occupying a wide flood plain, but these were dug out in the 20th century for gravel extraction and so replaced by a mosaic of lakes. The south-east and south boundary of the parish is now the canal. Just the other side, in Burghfield and Sulhamstead parishes, one of these lakes is now a Local nature reserve called Hosehill Lake. Theale village has one lake within its residential built-up area to the far west, with privately owned houses flanking it on its north side but recreational walking possible to the south. Two further such lakes are in a business park in the extreme south-east corner of the parish.

=== Geology ===
As with other parts of the Kennet Valley, soil in Theale is a variety of chalk, flint, gravel, clay, alluvium and loam. The village is on a broad gravel terrace, the gravel deriving from flints weathered out of the bedrock of chalk. The chalk outcrops in the hills to the north, with pockets of clay. The river flood plain is covered with alluvium, over beds of more gravel. The loam occurs where chalk and clay have weathered together. There have been narrow peat marshes along the river, marking the locations of former oxbow lakes. Samples of ochra purpurco-rubra, a purple-red type of ochre used by painters, have been found in clay pits in the village. This is a form of haematite iron ore.

=== Layout and fabric ===
Theale before the 20th century was an early example of ribbon development, in that the built-up area was a long strip along the Bath Road with no side streets. The layout focuses on the crossroads formed by the High Street (east), Church Street (west), Blossom Lane (north) and Station Road (south). The High Street is completely built up with mainly Victorian edifices in red brick, some in patterned brickwork and some rendered in lime plaster. It is a conservation area. Listed buildings earlier in date are 1, 4, 29, 31, 33, 35, 37, 43–5, 47, 48, 49, 50, 52, 58, 60. Of these, seventeenth-century timber framed buildings are 29, 33, 35 and 52; the others are Georgian or Regency. 29, 31 and 47 are old coaching inns (31 still open as The Falcon). 49 has an unusual Gothic door-case.

Before the 20th century, Church Street was not completely built up but had clusters of buildings separated by paddocks. The village ended at the hamlet of Theale Green. Englefield Road branches north-westwards before the church, leading to the health centre, the Roman Catholic church and the Englefied Estate office at the junction with Deadman's Lane. The church, churchyard wall, churchyard gate, the Old Rectory, the Old Rectory Cottage (former coach house) and the Webb Tomb in the churchyard are all listed buildings. The church is the focus of its own conservation area.

Church Street continues beyond the church to the Theale Church of England Primary School, the library, Theale Green School and the St John Ambulance Centre. Listed buildings] are 1–3, 2, 18-20 27, 29 and 49. No 2 is the Crown Inn, a heavily altered 17th-century coaching inn formerly with a coach horse paddock opposite, where a car dealer now is. 18-20 is the Old Lamb, a former coaching inn which is now a hotel. It is the only thatched building in Theale, and is a 17th-century timber-framed edifice abutted by a large early 19th-century annexe. Dick Turpin stayed here and there is allegedly a ghost, but Historic England rejects the date of 1487 painted on the façade. The Old Lamb is easily confused with the Lamb next door at number 22, a pub in polychrome brickwork which closed down in 2012. The Old Lamb has its own conservation area, which includes a small housing estate called Lambfields. This was built in the 1920s, the first in the village, and features high-quality tile-hung semi-detached houses in a vernacular style.

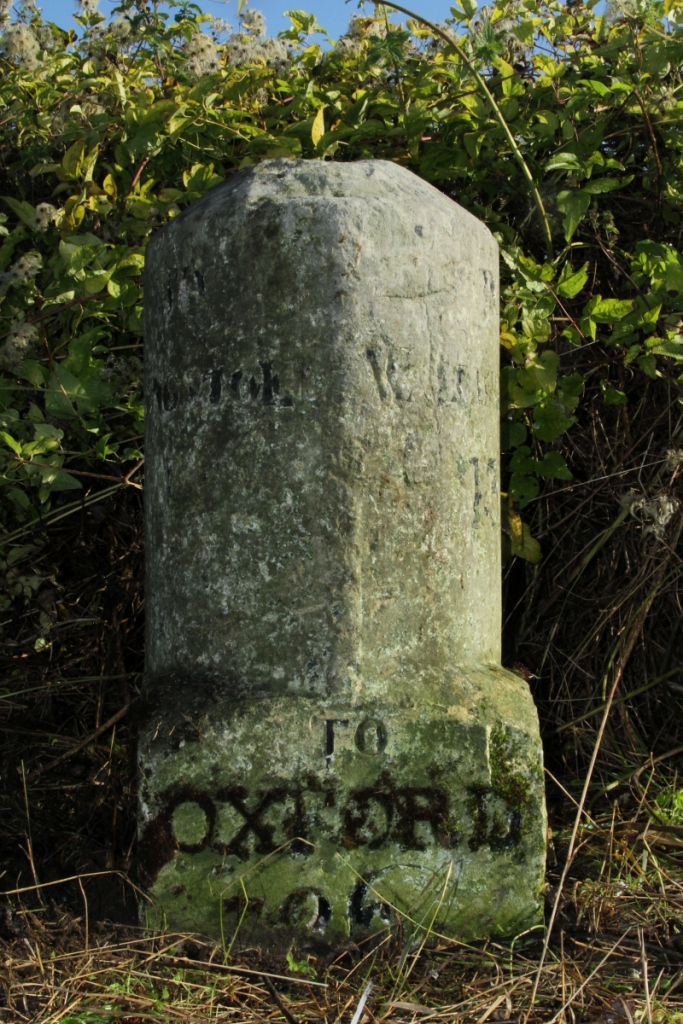
Theale's smallest listed building

Before the 20th century, Blossoms Lane ran to a hamlet called Blossoms End and ended at Blossomsend Farm, now a golf course. The road is now Crown Lane, leading to Blossom Lane. The High Street conservation area includes Crown Lane and lower Blossom Lane, protecting Victorian houses with polychrome brickwork. Station Road leads through the industrial and commercial area, under the 1971 bypass bridge to the railway station, then on to the swing bridge over the canal at the Sheffield Bridge conservation area. This contains Sheffield Mill, Sheffield Lock and a pillbox, all listed. This lock has unusual scalloped walls. Garston Lock, to the east is Grade II* listed because it is a very rare turf-sided lock. The parish boundary is at the bridge, although the Fox and Hounds pub at Sheffield Bottom further on has a Theale postal address. The smallest listed building in Theale is on the A340 just south of the Bradfield Road crossroads. It is an 18th-century milestone in the form of a short column, reading "TO BASINGSTOKE 15; TO WALLINGFORD 13; TO OXFORD 26".

== Economy ==
=== Pubs ===
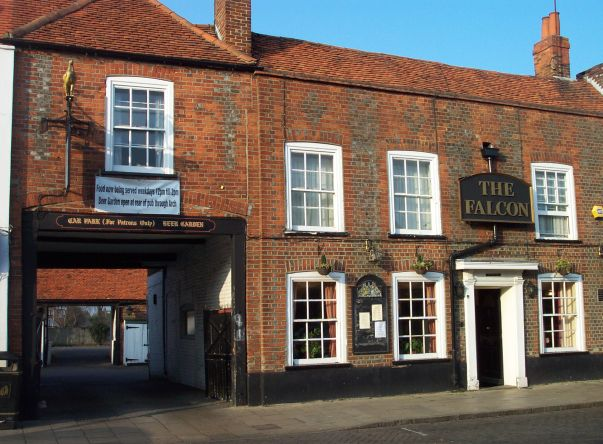
The Falcon, a 16th-century coaching inn behind an 18th-century frontage.

Theale has long been associated with pubs and the brewing trade. Many coaching inns were established on the Bath Road, though by the 1840s, the success of the Great Western Railway had considerably reduced the volume of custom the inns received. In 1843, writing about the effect of the railway on local business and environment, J G Robertson hypothesised that "it is probable that, in a few months, the completion of the Great Western Railway will totally annihilate the agreeable variety, and the hanging woods of Englefield and Beenham will no longer echo back the nocturnal challenge of the mail-guard's horn".

By 1854, the village's old coaching inns had either closed down or become ordinary inns and pubs. The survivors were: the White Hart, on the eastern outskirts, at Pincents Lane, and demolished in 1969; the Bull; the Falcon; the Castle and the Crown. The Castle vanished in 1907. In 1939, only the Crown was offering accommodation. On the other hand, the village then had the Railway Arms next to the station, since demolished; the Bridge House Inn, next to the canal, now closed and, on Church Street, the Red Lion, closed 2014; the Lamb, closed 2012 and the Volunteer.

=== Blatch's Theale Brewery ===
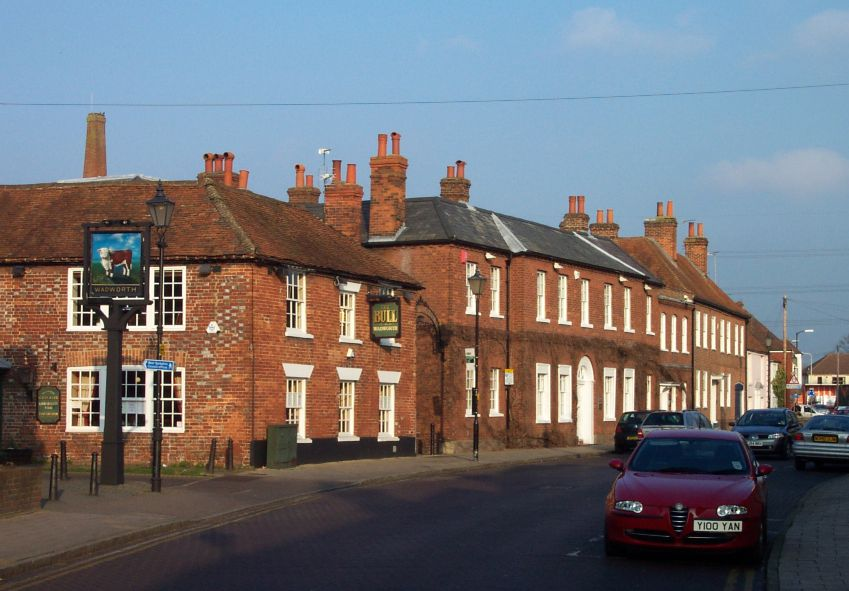
Brewery tap house and offices -brewery itself through iron archway.

The village business with the highest public profile in the later 19th and earlier 20th century was Blatch's Theale Brewery, located in premises off the High Street. The brewery began operations in 1752, and was acquired by the Blatch Brothers, William, Henry and Frank, in 1854. The family went on to create an estate of twenty-two public houses in west Berkshire and north Hampshire, including the Bull, which was the tap house. The firm sold its beer under the trademark of a stylised ear of barley. There was also a bottling plant, and bottled beers were Pale Ale, Brown Ale, "B.B.", XXXX – a barley wine and Genuine Stout. The company gave up brewing in 1959 but bought in beer from Wadworth Brewery in Devizes to sell under its own label.

This continued until the death of Harold Blatch, the last chief executive officer of the family, in 1965. His heirs immediately sold out to Allied Breweries trading as Ind Coope in 1965, and the beer brands were terminated. The brewery buildings were not sold and some survive, converted to offices, as Brewery Court. The company offices were at 43 High Street, a listed building, and the Bull tap house adjacent is now owned by Wadworth Brewery. Local competition in the village before the Second World War came from H & G Simonds Brewery of Reading which owned the Falcon and the Bridge House Inn by the canal, and from Strange's Brewery at Aldermaston Wharf, which owned the Crown and the White Hart. The street name, Blatch's Close, commemorates the firm.

=== Pincents Kiln ===
Theale was once involved in Tilehurst's tile industry; until at least the late 19th century there was a kiln to the north-east of the village. Pincents Kiln exploited the proximity of chalk to a pocket of clay to make lime cement as well as bricks and tiles. The site is now a business park to the east of the M4. Some of the buildings in the High Street have old tiled roofs.

=== Gravel ===
Gravel extraction was confined to small pits on the exposed gravel terrace of the village until the arrival of the railway. A large pit was opened in 1887 in the west of the village, with a railway spur. This pit was deep enough to flood as a lake, but subsequent work proceeding westwards down the Bath Road involved shallow stripping of the gravel above the water table. The Theale and Great Western Sand and Gravel Co was incorporated as a limited company in 1928, and was taken over by the Wraysbury Sand and Gravel Co in 1955. The rail-served Theale Aggregate Depot on Wigmore Lane remains in operation, although the material comes from other sources. The gravel under the alluvium of the river valley was massively exploited after the Second World War, with a peak of activity in the 1950s, with intensive gravel extraction along the River Kennet, which created a series of huge pits south of the railway, four miles long from south of the A340 junction to the railway to Basingstoke. These filled up with water after exhaustion, and became a series of large lakes. There is no extractive activity in the parish now.

The Old Gravel Pit in the village was already attracting the attention of birdwatchers by 1935. The flooded workings attracted much bird life, including rarities, and became nationally famous as a birdwatching destination. The Theale cluster comprised the Wigmore Lane Gravel Pits, Bottom Lane Gravel Pits, Hosehill Pit, Theale Main Pit and Arrow Head Pit. In 1988, the Theale Area Bird Conservation Group was founded, and in 1997 this took over the abandoned Hosehill Pit which became a local nature reserve under the name of Hosehill Lake. This is now under the management of the Berkshire, Buckinghamshire and Oxfordshire Wildlife Trust.

=== Theale Motor Company ===
The car showroom on the corner of Church Street and Station Road is run by Theale Motor Company, a descendant of a very early garage and car repair business. The Theale Motor and Engineering Co was established, on the former coach horse paddock of the Crown opposite, by the First World War.

=== Business Parks ===
Five business parks adjoin the railway station. Those north of the railway are, west to east: Theale Technology Centre, Theale Business Park and Arlington Business Park. South of the railway are The Markham Centre (west) and Kennet Weir Business Park (east). Koch Media has its United Kingdom offices in Theale, at Arlington Business Park. Nokia UK opened its south east office in the same park in 2018.

== Transport ==
=== Railway ===
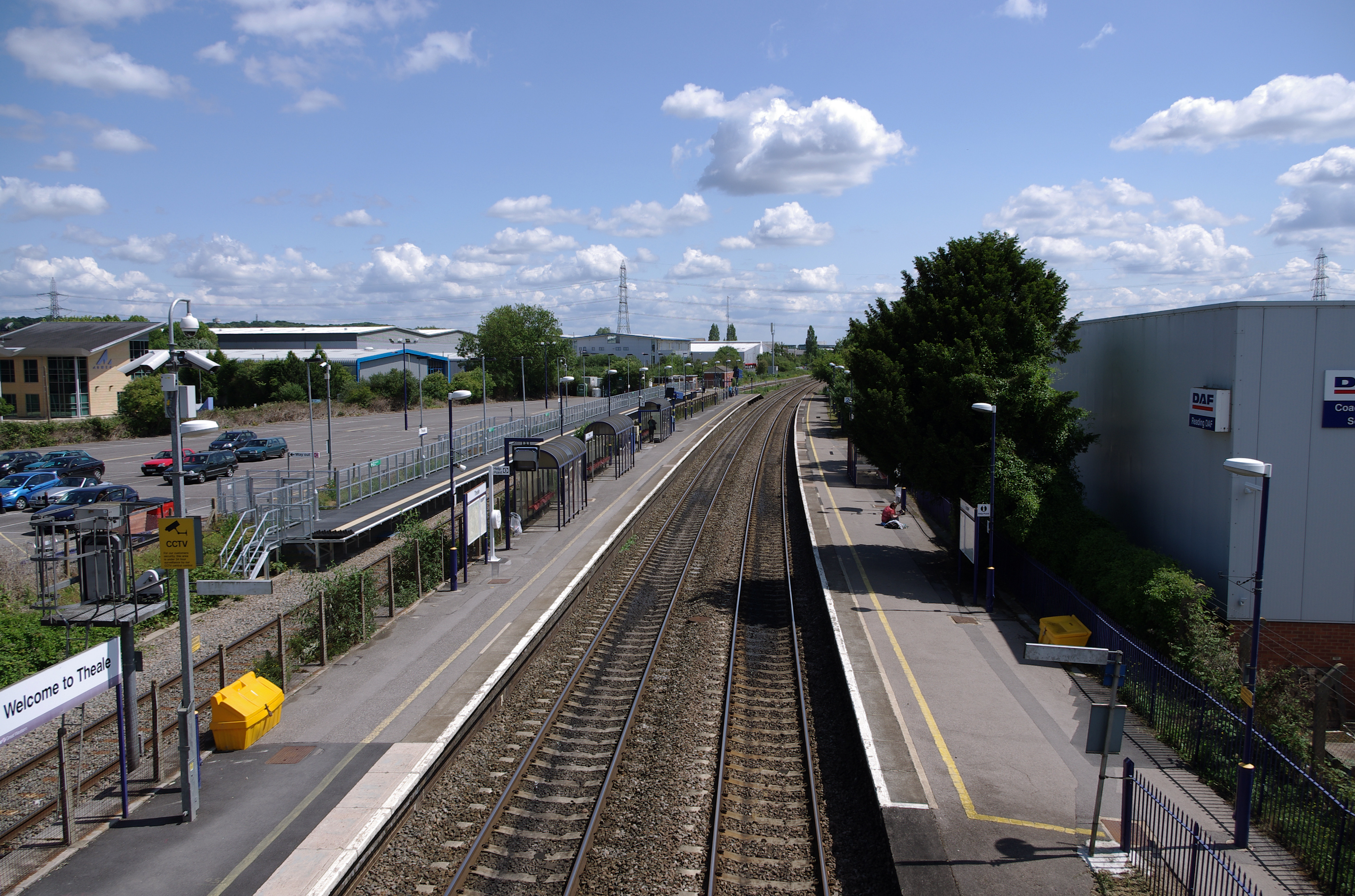
Theale Railway Station.

Theale has a railway station on the Reading to Taunton line; the station has been in operation since 1847. Until 2013, the layout consisted of two platforms, the eastbound to Reading via Southcote Junction and Reading West and the westbound to Newbury via Aldermaston, Midgham, Thatcham, and Newbury Racecourse. Some trains run past Newbury to Kintbury, Hungerford and Bedwyn. Until 1963, local services ran to Trowbridge via the so-called Devizes branch line which was closed in that year. The station had a siding for general goods (freight) services on the north side to the east of its yard, and a pub called the "Railway Arms" at the yard entrance. Aggregate traffic (sand and gravel) used a terminal to the west, and this remains open.

The pub was demolished to build Brunel Way for the Theale Business Park. In 2013, a station upgrade was begun. The goods siding was replaced by a third platform on a new loop of track, and a car park for 215 places provided. Unfortunately, the project then stalled for legal reasons after all the old buildings had been demolished, and the completion date is estimated as 2024. Meanwhile, there is no disabled access because the platforms can only be reached via stairs from the road bridge. Trains are operated by the Great Western Railway, and comprise a basic service of two trains an hour. One is a local Reading-Newbury, and one is a through London Paddington-Bedwyn.

=== Buses ===
After the opening of the M4 motorway removed all long-distance bus and coach traffic in 1971, the village's bus services consisted of a direct Reading to Newbury route, along the A4 road, and village routes between the same two towns running north and south of the main road west of Theale. These were operated by Reading Buses, the village ones being public services receiving a council subsidy. The direct route is covered by the "Jet Black" bus service, instigated by Reading Buses between Newbury and Reading along the A4 road; the journey time is about 50 minutes to Newbury and 30 to Reading, with two buses an hour being the basic service.

In 2011, Reading Buses withdrew from providing subsidised services in the Newbury area. The Newbury & District Bus Company, then owned by Weavaway Travel, took these on. Also, the Reading firm contracted Weavaway to run "Jetblack" -although without changing the bus livery. In 2018, Reading Buses took over Newbury & District Bus, and again dropped the village services. These were recast and reduced, being taken on by the West Berkshire Council Transport Services Team under the banner of Connect. The services are: 41 Newbury to Theale (Crown) via Chapel Row and Beenham, two to Theale and one from Theale daily, and 44 Thatcham to Calcot Sainsburys via Brimpton and Theale, one journey Mondays and Wednesdays. Theale has two football bus services, running when Reading Football Club are playing at home at Madejski Stadium. F20 passes through from Newbury, and F23 starts in the village to run via Pangbourne.

=== Motoring ===
Theale is just south-west of junction 12 of the M4 motorway; where the junction signs direct motorists to "Theale, Reading West". The motorway here was opened in 1971, simultaneously with a village bypass that runs south of the village. Part of the old road was suppressed for the motorway. After 1971, the name "Bath Road" was given to the bypass. The first roundabout from the motorway on this leads to the village on the right via Hoad Way, and Arlington Business Park on the left via Waterside Drive. There is a Pay and display car park off the High Street, just east of the junction with Hoad Way.

=== Canal ===
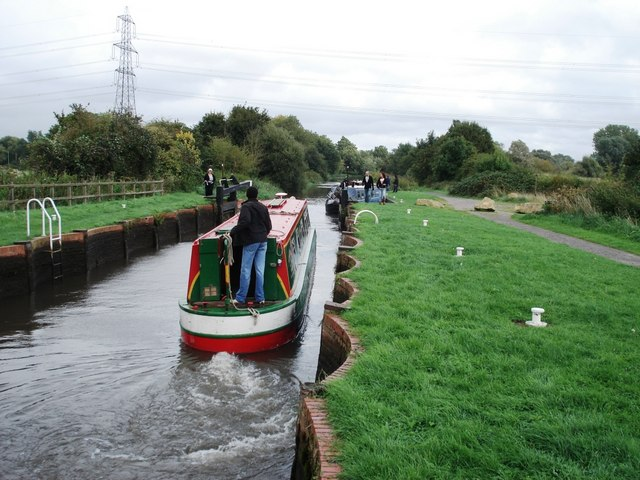
Sheffield Lock, with its scalloped walls.

The Kennet and Avon Canal is a statutory "cruiseway" for recreational boat traffic. Sheffield Bridge has a car park and picnic area, but no other facilities as the Bridge House Inn is defunct. The canal towpath is a statutory footpath, and also part of the Sustrans National Cycle Route 4 of the National Cycle Network, a long-distance cycle route from London to Fishguard in Wales. The towpath is not a statutory bridle path and has no horses.

== Education ==
The village has a Church of England primary school, founded in 1814, when the Rev. Thomas Sheppard bequeathed a trust fund generating £20 a year for a school "to learn poor children to read …and to instruct them their duty to God as taught by the church catechism, and our excellent Liturgy", as he wrote. The school had occupied the same site next to the church from 1833 but in 2018 the parish council approved plans by West Berkshire Council to build a larger school on part of the North Street playing fields. The new school opened in the summer of 2020. Theale Green Community School is a comprehensive secondary school and arts college located to the west of the village and has a specialist department catering for students on the autism spectrum. The school's catchment area covers Woolhampton, Bradfield, Beenham, Englefield and Basildon.

== Places of worship ==
=== Medieval Chapel of Ease ===
There is documentary evidence from 1291 of a chapel dedicated to St John the Baptist at Theale, belonging to the nunnery of Goring Priory at Goring-on-Thames. This monastery also owned the adjacent manor of Sulham. In the 19th century, villager A. Harrison of the Berkshire Local History Club wrote that the chapel was on the same site as the current church, and that it had some connection with Englefield church. The club was a private antiquarian society, the members of which passed notes about the history of their respective localities to each other.

In 1542, after Henry VIII's dissolution of the monasteries, the chapel was granted to Sir Leonard Chamberlain (the High Sheriff of Berkshire) and to Richard Andrews. The following year, it was transferred to the Burgoyne family by Chamberlain and Richard Hayles. In 1545 the Burgoyne family sold the chapel to Richard Bartlett, who in turn sold it to Humphrey Forster of Aldermaston in 1587. In 1609, Forster's son sold the property to Anthony Blagrave of Sonning, from whom the Wilder family purchased it in 1632. The last mention of the chapel as a working place of worship is a reference dated 1675 in the family's deeds. The old chapel edifice was reportedly demolished in 1808, with evidence of its foundations being discovered in the building of the present church.

=== New Chapel of Ease ===
In 1799 Rev Thomas Sheppard built a new chapel of ease, at a time when Theale was still part of Tilehurst Parish. He held the advowson of Tilehurst church, and so had the authority to order this. The chapel was built of brick, had a bellcote, and was situated to the south-west of the present church., So, for almost a decade two chapel edifices stood near to each other.

=== Holy Trinity Church ===
Holy Trinity Church, is a Church of England parish church in the Diocese of Oxford. It was completed in 1832 in the Early English style, influenced by Salisbury Cathedral. The church is a Grade I listed building.

=== St Luke's Church ===
The Roman Catholic church of St Luke is a modern building on Englefield Road. This is the only other place of worship in the village. It is a subsidiary church of the Catholic parish of Woolhampton, and is run by Douai Abbey. The plan is based on an elongated pentagon, and the walls are in red brick. The roof has five pitches meeting at a tall, thin spire in white.

=== Nonconformity ===
There are now no Nonconformist congregations in the village. The Congregational church founded a congregation in Theale in about 1875. This took over the Angel Inn in the High Street in 1913, demolished the allegedly 16th-century building and built a chapel. This closed in 1996, and was itself replaced by apartments called Angel Court in 2007. The Primitive Methodist Church founded a chapel in the village at 59 High Street about 1868, which survived until 1992. It was demolished for Beaumont House, but a stone plaque in the wall of this commemorates it.

== Sport and recreation ==
There is a public meeting hall run by the parish council, the John Cumber Hall, at 38a High Street. The village has its Recreation Ground on the Englefield Road. This is home to the Theale and Tilehurst Cricket Club which play in the Thames Valley Cricket League. Here also is the main village hall, home to the Theale Club which is a social club with a bar. A small skatepark is located here. The North Street Playing Fields is a separate location on the other side of the road. It is used by the Theale Tigers Youth Football Club, but part of it was released for a new primary school in 2018. The Theale Golf Club has an 18-hole golf course to the north of the village, the club house being approached via a driveway from Englefield Road. It was laid out in 1996. "Pay and Play" is available, as are day tickets and twilight rates. Dr Ellerton's Charity Allotments are a large set of allotments off Meadow Way. They were established by a private charity, Dr Ellerton's Charity which was founded in 1899 to help poor people in the parish. Theale Water Sports Club has power-boating and waterskiing on the Main Gravel Pit.

== Demography ==
According to the 2011 census, the parish had a population of 2,835. Of these, 49% (1,390) were male and 51% (1,445) were female. The populace lived in a total of 1,252 dwellings. The majority of working residents in Theale are employed in professional or administrative roles. Between 89% and 90% of residents considered their ethnicity to be White British.

2011 Published Statistics: Population, home ownership and extracts from Physical Environment, surveyed in 2005
Output area	Homes owned outright	Owned with a loan	Socially rented	Privately rented	Other	km^{2} roads	km^{2} water	km^{2} domestic gardens	Usual residents	km^{2}
Civil parish	289	475	270	192	9	0.244	0.379	0.288	2835	3.64

== Sources ==
- Baker, J (1802), The Imperial Guide, with Picturesque Plans of the Great Post-Roads, London: Whittingham
- British Archaeological Association (1865), The Archaeological Journal, vol. 2, London: Longman, Brown, Green, and Longman
- Brown, J (1816), Encyclopaedia Perthensis, vol. 22, Edinburgh: John Brown
- Cole, S (2007), West from Paddington, Malvern, Worcestershire: Etica Press, ISBN 9781905633050
- Defoe, D (1748), A Tour Through the Whole Island of Great Britain: Divided into Circuits or Journeys, vol. 2, London: S Birt and T Osborne
- Dickens, C (1869), All the Year Round: A Weekly Journal, London: Chapman and Hall
- Ditchfield, P H; Page, W (1923), A History of the County of Berkshire, vol. 3, London: Institute of Historical Research
- Geological Society of London (1861), The Quarterly Journal of the Geological Society of London, vol. 1, London: The Society
- Great Britain Board of Agriculture (1809), Agricultural Surveys: Berkshire, vol. 2, London: Great Britain Board of Agriculture
- Handy, A (1825), Mechanics' Magazine and Journal of Science, Arts, and Manufactures, vol. 4, London: Knight and Lacey
- Knight, C (1840), Berkshire: Including a Full Description of Windsor Castle, London: C. Knight
- Loudon, J C (1833), The Gardener's Magazine and Register of Rural and Domestic Improvement, vol. 9, London: Longman, Rees, Orome, Brown and Green
- Mars, A (2003), The Church of The Most Holy Trinity: Theale with North Street (PDF), Theale, Berkshire: The Church of The Most Holy Trinity
- Mendes da Costa, E (1757), A Natural History of Fossils, London: Davis and Reymers
- Newbury & District (2013), 101/104/105 timetable (PDF), Newbury, Berkshire: West Berkshire Council
- Office for National Statistics (2011a), Area: Theale CP (Parish):Key Figures for 2011 Census, London: Office for National Statistics
- Office for National Statistics (2011b), Area: Theale CP (Parish): Occupation, 2011, London: Office for National Statistics
- Office for National Statistics (2011c), Area: Theale CP (Parish): Ethnic Group, 2011, London: Office for National Statistics
- Pevsner, N (1966), The Buildings of England: Berkshire, Harmondsworth: Penguin Books
- Robertson, J G (1843), The Environs of Reading, Reading, Berkshire: John Snare
- Rose, H J; Maitland, S R (1832), The British Magazine, vol. 2, London: John Turrill
- Rushworth, J (1701), Historical Collections of Private Passages of State, Weighty Matters in Law, Remarkable Proceedings in Five Parliaments, vol. 6, London: Rushworth
- Rushworth, J (1708), Mr. Rushworth's Historical Collections: Abridg'd and Improv'd, vol. 5, London: Rushworth
- South East Rural Towns Partnership (2011), Theale, Reading, Berkshire: South East Rural Towns Partnership, archived from the original on 29 September 2011
- Theale Church of England Primary School, Theale C of E Primary School, Cheltenham, Gloucestershire: Internet Kit
- Urban, S (1852), The Gentleman's Magazine, London: John Bowyer Nichols and Son
- West Berkshire Council (2009), Parent's Guide to Admissions to Secondary Schools in West Berkshire 2009/10, Newbury, Berkshire: West Berkshire Council
- Whitlocke, B (1853), Memorials of the English Affairs from the Beginning of the Reign, vol. 1, Oxford, Oxfordshire: Oxford University Press
