= Calcot, Berkshire =

Coordinates: 51°26′29″N 1°02′58″W

Calcot
- Village
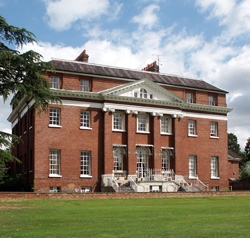
- Calcot Park House

- Location within Berkshire
- Population: 9,093
- OS grid reference: SU660718
- Civil parish: Holybrook; Tilehurst
- Unitary authority: West Berkshire
- Ceremonial county: Berkshire
- Region: South East
- Country: England
- Sovereign state: United Kingdom
- Post town: READING
- Postcode district: RG31
- Dialling code: 0118
- Police: Thames Valley
- Fire: Royal Berkshire
- Ambulance: South Central
- UK Parliament: Reading West and Mid Berkshire

Calcot, or Calcot Row, is a village in West Berkshire, England. Calcot is within the built-up area of Reading, located about 3 miles (4.8 km) out of the town centre, and straddles the historic A4 Bath Road. It sits between the hamlet of Horncastle and Junction 12 of the M4 motorway.

Tilehurst is to the north, and the village of Theale is to the west, across the motorway. Its named neighbourhoods include Beansheaf Farm, Fords Farm and Calcot Place south of the centre developed in the early 21st century. It is contiguous with Reading and Theale.

== Local government ==
Although now a suburb of Reading, Calcot is not within the Borough of Reading. Rather it is split between the civil parishes of Holybrook and Tilehurst Without, with that part of Calcot north of the Bath Road in Tilehurst parish and that part south in Holybrook parish. The whole of Holybrook parish and the part of Calcot within Tilehurst parish, form the Calcot electoral ward of the unitary authority of West Berkshire. Both parishes have elected parish councils and, together with the unitary authority, are responsible for different aspects of local government. Calcot is part of the Reading West and Mid Berkshire parliamentary constituency.

== Statistics ==
The Calcot ward of West Berkshire has an area of 324 ha and a total population of 9,093 living in 3,554 dwellings.

== Schools ==
Calcot has two primary schools serving pupils aged 4 to 11. Serving the Beansheaf and Fords Farm communities to the south of the A4 Bath Road is Kennet Valley Primary School while north of the A4, both sharing the same grounds, are Calcot Junior School and Calcot Infant School, which incorporates a nursery. When children leave primary school at 11 they attend secondary schools in neighbouring villages.

=== Calcot Junior School ===
Calcot Junior School is a primary school in the village that serves pupils from the age of 7-11. The school shares its ground with Calcot Infant School after both parties merged in January 2006. It is now part of the federation Calcot Schools. It originally opened in 1937 with 3 classrooms and in 1947, the school expanded to have a hall and more classrooms. The original location of the school is the south of the site which is now the Infant School. In 1957, the current Junior building was built and was expanded in 1985. As the new Junior School was established, the separation between the Infants and Juniors was solidified and both began to operate differently with different Head teachers and staff.

In 2004, the Juniors pupil membership decreased from 319 to only 245 whilst the Infants went from 209 to 178. Due to this, West Berkshire Council, the governing body, decided to suggest the idea of merging the two school. In 2006 January and backed by the Independent Schools Organisation Committee, the two schools merged to become what known as Calcot Schools. Linda McCulloch-Smith was appointed as the Executive Head teacher of both schools. In 2009, the second full Ofsted inspection was 'inadequate' which led to special measures being implemented. In 2010, McCulloch-Smith resigned as Executive Head teacher and was replaced by Angela Hartley-Kane as interim Executive Head teacher. After 5 years of interim leadership, Florence Rostron became the permanent head of both schools.

In 2023, the latest Ofsted inspection results showed a 'good' rating which meant the school achieved its target 4 times. In early 2025, the school announced, along with the Infants that it was having an expansion of a new 2 years old nursery and are opening places for the new area.

The governing body of the school is West Berkshire Council since 1998 after the former Berkshire County Council was disbanded. Currently there is a joint-chair of Julia Kidd and Joe Lally and the Executive Head teacher is Florence Rostron.

== Places of interest ==
Calcot Park is a large country house and estate, to the north east of Calcot. Over the years the estate has been the home to Peter Vanlore, Frances Kendrick, and to John Blagrave, a relative of the mathematician John Blagrave, who built the present house in 1759. Today the house has been converted into apartments and the grounds have become a golf course.

Calcot Mill is a former watermill on the Holy Brook. It was built on the site of a mill originally owned by Reading Abbey and has been converted into apartments.

Pincent's Kiln is an Site of Special Scientific Interest (SSSI) on the western border of the area.

== Commerce ==
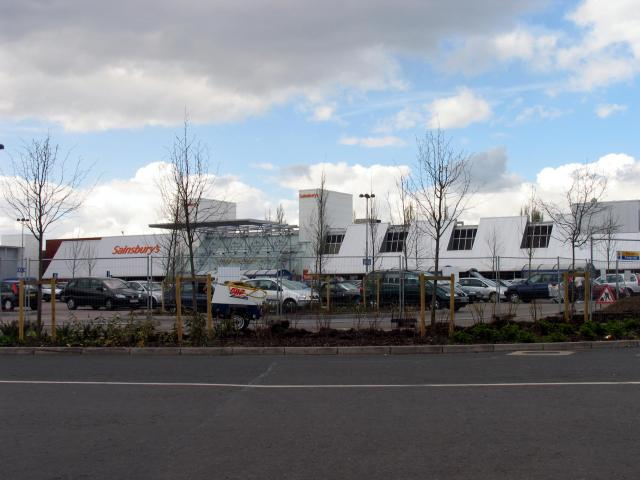
SavaCentre Hypermarket in Calcot, Reading

Calcot is home to two large shopping complexes – the SavaCentre and the Pincents Lane Retail Park; both close to Junction 12 of the M4 motorway. In September 1981, an 81,000 ft^{2} (7,500 m^{2}) hypermarket, a BHS and Sainsbury's joint enterprise, opened. At the time, it was one of the largest hypermarkets in the United Kingdom. This store featured in the SavaCentre TV adverts in 1983. In 1989, Sainsbury's bought out BHS's 50% share in the partnership, and the following year the store was extended by 20,000 ft^{2} (1,900 m^{2}) to over 101,000 ft^{2} (9,400 m^{2}). In August 1998, it was re-modelled, to provide a greater emphasis on food, at a cost £26m. The SavaCentre was downsized and re-branded as Sainsbury's in 2005, with the extension being sold off to Next. A further refurbishment took place in 2008.

At the same time, the SavaCentre site was rebranded as the Calcot Retail Park. In 2015, the retail park was demolished (apart from the Dunelm Mill store) and a new branch of IKEA was opened in its place in July 2016. The original plan was for a three-storey 410,000 sq ft (38,000 m^{2}) store, but in the end a reduced 342,780 sq ft (31,845 m^{2}) store over two floors was built because of the growth in online shopping.

== Transport ==
Calcot is east of the M4 motorway. Local bus services are provided by Reading Buses. The nearest railway stations are Theale, Tilehurst and Reading West.

== Notable people ==
In 1881 the American post-impressionist painter John Singer Sargent spent the summer with his family in the village.
