= Holy Brook =

Stream, probably partly artificial, in the United Kingdom

Coordinates: 51.4556°N 0.9653°W

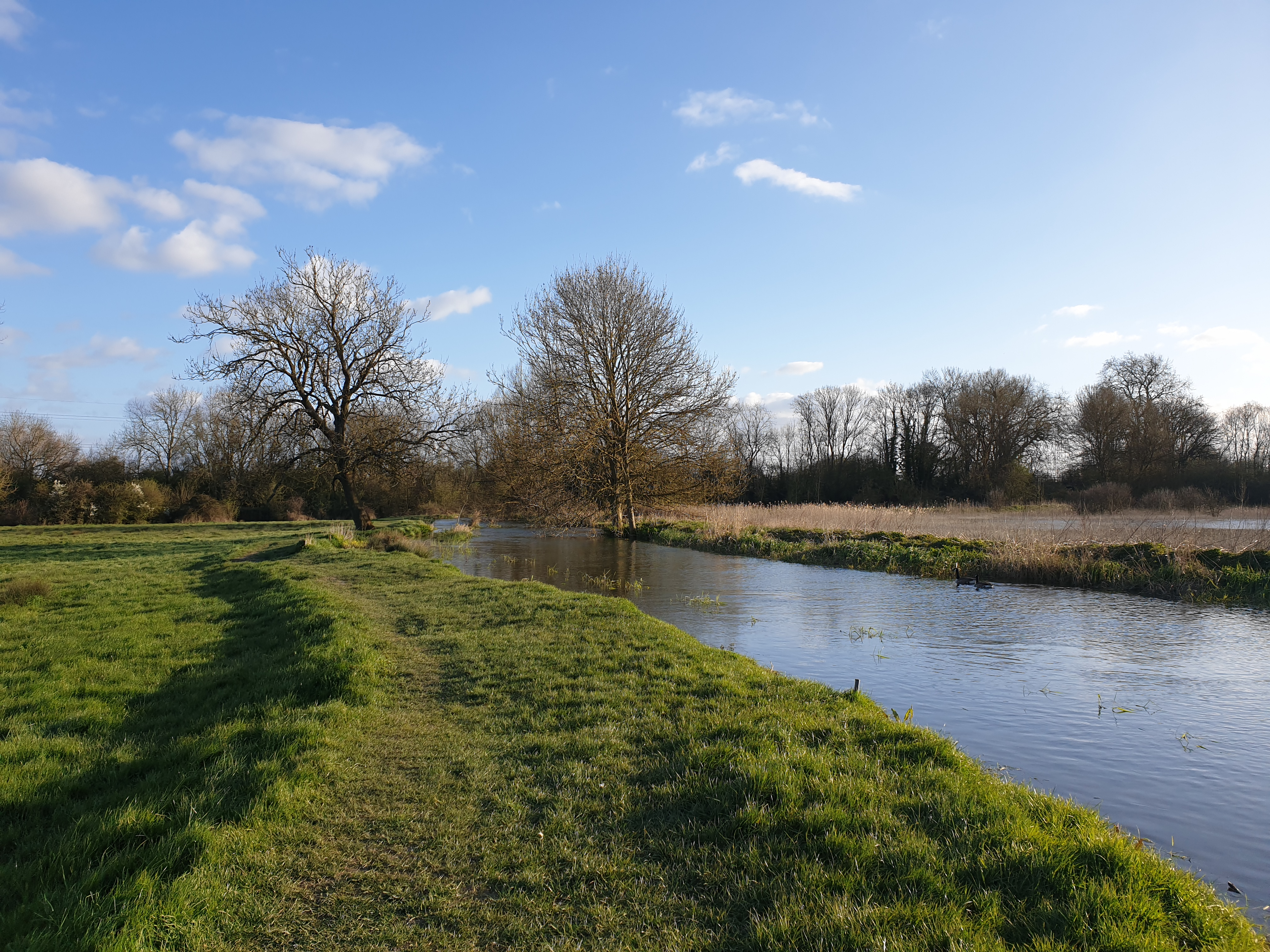
- The Holy Brook on the water meadows, with the low sun highlighting the artificial banking

Location
- Country: England
- County: Berkshire
- Town: Reading

The Holy Brook is a channel of the River Kennet that flows through the English town of Reading. While of considerable historical significance, the origin and nature of the brook is still unclear. It is probable that some parts of the channel are natural, while other parts were created in medieval times by the monks of Reading Abbey to supply water mills and fish ponds. John Speed's map of Reading (c.1610) shows the brook flowing in the open air throughout, but a map from 1835 shows the town centre section to have been largely culverted by then, as is the case now.

The Holy Brook leaves the main channel of the Kennet at a brick structure known as the Arrowhead near the village of Theale, and flows to the north of the main channel until rejoining it just downstream of the centre of Reading. The channel is some 6 miles (9.7 km) in length, of which approximately 600 metres (2,000 ft) are culverted.

== Course ==
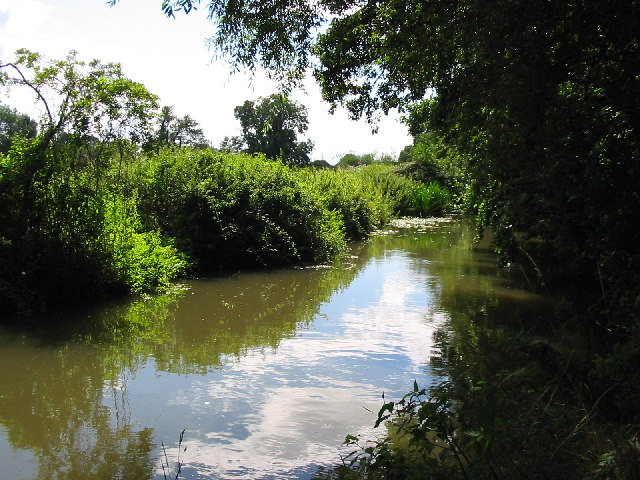
The Holy Brook towards its upstream end, to the south of Calcot.

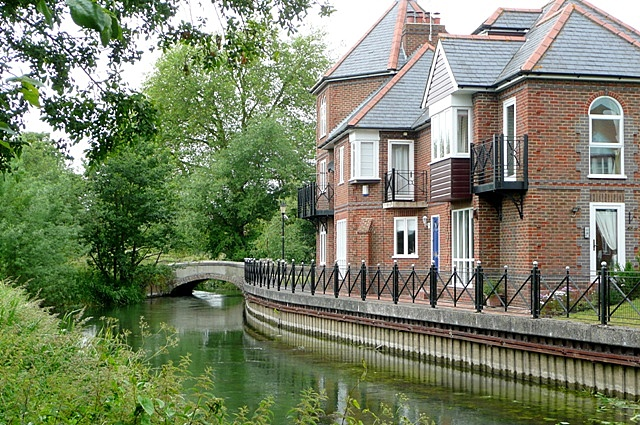
The Holy Brook at Coley Park Farm on its approach to Reading.

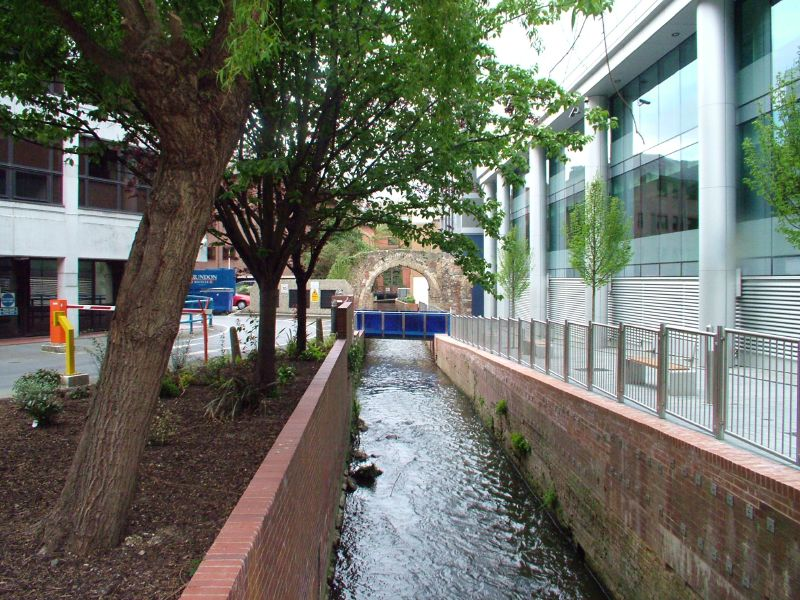
The Holy Brook close to its outfall, with the ruins of the Abbey Mill in the distance.

For the first stretch of its route, the channel forms the boundary between the Reading suburbs of Beansheaf Farm, Fords Farm, Calcot, Southcote and Coley Park (all to the north of the brook), and the Kennet flood meadows (to the south). At Calcot, the brook passes Calcot Mill, one of two water mills that were driven by the brook and which originally belonged to the abbey. In this area the channel gives its name to the nearby civil parish of Holybrook. In some stretches, especially behind Coley Park, the brook is noticeably embanked along the hillside above the lower water meadows, demonstrating its artificial origins. Once past Coley Park the Holy Brook flows through the Victorian suburb of Coley, before reaching the town centre. At Coley, an overflow weir diverts excess water back to the Kennet, at a point which was once the site of a lido.

In the centre of Reading, the Holy Brook is culverted for several stretches, only showing itself intermittently. The channel can clearly be seen where it flows under one of the entrances to the Oracle shopping centre, where it has given its name to the 'Holy Brook Mall,' the lower of the two enclosed shopping malls within the centre. It is also visible for about 10 metres in the rear yard of the Purple Turtle bar and for a couple of metres outside the front door of Reading Central Library. The culverted sections of the Holy Brook involve a number of different construction techniques from various ages. The most notable section, behind the buildings on Castle Street, is grade II* listed and built of ribbed limestone blocks that may be reclaimed stone from Reading Abbey. Other sections include brick vaults, iron-girder roofing, concrete culverts, and modern corrugated steel construction.

At its eastern end, once it has passed under the Central Library, the Holy Brook re-emerges into the open, at a point where it once formed the southern boundary of Reading Abbey. Here the brook provided the driving force for the Abbey Mill, of which only vestiges remain, as well as supplying water to the Abbey's necessarium. Today the brook passes between the backs of modern office blocks before re-entering the north channel of the River Kennet where the latter makes a right-angle turn immediately to the south of the ruins of the Abbey church.

== Water quality ==
The Environment Agency measures the water quality of the river systems in England. Each is given an overall ecological status, which may be one of five levels: high, good, moderate, poor and bad. There are several components that are used to determine this, including biological status, which looks at the quantity and varieties of invertebrates, angiosperms and fish, and chemical status, which compares the concentrations of various chemicals against known safe concentrations. Chemical status is rated good or fail.

Water quality of the Holy Brook in 2019:

| Section | Ecological Status | Chemical Status | Overall Status | Length | Catchment | Channel |
|---|---|---|---|---|---|---|
| Holy Brook | Moderate | Fail | Moderate | 9.118 km (5.666 mi) | 11.675 km^{2} (4.508 sq mi) | |

== Bibliography ==
- Sowen, Adam; Castle, Sally; Hay, Peter (2003). The Holy Brook or The Granators Tale. Two Rivers Press. ISBN 1-901677-34-6.
- Slade, Cecil (2001). The Town of Reading and its Abbey. MRM Associates Ltd. ISBN 0-9517719-4-9.
