= Calcot Mill =

Watermill in Berkshire, England

- Location within Berkshire
- 51°26′17″N 1°02′18″W
- Type: Watermill
- Location: Mill Lane, Calcot

Site notes
- Area: Berkshire

Calcot Mill is an historic former watermill on the Holy Brook, a channel of the River Kennet in the English county of Berkshire. The mill is situated to the south of Calcot, a suburb of Reading, in the civil parish of Holybrook, formerly in the parish of Theale and earlier still in the parish of Tilehurst.

The original mill belonged to Reading Abbey, whose monks are believed to have created the Holy Brook as a water supply to this and other mills owned by them.

Between 1876 and 1928 the GWR operated a siding serving the mill which was shunted by a horse.

In 1966, the mill, then owned by Calcot Flour Mills, was badly damaged by fire. Since then the building has been converted to apartments.

== See also ==
- List of watermills in the United Kingdom
