= A339 road =

Road in England

A339

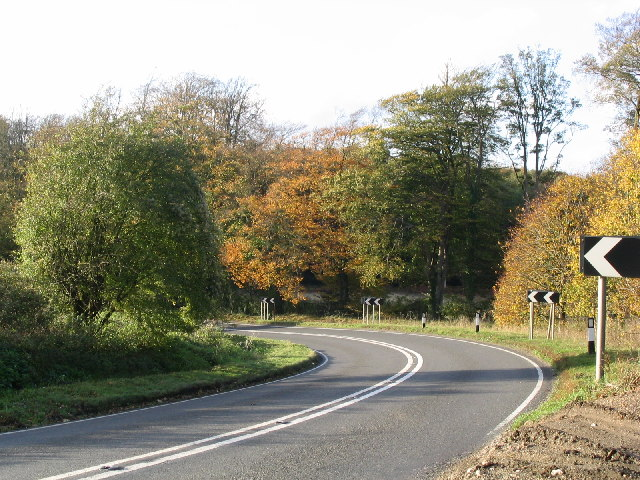
- Bend on the A339, near Winslade is typical of the many bends between Basingstoke and Alton

Major junctions
- North end: Newbury
- A34; A4 A343 A340; A33 A3010; A30; A31
- South end: Alton

Location
- Country: United Kingdom
- Counties: Hampshire, Berkshire

Road network
- Roads in the United Kingdom; Motorways; A and B road zones
← A338	→ A340

The A339 is a 32-mile-long (51 km) A road in England. It is the main road between Newbury in Berkshire and Alton in Hampshire. It also forms the eastern and northern parts of the Basingstoke Ring Road. Its most northern end eventually merges into the A34 north of Newbury just before meeting the M4 at J13 (Chieveley services). The section between the A34 and Newbury town centre was previously part of the A34.

== Points of interest ==
Point	Coordinates (Links to map resources)	OS Grid Ref	Notes
Newbury, Berkshire	51.4376°N 1.3210°W	SU47297117	Start, A34, Snelsmore Common, Berkshire
Alton, Hampshire	51.1359°N 0.9775°W	SU71633789	End, A31, Alton, Hampshire
