= RAF Theale =

Former Royal Air Force station in Berkshire, England

RAF Theale
- Near Theale, Berkshire in England

Site information
- Type: Royal Air Force satellite station
- Owner: Air Ministry
- Operator: Royal Air Force
- Controlled by: RAF Flying Training Command

Location
- Shown within Berkshire RAF Theale (the United Kingdom)
- Coordinates: 51°25′37″N 1°03′56″W

Site history
- Built: 1935
- In use: 1935-1948
- Battles/wars: European theatre of World War II

Royal Air Force Theale or more simply RAF Theale is a former Royal Air Force satellite station located south of Theale, Berkshire, England.

The following units were here at some point:

- Relief Landing Ground for No. 8 Elementary Flying Training School RAF (September 1939 - July 1941)
- No. 26 Elementary Flying Training School RAF (August 1941 - July 1945)
- No. 42 Group Communication Flight RAF (1942 - May 1944)
- No. 128 Gliding School RAF (July 1944 - July 1948)
- No. 2818 Squadron RAF Regiment
- Air Crew Disposal Unit (October - December 1945)

== Current use ==
The site is now used as gravel pits and leisure activities.
