= Padworth =

Coordinates: 51°23′35″N 1°06′50″W

- Village and civil parish
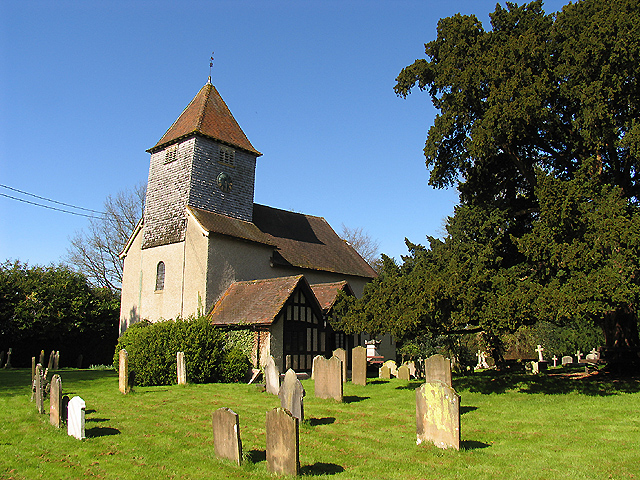
- Padworth church is next to Padworth College, once the manor of the parish.

- Location within Berkshire
- Area: 5.71 km^{2} (2.20 sq mi)
- Population: 919 (2011 census)
  - Density: 161/km^{2} (420/sq mi)
- OS grid reference: SU619661
- Civil parish: Padworth
- Unitary authority: West Berkshire
- Ceremonial county: Berkshire
- Region: South East
- Country: England
- Sovereign state: United Kingdom
- Post town: Reading
- Postcode district: RG7
- Dialling code: 0118
- Police: Thames Valley
- Fire: Royal Berkshire
- Ambulance: South Central
- UK Parliament: Reading West and Mid Berkshire
- Website: https://www.padworthparishcouncil.gov.uk/

Padworth is a dispersed settlement and civil parish in the English county of Berkshire, with the nearest town being Tadley. Padworth is in the unitary authority of West Berkshire, and its main settlement is at Aldermaston Wharf or Lower Padworth, where there is Aldermaston railway station. It has its southern boundary with Mortimer West End, Hampshire. The south of the parish is wooded towards its edges and the north of the parish is agricultural with a hotel beside the Kennet and Avon Canal. In the centre of the parish is a Georgian manor house, later used as a school, Padworth College.

== Geography and amenities ==
Padworth is built around the Norman church and the manor house, which from 1748 was the home of the Darby-Griffith family. In 1963 the house was converted into Padworth College, an independent school. In spring 2025, the school announced it would close at the end of the 2024–25 academic year, and the building put up for sale.

The two halves of the parish can be separated thus:

- Lower Padworth or Aldermaston Wharf, is mostly concentrated along the A4 Bath Road – this area has the vast majority of homes. It is a built-up nucleated village and low rise locality.
- Padworth Common sometimes describes all of the scattered south but strictly speaking only includes land outside of the farmland of the former manor centred on the site of Padworth College.

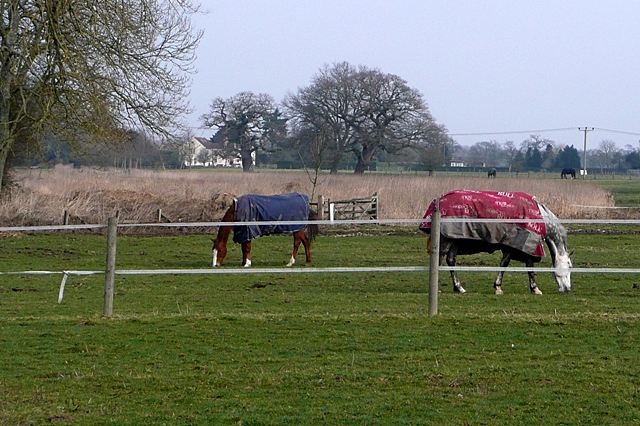
Riding horses at Padworth College's Riding School at Home Farm.

== Economy ==
A 'fishery in the Kenette' was among the possessions of the manor in 1586, and a fishery is mentioned as early as 1378. There is a Scheduled Monument fish-pond north of the former manor house. In 1870 its property was valued at £1,839 (equivalent to £189,259 in 2025) while its population was much smaller than today, 298, living in 59 houses.

The whole parish is noted by the 1920s to be very well watered, and the north-eastern part draws on the natural advantage of a fairly flat landscape and water close to the surface from the River Kennet. The soil retains a strength from its inorganic layers being gravel and the subsoil impermeable clay. The local economy in the 1920s centred on the chief crops: wheat, barley, oats and root vegetables. These remain regular crops in Padworth alongside hay meadows for livestock, horses and donkeys.

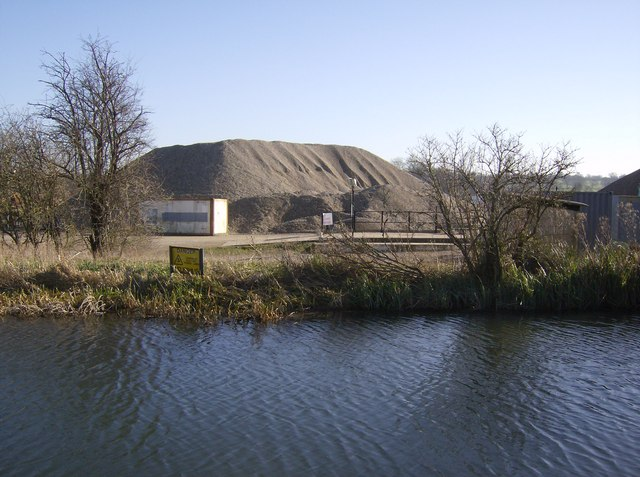
Gravel is extracted from land close to the Kennet in Padworth

Gravel extraction, education, agriculture, transport and tourism all provide jobs in Padworth itself. Aldermaston railway station at Aldermaston Wharf serves two of these sectors. Commuting to towns, industrial, logistic and trading business centres is the most common source of employment as at the 2011 census, with for instance Reading and Newbury about 20–30 minutes away whether by rail or by access to the M4 motorway. Tadley, the nearest town, also provides a major source of retail, leisure and general high street service employment.

== History ==
Grim's Ditch which runs from the mid-south of the area 0.5 miles (0.80 km) (into the southern forest of Ufton Nervet) is posited to be a 'sub-Roman' bank and ditch dug to defend Calleva Atrebatum (Silchester) when the Anglo-Saxons began to settle in the area. The place is recorded in such documents as the Assize Rolls and national Feet of Fines (on property sale) as Peadanwurthe (10th century); Peteorde (11th century); Pedewurth (12th century); Padewrd, Padworze (13th century); Padesworth, Pappeworth (14th century).

=== Manors ===
A full descent of the manor, including its earliest known grant of 956 and during the Black Death, is provided by the fully referenced text of the Victoria County History for this parish, compiled here in 1923. A secondary manor of Padworth, Hussey's, existed under John de la Husse in the 13th century, after whom it was named. In the Domesday Book, 2½ hides were farmed; which was held by William de Ow and a man named 'Gozelin'. In this instance, its Saxon era owner was recorded as 'Ælfstan', with its nominal dues going to Edward the Confessor.

The period of titled bearers owning either manor was when the main manor was held by the Tichborne baronets and the Forster baronets (1629–1681). The manor house is a grade II* listed building. It was built afresh in 1769 by the designs of John Hobcraft, and has plasterwork by Joseph Rose. Its entrance is a double-height space, and has a staircase with a wrought iron balustrade to three sides. It has a vaulted 3-bay arched arcade on each floor to one side with Doric columns on the ground floor and columns with Adamesque capitals on the floor above.

=== Other land ===
Beenham and Padworth Inclosures Act 1811
- Act of Parliament
- Parliament of the United Kingdom
- Long title: An Act for inclosing several Open and Common Fields, Meadows, Pastures; and other Commonable and Waste Lands in the several Parishes of Beenham and Padworth, in Berks.
- Citation: 51 Geo. 3. c. cxlii

Dates
- Royal assent: 31 May 1811

Text of statute as originally enacted

Place names that were here in the 17th century are: Ball's Pidle, Yew Pidle, Pondes Close, Little and Great Burfeildes, Culmers Wood and Bartholomew's, Brickworth Coppice. The inclosure of the common land at Padworth was by its local act of Parliament, the Beenham and Padworth Inclosures Act 1811 (51 Geo. 3. c. cxlii), under the established limited compensatory procedures of the time.

== Church ==
The Church of England parish church of St John the Baptist, is aisleless and built about 1130 with two three-light Tudor styled ornately carved windows, and with its vestry and porch having been added in 1890. A smaller Tudor window, with two lights on the south-east square tower façade, above the font, which does not have the entrance. The roof of the nave was largely replaced in the 19th century. Rare features include the Norman chancel arch and north and south doorways, the semi-domed apse and the 18th-century monuments. It is grade I listed building.

The church's advowson was from Pamber Priory in 1291 when various tithes and donations provided the Prior's pension. Upon the Dissolution of the Monasteries, the advowson was exercised by the Crown until the 19th century. A parish rentcharge, totalling £250 in 1848, was received by the rector, the parishioners having commutated the tithes. The parish glebe stood at 28 acres (0.11 km^{2}). By 1923 the rector's patron was the Lord Chancellor. The parish is united as part of the benefice of Stratfield Mortimer, Mortimer West End and Padworth which has four churches and two church schools.

== Demography ==
2011 Published Statistics: Population, home ownership and area
Output area	Homes owned outright	Owned with a loan	Socially rented	Privately rented	Other	Usual residents	km²
Civil parish	88	130	68	40	8	919	5.71
