= Theale Green School =

Location
- Theale, Berkshire, RG7 5DA; England; 51.43654°N 1.08625°W

Information
- Type: Academy
- Established: 1963
- Founder: Ken Shield
- Department for Education URN: 145945 Tables
- Ofsted: Reports
- Chair of Theale Green Trust: John Gate
- Head of school: Charlotte Badarello
- Gender: Coeducational
- Age: 11 to 18
- Enrolment: 721
- Houses: Benyon, Hunt, Piper and Scott
- Website: https://www.thealegreen.w-berks.sch.uk/

Theale Green School is a coeducational secondary school and sixth form with academy status, located in the village of Theale, Berkshire, England.

The school has 721 pupils on roll, 99 of whom are in the sixth form.

== History ==
=== Early years ===
The school was founded as Theale Grammar School in 1963 by Ken J V Shield, a graduate of Northampton Grammar School and the University of Cambridge who had previously taught at Leeds Modern School and Hulme Grammar School, and had been deputy head at Thomas Bennett Community College in Crawley. Upon opening, the school was designed to provide education for 870 pupils.

Throughout the 1960s the school was extensively expanded, with the addition of the gymnasium, music department, sixth form area, and numerous classrooms. In the early 1970s, the school became a comprehensive and was renamed Theale Green. A 1971 estimate predicted that the enrolment would rise to 1,250 by the middle of the decade.

=== Expansion ===
In 1985 Chris Gittins was appointed as headteacher. A graduate of Leighton Park School and Cambridge University, he had previously taught at Swanley School, Thomas Bennett School, and Longsands Academy in Cambridgeshire. The school pioneered local management of schools prior to the Education Reform Act 1988 with the appointment of the first bursar in Berkshire. In 1987, Theale Green became a community school. With an expanded sixth form, the school grew to 1,350 students.

In 1992 the school designed and developed the first Learning Support Unit in England to provide a facility for students with special educational needs. The following year the school won a national competition to achieve funding under the government's Technology Schools Initiative (TSI), and became one of the first four arts colleges when the specialist schools superseded the TSI the following year.

=== 21st century ===
In 2002 Gittins became the government's lead advisor on improving behaviour and attendance in schools, and Sue Marshall was appointed headteacher, moving from the neighbouring Clere School in Hampshire. In 2010–11, the sixth form complex was rebuilt; the new building comprises classrooms, computer facilities, study rooms and a new common room. In October 2011, the school was given a Notice to Improve by Ofsted. The report stated: "The proportion gaining five or more A* to C grades at GCSE including English and mathematics has now fallen to below the national average and progress for average ability students across the school, particularly in mathematics and science, was inadequate." The follow-up visit, made in October 2012 and published in December 2012, found that the school had not made sufficient improvement on the previous report. As a result of this, the school was placed in special measures, and headteacher Sue Marshall announced her resignation. She was succeeded by David Bromfield, former principal of Manchester Academy. In September 2013, the school converted to academy status and the word "community" was dropped from its name. After 19 months as the headteacher, Bromfield left the school in August 2014 by mutual consent. He was replaced by Sally Beeson, a former assistant headteacher at nearby Bradfield College.

In its May 2017 Ofsted report, the school received a "requires improvement" rating; while the sixth form programme was found to be a strength of the school. Beeson left her role at the end of that academic year and then-deputy head Julie Turner was announced as interim head from September 2017. In September 2018, the school appointed Joanna Halliday, the former head of King Alfred's Academy in Wantage, as its head teacher. That academic year, the school became part of the Activate Learning Education Trust.

Its 2022 Ofsted inspection rated the school "good".

== House system ==
The school operates a house system. There are four houses, which each have a Head of House and a team of tutors. House prefects are appointed by the Head of House. The four houses are:

- Benyon
- Hunt
- Piper
- Scott

Benyon is named after the Benyon family who own the nearby Englefield estate and the land on which the school was built. The house's mascot is a lion. Hunt is named after John Hunt, Baron Hunt (1910–1998), the leader of the 1953 British Everest Expedition. The house's mascot is a tiger, which represents strength and determination. Piper is named after John Piper (1903–1992) who donated a number of his prints to the school and who was introduced to the school by Geoffrey Eastop, whose wife was the head of the art department. The house's mascot is a dragon named Spike. Scott is named after Peter Scott (1909–1989). The house's mascot is an eagle.

== Notable former pupils ==
- Justin Fletcher, (Mr Tumble) children's entertainer on CBeebies
- Doug Gurr (born July 1964), British businessman
