= Padworth College =

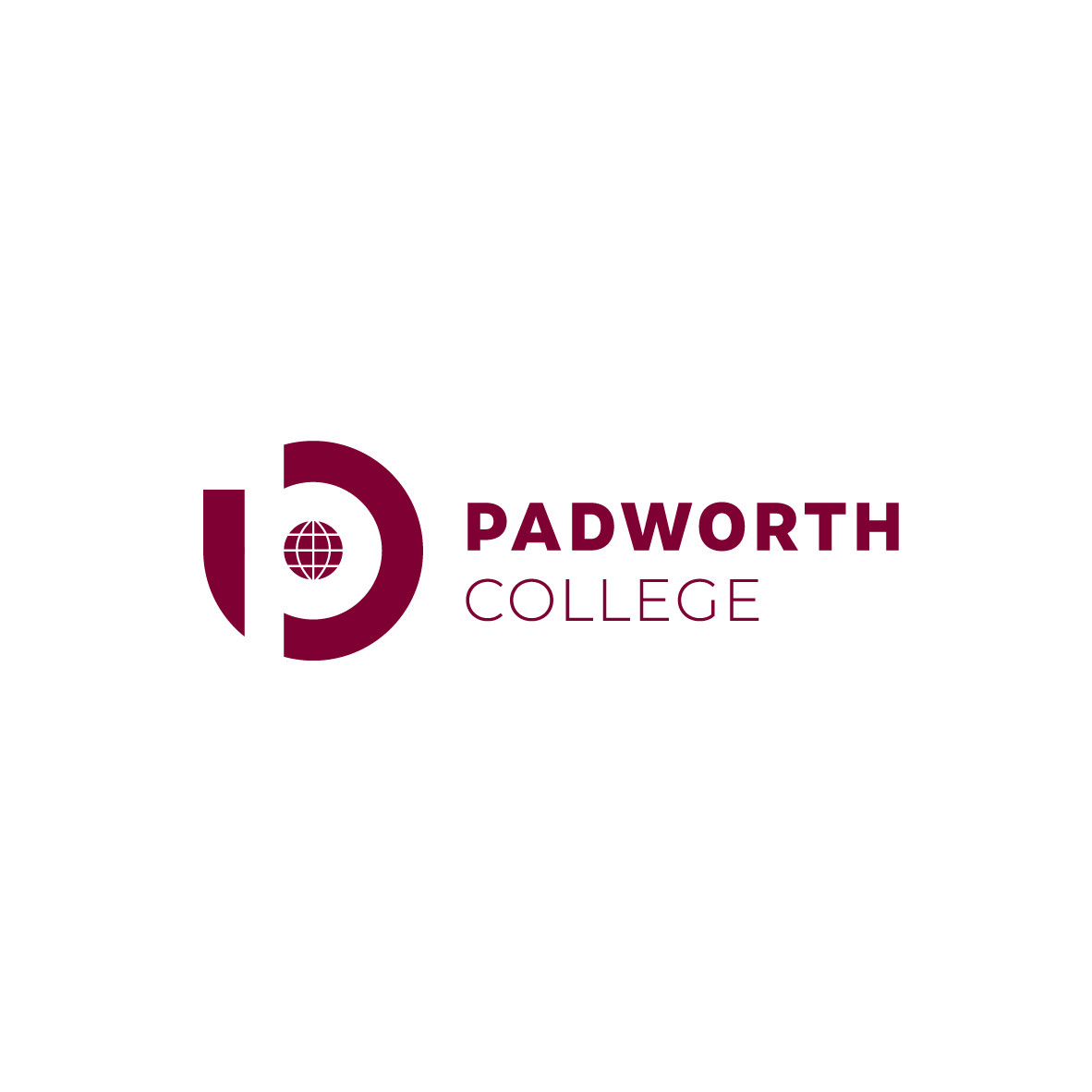

Location
- Padworth; Reading, Berkshire, Berkshire, RG7 4NR; England; 51.39201°N 1.11997°W

Information
- Type: Independent
- Established: 1963
- Founder: Peter Fison
- Local authority: West Berkshire
- Department for Education URN: 110169 Tables
- Principal: Crispin Dawson
- Gender: Coeducational
- Age: 14 to 19
- Website: visit.padworth.com

Padworth College was a co-educational private day and boarding senior school in Padworth, Berkshire. It was opened in 1963, and housed in a grade II listed Georgian house.

In spring 2025, Padworth College announced that the school would close at the end of the 2024–25 academic year, and the building put up for sale. The school is now closed, and the state is up for sale. Buildings in all: 51.680 sq ft (4801,2 sq m) and the gardens and grounds are approximately 11,04 acres (4,46 hectares).
