= Reading Central Library =

Public library in Berkshire, England

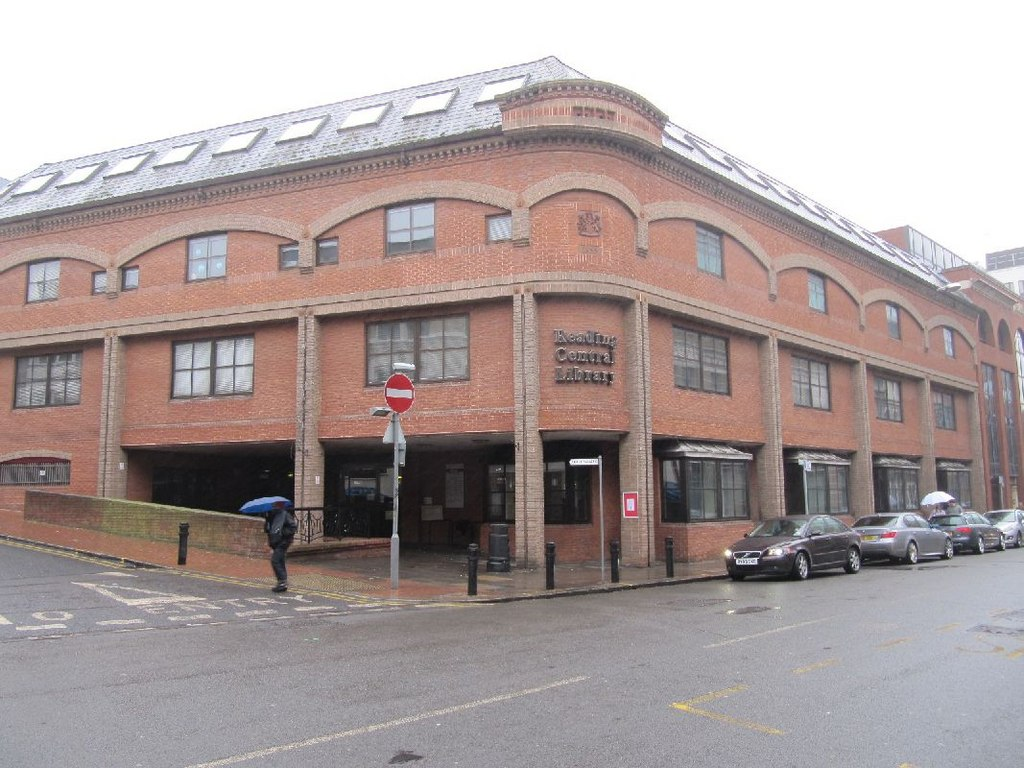
- Reading Central Library
- 51°27′10″N 0°58′23.2″W
- Location: Reading, Berkshire, UK
- Type: Public
- Branch of: Reading Borough Libraries

Collection
- Size: 100,000+

Other information
- Website: www.reading.gov.uk/leisure/libraries/

Reading Central Library is a public library in the town of Reading, in the English county of Berkshire.

== History ==
=== Reading Town Hall ===
From 1882, the main library was in Reading Town Hall. However, as early as World War I complaints were being made there was insufficient space for books and readers.

=== King's Road ===
It was only in 1982 that plans started being laid for a new central library in Reading, and building starting in 1984. This new building was opened in 1985.

The central library was in the heart of Reading on Abbey Square on the corner of the King's Road, on the former site of the Reading Abbey stables where the horses of medieval churchmen, nobility and royalty were stabled. It was also very near the old Abbey gateway, where Jane Austen went to school, and which is the ancestor of the current Abbey School. Reading Central Library was a four-story red brick building based on traditional Reading brick designs. The Holy Brook ran underneath the Library.

The Central Library contains over 60,000 books including a children's library, a large selection of fiction and non fiction books, and free Internet terminals. It also provides loans of CDs and also has a large collection of vocal and drama sets on the first floor. The first floor contains the Reading Local Studies Library which has large collections of books, photographs, maps and newspapers relating to the history of Reading and Berkshire, as well as a family history section. Special collections include books and letters by local author Mary Russell Mitford and local MP, judge and author Thomas Noon Talfourd.

Books in the library are generally ordered by Dewey Decimal Classification, though the Local Studies collection has its own library classification system. The online library catalog which includes a selection of digitised local Studies photographs can be found on the library website. It is run by a team of qualified librarians with the support of library assistants with the aim of providing good library services to the people of Reading.

=== Bridge Street ===
The Library moved from its original location on Kings Road to a newly renovated part of Reading Borough Councils Civic Offices during the summer of 2026. The new location comes with air conditioning, more seating areas including a children's library double the size of the old one as well as being more accessible to wheelchair users.
