= Arlington Business Park =

Business park in Theale, England

Arlington Park
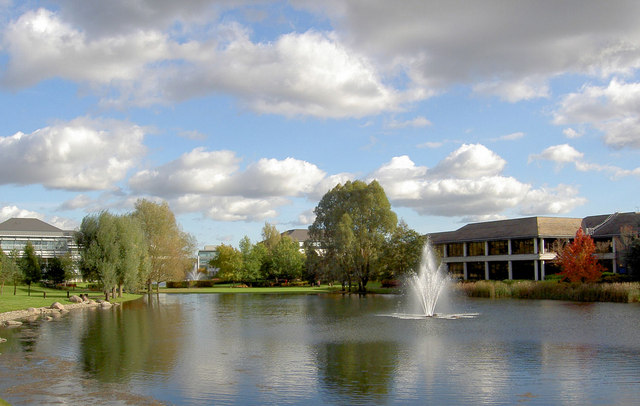
- Arlington Business Park lake

- Location in Berkshire
- Location: Theale, Berkshire, England
- Coordinates: 51.436°N 1.06861°W
- Opening date: 1989
- Owner: WillsFlower UK
- Website: www.arlingtonparkreading.com

Arlington Park is a business park in Theale (west of Reading, Berkshire), England. specially designed to blend the benefits of a modern working environment with the benefits of outdoor living.

The park is home to a number of major corporations such as Nokia, Laithwaites, Carabao, Willis Towers Watson,

The offices are based within landscaped grounds, including a lake, and has a wide range of amenities including a floating pavilion, a cafe, a gym, and a 'theatre style' landscaped space known as 'The Bowl' that holds events throughout the year. The park aims to achieve wellbeing excellence and has been designed to promote good work–life balance and help communities flourish by creating an environment that is both functional and relaxing.

Arlington Park is adjacent to Junction 12 of the M4 which provides direct access to London, the west and beyond.

Theale station is 5 minutes walk from the park with direct links to London Paddington and connections to Reading and Newbury.

The Elizabeth line opening in 2022 will run from Reading to London enabling faster connections to London's West End and East End, the City and Canary Wharf.
