= Holybrook =

Coordinates: 51.439°N 1.038°W

- Civil parish
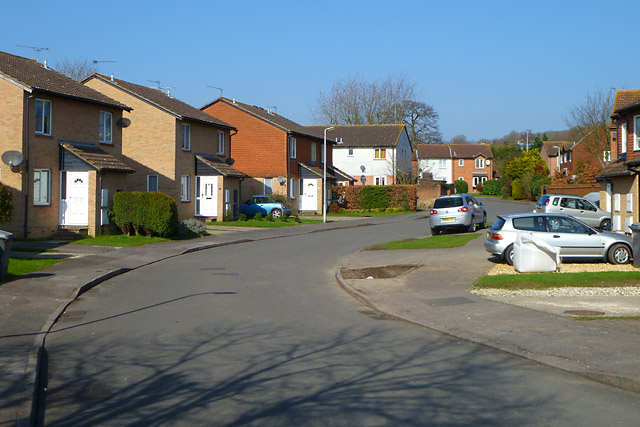
- Charlville Drive

- Location within Berkshire
- Area: 1.94 km^{2} (0.75 sq mi)
- Population: 6,919 (2011 census)
  - Density: 3,566/km^{2} (9,240/sq mi)
- OS grid reference: SU6671
- Civil parish: Holybrook
- Unitary authority: West Berkshire
- Ceremonial county: Berkshire
- Region: South East
- Country: England
- Sovereign state: United Kingdom
- Post town: Reading
- Postcode district: RG31
- Police: Thames Valley
- Fire: Royal Berkshire
- Ambulance: South Central
- UK Parliament: Reading West and Mid Berkshire

Holybrook is a civil parish, forming a contiguous part of Reading in West Berkshire and is a mixture of urban, suburban land with watercourses and flood meadows in Berkshire, England. The parish takes its name from the Holy Brook, a watercourse which forms its southern boundary and which is a corollary of the River Kennet. Its main settlements are part of Calcot those commonly known as Beansheaf Farm and Fords Farm, Holybrook and occasionally considered part of Calcot or Southcote which overlaps with this area.

== Geography and history ==
Historically, since before the Norman Conquest, this was part of the parish of Reading, when its Southcot or Southcote part was a well-dispersed settlement. Holybrook is composed of two suburbs of Reading: Beansheaf Farm and Fords Farm, together with that part of the older suburb of Calcot that lies south of the A4 Bath Road. The church of St Michael in this area was built in 1967, one of only a small minority built to serve a new parish in that decade.

The civil parish dates from 2000 when it was created from the part of Theale east of the M4 motorway.

== Demography ==
2011 Published Statistics: Population, home ownership and extracts from Physical Environment, surveyed in 2005
Output area	Homes owned outright	Owned with a loan	Socially rented	Privately rented	Other	km^{2} roads	km^{2} water	km^{2} domestic gardens	Usual residents	km^{2}
Civil parish	767	1370	340	285	13	0.236	0.024	0.626	6919	1.94

== Governance ==
The parish has an elected parish council, and falls within the area of the unitary authority of West Berkshire. The parish council and the unitary authority are responsible for different aspects of local government. The parish is in the Reading West and Mid Berkshire parliamentary constituency.
