= Aldermaston Wharf =

Coordinates: 51°24′00″N 1°08′10″W

- Village
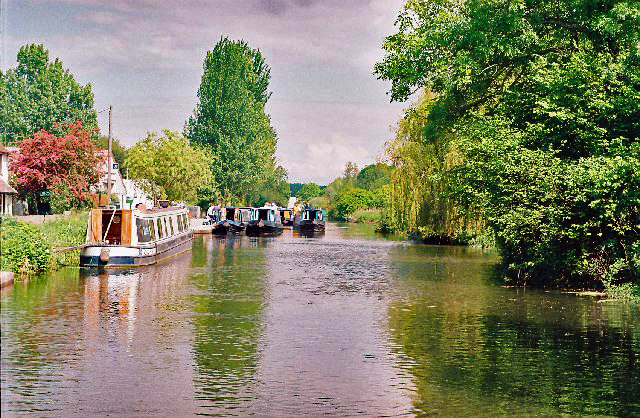
- The Kennet and Avon Canal at Aldermaston Wharf.

- Location within Berkshire
- OS grid reference: SU602671
- Unitary authority: West Berkshire
- Ceremonial county: Berkshire
- Region: South East
- Country: England
- Sovereign state: United Kingdom
- Post town: Reading
- Postcode district: RG7
- Police: Thames Valley
- Fire: Royal Berkshire
- Ambulance: South Central
- UK Parliament: Reading West and Mid Berkshire

Aldermaston Wharf is a small village centred 1.5 miles (2.4 km) north-northwest of Aldermaston (where according to the Post Office the majority of the population taken at the 2011 Census was included) in West Berkshire, England. The Kennet and Avon Canal passes through the settlement with Aldermaston Lock near the centre while the Great Western Railway passes at the northern side where Aldermaston railway station is also located. The A340 from Basingstoke passes through the village crossing the canal over a single file lift bridge and joins the A4 which runs just north of the village.

== Kennet and Avon Canal and River Kennet ==
The River Kennet was made navigable between Reading and Newbury and opened as the Kennet Navigation in 1723. The section running through Aldermaston Wharf is a canal navigation (from Frouds Lane Marina to Ufton Bridge) with the original River Kennet continuing approx 1/2 mile south of the canal. A wharf was constructed here (to the immediate east of the current lift bridge) and a trading community developed around it. In addition carpenters were required to service the locks and bridges. On completion of the Kennet and Avon Canal in 1810, local trade flourished even more with exports of timber products, malt and flour and imports of coal, groceries and manufactured goods. Canal trade continues at Aldermaston, primarily in leisure and tourism. A visitor and tea room is operated adjacent to a marina and boat hire business.

When the Great Western Railway bought the canal in the 1850s a canal spur was constructed to the railway sidings to allow transfer of goods between canal and rail. Some of this has now been infilled. Strange's Brewery was sited just south of the lock. In the late 18th century the brewery was owned by Francis Strange. The brewery was sold in 1952 and demolished.

== Housing developments ==
The village has grown significantly through new housing developments over the last 25 years. The main developments in chronological order are:

- 1995 "The Wharf" (Swan Drive and Kingfisher Close), south of the canal and west of the A340, on the site of the former Strange's Brewery
- 1998 Mallard Way, Heron Way and Lockside Court, between the canal and railway line west of the A340 on a brownfield site vacated by the Sterling Greengate cable factory (1940s to 1990)
- 2005 Watson Close, between A340 and railway line, named after the last station master
- 2007 "The Fallows" (Fallows Road), south of the canal and east of the A340
- 2015 Stowe Close, between railway line and Station Road

== Local Amenities ==
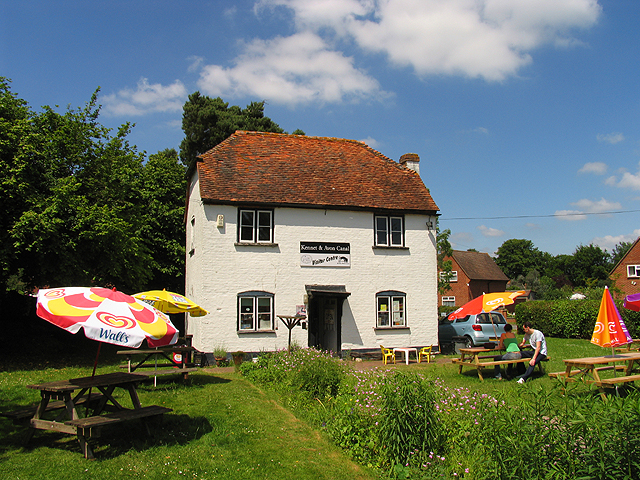
British Waterways Aldermaston Wharf Visitor Centre

- A visitor centre with a tea room is located at the canal east of the lift bridge
- A marina and boat hire business operates at the canal east of the lift bridge
- A pub, The Butt Inn, is located on the A340 at the southern end of the village
- The Steiner Waldorf school closed in 2022, it was located south east of the canal, close to the lift bridge

== Nearby places ==
Nearby are the towns of Newbury, Thatcham and Reading. Neighbouring villages are Aldermaston, Midgham, Beenham, Woolhampton and Padworth. Aldermaston Wharf falls within three civil parishes—Padworth, Aldermaston and Beenham.

A small private airfield can be found at the nearby Brimpton Airfield.
