= Aldermaston railway station =

Railway station in Berkshire, England

Coordinates: 51°24′8″N 1°8′12″W

Aldermaston
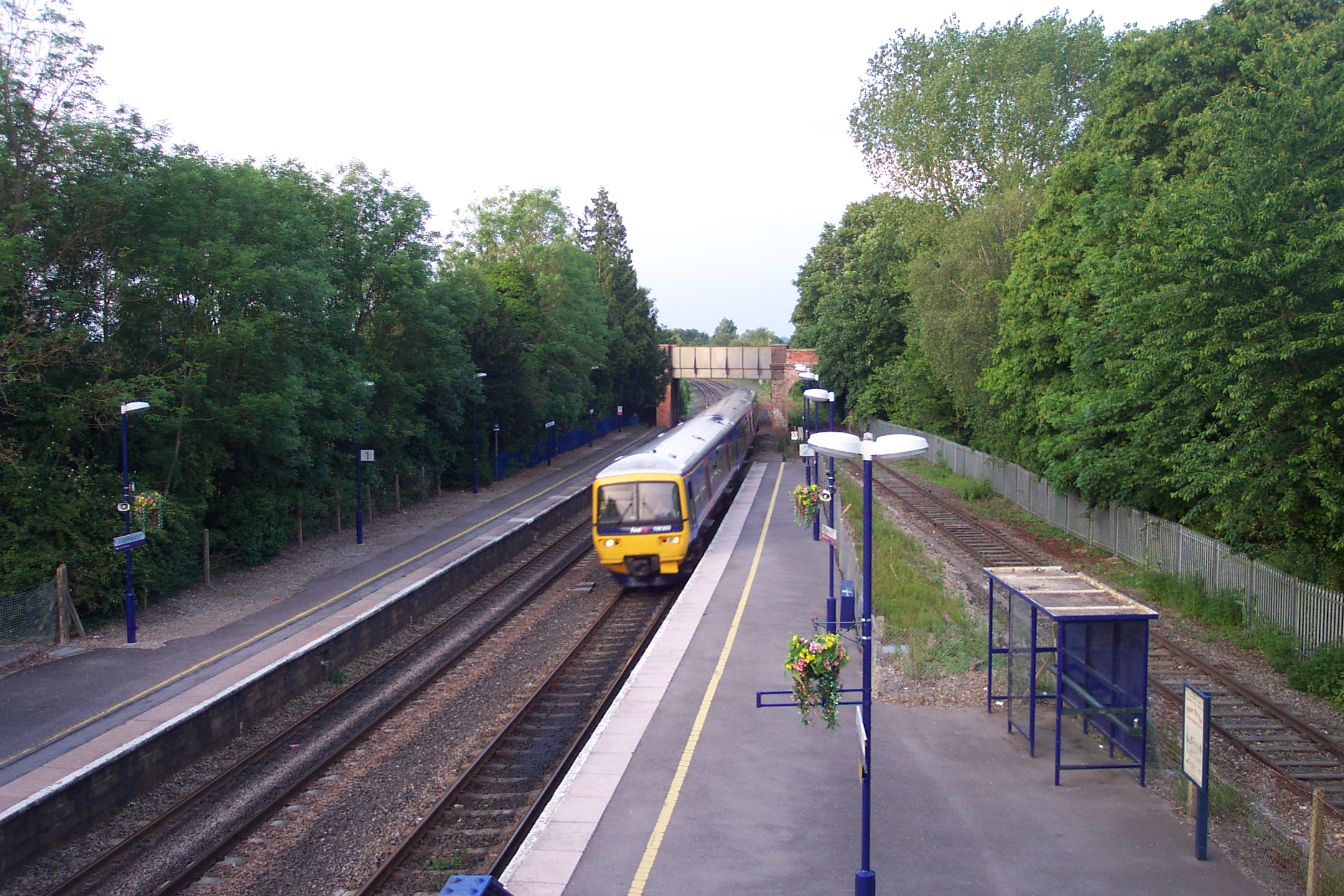
- The station from the footbridge, with a First Great Western train passing through

General information
- Location: Aldermaston Wharf, West Berkshire; England
- Grid reference: SU601673
- Managed by: Great Western Railway
- Platforms: 2

Other information
- Station code: AMT
- Classification: DfT category F1

History
- Original company: Great Western Railway
- Pre-grouping: Great Western Railway
- Post-grouping: Great Western Railway

Key dates
- 21 December 1847: opened

Passengers
- 2020/21: ▼18,622
- 2021/22: ▲45,004
- 2022/23: ▲50,602
- 2023/24: ▲57,022
- 2024/25: ▲71,290
Location
Notes
- Passenger statistics from the Office of Rail and Road

Aldermaston railway station serves the village of Aldermaston, in Berkshire, England. It is sited is at nearby Aldermaston Wharf. It lies about 2 miles (3 km) north of Aldermaston village, 44 miles 63 chains (44.79 miles, 72.08 km) from London Paddington.

== History ==
The station was built by the Berks and Hants Railway, part of the Great Western Railway, and was opened on 21 December 1847; it stayed with that company after the Grouping of 1923. The line then became part of the Western Region of British Railways upon the subsequent nationalisation of the railways.

When sectorisation was introduced, the station was served by Network SouthEast until the privatisation of British Rail.

A 10.5-mile (16.9 km) branch line connecting Aldermaston to the Didcot, Newbury and Southampton Railway (DN&SR) at Burghclere was proposed. The line was authorised by an Act of Parliament, but never built. This is because the railway finances were loaned by the London and South Western Railway, who stipulated that the DN&SR must relinquish their sole rights to run Southampton-bound services on the line and to also abandon its plans for a link at Aldermaston with the Great Western Railway. The proposed route roughly followed the Enborne Valley, passing south of Brimpton, before following the Gaily Brook and West Clere Scarp near Kingsclere on to Old Burghclere.

== Description ==
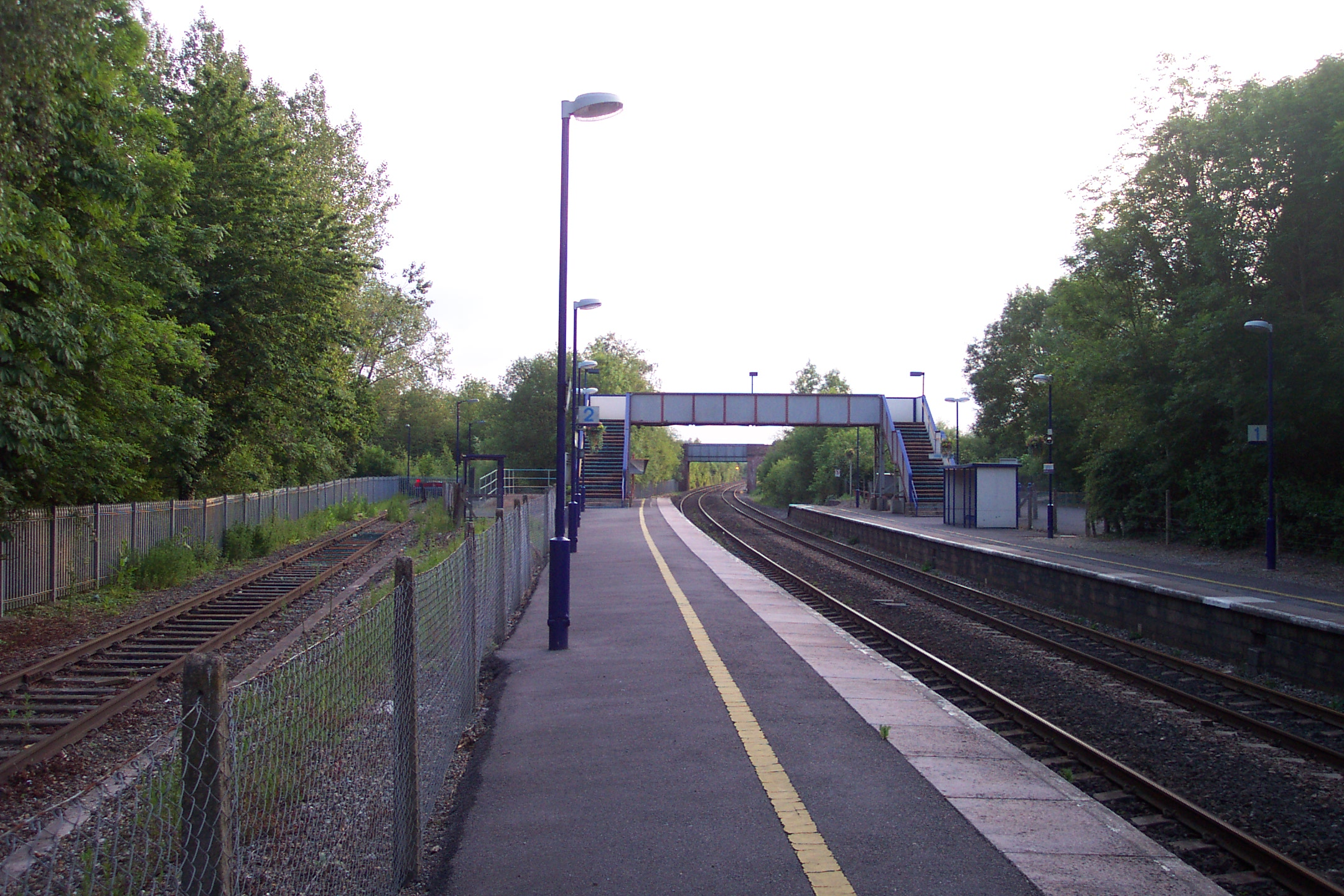
The station looking to the west, showing the footbridge and headshunt siding

Aldermaston station lies between the A4 road and the settlement of Aldermaston Wharf. It has a flanking platform on each side of the double track line. Each platform has its own independent road access and car park, together with a small shelter. The two platforms are also linked by a footbridge. The Newbury-bound platform is flanked on its offside by a siding, formerly used as a headshunt for access to a nearby freight facility. Since the rebuilding of the A340 bridge over the railway line in 2012, the siding no longer in use.

== Services ==
Great Western Railway operates services between Reading and Newbury. Trains run hourly in both directions on Mondays to Saturdays; on Sundays, service is about every 2 hours. Typical journey times are about 15 minutes to Reading and 16 minutes to Newbury.

Passengers for London Paddington must normally change trains at Reading, though there are a small number of weekday peak through trains and a regular service on Sundays.

Preceding station	National Rail	Following station
Theale	Great Western Railway; Reading - Newbury	Midgham
