= Theale railway station =

Railway station serving the village of Theale, Berkshire, England

Theale
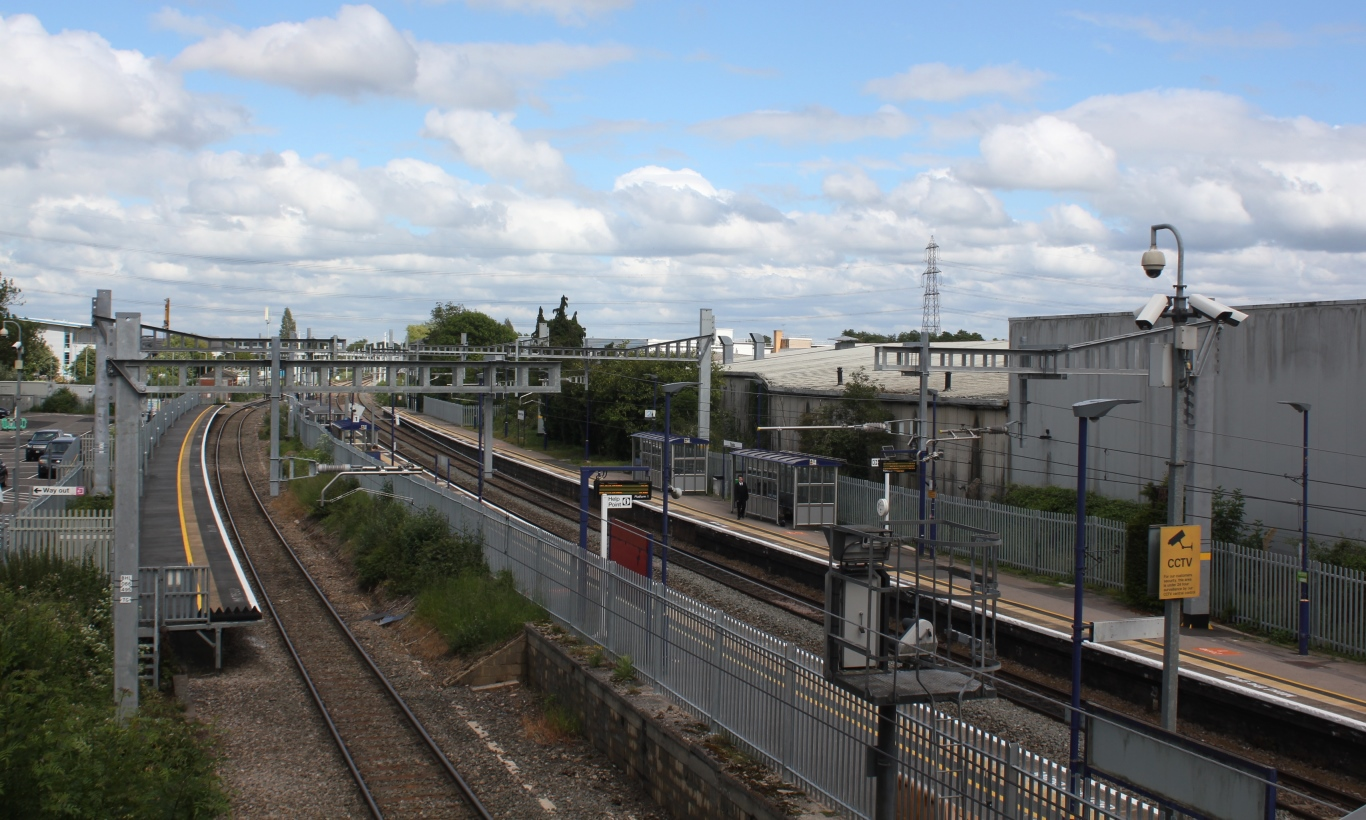
- Theale station following electrification work

General information
- Location: Theale, West Berkshire; England
- Coordinates: 51.433°N 1.075°W
- Grid reference: SU644708
- Managed by: Great Western Railway
- Platforms: 3

Other information
- Station code: THE
- Classification: DfT category E

History
- Opened: 21 December 1847
- Original company: Great Western Railway
- Post-grouping: Great Western Railway

Passengers
- 2020/21: ▼73,190
- 2021/22: ▲0.214 million
- 2022/23: ▲0.283 million
- 2023/24: ▲0.323 million
- 2024/25: ▲0.391 million
Location
Notes
- Passenger statistics from the Office of Rail and Road

Theale railway station serves the village of Theale, England. It is 41 miles 22 chains (41.28 miles, 66.43 km) measured from London Paddington.

The station is served by Great Western Railway local services between Reading and Newbury, limited semi-fast peak services between Bedwyn and London and a limited semi-fast service between London and Westbury, Taunton, Frome, Penzance and Exeter St Davids.

== History ==
The railway station was opened on 21 December 1847 on the first portion of what would become the Berks and Hants Line between Reading and Hungerford.

== Layout ==
Theale has three platforms. Platforms 1 and 2 serve the up and down main line, and platform 3 is a former goods loop upgraded to passenger standards in 2011.

Plans to upgrade facilities at the station were announced in 2013 by Network Rail and GWR (including new lifts, a new pedestrian entrance and accessible footbridge, extra car parking, and a new ticket office), but the £2.9 million project has been delayed several times and by summer 2016 was running more than three years behind schedule. The upgrade project was resumed in 2021. The accessible footbridge and lifts were completed in January 2025.

== Services ==
The typical off-peak service at the station in trains per hour is:

- 1 tph to London Paddington
- 1 tph to Reading
- 2 tph to Newbury

Preceding station	National Rail	Following station
Reading West	Great Western Railway Reading-Newbury	Aldermaston
Reading	Great Western Railway Paddington-Newbury	Thatcham
