= Hosehill Lake =

Local nature reserve in Berkshire, England

Coordinates: 51°25′19″N 1°04′03″W

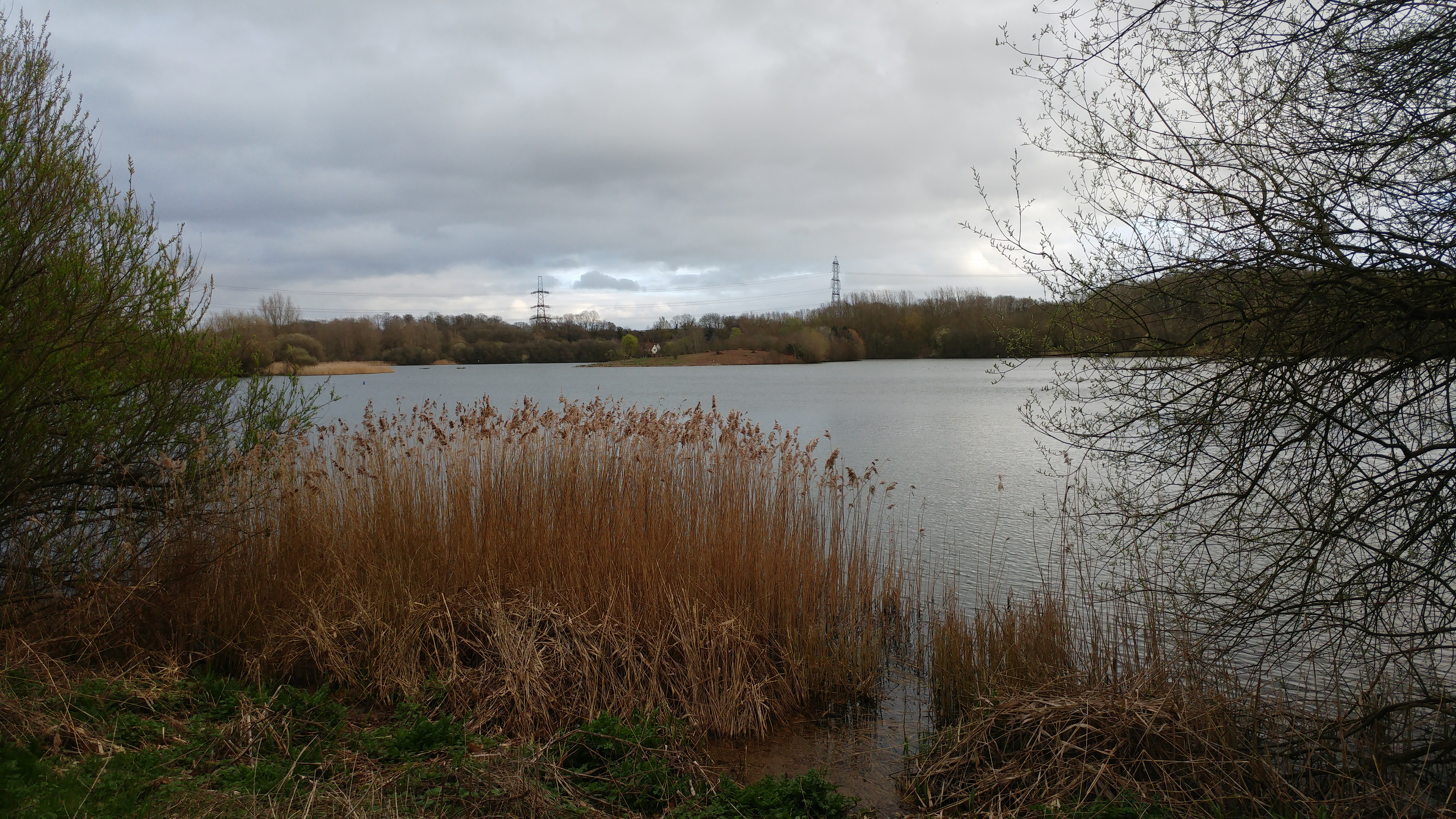
- Interactive map of Hosehill Lake
- Type: Local Nature Reserve
- Location: Reading, Berkshire
- OS grid: SU 649 696
- Area: 23.6 hectares (58 acres)
- Manager: Berkshire, Buckinghamshire and Oxfordshire Wildlife Trust

Hosehill Lake is a 23.6-hectare (58-acre) Local Nature Reserve west of Reading in Berkshire. It is owned by West Berkshire Council and managed by the Berkshire, Buckinghamshire and Oxfordshire Wildlife Trust.

== Geography and site ==
To the east and south of the lake is meadowland. The eastern meadow is cut and then grazed by wild Exmoor ponies for a short period in the spring and autumn, and the south meadow is a butterfly meadow.

The site features a one-mile circular walk around the lake.

== History ==
Hosehill Lake was given its nature reserve status in 1997 by Newbury District Council. Since it became a nature reserve, an island has been created in the lake, along with Tern Rafts, a Sand Martin Bank and the Butterfly Meadow.

In 2013 the management of the nature reserve was transferred from West Berkshire Council to the Berkshire, Buckinghamshire and Oxfordshire Wildlife Trust.

== Fauna ==
The site has seen 168 different bird species. Some of the more common birds seen are listed here:

=== Birds ===
- Little ringed plover
- Great crested grebe
- Bittern
- Gadwall
- Wigeon
- Sand martin
- House martin
- Swallow
- Common whitethroat
- Chiffchaff
- Hobby
- Common tern
- Black-headed Gull
- Pochard
- Goldeneye
- Goosander
- Northern shoveler
