= A340 road =

Road in the south of England

A340

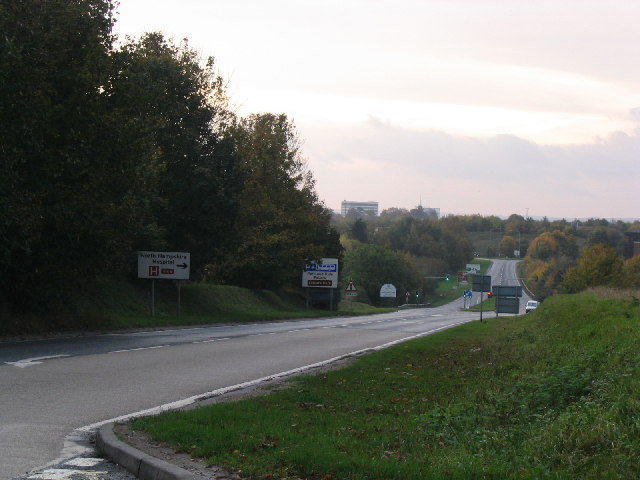

Route information
- Length: 17 mi (27 km)

Major junctions
- South end: Basingstoke; 51.2555°N 1.1040°W
- A339; A33; A4 A329
- North end: Pangbourne; 51.4837°N 1.0875°W

Location
- Country: United Kingdom

Road network
- Roads in the United Kingdom; Motorways; A and B road zones
← A339	→ A341

The A340 is a major road in the south of England, connecting Basingstoke in Hampshire to Pangbourne in Berkshire. Portions of the road are known as the Aldermaston Road, Tadley Hill, Basingstoke Road, and Tidmarsh Road.

== Route ==
Starting in the south of Basingstoke in Hampshire, it runs west, forming the western side of the Basingstoke ringroad, before swinging north to Tadley and then enters Berkshire. It passes the gates of the Atomic Weapons Establishment at Aldermaston, before passing through the village of Aldermaston itself and then joining the A4 at Aldermaston Wharf. After approximately 2.5 miles (4.0 km) north-east, the A340 runs further north to Pangbourne, to the west of Reading. This section of the road is thought to follow the Roman road from Calleva Atrebatum (about 7 miles (11 km) to the south).

== See also ==
- Great Britain road numbering scheme
