= Beansheaf Farm =

Coordinates: 51°26′23″N 1°02′41″W

- Location within Berkshire
- OS grid reference: SU666716
- Civil parish: Holybrook
- Unitary authority: West Berkshire
- Ceremonial county: Berkshire
- Region: South East
- Country: England
- Sovereign state: United Kingdom
- Post town: READING
- Postcode district: RG31
- Dialling code: 0118
- Police: Thames Valley
- Fire: Royal Berkshire
- Ambulance: South Central
- UK Parliament: Reading West and Mid Berkshire

Beansheaf Farm, or Beansheaf, is a housing estate near Reading in West Berkshire, within the county of Berkshire, England. It lies south of the A4 Bath Road and approximately 4 miles (6.4 km) south-west of Reading.

== Local government ==
Beansheaf Farm is outside the boundaries of the Borough of Reading. It forms part of the civil parish of Holybrook, in the neighbouring unitary authority of West Berkshire.
