= Reading Borough Council elections =

Local government elections in Berkshire, England

Reading Borough Council is the council for the unitary authority of Reading in Berkshire, England. Until 1 April 1998 it was a non-metropolitan district. Since the last boundary changes in 2022 the council has comprised 48 councillors representing 16 wards, with each ward electing three councillors. Elections are held three years out of every four, with a third of the council (one councillor for each ward) being elected each time for a four-year term.

== Council elections ==
Composition of the council
Year	Conservative	Labour	Liberal Democrats (Note: Includes totals for the predecessors of the Liberal Democrats, the Liberal Party and SDP (both of which participated in the Alliance).)	Green (Note: Includes totals for the predecessors of the Green Party of England and Wales, the Ecology Party and Green Party UK.)	Independents & Others	Council control after election
Local government reorganisation; council established (46 seats)
1973	16	16	14	–	0	No overall control
1976	21	14	11	0	0	No overall control
1979	22	16	11	0	0	No overall control
New ward boundaries (45 seats)
1983	26	13	6	0	0	Conservative
1984	23	17	5	0	0	Conservative
1986	18	22	5	0	0	No overall control
1987	16	24	5	0	0	Labour
1988	15	25	5	0	0	Labour
1990	13	27	5	0	0	Labour
1991	12	29	4	0	0	Labour
1992	11	29	4	0	1	Labour
1994	12	28	5	0	0	Labour
1995	8	32	5	0	0	Labour
1996	4	35	6	0	0	Labour
1998	3	36	6	0	0	Labour
1999	3	36	6	0	0	Labour
2000	3	36	6	0	0	Labour
2001	3	36	6	0	0	Labour
2002	3	36	6	0	0	Labour
2003	4	35	6	0	0	Labour
New ward boundaries (46 seats)
2004	6	35	5	0	0	Labour
2006	8	32	6	0	0	Labour
2007	13	25	8	0	0	Labour
2008	18	20	8	0	0	No overall control
2010	17	19	9	1	0	No overall control
2011	16	22	5	2	1	No overall control
2012	12	26	4	3	1	Labour
2014	10	31	2	3	0	Labour
2015	10	31	2	3	0	Labour
2016	10	31	2	3	0	Labour
2018	12	30	1	3	0	Labour
2019	10	30	2	4	0	Labour
2021	10	29	2	5	0	Labour
New ward boundaries (48 seats)
2022	6	32	3	7	0	Labour
2023	5	32	3	7	1	Labour
2024	4	32	3	8	1	Labour
2026	5	29	3	11	0	Labour

== Borough result maps ==
2004 results map

2006 results map

2007 results map

2008 results map

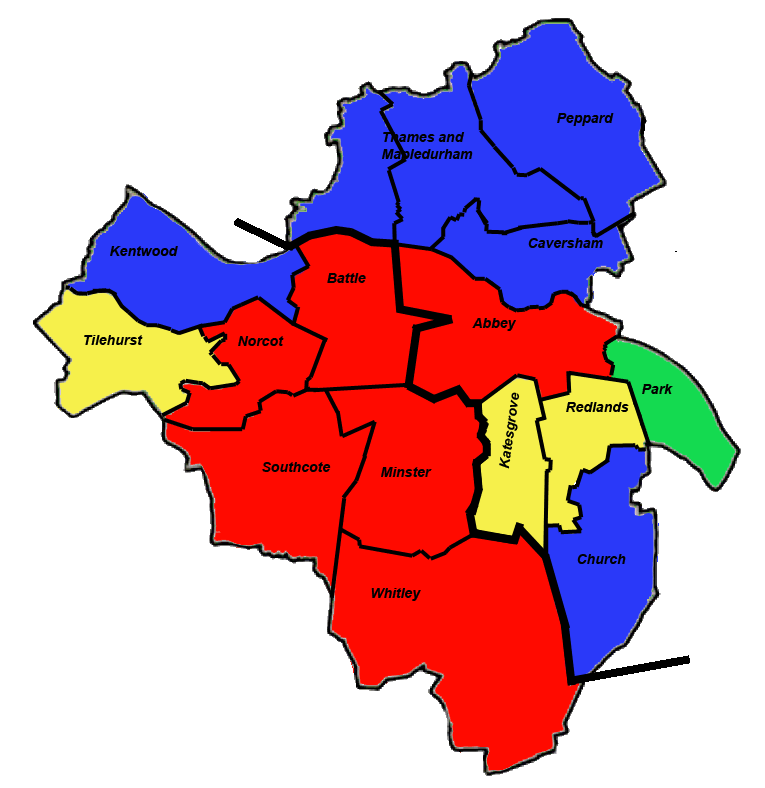
2010 results map

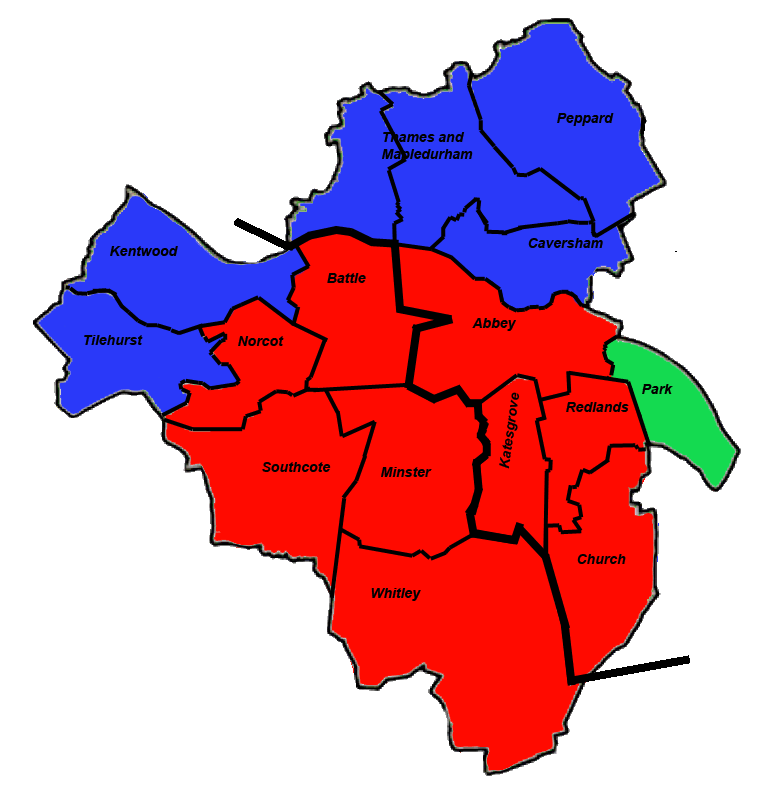
2011 results map

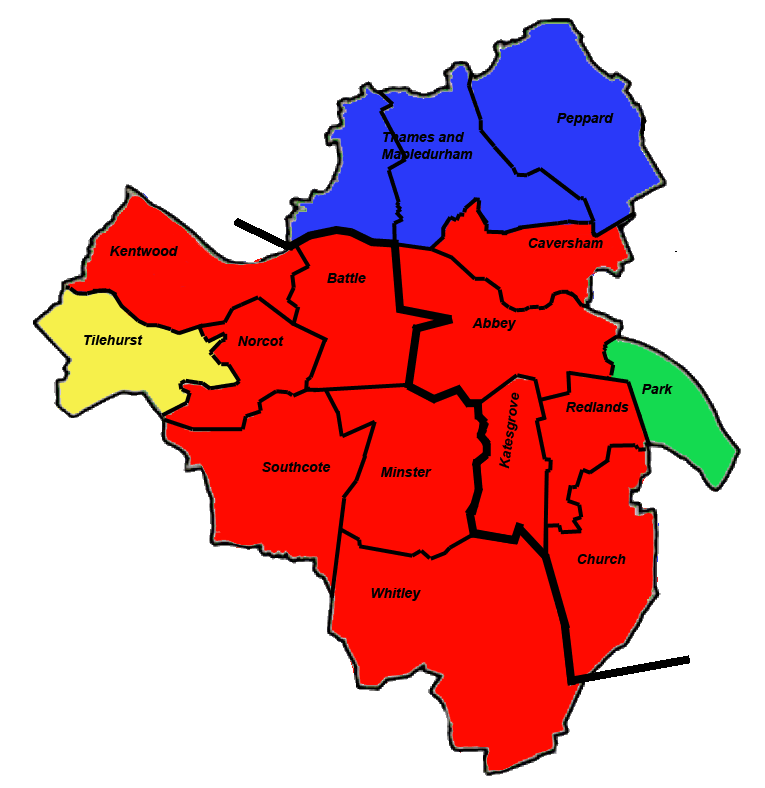
2012 results map

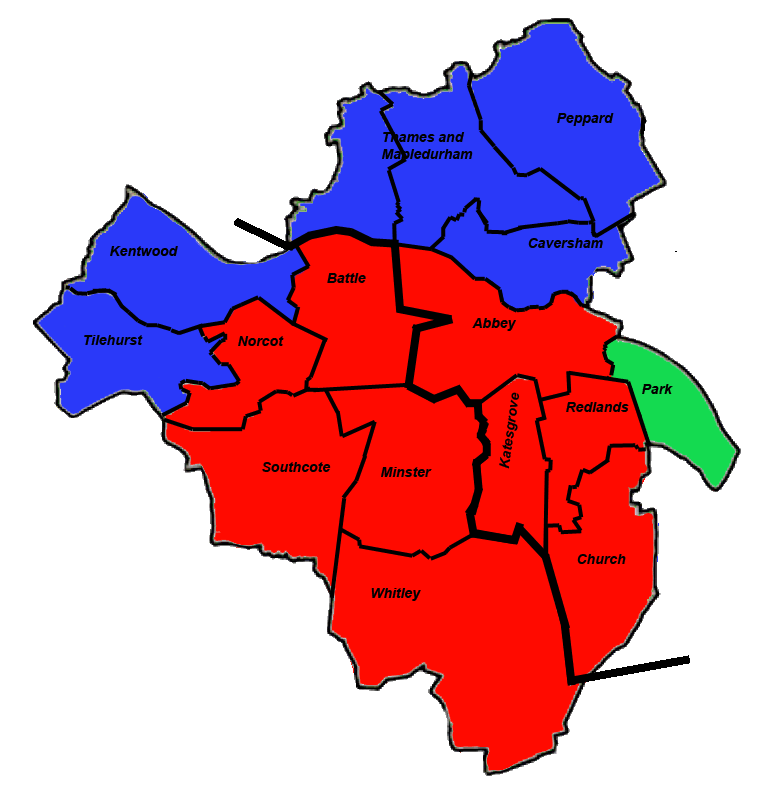
2014 results map

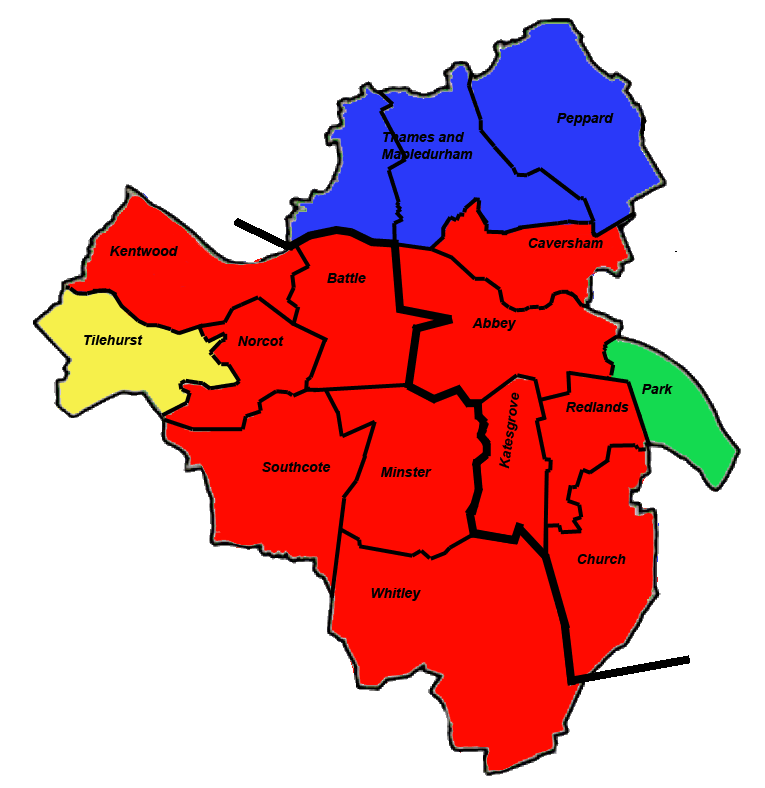
2015 results map

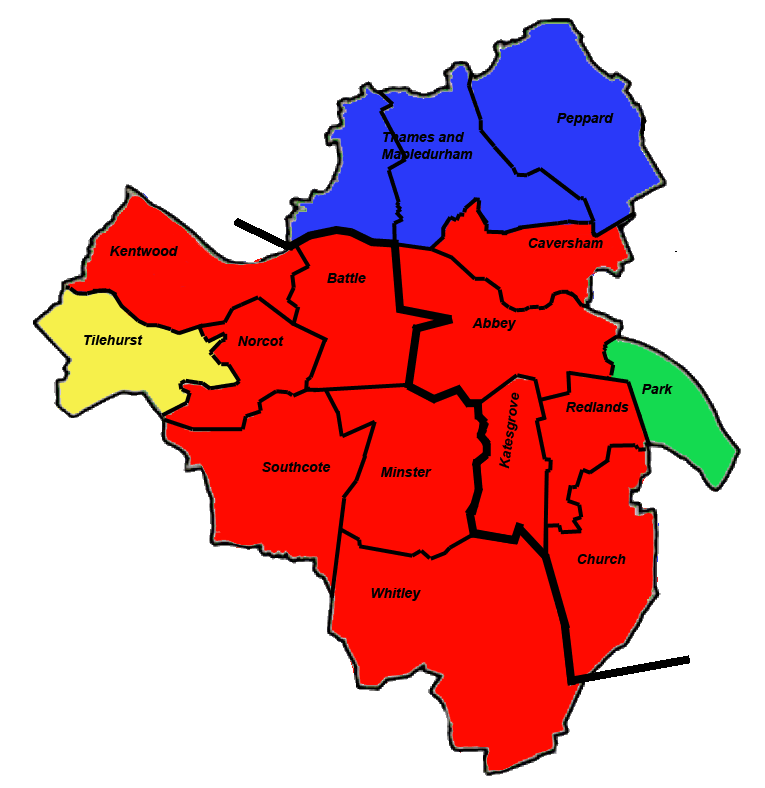
2016 results map

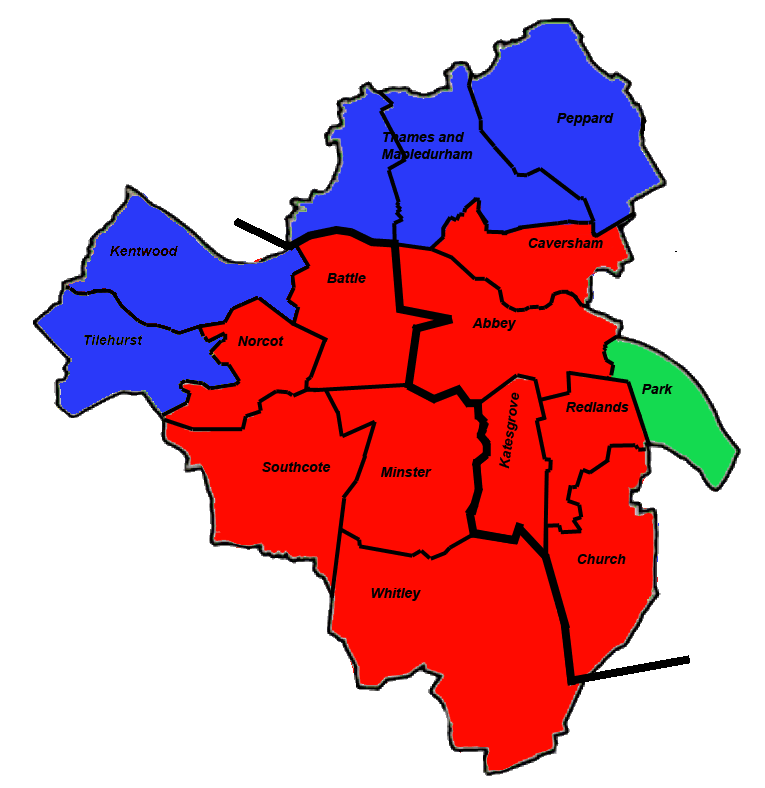
2018 results map

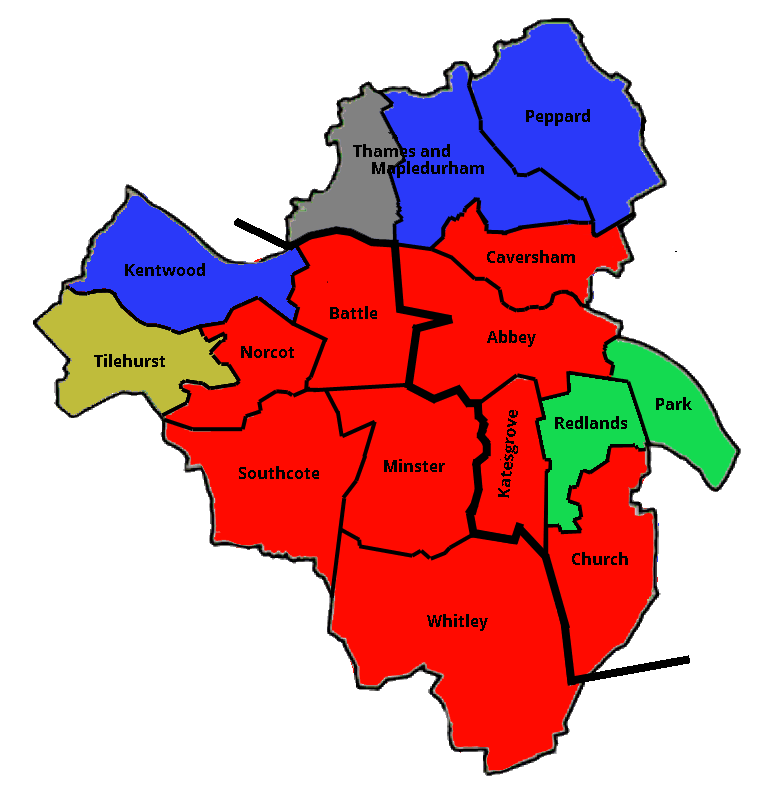
2019 results map

2021 results map

2022 results map

2023 results map

2024 results map

2026 results map

== By-election results ==
By-elections are listed on the pages of the last council-wide election prior to the by-election, with the exception of the 1977 by-election below which was due to a boundary change and increase in number of councillors rather than needing to fill a vacancy on the council.

By-election	Date	Incumbent party	Winning party
Whitley	11 December 1975	Labour	Labour
Christchurch	31 March 1977	Labour	Conservative
Thames	21 April 1977	Conservative	Conservative
Thames	22 September 1977	Conservative	Conservative
Minster	1 December 1977	Conservative	Conservative
Thames	24 January 1980	Conservative	Conservative
Christchurch	7 May 1981	Labour	Labour
Redlands	7 May 1981	Conservative	Conservative
Abbey	24 September 1981	Labour	Labour
Church	6 December 1984	Labour	Labour
Battle	25 July 1985	Labour	Labour
Peppard	11 September 1986	Conservative	Liberal
Katesgrove	14 July 1988	Labour	Labour
Battle	17 November 1988	Labour	Labour
Abbey	4 May 1989	Labour	Labour
Park	6 May 1993	Labour	Labour
Battle	5 May 1994	Labour	Labour
Kentwood	28 July 1994	Liberal Democrats	Labour
Redlands	4 May 1995	Labour	Labour
Redlands	2 May 1996	Labour	Labour
Abbey	6 May 1999	Labour	Labour
Church	15 June 2000	Labour	Labour
Redlands	2 May 2002	Labour	Labour
Southcote	4 May 2006	Labour	Labour
Thames	4 May 2006	Conservative	Conservative
Tilehurst	16 November 2006	Liberal Democrats	Liberal Democrats
Church	3 May 2007	Labour	Conservative
Southcote	3 May 2007	Labour	Labour
Park	22 May 2014	Green	Green
Southcote	24 July 2014	Labour	Labour
Southcote	21 July 2016	Labour	Labour
Kentwood	12 December 2019	Conservative	Conservative
Norcot	3 August 2023	Labour	Labour

=== Thames by-election April 1977 ===
On 1 April 1977 the borough was enlarged by the addition of parts of the parishes of Eye and Dunsden, Kidmore End and Mapledurham, all from South Oxfordshire. The number of councillors on Reading Borough Council was increased from 46 to 49 as a result. The two South Oxfordshire district councillors representing much of the transferred area automatically became Reading borough councillors without needing to be re-elected, representing a new ward of Caversham Park. These two were Geoff Lowe and Harold Stoddart, both Liberals (although Lowe later defected to the Conservatives in 1978). Reading's existing Thames and Caversham wards were also enlarged, and the increase in the size of Thames ward justified a fifth councillor being elected for that ward, for which a by-election was held on 21 April 1977, which was won by the Conservatives. After the by-election and two transfers, the balance of the council was 23 Conservatives, 13 Labour and 13 Liberals.

Thames By-Election 21 April 1977
Party	Candidate	Votes	%	±%
Conservative	Brian Fowles	2,619	75.3	
Liberal	Katherine Gwinnell	485	13.9	
Labour	Pat Mander	373	10.7	
Majority		2,134	61.4	
Turnout		3,477	33	
Conservative win (new seat)				
