= 2014 Reading Borough Council election =

2014 UK local government election

- 22 May 2014

16 out of 46 seats to Reading Borough Council 24 seats needed for a majority
- Turnout: 33.3% ▲4.3pp
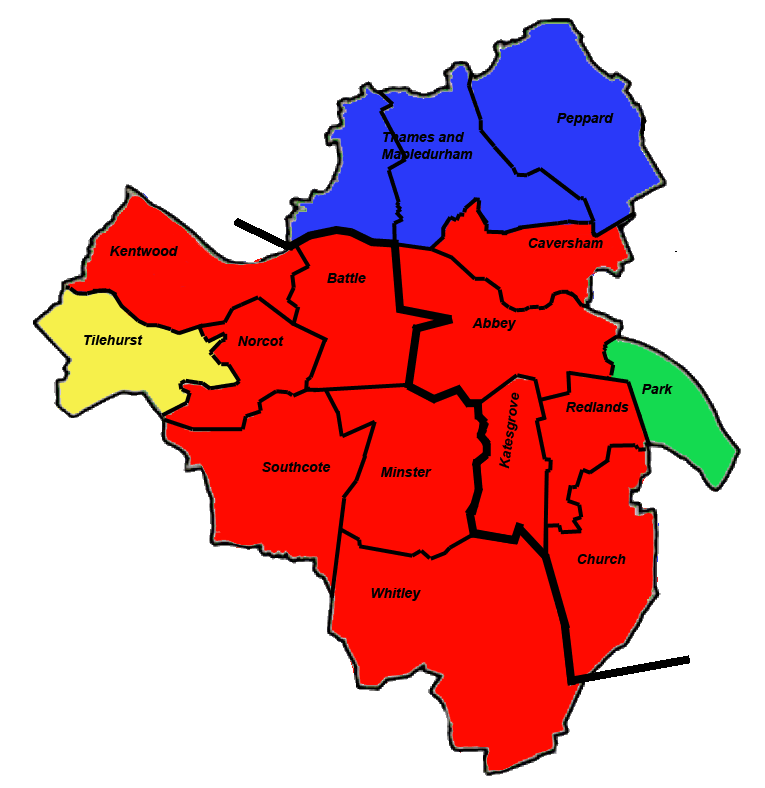
- Winner of each seat at the 2014 Reading Borough Council election

Elections to Reading Borough Council took place on 22 May 2014, with 15 council seats up for election. The Labour Party repeated their wins of 2012 gaining Church, Katesgrove, Redlands, Kentwood and Caversham wards, giving them a total of 31 Councillors. The Conservative Party lost three seats but gained Peppard ward from an independent. The Liberal Democrats lost two seats but held Tilehurst ward. The Green Party held Park ward including a by-election caused by the resignation of one of their Councillors. UKIP stood a record number of candidates at the election but failed to gain any council seats.

The elections were held on the same day as the 2014 European Elections.

After the election, the composition of the council was:

Party	Seats	+/-
Labour	31	+5
Conservative	10	-2
Green Party	3	0
Liberal Democrats	2	-2
Independent	0	-1
Labour hold		

== Election result ==
Reading Borough Council Election, 2014
Party	Seats	Gains	Losses	Net gain/loss	Seats %	Votes %	Votes	+/−
Labour	11	+5	0	+5	70%	39.0%	15,024	-6.0%
Conservative	2	+1	-3	-2	12%	25.5%	9,826	-2.3%
Green	2	0	0	0	12%	13.6%	5,243	+2.5%
UKIP	0	0	0	0	0%	8.9%	3,446	+8.3%
Liberal Democrats	1	0	-2	-2	6%	8.9%	3,414	-1.1%
Independent	0	0	-1	-1	0%	3.9%	1,487	+0.2%
The Roman Party Ave!	0	0	0	0	0%	0.1%	43	0%
TUSC	0	0	0	0	0%	0.1%	23	New

Note: The figures above for votes and vote percentages do not include the Park by-election.

== Ward results ==
Abbey Ward
Party	Candidate	Votes	%	±%
Labour	Bet Tickner	1,195	49%	−9.7%
Conservative	Laurence Taylor	475	19.4%	+1.3%
Green	Richard Black	315	12.9%	+1.2%
UKIP	Stephen George	236	9.6%	+9.6%
Liberal Democrats	James Moore	218	8.9%	+2.0%
Majority		720	29.5%	−10.7%
Turnout		2,439	25%	+5.0%
Labour hold		Swing	-6.0%	

Battle Ward
Party	Candidate	Votes	%	±%
Labour	Sarah Hacker	1,255	57.0%	+3.0%
Conservative	Imraan Ishtiaq	442	20.0%	−7.7%
Green	Alan Lockey	293	13.3%	+3.3%
Liberal Democrats	Glenn Goodall	167	7.5%	+1.9%
The Roman Party Ave!	Jean-Louis Pascual	43	1.9%	−0.3%
Majority		813	36.9%	10.7%
Turnout		2,220	28%	+3.0%
Labour hold		Swing	+5.3%	

Caversham Ward
Party	Candidate	Votes	%	±%
Labour	Rachael Chrisp	1,081	37.0%	−12.0%
Conservative	Geoff Poland	894	30.6%	−3.6%
Green	Jenny Hicks	362	12.3%	+2.0%
UKIP	Michael Diamond	348	11.9%	+11.9%
Liberal Democrats	Christopher Burden	212	7.2%	+0.7%
TUSC	Silvia Vousden	23	0.7%	+0.7%
Majority		187	6.4%	−7.8%
Turnout		2920	39%	+4.0%
Labour gain from Conservative		Swing	-4.2%	

Church Ward
Party	Candidate	Votes	%	±%
Labour	Ashley Pearce	919	41.3%	−9.2%
Conservative	Paul Carnell	577	25.9%	−8.4%
UKIP	Ann Zebedee	380	17.1%	+17.1%
Green	Vivienne Johnson	238	10.7%	+3.2%
Liberal Democrats	Margaret McNeill	108	4.8%	+0.2%
Majority		342	15.3%	−0.8%
Turnout		2,222	26%	+1.0%
Labour gain from Conservative		Swing	-0.4%	

Katesgrove Ward
Party	Candidate	Votes	%	±%
Labour	Sophia James	992	48.5%	−7.4%
Conservative	Emma Warman	334	16.3%	+1.5%
Green	Louise Keane	278	13.6%	+3.8%
UKIP	John Dearing	248	12.1%	+12.1%
Liberal Democrats	Peter Kinsley	191	9.3%	−6.8%
Majority		658	32.2%	−7.5%
Turnout		2,043	28%	+5.0%
Labour gain from Liberal Democrats		Swing	-4.4%	

Kentwood Ward
Party	Candidate	Votes	%	±%
Labour	Glenn Dennis	989	35.9%	−10.9%
Conservative	Tom Steele	847	30.8%	−4.6%
UKIP	Howard Thomas	601	21.8%	+21.8%
Green	Ruth Shaffrey	178	6.4%	0.0%
Liberal Democrats	Jon Walls	135	4.9%	−0.5%
Majority		142	5.1%	−6.2%
Turnout		2,750	37%	+7.0%
Labour gain from Conservative		Swing	-3.1%	

Minster Ward
Party	Candidate	Votes	%	±%
Labour	Marian Livingston	1,090	44.3%	−14.9%
Conservative	Katie Black	664	27.0%	+0.7%
UKIP	Patrick Dillon	351	14.2%	+14.2%
Green	Hazel Murphy	226	10.8%	+3.7%
Liberal Democrats	Jonathan Fanti	128	5.2%	−2.0%
Majority		426	17.3%	−15.5%
Turnout		2,459	32%	+3.0%
Labour hold		Swing	-7.8%	

Norcot Ward
Party	Candidate	Votes	%	±%
Labour	Debs Absolom	1,368	57.0%	−11.8%
Conservative	Clare Vose	573	23.9%	+4.0%
Green	David James Patterson	289	12.0%	+6.2%
Liberal Democrats	Georgina Hughes	169	7.0%	−0.2%
Majority		795	33.1%	−15.7%
Turnout		2,399	32%	+5.0%
Labour hold		Swing	-7.9%	

Park Ward
Party	Candidate	Votes	%	±%
Green	Rob White	1,669	53.3%	+6.9%
Labour	Anrish Kaur	936	29.9%	−10.9%
Conservative	Mohammad Basharat	320	10.2%	−0.2%
UKIP	Anne Armstrong	119	3.8%	+3.8%
Liberal Democrats	Rebecca Rye	84	2.6%	+0.6%
Majority		733	23.4%	+17.8%
Turnout		3,128	43%	+8.0%
Green hold		Swing	+8.9%	

Park Ward By-Election
Party	Candidate	Votes	%	±%
Green	Josh Williams	1,569	51.1%	+4.7%
Labour	Matthew Lawrence	1,015	33.0%	−7.8%
Conservative	Shanaz Akhtar	391	12.7%	+2.3%
Liberal Democrats	Francis Jakeman	93	3.0%	+1.0%
Majority		554	18.0%	+12.4%
Turnout		3,068	43%	+8.0%
Green hold		Swing	+6.3	

Peppard Ward
Party	Candidate	Votes	%	±%
Conservative	Simon Robinson	1,027	31.8%	−6.6%
Independent	Mark Ralph	886	27.5%	−0.3%
Labour	Natalie Platts	509	15.8%	+0.5%
UKIP	John Knight	460	14.2%	+14.2%
Green	Kate Day	186	5.7%	−1.7%
Liberal Democrats	Jenny Woods	152	4.7%	−5.7%
Majority		141	4.3%	−6.3%
Turnout		3,220	42%	+5.0%
Conservative gain from Independent		Swing	-3.1%	

Redlands Ward
Party	Candidate	Votes	%	±%
Labour	David Absolom	1,047	44.9%	−6.9%
Conservative	Helen Hopper	430	18.4%	+4.7%
Liberal Democrats	Kirsten Bayes	341	14.6%	−6.7%
Green	Kizzi Murtagh	337	14.4%	+1.8%
UKIP	Robert Derek Allen	173	7.4%	+7.4%
Majority		617	26.5%	−3.9%
Turnout		2,328	31%	+5.0%
Labour gain from Liberal Democrats		Swing	-5.8%	

Southcote Ward
Party	Candidate	Votes	%	±%
Labour	John Ennis	1,286	57.5%	−7.5%
Conservative	Ellis Wiggins	626	28.0%	+5.2%
Green	Doug Cresswell	213	9.5%	+4.2%
Liberal Democrats	Madeline Adams	110	4.9%	−1.8%
Majority		660	29.5%	−12.7%
Turnout		2,235	34%	+2.0%
Labour hold		Swing	-6.3%	

Thames Ward
Party	Candidate	Votes	%	±%
Conservative	David Stevens	1,486	45.5%	+0.6%
Labour	Richard Stainthorp	766	23.4%	+1.2%
Green	Sarah McNamara	385	11.8%	+0.8%
Independent	John Dickson	332	10.1%	−1.3%
Liberal Democrats	Guy William Gipps Penman	293	8.9%	−1.1%
Majority		720	22.0%	−0.7%
Turnout		3,262	44%	+6.0%
Conservative hold		Swing	-0.3%	

Tilehurst Ward
Party	Candidate	Votes	%	±%
Liberal Democrats	Ricky Duveen	1,013	37.2%	−1.4%
Conservative	Robert Vickers	643	23.6%	−2.4%
UKIP	William Stewart Graham MacPhee	530	19.4%	+10.0%
Labour	Haji Banaras	429	15.7%	−6.2%
Green	Miriam Kennet	107	3.9%	+0.2%
Majority		370	13.5%	+0.9%
Turnout		2,722	38%	+6.0%
Liberal Democrats hold		Swing	-1.9%	

Whitley Ward
Party	Candidate	Votes	%	±%
Labour	Rachel Eden	1,162	53.2%	−11.2%
Conservative	Nick Brown	488	22.3%	+4.4%
Independent	Jamie Steven Wake	269	12.3%	+7.7%
Green	Keith Martin Johnson	169	7.7%	+3.9%
Liberal Democrats	Janel Blatter	93	4.2%	+1.0%
Majority		674	30.9%	−15.6%
Turnout		2,181	26.0%	+4.0%
Labour hold		Swing	-7.8%	

== By-elections between 2014 and 2015 ==
Southcote by-election 24 July 2014
Party	Candidate	Votes	%	±%
Labour	Matthew Lawrence	1019	59.8	+2.3
Conservative	Ellis Wiggins	340	20.0	−8.0
UKIP	Ann Zebedee	226	13.3	+13.3
Green	Alan Lockey	69	4.1	−5.4
Liberal Democrats	Margaret McNeill	49	2.9	−2.0
Majority		679	39.9	
Turnout		1,703		
Labour hold		Swing		
