= 2012 Reading Borough Council election =

2012 UK local government election

- 3 May 2012

16 out of 46 seats to Reading Borough Council 24 seats needed for a majority
- Turnout: 29.0% ▼10.9pp
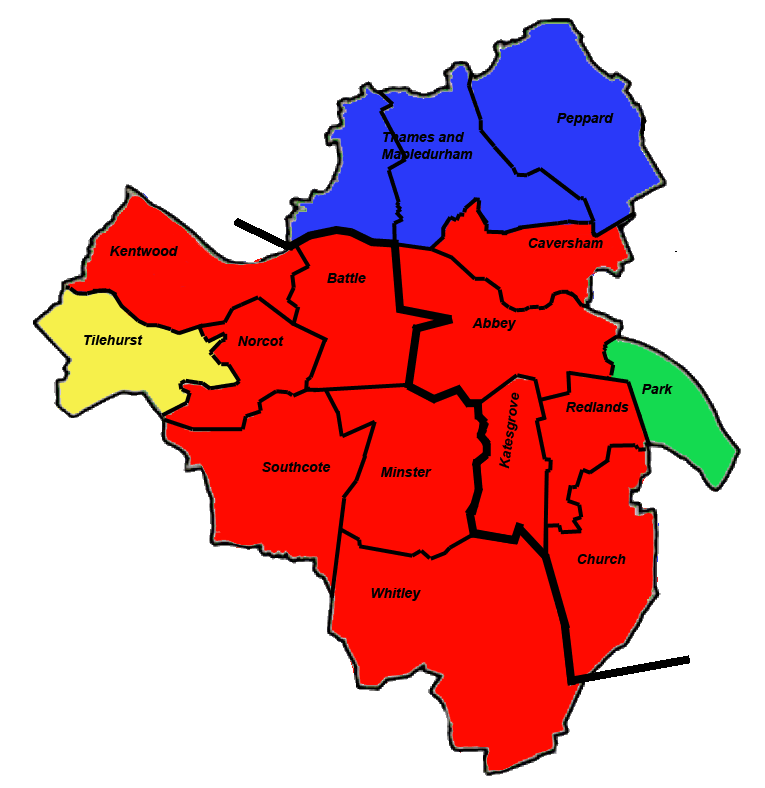
- Winner of each seat at the 2012 Reading Borough Council election

Elections to Reading Borough Council took place on 3 May 2012, with 16 council seats up for election. The Labour Party gained Church, Katesgrove, Redlands, Kentwood and Caversham wards, giving them a working majority and control of the council. The Conservative Party lost three seats but gained Peppard ward from an independent. The Liberal Democrats lost two seats but held Tilehurst ward, a seat they had lost the previous year to the Conservative Party. The Green Party gained Park ward from Labour but failed to make gains elsewhere seeing their percentage of the borough-wide vote fall slightly.

After the election, the composition of the council was:

Party	Seats	+/-
Labour	26	+4
Conservative	12	-2
Liberal Democrats	4	-2
Green Party	3	+1
Independent	1	-1
Labour gain from No overall control		

== Election result ==
Reading Borough Council election, 2012
Party	Seats	Gains	Losses	Net gain/loss	Seats %	Votes %	Votes	+/−
Labour	11	5	1	+4	68.8%	45.0%	15452	+5.1%
Conservative	3	1	3	-2	18.8%	27.8%	9492	-6.3%
Green	1	1	0	+1	6.3%	11.1%	3787	-0.1%
Liberal Democrats	1	0	2	-2	6.3%	10.0%	3406	-2.8%
Independent	0	0	1	-1	0%	3.7%	1277	+3.6%
Common Sense	0	0	0	0	0%	1.1%	391	-0.7%
UKIP	0	0	0	0	0%	0.6%	220	+0.6%
The Roman Party Ave!	0	0	0	0	0%	0.1%	42	0%

== Ward results ==
Abbey Ward
Party	Candidate	Votes	%	±%
Labour	Tony Page	1,140	58.3%	+11.6%
Conservative	Alex Coleman	354	18.1%	−7.1%
Green	Hazel Mary Murphy	230	11.7%	+1.2%
Liberal Democrats	Kirsten Ruth Bayes	135	6.9%	−8.7%
Common Sense	Howard Thomas	87	4.4%	+0.1%
Majority		786	40.2%	
Turnout		1,953	20.0%	
Labour hold		Swing	+9.3%	

Battle Ward
Party	Candidate	Votes	%	±%
Labour	Gul Khan	1,015	54.0%	+0.9%
Conservative	Imraan Ishtiaq	522	27.7%	+1.0%
Green	Alan Edward Lockey	188	10.0%	+3.0%
Liberal Democrats	Mark David Edward Whiley	106	5.6%	−3.3%
The Roman Party Ave!	Jean-Louis Pascual	42	2.2%	+1.0%
Majority		493	26.3%	
Turnout		1,879	25%	
Labour hold		Swing	-0.1%	

Caversham Ward
Party	Candidate	Votes	%	±%
Labour Co-op	Richard Davies	1,258	49.0%	+17.6%
Conservative	David Luckett	880	34.2%	−8.6%
Green	Jenny Hicks	265	10.3%	−3.8%
Liberal Democrats	Jenny Claire Woods	168	6.5%	−5.2%
Majority		378	14.8%	
Turnout		2,535	35.0%	
Labour Co-op gain from Conservative		Swing	+13.1%	

Church Ward
Party	Candidate	Votes	%	±%
Labour	Eileen McElligott	1,029	50.5%	+5.4%
Conservative	Azam Janjua	700	34.3%	+1.2%
Green	Vivienne Joyce Johnson	134	6.5%	−0.5%
Liberal Democrats	Annette Hendry	94	4.6%	−2.0%
Common Sense	Kim Maysh	79	3.8%	−4.3%
Majority		329	16.2%	
Turnout		2,036	25.0%	
Labour gain from Conservative		Swing	+4.2%	

Katesgrove Ward
Party	Candidate	Votes	%	±%
Labour	Rose Williams	890	55.9%	+9.6%
Liberal Democrats	Janel Marie Blattler	257	16.1%	−8.8%
Conservative	Richard Robeson	237	14.8%	−3.3%
Green	James Eric Towell	157	9.8%	+2.9%
Independent	Michael Turberville	42	2.6%	+0.9%
Majority		623	39.8%	
Turnout		1592	22%	
Labour gain from Liberal Democrats		Swing	+9.2%	

Kentwood Ward
Party	Candidate	Votes	%	±%
Labour	Daya Pal Singh	1,052	46.8%	+9.2%
Conservative	Emma Warman	796	35.4%	−9.0%
Green	Kevin Jackson	144	6.4%	+0.7%
Common Sense	Matthew James Plunkett	126	5.6%	+1.3%
Liberal Democrats	Jon Walls	121	5.4%	−2.7%
Majority		256	11.4%	
Turnout		2250	30%	
Labour gain from Conservative		Swing	+9.1%	

Mapledurham Ward
Party	Candidate	Votes	%	±%
Conservative	Isobel Ballsdon	695	66.6%	+6.5%
Labour	Ashley Mark Edward Pearce	136	12.9%	+8.0%
Liberal Democrats	Chris Burden	111	10.5%	+1.6%
Green	Dougie Coulter	103	9.8%	+7.8%
Majority		559	53.7%	
Turnout		1050	41%	
Conservative hold		Swing	-2.5%	

Minster Ward
Party	Candidate	Votes	%	±%
Labour Co-op	Liz Terry	1,351	59.2%	+11.2%
Conservative	Alanzo Nesta Seville	600	26.3%	−9.1%
Liberal Democrats	Georgina Hughes	164	7.2%	−2.4%
Green	Sunil Gandhi	162	7.1%	−0.3%
Majority		751	32.9%	
Turnout		2284	29%	
Labour Co-op hold		Swing	+10.1%	

Norcot Ward
Party	Candidate	Votes	%	±%
Labour	Josephine Lovelock	1,378	68.8%	+10.3%
Conservative	Michael Fairfax	400	19.9%	−4.5%
Green	David James Patterson	117	5.8%	−2.5%
Liberal Democrats	Margaret McNeill	96	4.7%	−4.1%
Majority		978	48.9%	
Turnout		2001	27%	
Labour hold		Swing	+7.4%	

Park Ward
Party	Candidate	Votes	%	±%
Green	Jamie Whitham	1,246	46.4%	+3.0%
Labour Co-op	Rachael Chrisp	1,094	40.8%	+7.6%
Conservative	Laurence Taylor	279	10.4%	−9.6%
Liberal Democrats	Hoyte Paul Arnoud Swager	54	2.0%	−1.4%
Majority		152	5.6%	
Turnout		2681	35%	
Green gain from Labour		Swing	-4.4%	

Peppard Ward
Party	Candidate	Votes	%	±%
Conservative	Jane Stanford-Beale	1,090	38.4%	−19.9%
Independent	Jamie Chowdhary	789	27.8%	+27.8%
Labour	David Lawrence Absolom	434	15.3%	−2.9%
Liberal Democrats	Mustafa Chaudhary	297	10.4%	−4.0%
Green	Kate Day	210	7.4%	+1.9%
Majority		301	10.6%	
Turnout		2834	37%	
Conservative gain from Independent		Swing	-23.8%	

Redlands Ward
Party	Candidate	Votes	%	±%
Labour Co-op	Tony Jones	1,032	51.8%	+7.5%
Liberal Democrats	James Moore	425	21.3%	−4.6%
Conservative	Leo Lester	273	13.7%	−4.3%
Green	Robert Alan Booth	251	12.6%	+1.2%
Majority		607	30.5%	
Turnout		1992	26%	
Labour Co-op gain from Liberal Democrats		Swing	+6.0%	

Southcote Ward
Party	Candidate	Votes	%	±%
Labour	Debs Edwards	1,364	65.0%	+8.9%
Conservative	Ali Asghar	478	22.8%	−8.4%
Liberal Democrats	David Robert Warren	142	6.7%	−0.3%
Green	Kizzi Miranda Murtagh	112	5.3%	−0.4%
Majority		886	42.2%	
Turnout		2096	32%	
Labour hold		Swing	+8.6%	

Thames Ward
Party	Candidate	Votes	%	±%
Conservative	Ed Hopper	1,266	44.9%	−9.7%
Labour Co-op	Duncan Quay Bruce	625	22.2%	+1.3%
Independent	John Dickson	322	11.4%	+11.4%
Green	Helen Isobel McNamara	311	11.0%	−0.2%
Liberal Democrats	Guy William Gipps Penman	282	10.0%	−3.3%
Majority		641	22.7%	
Turnout		2815	38%	
Conservative hold		Swing	-5.5%	

Tilehurst Ward
Party	Candidate	Votes	%	±%
Liberal Democrats	Meri O'Connell	897	38.6%	+7.1%
Conservative	Robert Vickers	604	26.0%	−11.7%
Labour	Haji Banaras	510	21.9%	−3.6%
UKIP	William Stewart Graham MacPhee	220	9.4%	+9.4%
Green	Doug Cresswell	89	3.7%	−1.5%
Majority		293	12.6%	
Turnout		2321	32%	
Liberal Democrats hold		Swing	+9.4%	

Whitley Ward
Party	Candidate	Votes	%	±%
Labour	Mike Orton	1,144	64.4%	+7.5%
Conservative	Nick Brown	318	17.9%	−6.6%
Common Sense	Mike Diamond	99	5.5%	−3.4%
Independent	Jamie Steven Wake	82	4.6%	+4.6%
Green	Keith Martin Johnson	68	3.8%	−1.4%
Liberal Democrats	Rebecca Ellen Chester	57	3.2%	2.0%
Majority		826	46.5%	
Turnout		1775	22%	
Labour hold		Swing	+7.0%	
