= 2018 Reading Borough Council election =

2018 UK local government election

- 3 May 2018

18 out of 46 seats to Reading Borough Council 24 seats needed for a majority
- Turnout: 34.4% ▲0.6pp
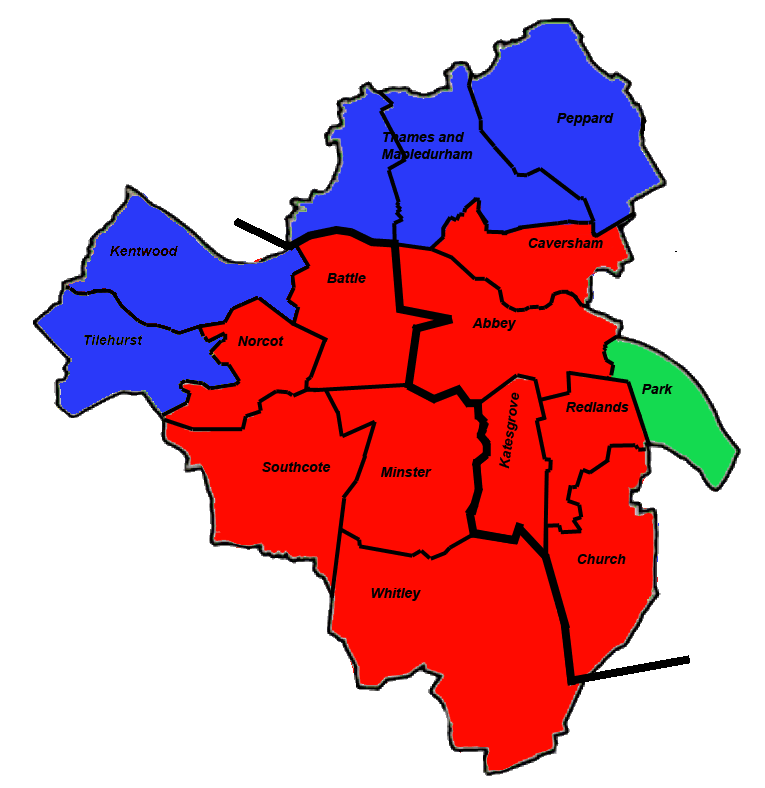
- Winner of each seat at the 2018 Reading Borough Council election

The 2018 Reading Borough Council election took place on 3 May 2018 to elect members of Reading Borough Council. There were three casual vacancies in Kentwood, Katesgrove and Church wards due to the early retirement of Councillors. The Labour Party held on to control of Reading Borough Council seeing their vote increase in seats across the Reading East constituency but suffering setbacks in the marginal seat of Kentwood where The Conservative Party gained a seat. The Conservatives also succeeded in gaining Tilehurst ward from the Liberal Democrats, reducing the Liberal Democrats to one remaining Councillor. The election was held on the same day as other local elections.

== Election result ==
Reading Borough Council Election, 2018
Party	Seats	Gains	Losses	Net gain/loss	Seats %	Votes %	Votes	+/−
Labour	12	0	-1	-1	66.6	48.3	21,579	+3.4
Conservative	5	+2	0	+2	27.7	29.9	13,358	+1.6
Green	1	0	0	0	5.5	10.9	4,904	-1.3
Liberal Democrats	0	0	-1	-1	0.0	10.4	4,638	-1.1
Independent	0	0	0	0	0.0	0.15	61	N/A
Women's Equality	0	0	0	0	0.0	0.2	94	N/A
TUSC	0	0	0	0	0.0	0.1	26	N/C

== Ward results ==
=== Abbey ===
Abbey
Party	Candidate	Votes	%	±%
Labour	Karen Rowland	1,542	60.1	+1.9
Conservative	Alison Stevens	510	19.9	−1.2
Green	Brent Smith	266	10.4	−0.3
Liberal Democrats	Chris Burden	249	9.7	−0.2
Majority		1,032	40.2	
Turnout		2,581	27.13	
Labour hold		Swing	+1.6	

=== Battle ===
Battle
Party	Candidate	Votes	%	±%
Labour	Sarah Hacker	1,470	65.9	+6.2
Conservative	Michael Hey	420	18.8	−1.6
Green	Fiona Cox	184	8.2	−2.4
Liberal Democrats	John Grout	158	7.1	−2.2
Majority		1,050	47.0	
Turnout		2,240	28.46	
Labour hold		Swing	+3.9	

=== Caversham ===
Caversham
Party	Candidate	Votes	%	±%
Labour	Adele Barnett-Ward	1,531	53.4	+2.6
Conservative	James Partington	824	28.7	−4.2
Liberal Democrats	Jo Ramsay	294	10.3	+3.3
Green	David Foster	219	7.6	−1.6
Majority		707	24.7	
Turnout		2,876	38.62	
Labour hold		Swing	+3.4	

=== Church ===
Church
Party	Candidate	Votes	%	±%
Labour	Ruth McEwan	1,129	54.9	+4.4
Labour	Ashley Pearce	1,088	52.9	+2.4
Conservative	Paul Carnell	609	29.6	−3.5
Conservative	Heather Laird	605	29.4	−3.7
Green	Kathryn McCann	268	13.0	+1.8
Liberal Democrats	Francis Jakeman	161	7.8	+2.7
Liberal Democrats	Riccardo Mancuso	115	5.6	+0.5
Turnout		2,056	30.69	−2.1
Labour hold		Swing	N/A	
Labour hold		Swing	N/A	

=== Katesgrove ===
Katesgrove
Party	Candidate	Votes	%	±%
Labour	Sophia James	1,361	66.8	+6.0
Labour	Gurvinder Kaur	1,164	57.1	−3.7
Conservative	Natalie Greenstreet	332	16.3	−0.3
Green	Louise Keane	319	15.6	+2.5
Conservative	Beth Vincent	311	15.2	−1.4
Liberal Democrats	Peter Kinsley	194	9.5	0.0
Liberal Democrats	Margaret McNeill	191	9.3	−0.2
Turnout		2,035	28.68	−0.5
Labour hold		Swing	N/A	
Labour hold		Swing	N/A	

=== Kentwood ===
Kentwood
Party	Candidate	Votes	%	±%
Conservative	Emma Warman	1,216	43.6	+10.2
Conservative	Raj Singh	1,154	41.4	+8.0
Labour	Glenn Dennis	1,148	41.2	−1.7
Labour	Ali Foster	1,056	37.9	−5.4
Liberal Democrats	Mark Cole	309	11.0	+5.1
Liberal Democrats	Gary Coster	266	9.5	+3.6
Green	Richard Walkem	245	8.7	+2.6
Turnout		2,786	38.14	+3.5
Conservative gain from Labour		Swing	N/A	
Conservative hold		Swing	N/A	

=== Minster ===
Minster
Party	Candidate	Votes	%	±%
Labour	Ellie Emberson	1,308	50.0	−0.6
Conservative	Nick Fudge	852	32.6	+7.2
Liberal Democrats	James Moore	333	12.7	+5.4
Green	Willem Londeman	109	4.1	−2.1
Majority		456	17.4	−7.8
Turnout		2,613	34.8	+2.7
Labour hold		Swing	-3.9	

=== Norcot ===
Norcot
Party	Candidate	Votes	%	±%
Labour	Debs Absolom	1,403	59.0	−1.1
Conservative	Zachary Okeyo	640	26.9	+10.5
Green	Jill Wigmore-Welsh	140	5.8	N/C
Liberal Democrats	Stewart Elliott	100	4.2	−0.1
Independent	Alan Gulliver	61	2.5	+2.5
Liberal	Stephen Graham	26	1.0	−1.0
Majority		763	32.1	−11.5
Turnout		2,375	30.6	+0.5
Labour hold		Swing	-5.8	

=== Park ===
Park
Party	Candidate	Votes	%	±%
Green	Rob White	1,704	52.3	+2.2
Labour Co-op	David McKenzie	1,231	37.8	+1.0
Conservative	Adam Phelps	238	7.3	−2.1
Liberal Democrats	Christopher Dodson	75	2.3	0.7
Majority		473	14.5	+1.3
Turnout		3,256	46.2	+2.3
Green hold		Swing	+0.6	

=== Peppard ===
Peppard
Party	Candidate	Votes	%	±%
Conservative	Simon Robinson	1,461	50.4	−0.1
Labour	Benjamin Perry	744	25.6	+4.6
Liberal Democrats	Peter Boardley	401	13.8	−5.2
Green	Doug Cresswell	188	6.4	−2.1
Women's Equality	Wendy Thomson	94	3.2	+3.2
Majority		717	24.7	−5.3
Turnout		2,895	38.1	+4.6
Conservative hold		Swing	-2.4	

=== Redlands ===
Redlands
Party	Candidate	Votes	%	±%
Labour	David Absolom	968	44.5	−9.2
Green	Kizzi Johannessen	630	29.0	+10.3
Conservative	Charlie Evans	350	16.1	−0.7
Liberal Democrats	Graham Alexander	211	9.7	−0.4
Majority		338	15.5	−19.4
Turnout		2,171	35.7	−2.9
Labour hold		Swing	-9.7	

=== Southcote ===
Southcote
Party	Candidate	Votes	%	±%
Labour	John Ennis	1,305	57.6	−5.6
Conservative	Rob Vickers	690	30.5	+8.1
Liberal Democrats	Marie French	130	5.8	−1.7
Green	Amanda Walsh	129	5.6	+0.6
Majority		615	27.1	−11.5
Turnout		2,262	34.0	+0.7
Labour hold		Swing	-6.8	

=== Thames ===
Thames
Party	Candidate	Votes	%	±%
Conservative	David Stevens	1,527	44.4	−1.9
Labour	Brian Murphy	1,175	34.2	+11.2
Liberal Democrats	Guy Penman	420	12.2	−3.9
Green	Sarah McNamara	301	8.7	−3.5
Majority		352	10.2	−14.6
Turnout		3,432	46.6	+6.6
Conservative hold		Swing	-6.5	

=== Tilehurst ===
Tilehurst
Party	Candidate	Votes	%	±%
Conservative	Helen Manghnani	1,092	41.2	+15.4
Liberal Democrats	Ricky Duveen	905	34.2	−7.9
Labour	Matt Harrison	544	20.5	+1.7
Green	Jamie Whitham	96	3.6	+1.4
Majority		167	6.3	−19.5
Turnout		2,645	36.5	+1.0
Conservative gain from Liberal Democrats		Swing	+11.6	

=== Whitley ===
Whitley
Party	Candidate	Votes	%	±%
Labour	Rachel Eden	1,412	63.8	+6.3
Conservative	Helen Hopper	527	23.8	−0.8
Liberal Democrats	John Illenden	126	5.7	−0.3
Green	Lucy Mortlock	106	4.7	−3.0
TUSC	Neil Adams	30	1.3	−1.5
Majority		885	40.0	+7.2
Turnout		2,210	25.3	+1.2
Labour hold		Swing	+3.5	
