= 2019 Reading Borough Council election =

2019 UK local government election

- 2 May 2019

16 out of 46 seats to Reading Borough Council 24 seats needed for a majority
- Turnout: 33.6% ▼0.8pp
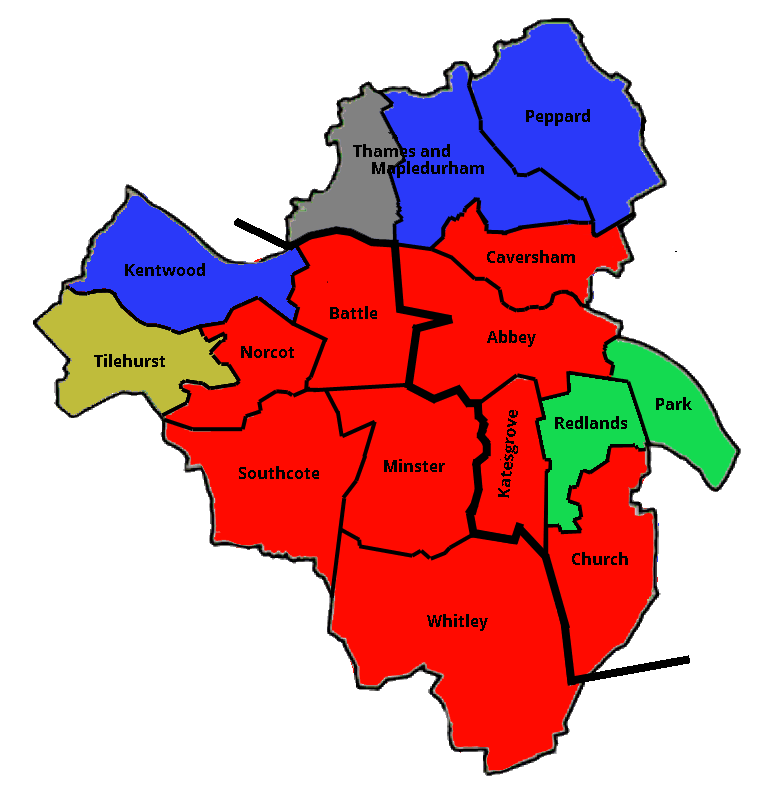
- Winner of each seat at the 2019 Reading Borough Council election

The 2019 Reading Borough Council election took place on 2 May 2019 to elect members in 15 wards of Reading Borough Council. There was also a casual vacancy in Thames ward. The Labour Party held control of the council.

The Liberal Democrats and the Green Party succeeded in making significant increases in their vote across the borough, the Liberal Democrats gaining Tilehurst from the Conservatives and the Green Party gaining Redlands Ward from The Labour Party. The only gain for either of the two major parties was in Caversham where Labour gained a seat from the Conservatives. The election was held on the same day as other local elections.

== Election result ==
2019 Reading Borough Council election
Party	This election			Full council			This election		
Party	Seats	Net	Seats %	Other	Total	Total %	Votes	Votes %	+/−
Labour	9	Steady	56.2	21	30	65.2	15,496	39.4	–8.9
Conservative	4	▼2	25.0	6	10	21.7	10,148	25.8	–4.1
Green	2	▲1	12.5	2	4	8.7	7,537	19.1	+8.2
Liberal Democrats	1	▲1	6.3	1	2	4.3	5,785	14.7	+4.3
UKIP	0	Steady	0.0	0	0	0.0	175	0.4	±0.0
Independent	0	Steady	0.0	0	0	0.0	138	0.4	+0.2
Liberal	0	Steady	0.0	0	0	0.0	45	0.1	New

== Composition ==
After the election the composition of the council was:

↓
30	10	4	2
Lab	Con	G	LD

== Ward results ==
=== Abbey ===
Abbey
Party	Candidate	Votes	%	±%
Labour	Mohammed Ayub	1,179	48.7	−11.4
Green	Howard John Darby	461	19.0	+8.6
Conservative	Alison Stevens	426	17.6	+2.3
Liberal Democrats	Chris Burden	323	13.3	+3.6
Majority		718	29.6	−10.6
Turnout		2,420	26.04	−1.09
Labour hold		Swing	-10.0	

=== Battle ===
Battle
Party	Candidate	Votes	%	±%
Labour	Chris Maskell	1,100	55.0	−10.9
Green	Fiona Cox	343	17.1	+8.0
Conservative	Michael Hey	329	16.4	−2.4
Liberal Democrats	John Grout	227	11.3	+5.2
Majority		757	37.8	−9.8
Turnout		1,999	26.4	−2.0
Labour hold		Swing	-9.45	

=== Caversham ===
Caversham
Party	Candidate	Votes	%	±%
Labour Co-op	Ayo Sokale	1,168	44.1	−9.3
Conservative	Ella Barrett	625	23.6	−5.1
Green	David Foster	448	17.0	+9.4
Liberal Democrats	Hillary Smart	408	15.4	+5.1
Turnout		2,649	37.0	−1.62
Labour Co-op gain from Conservative		Swing	4.2	

=== Church ===
Church
Party	Candidate	Votes	%	±%
Labour	Paul Woodward	832	47.2	−7.7
Conservative	Shekhar Natarjan	418	23.7	−5.9
Green	Kathryn McCann	265	15.0	+3.0
Liberal Democrats	Francis Jakeman	225	12.7	+4.9
Turnout		1,761	27.3	−3.4
Labour hold		Swing	-1.8	

=== Katesgrove ===
Katesgrove
Party	Candidate	Votes	%	±%
Labour	Liam Challenger	1,084	56.4	−10.4
Green	Louise Keane	326	16.9	+1.6
Conservative	Natalie Greenstreet	282	14.6	−1.7
Liberal Democrats	Peter Kinsley	204	10.6	+1.8
Turnout		1921	28.88	−1.8
Labour hold		Swing	-6.0	

=== Kentwood ===
Kentwood
Party	Candidate	Votes	%	±%
Conservative	Raj Singh	1,138	41.6	−2.0
Labour Co-op	Glenn Dennis	1,038	38.0	−3.2
Liberal Democrats	Gary Coster	265	9.7	+0.2
Green	Richard Walkem	261	9.5	+0.8
Turnout		2,730	38.01	−0.13
Conservative hold		Swing	+1.2	

=== Minster ===
Minster
Party	Candidate	Votes	%	±%
Labour	Paul Gittings	1,085	44.9	−5.1
Conservative	Nick Fudge	764	31.6	−1.0
Liberal Democrats	James Moore	296	12.2	−0.5
Green	Willem Londeman	244	10.1	+6.0
Majority		321	13.3	−4.1
Turnout		2,412	34.03	−4.0
Labour hold		Swing	-2.0	

=== Norcot ===
Norcot
Party	Candidate	Votes	%	±%
Labour	Graeme Hoskin	1,156	54.3	−4.7
Conservative	Zack Okeyo	472	22.1	−3.7
Green	Jill Wigmore-Welsh	231	10.8	+5.0
Liberal Democrats	Stew Elliott	163	7.6	+3.4
Independent	Alan Gulliver	138	6.4	+3.9
Liberal	Stephen Graham	45	2.1	+1.1
Majority		684	32.1	N/C
Turnout		2,127	28.3	−3.8
Labour hold		Swing	-0.5	

=== Park ===
Park
Party	Candidate	Votes	%	±%
Green	Josh Williams	1,815	54.5	+2.3
Labour Co-op	Amjad Iqbal Tahir Tarar	1,235	37.0	−0.8
Liberal Democrats	Chris Dodson	84	2.5	+0.2
Conservative	Adam Phelps	82	2.4	−4.9
Majority		580	17.4	+3.1
Turnout		3,329	48.8	+2.6
Green hold		Swing	+0.75	

=== Peppard ===
Peppard
Party	Candidate	Votes	%	±%
Conservative	Clare Grashoff	1,330	48.4	−2.0
Labour	Oliver White	599	21.8	−3.8
Green	Doug Cresswell	408	14.8	+8.4
Liberal Democrats	Simon Smart	376	13.6	−0.2
Majority		731	26.6	+1.9
Turnout		2,746	37.1	−1.0
Conservative hold		Swing	+1.8	

=== Redlands ===
Redlands
Party	Candidate	Votes	%	±%
Green	Jamie Whitham	1,002	46.3	+17.3
Labour Co-op	Mo McSevney	782	36.1	−8.4
Conservative	Beth Vincent	230	10.6	−6.1
Liberal Democrats	Graham Alexander	131	6.0	−3.7
Majority		220	10.2	+25.7
Turnout		2,163	40.5	+4.8
Green gain from Labour Co-op		Swing	+12.8	

=== Southcote ===
Southcote
Party	Candidate	Votes	%	±%
Labour	Jason Brock	1,074	52.2	−5.4
Conservative	Dipika Upadhyay	531	25.8	−4.8
Green	Amanda Walsh	234	11.3	+5.7
Liberal Democrats	Marie French	189	9.2	+3.4
Majority		543	26.4	−0.7
Turnout		2,055	31.3	−2.7
Labour hold		Swing	-0.6	

=== Thames ===
Thames
Party	Candidate	Votes	%	±%
Conservative	Jeanette Skeats	1,244	36.5	−7.9
Conservative	Paul Carnell	1,153	33.8	−10.6
Labour	Boubacar Dembele	822	24.1	−10.1
Labour	Benjamin Perry	796	23.3	−10.9
Liberal Democrats	Jo Ramsay	746	22.0	+9.8
Liberal Democrats	Guy William Penman	700	20.5	+8.3
Green	Sarah McNamara	684	20.1	+11.4
Green	Sally Anne Newman	458	13.4	+4.7
Majority		422	12.4	+2.2
Majority		357	8.8	−1.4
Turnout		3,402	46.7	+0.1
Conservative hold		Swing	+2.2	
Conservative hold		Swing	+0.3	

=== Tilehurst ===
Tilehurst
Party	Candidate	Votes	%	±%
Liberal Democrats	Ricky Duveen	1,264	47.0	+12.8
Conservative	Sandra Vickers	745	27.7	−13.5
Labour	Ali Foster	367	13.6	−6.9
UKIP	William MacPhee	175	6.5	+6.5
Green	Deborah Wilson	122	4.5	+0.9
Majority		519	19.3	+13.0
Turnout		2,684	37.6	+1.1
Liberal Democrats gain from Conservative		Swing	+13.2	

=== Whitley ===
Whitley
Party	Candidate	Votes	%	±%
Labour	Micky Leng	1,179	59.0	−4.8
Conservative	Robert Vickers	379	18.9	−4.9
Green	Lucy Mortlock	235	11.7	+7.0
Liberal Democrats	John Illenden	174	8.7	+3.0
Majority		800	40.0	N/C
Turnout		1,996	22.6	−2.7
Labour hold		Swing	+0.1	

== By-elections between 2019 and 2021 ==
Kentwood by-election 12 December 2019
Party	Candidate	Votes	%	±%
Conservative	Jenny Rynn	2,181	45.2	+3.1
Labour	Glenn Dennis	1,789	37.1	−1.3
Liberal Democrats	Gary Coster	556	11.5	+1.7
Green	Richard Walker	302	6.3	−3.4
Majority		392	8.1	
Turnout		4,828		
Conservative hold		Swing		
