= 2026 Reading Borough Council election =

Local election in Berkshire, England

- 7 May 2026

17 out of 48 seats to Reading Borough Council (including 1 by-election) 25 seats needed for a majority
- Registered: 117,445
- Turnout: 48,407; 41.2% (▲9.2%)
	First party	Second party	Third party
Leader	Liz Terry	Rob White	Raj Singh
Party	Labour	Green	Conservative
Last election	32 seats, 47.4%	8 seats, 20.8%	4 seats, 20.1%
Seats before	32	8	3
Seats won	7	6	3
Seats after	29	11	5
Seat change	▼3	▲3	▲2
Popular vote	15,300	15,113	9,179
Percentage	29.2%	28.8%	17.4%
Swing	▼18.3%	▲8.0%	▼2.7%
	Fourth party	Fifth party	Sixth party
Leader	Anne Thompson	Clarence Mitchell (defeated)
Party	Liberal Democrats	Reform	Independent
Last election	3 seats, 10.3%	0 seats, 0.5%	1 seat, 0.1%
Seats before	3	1	1
Seats won	1	0	0
Seats after	3	0	0
Seat change	Steady	▼1	▼1
Popular vote	4,158	8,592	27
Percentage	7.9%	16.4%	0.1%
Swing	▼2.4%	▲15.9%	0.0%
- Winner of each seat at the 2026 Reading Borough Council election.
Leader before election
Liz Terry
Labour
Leader after election
Liz Terry
Labour

The 2026 Reading Borough Council election was held on 7 May 2026, alongside the other local elections across the United Kingdom being held on the same day, to elect 17 of 48 members of Reading Borough Council.

Of these, 16 seats are part of the regular election cycle, in which one-third of the council is elected in three out of every four years. The other seat contested was a vacancy in Caversham Heights, following the decision of councillor Sam Juthani to step down.

At 41.2%, turnout was the highest outside of a general election since the 1991 Reading Borough Council election. The Labour Party maintained an overall majority, continuing its rule of the council since 1986 (with the exception of 2010-2011). The Green Party gained its best-ever result, enlarging its group to double digits and defeating 3 Labour lead councillors. The Liberal Democrats retained their control of Tilehurst ward but failed to make inroads elsewhere. Despite its impressive performance nationally, Reform UK failed to have a breakthrough, losing its lone seat, which it had gained through a Conservative defection.

== Council composition ==
After 2024 election		Before 2026 election	
Party	Seats	Party	Seats
Labour	32	Labour	31
Green	8	Green	8
Conservative	4	Conservative	3
Liberal Democrats	3	Liberal Democrats	3
Reform	0	Reform	1
Independent	1	Independent	1
Vacant	N/A	Vacant	1

Changes 2024–2026:

- January 2026: Clarence Mitchell (Conservative) defects to Reform
- March 2026: Sam Juthani (Labour) resigns – seat left vacant until 2026 election

== Summary ==
=== Background ===
In 2024, Labour retained control of the council.

=== Election result ===
2026 Reading Borough Council election
Party	This election				Full council			This election		
Party	Candidates	Seats	Net	Seats %	Other	Total	Total %	Votes	Votes %	+/−
Labour	{{{candidates}}}	7	▼3	41.2	22	29	60.4	15,300	29.2	–18.2
Green	{{{candidates}}}	6	▲3	35.3	5	11	22.9	15,113	28.8	+8.0
Conservative	{{{candidates}}}	3	▲2	17.6	2	5	10.4	9,179	17.4	–2.7
Liberal Democrats	{{{candidates}}}	1	Steady	5.9	2	3	6.3	4,158	7.9	-2.4
Reform	{{{candidates}}}	0	▼1	0.0	0	0	0.0	8,592	16.4	+15.9
Independent	{{{candidates}}}	0	▼1	0.0	0	0	0.0	27	0.1	0.0
Liberal	{{{candidates}}}	0	Steady	0.0	0	0	0.0	51	0.1	±0.0
SDP	{{{candidates}}}	0	Steady	0.0	0	0	0.0	29	0.1	N/A
TUSC	{{{candidates}}}	0	Steady	0.0	0	0	0.0	25	<0.0	-0.8

== Incumbents ==
Ward	Incumbent councillor	Party	Re-standing
Abbey	Karen Rowland	Labour	Yes
Battle	Sarah Hacker	Independent (Note: Originally elected for Labour, but expelled from the party in 2023, and sat as an independent for the remainder of her term.)	No
Caversham	Jacopo Lanzoni	Labour	Yes
Caversham Heights	Isobel Ballsdon	Conservative	Yes
Caversham Heights	Sam Juthani	Labour	No (Note: Elected in 2023 to serve until 2027, but stood down early.)
Church	Ruth McEwan	Labour	Yes
Coley	Ellie Emberson	Labour	Yes
Emmer Green	Clarence Mitchell	Reform (Note: Originally elected as a Conservative, but defected to Reform in January 2026.)	Yes
Katesgrove	Louise Keane	Green	Yes
Kentwood	Glenn Dennis	Labour	Yes
Norcot	Jo Lovelock	Labour	No
Park	Rob White	Green	Yes
Redlands	Kathryn McCann	Green	Yes
Southcote	Deborah Edwards	Labour	No
Thames	Adele Barnett-Ward	Labour	Yes
Tilehurst	Meri O'Connell	Liberal Democrats	Yes
Whitley	Rachel Eden	Labour	Yes

== Ward results ==
Votes were counted overnight and the results published on the council's website on 8 May.

=== Abbey ===
Abbey
Party	Candidate	Votes	%	±%
Green	Jacqueline Dominguez	792	37.6	▲24.1
Labour	Karen Rowland*	683	32.5	▼11.7
Conservative	Robert Dalton	279	13.3	▼18.7
Reform	Paul Newton	202	9.6	N/A
Liberal Democrats	Henry Wright	139	6.6	▼3.0
TUSC	James Morgan	9	0.4	N/A
Majority		109	5.1	N/A
Turnout		2,109	32.4	▲4.6
Registered electors		6,512		
Green gain from Labour		Swing	▲17.9	

=== Battle ===
Battle
Party	Candidate	Votes	%	±%
Labour	Pratikshya Gurung	1,180	41.4	−22.4
Green	Zoe Mann	998	35.0	+15.9
Reform	Diana Whitehouse	335	11.8	N/A
Conservative	Ben Blackmore	207	7.3	−3.1
Liberal Democrats	John Grout	118	4.1	−2.6
Majority		182	6.4	−38.3
Turnout		2,851	38.2	+11.4
Registered electors		7,470		
Labour gain from Independent		Swing	▼19.2	

=== Caversham ===
Caversham
Party	Candidate	Votes	%	±%
Labour	Jacopo Lanzoni*	1,438	38.4	−16.8
Green	Sam Wild	920	24.5	+9.3
Reform	Jeff Lewis	600	16.0	N/A
Conservative	Andrew Ballsdon	549	14.6	−2.4
Liberal Democrats	Anthony Spencer	225	6.0	−4.5
SDP	Bill Runacre	16	0.4	N/A
Majority		518	13.8	−24.4
Turnout		3,761	49.4	+11.0
Registered electors		7,608		
Labour hold		Swing	▼13.1	

=== Caversham Heights ===
Caversham Heights (2 seats due to by-election)
Party	Candidate	Votes	%	±%
Conservative	Isobel Ballsdon*	1,900	44.2	+9.5
Conservative	Saadia Saadat	1,218	28.3	−6.4
Labour	Richard Stainthorp	1,088	25.3	−15.9
Labour	Jo Musominari	1,058	24.6	−16.6
Green	Danny McNamara	866	20.1	+2.6
Green	Adil Khan	761	17.7	+0.2
Reform	James Stothard	580	13.5	N/A
Reform	Ilayda Molloy	496	11.5	N/A
Liberal Democrats	Jo Ramsay	416	9.7	−15.2
Liberal Democrats	Vania Costa-Krol	271	6.3	−0.3
Turnout		4,438	58.6	+12.9
Registered electors		7,575		
Conservative hold				
Conservative gain from Labour				

Isobel Ballsdon was re-elected to the ward's regular seat. The second seat was vacant following the resignation of Labour councillor Sam Juthani, and was won by Saadia Saadat.

=== Church ===
Church
Party	Candidate	Votes	%	±%
Labour	Ruth McEwan*	1,095	39.4	−19.7
Reform	Matthew Reynolds	680	24.5	N/A
Green	Jamie Whitham	468	16.8	+4.3
Conservative	Adam Phelps	362	13.0	−8.6
Liberal Democrats	Mark Cole	163	5.9	−0.9
Majority		415	14.9	−22.6
Turnout		2,780	34.0	+8.7
Registered electors		8,174		
Labour hold				

=== Coley ===
Coley
Party	Candidate	Votes	%	±%
Green	Richard Walkem	973	33.4	▲20.6
Labour	Ellie Emberson*	964	33.1	▼21.7
Reform	Petru Mereacre	445	15.3	N/A
Conservative	John Angus	367	12.6	▼7.1
Liberal Democrats	Christopher Ward	166	5.7	▼2.7
Majority		9	0.3	▼34.7
Turnout		2,929	41.8	▲10.2
Registered electors		7,008		
Green gain from Labour		Swing	▲21.2	

=== Emmer Green ===
Emmer Green
Party	Candidate	Votes	%	±%
Conservative	Alex Smith	1,143	27.8	–8.9
Green	Hannah Conibear	1,103	26.8	+13.5
Reform	Clarence Mitchell*	805	19.6	N/A
Labour	Ollie White	770	18.7	–22.1
Liberal Democrats	Nishikant Gupta	290	7.1	–2.1
Majority		40	1.0	N/A
Turnout		4,117	52.6	+15.4
Registered electors		7,835		
Conservative gain from Reform		Swing	▼11.2	

=== Katesgrove ===
Katesgrove
Party	Candidate	Votes	%	±%
Green	Louise Keane*	1,340	50.8	▲6.1
Labour	Richard Wong	604	22.9	▼13.9
Conservative	Matthew Callow	281	10.6	▲0.3
Reform	Prabhdeep Singh	279	10.6	N/A
Liberal Democrats	Sarah Dobson	109	4.1	▼0.8
Independent	Jean Pascual	27	1.0	▼0.2
Majority		736	27.9	▲20.0
Turnout		2,653	35.0	▲5.1
Registered electors		7,591		
Green hold		Swing	▲10.0	

=== Kentwood ===
Kentwood
Party	Candidate	Votes	%	±%
Labour Co-op	Glenn Dennis*	1,014	32.4	–15.7
Conservative	David Milne-Buckley	775	24.8	–11.3
Reform	Stephen Ruston	736	23.5	N/A
Green	Tim Liddle	476	15.2	+5.0
Liberal Democrats	Jibril al-Nabahani	127	4.1	–1.6
Majority		239	7.6	–4.4
Turnout		3,133	46.6	+11.3
Registered electors		6,720		
Labour Co-op hold		Swing	▼2.2	

=== Norcot ===
Norcot
Party	Candidate	Votes	%	±%
Labour	Alison Foster	967	35.4	–15.0
Reform	Oliver Maunder	641	23.5	+15.2
Green	Isobel Hoskins	558	20.4	+10.5
Conservative	Kes Williams	293	10.7	–3.3
Liberal Democrats	Brandon Masih	221	8.1	–5.8
Liberal	Stephen Graham	51	1.9	+0.1
Majority		326	11.9	–24.5
Turnout		2,744	36.1	+7.4
Registered electors		7,598		
Labour hold		Swing	▼15.1	

=== Park ===
Park
Party	Candidate	Votes	%	±%
Green	Rob White*	1,872	65.2	▲7.6
Labour	James Cuggy	591	20.6	▼13.0
Reform	Stephen Ham	190	6.6	N/A
Conservative	Kris Lund	149	5.2	▼0.6
Liberal Democrats	Jassien Sabri	71	2.5	▼0.1
Majority		1,281	44.6	▲20.6
Turnout		2,886	42.8	▲4.4
Registered electors		6,741		
Green hold		Swing	▲10.3	

=== Redlands ===
Redlands
Party	Candidate	Votes	%	±%
Green	Kathryn McCann*	1,549	54.8	▲0.9
Labour Co-op	Roy Rangarirai	708	25.0	▼8.6
Reform	Darren Seward	254	9.0	N/A
Conservative	Abdoulaye Sow	179	6.3	▼0.3
Liberal Democrats	Christopher Wilson	122	4.3	▲0.6
TUSC	Melanie Dent	16	0.6	▼0.9
Majority		841	29.8	▲9.5
Turnout		2,838	40.2	▲7.4
Registered electors		7,065		
Green hold		Swing	▲4.8	

=== Southcote ===
Southcote
Party	Candidate	Votes	%	±%
Labour	Ulrike Magyarosy	1,032	36.0	–23.6
Reform	Bev Heslin	623	21.7	N/A
Green	Rosemary Croft	614	21.4	+10.5
Conservative	Grace Blackmore	408	14.2	–5.1
Liberal Democrats	Benjamin Sims	188	6.6	–2.7
Majority		409	14.3	–26.0
Turnout		2,875	37.1	+7.9
Registered electors		7,741		
Labour hold				

=== Thames ===
Thames
Party	Candidate	Votes	%	±%
Green	David Clarke	1,031	39.1	▲22.8
Labour	Adele Barnett-Ward*	750	28.5	▼24.1
Reform	Alexander Kelly	351	13.3	N/A
Conservative	Jaykumar Patel	308	11.7	▼6.8
Liberal Democrats	Christopher Burden	183	6.9	▼5.3
SDP	James Halls	13	0.5	N/A
Majority		250	10.6	N/A
Turnout		2,640	42.4	▲10.5
Registered electors		6,226		
Green gain from Labour		Swing	▲23.5	

=== Tilehurst ===
Tilehurst
Party	Candidate	Votes	%	±%
Liberal Democrats	Meri O'Connell*	1,144	38.4	–13.7
Reform	Steven Low	763	25.6	N/A
Labour	Caroline Basden	439	14.7	–6.4
Green	Caroline Hearst	343	11.5	+4.7
Conservative	Raihana Rahimi	288	9.7	–9.5
Majority		381	12.8	–18.2
Turnout		2,985	41.3	+10.0
Registered electors		7,235		
Liberal Democrats hold				

=== Whitley ===
Whitley
Party	Candidate	Votes	%	±%
Labour Co-op	Rachel Eden*	919	34.6	–23.1
Reform	Richie Sahni	612	23.0	N/A
Conservative	Vani Goel	473	17.8	–3.3
Green	Kathy Smith	449	16.9	+7.4
Liberal Democrats	Pieter de Boiserie	205	7.7	–1.5
Majority		307	11.6	–24.9
Turnout		2,668	32.0	+8.3
Registered electors		8,346		
Labour Co-op hold				

== Post-election changes ==
=== Caversham Heights by-election ===
Caversham Heights by-election: 26 November 2026
Party	Candidate	Votes	%	±%
Labour	Wrishi Basu			
Restore	Tom Hadow			
Green	Adil Khan			
Conservative	David Luckett			
Reform	Clarence Mitchell			
Liberal Democrats	Jo Ramsay			
Majority				
Turnout				
		Swing		
