= 2016 Reading Borough Council election =

2016 UK local government election

- 5 May 2016

16 out of 46 seats to Reading Borough Council 24 seats needed for a majority
- Turnout: 33.8% ▼29.9pp
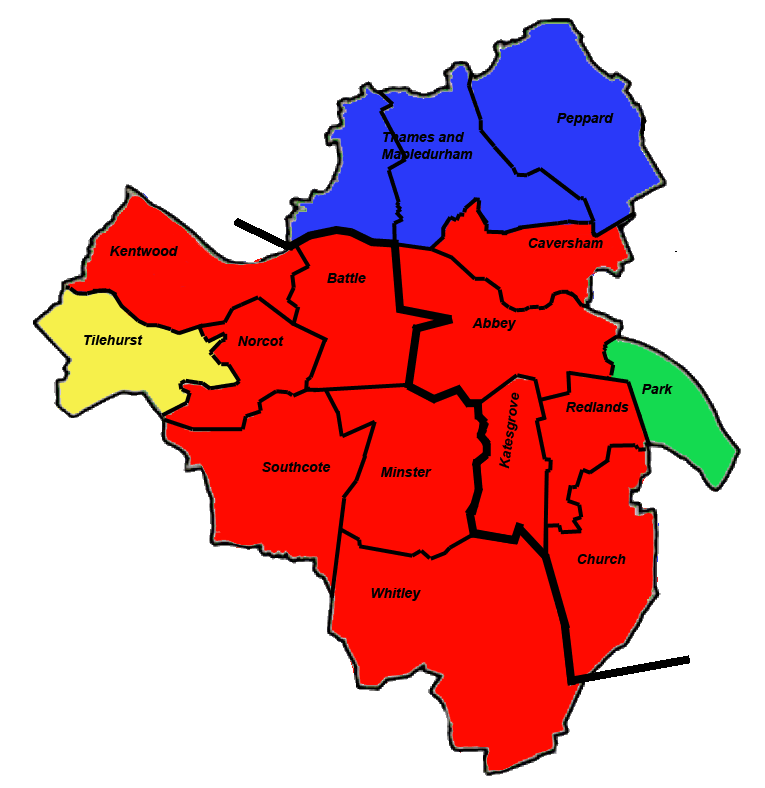
- Winner of each seat at the 2016 Reading Borough Council election

The 2016 Reading Borough Council election took place on 5 May 2016 to elect members of Reading Borough Council in England. The election for Police and Crime Commissioner was held on the same day. The Labour Party increased their borough-wide vote by over 7% and held on to marginal seats in Church, Kentwood and Caversham, the latter receiving the highest number of votes recorded for any candidate at this election .

After the election, the composition of the council was:

Party	Seats	+/-
Labour	31	0
Conservative	10	0
Green Party	3	0
Liberal Democrats	2	0
Labour hold		

== Election result ==
Reading Borough Council Election, 2016
Party	Seats	Gains	Losses	Net gain/loss	Seats %	Votes %	Votes	+/−
Labour	11	0	0	0	68.7	45.0	15,888	+7.5
Conservative	3	0	0	0	18.7	28.3	10,017	-7.0
Green	1	0	0	0	6.2	12.2	4,318	+1.1
Liberal Democrats	1	0	0	0	6.2	11.5	4,075	+3.7
UKIP	0	0	0	0	0.0	2.7	970	-5.2
TUSC	0	0	0	0	0.0	0.0	55	0.0
Liberal	0	0	0	0	0.0	0.0	44	0.0

== Ward results ==
=== Abbey ===
Abbey
Party	Candidate	Votes	%	±%
Labour	Tony Page	1,281	58.2%	+15.9%
Conservative	Trevor Slack	466	21.1%	
Green	Joe Sylvester	236	10.7%	
Liberal Democrats	Kirsten Bayes	218	9.9%	
Majority		815	37.1%	
Labour hold		Swing		

=== Battle ===
Battle 2016
Party	Candidate	Votes	%	±%
Labour	Gul Khan	1,174		
Conservative	Michael Hey	401		
Green	Alan Lockey	209		
Liberal Democrats	John Grout	183		
Majority		773		
Labour hold		Swing		

=== Caversham ===
Caversham 2016
Party	Candidate	Votes	%	±%
Labour	Richard Davies	1,481	50.8	
Conservative	Ed Hogan	961	33.0	
Green	David Foster	270	9.3	
Liberal Democrats	Christopher Burden	203	7.0	
Majority		520	17.8	
Labour hold		Swing		

=== Church ===
Church 2016
Party	Candidate	Votes	%	±%
Labour	Eileen McElligott	985		
Conservative	Paul Carnell	646		
Green	Kathryn McCann	220		
Liberal Democrats	Ben Thomas	100		
Majority		339		
Labour hold		Swing		

=== Katesgrove ===
Katesgrove 2016
Party	Candidate	Votes	%	±%
Labour	Rose Williams	1,106	60.8%	
Conservative	Syed Abbas	302	16.6%	
Green	Louise Keane	239	13.1%	
Liberal Democrats	Margaret McNeill	172	9.5%	
Majority		804	44.2%	
Labour hold		Swing		

=== Kentwood ===
Kentwood 2016
Party	Candidate	Votes	%	±%
Labour	Daya Pal Singh	1,054		
Conservative	Emma Warman	810		
UKIP	Howard Thomas	254		
Green	Ruth Shaffrey	150		
Liberal Democrats	Glenn Goodall	145		
Majority				
Labour hold		Swing		

=== Mapledurham ===
Mapledurham 2016
Party	Candidate	Votes	%	±%
Conservative	Isobel Ballsdon	590		
Liberal Democrats	Jenny Woods	262		
Labour	Simon Rogers	161		
Green	Brent Smith	87		
Majority				
Conservative hold		Swing		

=== Minster ===
Minster 2016
Party	Candidate	Votes	%	±%
Labour	Liz Terry	1,139		
Conservative	Alanzo Seville	572		
UKIP	Linda Ann Giles	224		
Liberal Democrats	James Moore	166		
Green	Keith Johnson	141		
Majority				
Labour hold		Swing		

=== Norcot ===
Norcot 2016
Party	Candidate	Votes	%	±%
Labour	Jo Lovelock	1,305		
Conservative	Robert Masterson	358		
UKIP	Philip Martin Giles	232		
Green	Jill Wigmore-Welsh	126		
Liberal Democrats	Jon Walls	95		
Liberal	Stephen Graham	44		
Majority				
Labour hold		Swing		

=== Park ===
Park 2016
Party	Candidate	Votes	%	±%
Green	Brenda McGonigle	1,375		
Labour	Dave Dymond	1,011		
Conservative	Roland Hazell	260		
Liberal Democrats	Rebecca Rye	83		
Majority				
Green hold		Swing		

=== Peppard ===
Peppard 2016
Party	Candidate	Votes	%	±%
Conservative	Jane Beale-Stanford	1,299		
Labour	Leighton Yeo	542		
Liberal Democrats	Peter Boardley	489		
Green	Sally Newman	219		
Majority				
Conservative hold		Swing		

=== Redlands ===
Redlands 2016
Party	Candidate	Votes	%	±%
Labour	Tony Jones	1,096		
Green	Kizzi Murtagh	383		
Conservative	Natalie Greenstreet	343		
Liberal Democrats	Francis Jakeman	206		
Majority				
Labour hold		Swing		

=== Southcote ===
Southcote 2016
Party	Candidate	Votes	%	±%
Labour	Debs Edwards	1,325		
Conservative	Russell Martin	515		
Liberal Democrats	Mark Cole	129		
Green	Doug Cresswell	106		
Majority				
Labour hold		Swing		

=== Thames ===
Thames 2016
Party	Candidate	Votes	%	±%
Conservative	Ed Hopper	1,383		
Labour	Karen Rowland	665		
Liberal Democrats	Guy Penman	467		
Green	Sarah McNamara	353		
Majority				
Conservative hold		Swing		

=== Tilehurst ===
Tilehurst 2016
Party	Candidate	Votes	%	±%
Liberal Democrats	Meri O’Connell	1,044		
Conservative	Robert Vickers	641		
Labour	Matt Harrison	468		
UKIP	Stephen George James	260		
Green	Miriam Kennet	56		
Majority				
Liberal Democrats hold		Swing		

=== Whitley ===
Whitley 2016
Party	Candidate	Votes	%	±%
Labour	Emmett McKenna	1,095		
Conservative	James Kiriamiti	470		
Green	Richard Black	148		
Liberal Democrats	Roy Haines	115		
TUSC	Neil Adams	55		
Majority				
Labour hold		Swing		

== By-elections between 2016 and 2018 ==
Southcote by-election 21 July 2016
Party	Candidate	Votes	%	±%
Labour	Jason Brook	934	64.1	+0.2
Conservative	Russell Martin	381	26.1	+1.3
Liberal Democrats	Mark Cole	77	5.3	−0.9
Green	Alan Lockey	66	4.5	−0.6
Majority		553	37.9	
Turnout		1,458		
Labour hold		Swing		
