= 2027 Reading Borough Council election =

2027 English local government election

- 6 May 2027

16 out of 48 seats to Reading Borough Council 25 seats needed for a majority
Leader	Liz Terry	Rob White
Party	Labour	Green
Leader's seat	Coley	Park
Last election	29 seats, 29.2%	11 seats, 28.8%
Current seats	29 (Note: Including the vacant seat in Caversham Heights last held by Labour.)	11
Leader	Raj Singh	Anne Thompson
Party	Conservative	Liberal Democrats
Leader's seat	Kentwood	Tilehurst
Last election	5 seats, 17.4%	3 seats, 7.9%
Current seats	5	3
Incumbent Leader
Liz Terry
Labour Co-op

The 2027 Reading Borough Council election will be held on 6 May 2027 to elect members of Reading Borough Council in Berkshire, England. This will be on the same day as other local elections held across the United Kingdom.

== Summary ==
=== Election result ===
2027 Reading Borough Council election
Party	This election				Full council			This election		
Party	Candidates	Seats	Net	Seats %	Other	Total	Total %	Votes	Votes %	+/−
Labour					18					
Green					9					
Conservative					2					
Liberal Democrats					2					

=== Incumbents ===
Ward	Incumbent councillor	Affiliation	Re-standing
Abbey	Mohammed Ayub	Labour	
Battle	Amjad Tarar	Labour Co-op	
Caversham	Jan Gavin	Labour	
Caversham Heights	Saadia Saadat	Conservative	
Church	Paul Woodward	Labour	
Coley	Paul Gittings	Labour	
Emmer Green	Stephen Goss	Conservative	
Katesgrove	Doug Cresswell	Green	
Kentwood	Raj Singh	Conservative	
Norcot	Finn McGoldrick	Labour	
Park	Josh Williams	Green	
Redlands	Will Cross	Labour Co-op	
Southcote	John Ennis	Labour	
Thames	Ama Asare	Labour	
Tilehurst	Anne Thompson	Liberal Democrats	
Whitley	Alice Mpofu-Coles	Labour Co-op	
