= 2015 Reading Borough Council election =

2015 UK local government election

- 7 May 2015

15 out of 46 seats to Reading Borough Council 24 seats needed for a majority
- Turnout: 63.7% ▲30.4pp
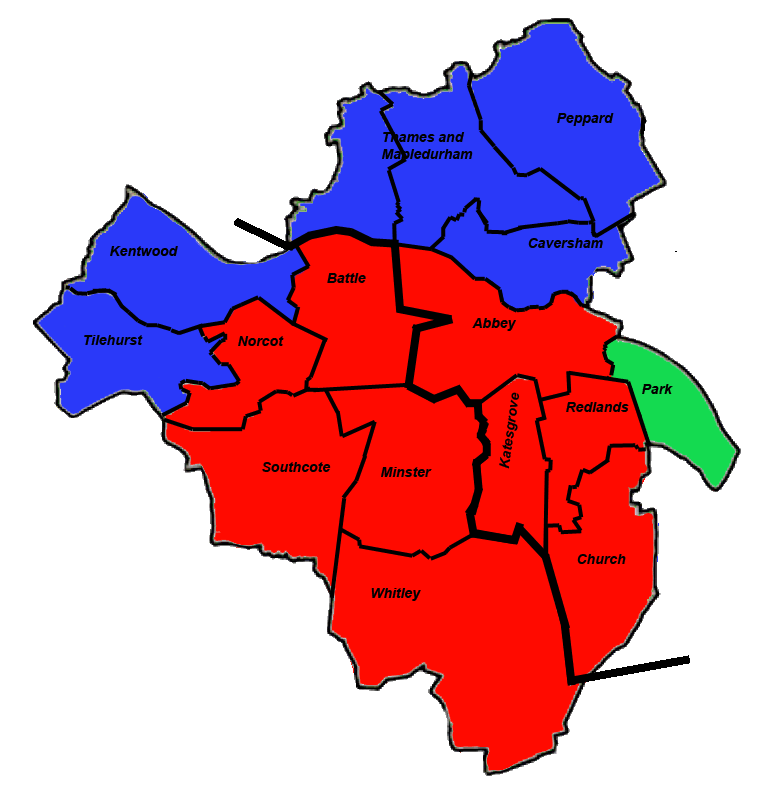
- Winner of each seat at the 2015 Reading Borough Council election

Elections to Reading Borough Council took place on 7 May 2015 to elect approximately one third of the members of Reading Borough Council in England to coincide with other local elections, an election which was held simultaneously with the 2015 General Election, resulting in higher turnout than the previous election. The election resulted in no change in terms of the political make-up of the Council with each political party holding their respective seats.

After the election, the composition of the council was:

Party	Seats	+/-
Labour	31	0
Conservative	10	0
Green Party	3	0
Liberal Democrats	2	0
Labour hold		

== Election result ==
Reading Borough Council Election, 2015
Party	Seats	Gains	Losses	Net gain/loss	Seats %	Votes %	Votes	+/−
Labour	9	0	0	0	60.0	37.5	25,803	-1.5
Conservative	5	0	0	0	33.3	35.3	24,260	+9.8
Green	1	0	0	0	6.6	11.1	7,624	-2.5
UKIP	0	0	0	0	0.0	7.9	5,467	-1.0
Liberal Democrats	0	0	0	0	0.0	7.8	5,361	-1.1
Independent	0	0	0	0	0.0	0.0	57	-3.9
Liberal	0	0	0	0	0.0	0.0	47	N/C
The Roman Party Ave!	0	0	0	0	0.0	0.0	34	-0.1
TUSC	0	0	0	0	0.0	0.0	13	-0.1

== Ward results ==
Abbey Ward
Party	Candidate	Votes	%	±%
Labour	Mohammed Ayub	1,950	42.3%	−6.7%
Conservative	Chris Ashworth	1,454	31.6%	+12.2%
Green	Richard Black	535	11.6%	−1.3%
Liberal Democrats	James Moore	393	8.5%	−0.4%
UKIP	William MacPhee	269	5.8%	−3.2%
Majority		496	10.7%	−18.8%
Turnout		4.601	53.7%	+28.7%
Labour hold		Swing	-9.4%	

Battle Ward
Party	Candidate	Votes	%	±%
Labour	Chris Maskell	2,219	53.1%	−3.9%
Conservative	Michael Hey	979	23.4%	+3.4%
Green	Alan Edward Lockey	389	9.3%	−4.0%
UKIP	Jack McLeod	276	6.6%	+6.6%
Liberal Democrats	Glenn Goodall	275	6.5%	−1.0%
The Roman Party Ave!	Jean-Louis Pascual	34	0.8%	−1.1%
Majority		1,240	27.5%	−9.4%
Turnout		4,172	56%	+28%
Labour hold		Swing	-3.6%	

Caversham Ward
Party	Candidate	Votes	%	±%
Conservative	Claire McDonald	1,921	38.8%	+8.2%
Labour	Mary Waite	1,740	35.1%	−1.9%
Green	David Foster	507	10.2%	−2.1%
Liberal Democrats	Chris Burden	415	8.3%	−1.1%
UKIP	Matthew Plunkett	364	7.3%	−4.6%
Majority		181	0.3%	+6.7%
Turnout		4,947	68.2%	+29.2%
Conservative hold		Swing	+5%	

Church Ward
Party	Candidate	Votes	%	±%
Labour	Paul Richard Woodward	1,555	39.2%	−2.1%
Conservative	Paul Carnell	1,318	33.2%	+7.3%
UKIP	Bob Curtis	464	11.7%	−5.4%
Green	Neil Andrews	375	9.4%	−1.3%
Liberal Democrats	Kirsten Bayes	253	6.3%	+1.5%
Majority		237	5.9%	−9.4%
Turnout		3,965	58.9%	+30.9%
Labour hold		Swing	-4.7%	

Katesgrove Ward
Party	Candidate	Votes	%	±%
Labour	Matt Rodda	1,713	45.6%	−2.9%
Conservative	Syed Abbas	952	25.3%	+9.0%
Green	Louise Keane	516	13.7%	+0.1%
Liberal Democrats	Janel Blatter	335	8.9%	−0.4%
UKIP	Karin Cheetham	237	6.3%	−5.8%
Majority		761	20.2%	−12.0%
Turnout		3,753	56.2%	+28.2%
Labour hold		Swing	-5.9%	

Kentwood Ward
Party	Candidate	Votes	%	±%
Conservative	Tom Steele	2,037	43.5%	+12.7%
Labour	Gurvinder Kaur	1,538	32.8%	−3.1%
UKIP	Howard Thomas	582	12.4%	−9.4%
Green	Ruth Shaffrey	288	6.1%	−0.3%
Liberal Democrats	Jonathan Walls	234	5.0%	+0.1%
Majority		499	10.6%	+15.7%
Turnout		4,679	65%	+28%
Conservative hold		Swing	+7.9%	

Minster Ward
Party	Candidate	Votes	%	±%
Labour	Paul Stephen Gittings	2,082	46.0%	+1.7%
Conservative	Alanzo Nesta Seville	1,560	34.5%	+7.5%
Green	Keith Johnson	458	10.1%	−0.7%
UKIP	Patrick Dillon	419	9.2%	−5.0%
Majority		522	11.5%	−5.8%
Turnout		4,519	61.7%	+29.7%
Labour hold		Swing	-2.9%	

Note: The Liberal Democrats did not stand in this ward.

Norcot Ward
Party	Candidate	Votes	%	±%
Labour	Graeme William Hoskin	2,181	48.0%	−9.0%
Conservative	Rob Masterson	1,331	29.3%	+5.4%
UKIP	Philip Giles	520	11.4%	+11.4%
Green	Brent Smith	248	5.4%	−6.6%
Liberal Democrats	Annette Hendry	210	4.6%	−2.4%
Liberal	Stephen Graham	47	0.1%	+0.1%
Majority		850	18.7%	−14.4%
Turnout		4,537	61.8%	+29.8%
Labour hold		Swing	-7.0%	

Park Ward
Party	Candidate	Votes	%	±%
Green	Josh Williams	1,987	43.3%	−10.0%
Labour	Dave Dymond	1,652	36.0%	+6.1%
Conservative	Sarah Parkington	776	16.9%	+6.7%
Liberal Democrats	Rebecca Rye	172	3.7%	+1.1%
Majority		335	7.3%	−16.1%
Turnout		4,587	69.2%	+26.2%
Green hold		Swing	-8.0%	

Peppard Ward
Party	Candidate	Votes	%	±%
Conservative	Clare Grashoff	3,260	58.0%	+26.2%
Labour	Leighton Yeo	1,155	20.5%	+4.7%
Liberal Democrats	Madeleine Elizabeth Adams	706	12.5%	+7.8%
Green	Kate Day	498	8.8%	+3.1%
Majority		2,105	37.4%	+33.1%
Turnout		5,619	74.9%	+32.9%
Conservative hold		Swing	+10.7%	

Redlands Ward
Party	Candidate	Votes	%	±%
Labour	Jan Gavin	1,682	42.5%	−2.4%
Conservative	Helen Hopper	955	24.1%	+5.7%
Green	Kizzi Murtagh	804	20.3%	+5.9%
Liberal Democrats	Francis Jakeman	337	8.5%	−6.1%
UKIP	Robert Allan	175	4.4%	−3.0%
Majority		727	18.3%	−8.2%
Turnout		3,953	65.5%	+34.5%
Labour hold		Swing	-4.0%	

Southcote Ward
Party	Candidate	Votes	%	±%
Labour	Matt Lawrence	1,802	42.7%	−14.8%
Conservative	Russell Martin	1,476	34.9%	+6.9%
UKIP	John Combes	576	13.6%	+13.6%
Green	Doug Cresswell	187	4.4%	−5.1%
Liberal Democrats	Rodney Pinchen	179	4.2%	−0.7%
Majority		326	7.7%	−21.8%
Turnout		4,220	64.8%	+30.8%
Labour hold		Swing	-10.8%	

Thames Ward
Party	Candidate	Votes	%	±%
Conservative	Jeanette Mavis Skeats	3,037	52.2%	+6.7%
Labour	Richard Stainthorp	1,258	21.6%	−1.8%
Liberal Democrats	Guy Penman	609	10.4%	+1.5%
Green	Sarah McNamara	495	8.5%	−3.3%
UKIP	Cecilia Kelly	410	7.0%	+7.0%
Majority		1,779	30.6%	+8.6%
Turnout		5,809	78.8%	+34.8%
Conservative hold		Swing	+4.2%	

Tilehurst Ward
Party	Candidate	Votes	%	±%
Conservative	Sandra Doreen Vickers	1,944	39.9%	+16.3%
Labour	Matt Harrison	1,114	22.9%	+7.2%
Liberal Democrats	Jon Fanti	1,096	22.5%	−14.7%
UKIP	Ann Zebedee	532	10.9%	−8.5%
Green	Miriam Kennet	176	3.6%	−0.3%
Majority		830	17.0%	+30.5%
Turnout		4,862	68.6%	
Conservative hold		Swing	+15.5%	

Whitley Ward
Party	Candidate	Votes	%	±%
Labour	Kelly Liza Edwards	2,162	48.6%	−4.6%
Conservative	Nick Brown	1,260	28.3%	+6.0%
UKIP	Linda Giles	643	14.4%	+14.4%
Green	Stacey Hames	161	3.6%	−4.1%
Liberal Democrats	Margaret McNeill	147	3.3%	−0.9%
Independent	Jamie Wake	57	1.2%	−11.1%
TUSC	Fredrik Tillett	13	0.2%	+0.2%
Majority		902	20.3%	−10.6%
Turnout		4,443	54.3%	+28.3%
Labour hold		Swing	-5.3%	
