= 2024 Reading Borough Council election =

English local election

- 2 May 2024

16 out of 48 seats to Reading Borough Council 25 seats needed for a majority
- Turnout: 32.0% ▼0.6pp

| | First party | Second party | Third party |
|---|---|---|---|
| Leader | Jason Brock | Rob White | Clarence Mitchell |
| Party | Labour | Green | Conservative |
| Last election | 32 seats, 47.3% | 7 seats, 21.0% | 5 seats, 21.3% |
| Seats before | 32 | 7 | 5 |
| Seats after | 32 | 8 | 4 |
| Seat change | Steady | ▲1 | ▼1 |
| | Fourth party | Fifth party |
| Leader | James Moore |
| Party | Liberal Democrats | Independent |
| Last election | 3 seats, 9.7% | 1 seat, 0.2% |
| Seats before | 3 | 1 |
| Seats after | 3 | 1 |
| Seat change | Steady | Steady |
- Winner of each seat at the 2024 Reading Borough Council election
Leader before election
Jason Brock
Labour
Leader after election
Liz Terry
Labour

The 2024 Reading Borough Council election took place on 2 May 2024 to elect members of Reading Borough Council in Berkshire, England. This was on the same day as other local elections.

== Summary ==
Prior to the election, the council was under Labour majority control. The leader of the council, Jason Brock, did not stand for re-election in 2024.

The election saw Labour retain its majority on the council. Following the election, Labour chose Liz Terry to be their new group leader. She was formally appointed as leader of the council at the subsequent annual council meeting on 22 May 2024.

=== Election result ===
2024 Reading Borough Council election
| Party | This election | | | Full council | | | This election | | |
| Party | Seats | Net | Seats % | Other | Total | Total % | Votes | Votes % | +/− |
|---|---|---|---|---|---|---|---|---|---|
| Labour | 12 | Steady | 75.0 | 20 | 32 | 66.7 | 18,318 | 47.4 | +0.1 |
| Green | 3 | ▲1 | 18.8 | 5 | 8 | 16.7 | 8,042 | 20.8 | -0.2 |
| Conservative | 0 | ▼1 | 0.0 | 4 | 4 | 8.3 | 7,773 | 20.1 | -1.2 |
| Liberal Democrats | 1 | Steady | 6.3 | 2 | 3 | 6.3 | 3,966 | 10.3 | +0.6 |
| Independent | 0 | Steady | 0.0 | 1 | 1 | 2.1 | 45 | 0.1 | -0.1 |
| TUSC | 0 | Steady | 0.0 | 0 | 0 | 0.0 | 296 | 0.8 | +0.4 |
| Reform | 0 | Steady | 0.0 | 0 | 0 | 0.0 | 182 | 0.5 | N/A |
| Liberal | 0 | Steady | 0.0 | 0 | 0 | 0.0 | 39 | 0.1 | ±0.0 |

== Ward results ==
The Statement of Persons Nominated, which details the candidates standing in each ward, was released by Reading Borough Council following the close of nominations on 8 April 2024. Votes were counted overnighted and the results published on the council's website on 3 May.

=== Abbey ===
Abbey
| Party | Candidate | Votes | % | ±% |
|---|---|---|---|---|
| Labour | David Stevens | 820 | 44.2 | −8.5 |
| Conservative | Santhosh Batchu | 594 | 32.0 | +12.2 |
| Green | Jamie Whitham | 250 | 13.5 | −3.5 |
| Liberal Democrats | Henry Wright | 177 | 9.6 | −1.0 |
| Majority | | 226 | 12.2 | −20.7 |
| Turnout | | 1,854 | 27.8 | +4.3 |
| Registered electors | | 6,689 | | |
| Labour hold | | Swing | +10.4 | |

=== Battle ===
Battle
| Party | Candidate | Votes | % | ±% |
|---|---|---|---|---|
| Labour | Wendy Griffith* | 1,290 | 63.8 | −1.6 |
| Green | Tahira Kulsoom | 386 | 19.1 | +6.9 |
| Conservative | Abdoulaye Sow | 210 | 10.4 | −4.0 |
| Liberal Democrats | John Grout | 136 | 6.7 | −1.4 |
| Majority | | 904 | 44.7 | −6.3 |
| Turnout | | 2,022 | 26.8 | −1.2 |
| Registered electors | | 7,648 | | |
| Labour hold | | Swing | -4.3 | |

=== Caversham ===
Caversham
| Party | Candidate | Votes | % | ±% |
|---|---|---|---|---|
| Labour | Matt Yeo* | 1,603 | 55.2 | +1.6 |
| Conservative | Grace Taylor | 494 | 17.0 | −2.5 |
| Green | Anthea West | 441 | 15.2 | −1.0 |
| Liberal Democrats | Christopher Burden | 305 | 10.5 | −0.2 |
| TUSC | Chloe-Anne Stoakes | 61 | 2.1 | New |
| Majority | | 1,109 | 38.2 | +4.1 |
| Turnout | | 2,902 | 38.4 | −0.7 |
| Registered electors | | 7,595 | | |
| Labour hold | | Swing | +2.1 | |

=== Caversham Heights ===
Caversham Heights
| Party | Candidate | Votes | % | ±% |
|---|---|---|---|---|
| Labour | Jenny McGrother | 1,405 | 41.2 | +0.2 |
| Conservative | Paul Carnell | 1,183 | 34.7 | −2.6 |
| Green | Danny McNamara | 597 | 17.5 | +3.4 |
| Liberal Democrats | Vania Costa-Krol | 225 | 6.6 | −1.0 |
| Majority | | 222 | 6.5 | +2.8 |
| Turnout | | 3,410 | 45.7 | −1.9 |
| Registered electors | | 7,507 | | |
| Labour hold | | Swing | +1.4 | |

=== Church ===
Church
| Party | Candidate | Votes | % | ±% |
|---|---|---|---|---|
| Labour Co-op | Andrew Hornsby-Smith* | 1,241 | 59.1 | −2.3 |
| Conservative | Adam Phelps | 453 | 21.6 | −0.1 |
| Green | Brent Smith | 263 | 12.5 | +2.9 |
| Liberal Democrats | Mark Cole | 143 | 6.8 | −0.6 |
| Majority | | 788 | 37.5 | −2.2 |
| Turnout | | 2,100 | 25.3 | 0.0 |
| Registered electors | | 8,361 | | |
| Labour Co-op hold | | Swing | -1.1 | |

=== Coley ===
Coley
| Party | Candidate | Votes | % | ±% |
|---|---|---|---|---|
| Labour Co-op | Liz Terry* | 1,232 | 54.8 | −3.1 |
| Conservative | Casey George Christopher Byrne | 444 | 19.7 | −0.9 |
| Green | Isobel Hoskins | 287 | 12.8 | +0.9 |
| Liberal Democrats | Jon Hill | 190 | 8.4 | −1.1 |
| TUSC | Sadiqua Khan | 96 | 4.3 | New |
| Majority | | 788 | 35.0 | −2.3 |
| Turnout | | 2,249 | 31.6 | −0.4 |
| Registered electors | | 7,157 | | |
| Labour Co-op hold | | Swing | -1.1 | |

=== Emmer Green ===
Emmer Green
| Party | Candidate | Votes | % | ±% |
|---|---|---|---|---|
| Labour | Daya Pal Singh | 1,148 | 40.8 | +4.0 |
| Conservative | Simon Robinson* | 1,035 | 36.7 | −3.3 |
| Green | Wendy Rooke | 376 | 13.3 | +1.0 |
| Liberal Democrats | Pieter de Boiserie | 258 | 9.2 | −1.7 |
| Majority | | 113 | 4.0 | +7.2 |
| Turnout | | 2,817 | 37.2 | −3.5 |
| Registered electors | | 7,634 | | |
| Labour gain from Conservative | | Swing | +3.7 | |

=== Katesgrove ===
Katesgrove
| Party | Candidate | Votes | % | ±% |
|---|---|---|---|---|
| Green | Kate Nikulina | 1,045 | 44.7 | −2.3 |
| Labour | Navjit Kaur Gill | 861 | 36.8 | −0.5 |
| Conservative | John Angus | 240 | 10.3 | +0.8 |
| Liberal Democrats | Margaret McNeill | 115 | 4.9 | +1.3 |
| Independent | Jean-Louis Pascual | 27 | 1.2 | New |
| TUSC | Sam Church | 25 | 1.1 | −1.5 |
| Independent | Michael Jeffrey Turberville | 18 | 0.8 | New |
| Majority | | 184 | 7.9 | −1.8 |
| Turnout | | 2,340 | 29.9 | +0.4 |
| Registered electors | | 7,825 | | |
| Green gain from Labour | | Swing | -0.9 | |

=== Kentwood ===
Kentwood
| Party | Candidate | Votes | % | ±% |
|---|---|---|---|---|
| Labour | Mark Keeping* | 1,136 | 48.1 | +8.8 |
| Conservative | Nick Fudge | 852 | 36.1 | −9.2 |
| Green | Caroline Hearst | 240 | 10.2 | +2.1 |
| Liberal Democrats | Riccardo Mancuso-Marcello | 134 | 5.7 | −1.5 |
| Majority | | 284 | 12.0 | +18.0 |
| Turnout | | 2,362 | 35.3 | −3.0 |
| Registered electors | | 6,720 | | |
| Labour hold | | Swing | +9.0 | |

=== Norcot ===
Norcot
| Party | Candidate | Votes | % | ±% |
|---|---|---|---|---|
| Labour | Mamuna Naz | 1,100 | 50.4 | −7.6 |
| Conservative | Lizzy Sheppard | 306 | 14.0 | −3.9 |
| Liberal Democrats | Marie French | 303 | 13.9 | +7.6 |
| Green | Richard Walkem | 215 | 9.9 | 0.0 |
| Reform | Alan Gulliver | 182 | 8.3 | New |
| Liberal | Stephen Graham | 39 | 1.8 | −1.0 |
| TUSC | Jen Bottom | 36 | 1.7 | −0.2 |
| Majority | | 794 | 36.4 | −3.7 |
| Turnout | | 2,181 | 28.7 | +1.1 |
| Registered electors | | 7,636 | | |
| Labour hold | | Swing | -1.9 | |

=== Park ===
Park
| Party | Candidate | Votes | % | ±% |
|---|---|---|---|---|
| Green | Sarah Magon* | 1,569 | 57.6 | +2.9 |
| Labour | Ollie Williamson | 915 | 33.6 | −5.1 |
| Conservative | James Mugo | 157 | 5.8 | 0.0 |
| Liberal Democrats | Chris Dodson | 71 | 2.6 | −0.5 |
| Majority | | 654 | 24.0 | +8.0 |
| Turnout | | 2,725 | 38.4 | −2.1 |
| Registered electors | | 7,093 | | |
| Green hold | | Swing | +4.0 | |

=== Redlands ===
Redlands
| Party | Candidate | Votes | % | ±% |
|---|---|---|---|---|
| Green | Dave McElroy* | 1,478 | 53.9 | +13.7 |
| Labour Co-op | Sunila Lobo | 921 | 33.6 | −12.8 |
| Conservative | Richard Williams | 182 | 6.6 | −0.9 |
| Liberal Democrats | Francis Jakeman | 101 | 3.7 | −0.7 |
| TUSC | Melanie Dent | 42 | 1.5 | +0.1 |
| Majority | | 557 | 20.3 | +26.5 |
| Turnout | | 2,742 | 32.8 | +1.5 |
| Registered electors | | 8,363 | | |
| Green hold | | Swing | +13.3 | |

=== Southcote ===
Southcote
| Party | Candidate | Votes | % | ±% |
|---|---|---|---|---|
| Labour | Graeme Hoskin † | 1,354 | 59.6 | −1.2 |
| Conservative | Allison Carnell | 439 | 19.3 | −3.6 |
| Green | Josie Downey | 247 | 10.9 | +1.6 |
| Liberal Democrats | Benjamin Sims | 212 | 9.3 | +3.6 |
| Majority | | 915 | 40.3 | +2.4 |
| Turnout | | 2,270 | 29.2 | −1.9 |
| Registered electors | | 7,765 | | |
| Labour hold | | Swing | +1.2 | |

† Incumbent councillor for Norcot ward.

=== Thames ===
Thames
| Party | Candidate | Votes | % | ±% |
|---|---|---|---|---|
| Labour | Richard Davies* | 1,015 | 52.6 | +1.1 |
| Conservative | Shivraj Hawaldar | 347 | 18.5 | −1.9 |
| Green | Mike Harling | 315 | 16.3 | +1.1 |
| Liberal Democrats | Jo Ramsay | 235 | 12.2 | +0.3 |
| Majority | | 668 | 34.6 | +3.5 |
| Turnout | | 1930 | 31.9 | −1.0 |
| Registered electors | | 6,054 | | |
| Labour hold | | Swing | +1.5 | |

=== Tilehurst ===
Tilehurst
| Party | Candidate | Votes | % | ±% |
|---|---|---|---|---|
| Liberal Democrats | James Moore* | 1,186 | 52.1 | +1.2 |
| Labour Co-op | Elliott Gardiner | 480 | 21.1 | 0.0 |
| Conservative | Ben Blackmore | 436 | 19.2 | −1.8 |
| Green | Gabriel Berry-Khan | 154 | 6.8 | −0.2 |
| Majority | | 706 | 31.0 | +1.2 |
| Turnout | | 2,275 | 31.3 | −0.2 |
| Registered electors | | 7,269 | | |
| Liberal Democrats hold | | Swing | +0.6 | |

=== Whitley ===
Whitley
| Party | Candidate | Votes | % | ±% |
|---|---|---|---|---|
| Labour | Micky Leng* | 1,091 | 57.7 | −3.6 |
| Conservative | Vani Goel | 401 | 21.1 | +0.1 |
| Green | Kathleen Smith | 179 | 9.5 | +1.7 |
| Liberal Democrats | Thomas Weir | 175 | 9.2 | −0.5 |
| TUSC | Saffi Hussam | 36 | 1.9 | New |
| Majority | | 690 | 36.5 | −3.7 |
| Turnout | | 1,892 | 23.7 | +0.2 |
| Registered electors | | 7,980 | | |
| Labour hold | | Swing | -1.9 | |
