= 2023 Reading Borough Council election =

2023 UK local government election

- 4 May 2023

17 out of 48 seats to Reading Borough Council 25 seats needed for a majority
- Turnout: 32.6% ▼2.0pp

	First party	Second party	Third party
Leader	Jason Brock	Rob White	Clarence Mitchell
Party	Labour	Green	Conservative
Last election	32 seats, 47.3%	7 seats, 16.8%	6 seats, 26.3%
Seats before	31	7 (Note: Including one vacant seat in Park ward previously held by the Greens.)	6
Seats won	11	3	2
Seats after	32	7	5
Seat change	▲1	Steady	▼1
	Fourth party	Fifth party
Leader	Meri O'Connell
Party	Liberal Democrats	Independent
Last election	3 seats, 9.2%	0 seats, 0.2%
Seats before	3	1
Seats won	1	0
Seats after	3	1
Seat change	Steady	Steady
- Winner of each seat at the 2023 Reading Borough Council election
Leader before election
Jason Brock
Labour
Leader after election
Jason Brock
Labour

The 2023 Reading Borough Council election was held on 4 May 2023 to elect members of Reading Borough Council in Berkshire, England. It coincided with local elections across England. There were 17 of the 48 seats on the council up for election, being the usual third of the council plus a by-election in Park ward following the resignation of Green councillor Brenda McGonigle.

Labour retained its majority on the council. Only one seat changed party at this election, being a Labour gain from the Conservatives in Caversham Heights ward. All other seats were unchanged, with the Greens regaining their vacant seat in Park ward.

A by-election was held on 3 August 2023 following the death of a Norcot councillor. Labour retained the seat with a marginally increased share of the vote.

== Summary ==
=== Election result ===
2023 Reading Borough Council election
Party	This election			Full council			This election		
Party	Seats	Net	Seats %	Other	Total	Total %	Votes	Votes %	+/−
Labour	11	▲1	64.7	21	32	66.7	19,352	47.3	±0.0
Green	3	Steady	17.6	4	7	14.6	8,595	21.0	+4.2
Conservative	2	▼1	11.8	3	5	10.4	8,722	21.3	-5.0
Liberal Democrats	1	Steady	5.9	2	3	6.3	3,983	9.7	+0.5
Independent	0	Steady	0.0	1	1	2.1	71	0.2	±0.0
TUSC	0	Steady	0.0	0	0	0.0	164	0.4	+0.2
Liberal	0	Steady	0.0	0	0	0.0	57	0.1	N/A

== Ward results ==
The Statement of Persons Nominated was published on 5 April 2023. Votes were counted overnight and the results posted on the Council's website on 5 May.

=== Abbey ===
Abbey
Party	Candidate	Votes	%	±%
Labour	Mohammed Ayub*	819	52.7	−3.4
Conservative	Simon James Bazley	308	19.8	+2.3
Green	Howard John Darby	264	17.0	−12.3
Liberal Democrats	Steven Adam Gore	163	10.5	−8.5
Majority		511	32.9	
Turnout		1,566	23.5	
Labour hold		Swing		

=== Battle ===
Battle
Party	Candidate	Votes	%	±%
Labour Co-op	Amjad Iqbal Tahir Tarar	1,374	65.4	+6.4
Conservative	John Tattersall Murray	302	14.4	+0.1
Green	Callum Louis Harling	256	12.2	−8.9
Liberal Democrats	John Berkeley Grout	170	8.1	−5.2
Majority		1,072	51.0	
Turnout		2,115	28.0	
Labour Co-op hold		Swing		

=== Caversham ===
Caversham
Party	Candidate	Votes	%	±%
Labour	Jan Gavin*	1,563	53.6	+4.1
Conservative	Saadia Zafar Saadat	569	19.5	−2.0
Green	Mark Peter Timothy Palmer	473	16.2	−10.5
Liberal Democrats	Christopher Simon Burden	311	10.7	−5.9
Majority		994	34.1	
Turnout		2,937	39.1	
Labour hold		Swing		

=== Caversham Heights ===
Caversham Heights
Party	Candidate	Votes	%	±%
Labour Co-op	Sam Juthani	1,454	41.0	+10.7
Conservative	Paul Alan Carnell*	1,324	37.3	+1.7
Green	Danny McNamara	500	14.1	−9.9
Liberal Democrats	Vania Costa-Krol	270	7.6	−17.3
Majority		130	3.7	
Turnout		3,563	47.6	
Labour Co-op gain from Conservative		Swing		

=== Church ===
Church
Party	Candidate	Votes	%	±%
Labour	Paul Richard Woodward*	1,268	61.4	+9.7
Conservative	James Mwaniki Mugo	448	21.7	−16.0
Green	Brent Smith	198	9.6	−7.4
Liberal Democrats	Mark Clifford Cole	152	7.4	−5.8
Majority		820	39.7	
Turnout		2,083	25.3	
Labour hold		Swing		

=== Coley ===
Coley
Party	Candidate	Votes	%	±%
Labour	Paul Stephen Gittings*	1,297	57.9	−2.4
Conservative	Lizzy Sheppard	462	20.6	−2.4
Green	Isobel Claire Hoskins	267	11.9	−12.0
Liberal Democrats	Benjamin Francis Sims	213	9.5	−8.7
Majority		835	37.3	
Turnout		2,252	32.0	
Labour hold		Swing		

=== Emmer Green ===
Emmer Green
Party	Candidate	Votes	%	±%
Conservative	Stephen James Goss	1,233	40.0	−0.7
Labour	Matt Buckley	1,133	36.8	−1.9
Green	Wendy Jane Rooke	378	12.3	−15.5
Liberal Democrats	Pieter Herman M De Boiserie	336	10.9	−11.0
Majority		100	3.2	
Turnout		3,095	40.7	
Conservative hold		Swing		

=== Katesgrove ===
Katesgrove
Party	Candidate	Votes	%	±%
Green	Doug Cresswell*	1,048	47.0	+4.6
Labour Co-op	Marg Cobb	832	37.3	+3.4
Conservative	Ian Binge	213	9.5	−1.5
Liberal Democrats	Margaret McNeill	80	3.6	−4.1
TUSC	Lily Jayne Challice	58	2.6	N/A
Majority		216	9.7	
Turnout		2,257	29.5	
Green hold		Swing		

=== Kentwood ===
Kentwood
Party	Candidate	Votes	%	±%
Conservative	Raj Singh*	1,171	45.3	+5.4
Labour	Mamuna Naz	1,016	39.3	+0.4
Green	Caroline Hearst	209	8.1	−4.6
Liberal Democrats	Jonathan Peter Barker	187	7.2	−4.1
Majority		155	6.0	
Turnout		2,583	38.3	
Conservative hold		Swing		

=== Norcot ===
Norcot
Party	Candidate	Votes	%	±%
Labour	Colette Lolita Dennis*	1,202	58.0	+1.2
Conservative	Suzanne Rowe	371	17.9	−0.8
Green	Richard Peter Walkem	206	9.9	−8.6
Liberal Democrats	Christopher Ward	126	6.1	−5.9
Independent	Alan John Gulliver	71	3.4	−4.6
Liberal	Stephen Anthony Graham	57	2.8	N/A
TUSC	Jen Bottom	39	1.9	−3.1
Majority		831	40.1	
Turnout		2,082	27.6	
Labour hold		Swing		

=== Park ===
Park (2 seats due to by-election)
Party	Candidate	Votes	%	±%
Green	Josh Williams*	1,536	54.7	+5.9
Green	Sarah Magon	1,408	50.1	−2.0
Labour	Ram Bahadur Galami	1,087	38.7	+3.6
Labour	Ollie Williamson	1,070	38.1	+7.3
Conservative	Adam Iestyn Phelps	164	5.8	−1.5
Conservative	Allison Carnell	160	5.7	−0.8
Liberal Democrats	Chris Dodson	86	3.1	−0.8
Liberal Democrats	Henry David Wright	57	2.0	N/A
Turnout		2,842	40.5	
Green hold		Swing		
Green hold		Swing		

The by-election in Park ward was triggered by the resignation of Green councillor Brenda McGonigle in March 2023.

=== Redlands ===
Redlands
Party	Candidate	Votes	%	±%
Labour Co-op	Will Cross*	1,194	46.4	+5.1
Green	Kate Nikulina	1,034	40.2	+0.2
Conservative	Abdoulaye Diouma Sow	193	7.5	−2.3
Liberal Democrats	Francis David Jakeman	114	4.4	−1.8
TUSC	Melanie Samantha Jayne Dent	36	1.4	N/A
Majority		160	6.2	
Turnout		2,590	31.3	
Labour Co-op hold		Swing		

=== Southcote ===
Southcote
Party	Candidate	Votes	%	±%
Labour	John Joseph Ennis*	1,454	60.8	+6.2
Conservative	Ben Michael Brereton Blackmore	547	22.9	−0.4
Green	Jamie Whitham	223	9.3	−7.1
Liberal Democrats	Riccardo Giovanni Mancuso-Marcello	136	5.7	−5.7
TUSC	Neil Robert Adams	31	1.3	−2.1
Majority		907	37.9	
Turnout		2,413	31.1	
Labour hold		Swing		

=== Thames ===
Thames
Party	Candidate	Votes	%	±%
Labour	Ama Asare	997	51.5	−1.1
Conservative	Shivraj Hawaldar	395	20.4	−3.5
Green	Mike Harling	295	15.2	−10.8
Liberal Democrats	Jo Ramsay	248	12.8	−2.3
Majority		602	31.1	
Turnout		1,948	32.9	
Labour hold		Swing		

=== Tilehurst ===
Tilehurst
Party	Candidate	Votes	%	±%
Liberal Democrats	Anne Thompson*	1,158	50.9	+6.3
Labour Co-op	Len Middleton	481	21.1	+4.9
Conservative	Casey George Christopher Byrne	479	21.0	−4.0
Green	Gabriel Berry-Khan	159	7.0	−3.8
Majority		677	29.8	
Turnout		2,282	31.5	
Liberal Democrats hold		Swing		

=== Whitley ===
Whitley
Party	Candidate	Votes	%	±%
Labour Co-op	Alice Mpofu-Coles*	1,111	61.3	+5.0
Conservative	Vani Goel	383	21.1	+0.1
Liberal Democrats	Sarah Lucy Dobson	176	9.7	−1.5
Green	Kathy Smith	141	7.8	−7.8
Majority		728	40.2	
Turnout		1,822	23.5	
Labour Co-op hold		Swing		

== By-Elections ==
Due to the death of Norcot councillor Colette Dennis in summer 2023, a by-election was held for her seat on Reading Borough Council on the 3rd of August. The by-election was won by Labour, with the Liberal Democrats leapfrogging the Conservatives and the Greens into second place.

Norcot By-Election
Party	Candidate	Votes	%	±%
Labour	Finn McGoldrick	929	58.2	+0.2
Liberal Democrats	Marie French	280	17.5	+11.4
Conservative	Lizzy Sheppard	209	13.1	−4.8
Green	Richard Peter Walkem	101	6.3	−3.6
Independent	Alan John Gulliver	47	3.1	−0.4
TUSC	Jen Bottom	28	1.8	−0.1
Majority		649	40.6	+0.5
Turnout		1,598	21.1	−6.5
Labour hold		Swing		
