= Church (Reading ward) =

Electoral ward in Reading, Berkshire, England

Coordinates: 51.432°N 0.958°W

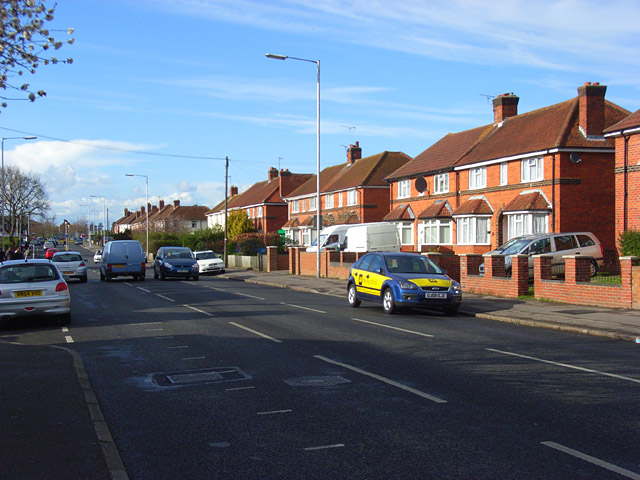
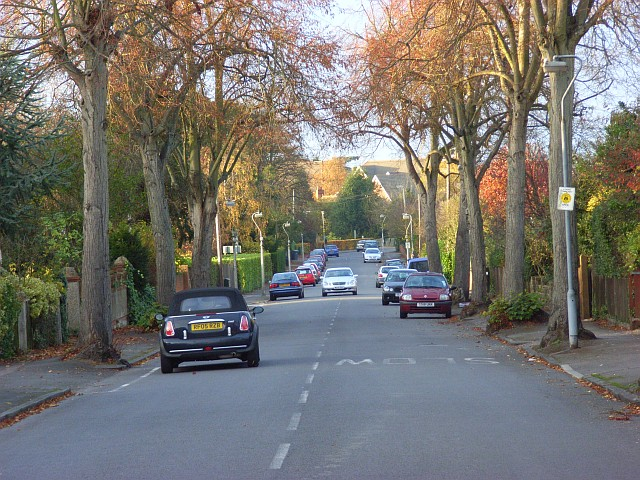
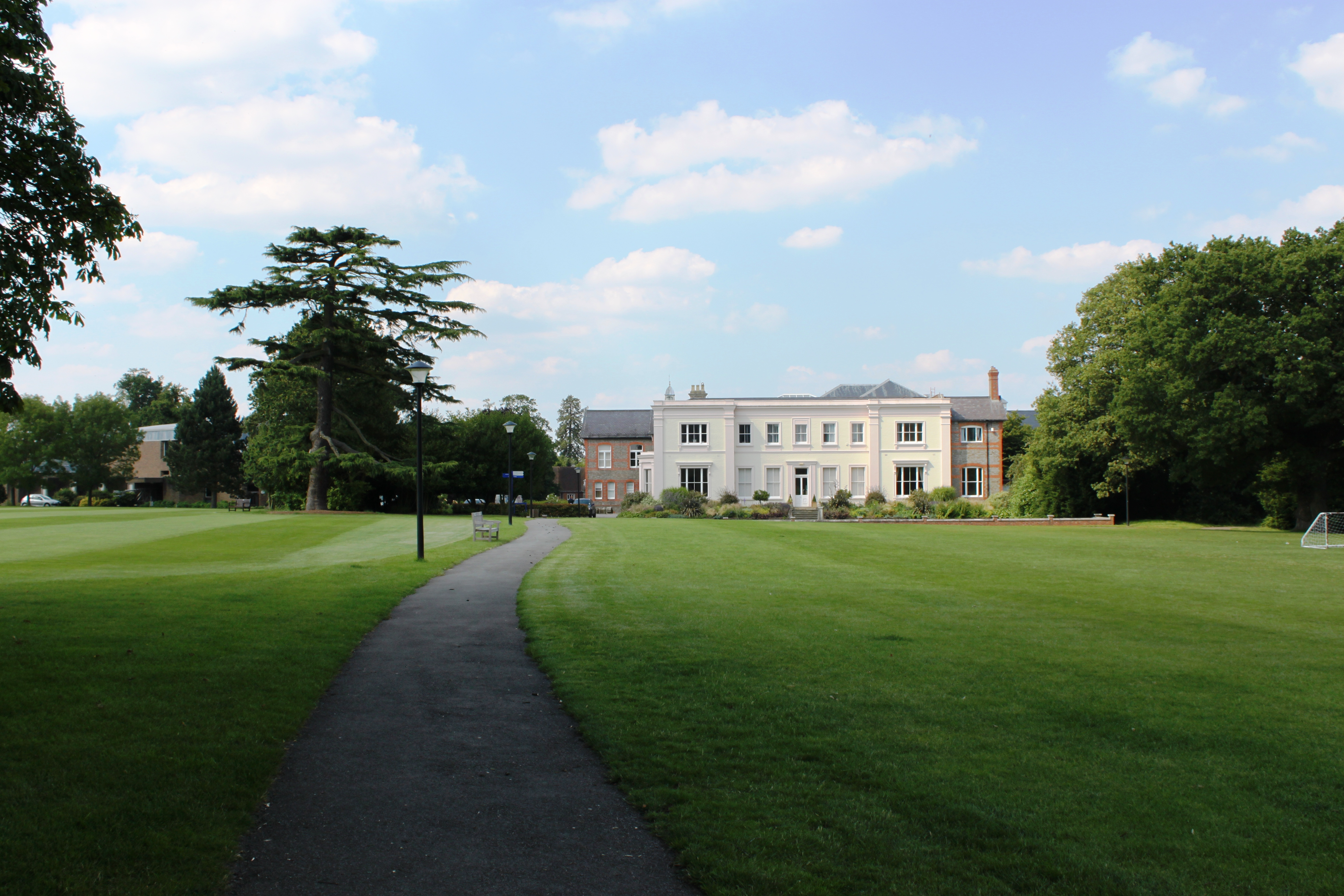
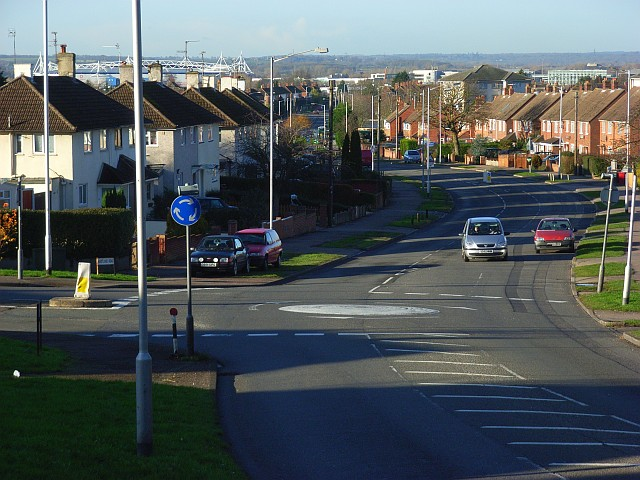
- Clockwise from top left: Northumberland Avenue, Northcourt Avenue, Hartland Road, the Old School at Leighton Park

- Location within Berkshire
- Area: 2.943 km^{2} (1.136 sq mi)
- Population: 12,378
  - Density: 4,206/km^{2} (10,890/sq mi)
- OS grid reference: SU724709
- Unitary authority: Reading
- Ceremonial county: Berkshire
- Region: South East
- Country: England
- Sovereign state: United Kingdom
- Police: Thames Valley
- Fire: Royal Berkshire
- Ambulance: South Central
- UK Parliament: Earley and Woodley

Church is an electoral ward of the Borough of Reading, in the English county of Berkshire.

In a set of boundary changes in 2022, the boundaries of Church ward were significantly changed, losing areas to both Redlands and Whitley wards, whilst gaining a considerable area from Whitley ward west of Northumberland Avenue. One rather strange consequence of this is that the geographical centre of the suburban neighbourhood of Whitley, as depicted on Ordnance Survey maps, now lies in Church ward rather than Whitley ward.

== Location ==
The ward covers an area south and south-east of the town centre. From the south in clockwise order the ward is bounded by Whitley Wood Road and the backs of the houses on the south side of Hartland Road and then by Basingstoke Road as far as the junction of Long Barn Lane, which it follows as far as Northumberland Avenue. It follows Northumberland Avenue north to a point just after Reading Girls School before cutting behind houses to Northcourt Avenue, which it follows to College Green.

The ward boundary then follows Shinfield Road south to Pepper Lane, and follows that to the borough boundary, which it follows back to Whitley Wood Road. The borough boundary forms a somewhat eratic course, but takes in a small portion of the University of Reading's Whiteknights Campus (principally the Art, Biomedical Engineering and Computer Science buildings), and the whole of the site of Leighton Park School.

The ward is surrounded, in the same order, by Whitley, Katesgrove and Redlands wards of Reading Borough Council, and by the civil parishes of Earley and Shinfield in Wokingham. The whole of the ward lies within the Earley and Woodley parliamentary constituency.

== Profile ==
=== Demographics ===
As of 2024, Church ward had an area of 2.943 square kilometres (1.136 sq mi) and there were 12,378 people living there. Of these, 20.7% were under 15 and 12.5% were 65 and over; 62.6% classified themselves as White, 20.3% as Asian, and 5.9% as Black, Caribbean or African; 29.3% were born outside the UK.

The population lived in 4,210 households, of which 12.3% were in a flat, maisonette or apartment, and 87.8% were in a house or bungalow. Of the households, 20.5% were owned outright by the residents, 26.5% were owned subject to a mortgage, loan or shared ownership, 16.9% were privately rented and 36.0% were socially rented.

Of the population aged over 16, 59.3% were in employment, 4.8% were unemployed, and 35.9% were economically inactive. Of those in employment, 32.4% were in managerial, professional or technical occupations. A total of 39.3% of the population were educated to university degree level.

=== Environment ===
As of 2022, Church ward had a tree canopy cover of 20.1%, compared to figures of 17.7% for the Reading as a whole, and 16.5% for the United Kingdom. The most significant open spaces are the John Rabson Recreation Ground and the adjacent Cowsey woodland.

=== Facilities ===
The ward includes the Ridgeway and Whitley Park primary schools, and Hartland High, Reading Girls' and Leighton Park secondary schools.

== Representation ==
As with all Reading wards, the ward elects three councillors to Reading Borough Council. Elections since 2004 are generally held by thirds, with elections in three years out of four. The ward councillors are currently Andrew Hornsby-Smith, Ruth McEwan and Paul Woodward, who are all members of the Labour party.
