= Reading Borough Council =

Local authority in Berkshire, England

- Coat of arms

- Council logo

Type
- Type: Unitary authority

Leadership
- Mayor: Paul Gittings, Labour since 27 May 2026
- Leader: Liz Terry, Labour since 22 May 2024
- Chief Executive: Jackie Yates since October 2022

Structure
- Seats: 48 councillors
- Political groups: Administration (29) Labour (29) Other parties (19) Green (11) Conservative (5) Liberal Democrats (3)
- Length of term: 4 years

Elections
- Voting system: Plurality-at-large
- Last election: 7 May 2026

Motto
- A Deo et Regina

Meeting place
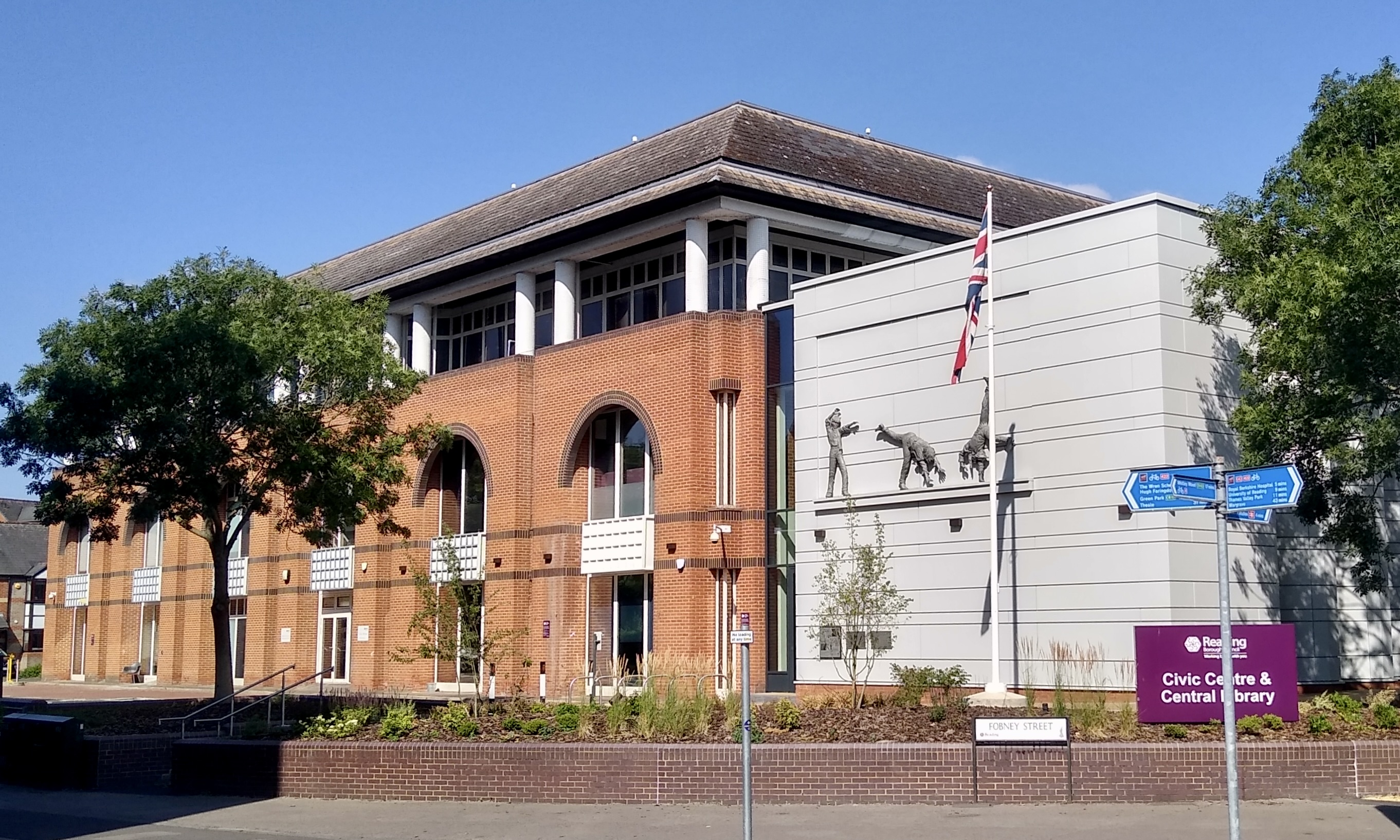
- Civic Centre, Bridge Street, Reading, RG1 2LU

Website
- www.reading.gov.uk

Reading Borough Council is the local authority for Reading in the county of Berkshire, England. Reading has had a council since at least 1542, which has been reformed on numerous occasions. Since 1998, the council has been a unitary authority, being a district council which also performs the functions of a county council.

The council has been under Labour majority control since 2012. It is based at the Civic Offices on Bridge Street in the town centre.

== History ==
The town of Reading was an ancient borough, being described as a borough by the time of the Domesday Book in 1086. The borough was initially controlled by Reading Abbey, but the town gradually gained a degree of independence from the abbey from the thirteenth century onwards. Following the dissolution of the abbey in 1538 the borough was granted a new charter in 1542.

The borough was reformed in 1836 to become a municipal borough under the Municipal Corporations Act 1835, which standardised how most boroughs operated across the country. It was then governed by a body formally called the 'mayor, aldermen and burgesses of the borough of Reading', generally known as the corporation, town council or borough council. When elected county councils were established in 1889 under the Local Government Act 1888, Reading was considered large enough to provide its own county-level services, and so it was made a county borough, independent from Berkshire County Council.

When the town became a county borough in 1889 the borough comprised the three civil parishes of St Giles, St Laurence, and St Mary. The three civil parishes were united into a single parish called Reading in 1905 covering the same area as the borough. The borough and parish of Reading were significantly enlarged in 1911, gaining the former Caversham Urban District from Oxfordshire, and also gaining a large part of the neighbouring parish of Tilehurst.

The Local Government Act 1972 reconstituted Reading as a non-metropolitan district with effect from 1 April 1974; it kept the same boundaries and its borough status, allowing the chair of the council to take the title of mayor, but there were changes to the council's responsibilities. In particular, it became a lower-tier district authority, with Berkshire County Council providing county-level services in the town for the first time.

The county council was abolished in 1998. Reading Borough Council then became a unitary authority, taking over the former county council's functions in the borough.

== Governance ==
As a unitary authority, Reading Borough Council delivers all local government services in the area. There are no civil parishes in the borough, which has been an unparished area since the 1974 reforms. Since the abolition of Berkshire County Council in 1998 some county-wide functions such as the Royal Berkshire Fire and Rescue Service have been administered by joint committees of the county's six district councils. Reading Borough Council has adopted the committee system of governance.

=== Political control ===
The council has been under Labour majority control since 2012.

Political control of the council since the 1974 reforms took effect has been as follows:

Non-metropolitan district

Party in control	Years
No overall control	1974–1983
Conservative	1983–1986
No overall control	1986–1987
Labour	1987–1998

Unitary authority

Party in control	Years
Labour	1998–2008
No overall control	2008–2012
Labour	2012–present

=== Leadership ===
The role of mayor is largely ceremonial in Reading. Political leadership is instead provided by the leader of the council. After local government reorganisation in 1974, the leading political role was the chair of the policy committee, which was informally called the leader of the council. The role of leader of the council was made a formal position following the Local Government Act 2000. The leaders of Reading Borough Council since 1974 have been:

Councillor	Party	From	To
Jim Day	Liberal	1974	1976
Deryck Morton	Conservative	1976	1986
Mike Orton	Labour	1986	1995
David Sutton	Labour	1995	May 2008
Jo Lovelock	Labour	20 May 2008	May 2010
Andrew Cumpsty	Conservative	25 May 2010	May 2011
Jo Lovelock	Labour	25 May 2011	May 2019
Jason Brock	Labour	22 May 2019	May 2024
Liz Terry	Labour	22 May 2024	

=== Composition ===
Following the 2026 election, the composition of the council was:

Party	Seats
Labour	29
Green	11
Conservative	5
Liberal Democrats	3
Total	48

The next election is due in May 2027.

== Elections ==
Since the last boundary changes in 2022 the council has comprised 48 councillors representing 16 wards, with each ward electing three councillors. Elections are held three years out of every four, with a third of the council (one councillor for each ward) being elected each time for a four-year term.

=== Wards ===
Reading's councillors are elected by 16 wards:

- Abbey
- Battle
- Caversham
- Caversham Heights
- Church
- Coley
- Emmer Green
- Katesgrove
- Kentwood
- Norcot
- Park
- Redlands
- Southcote
- Thames
- Tilehurst
- Whitley

== Premises ==
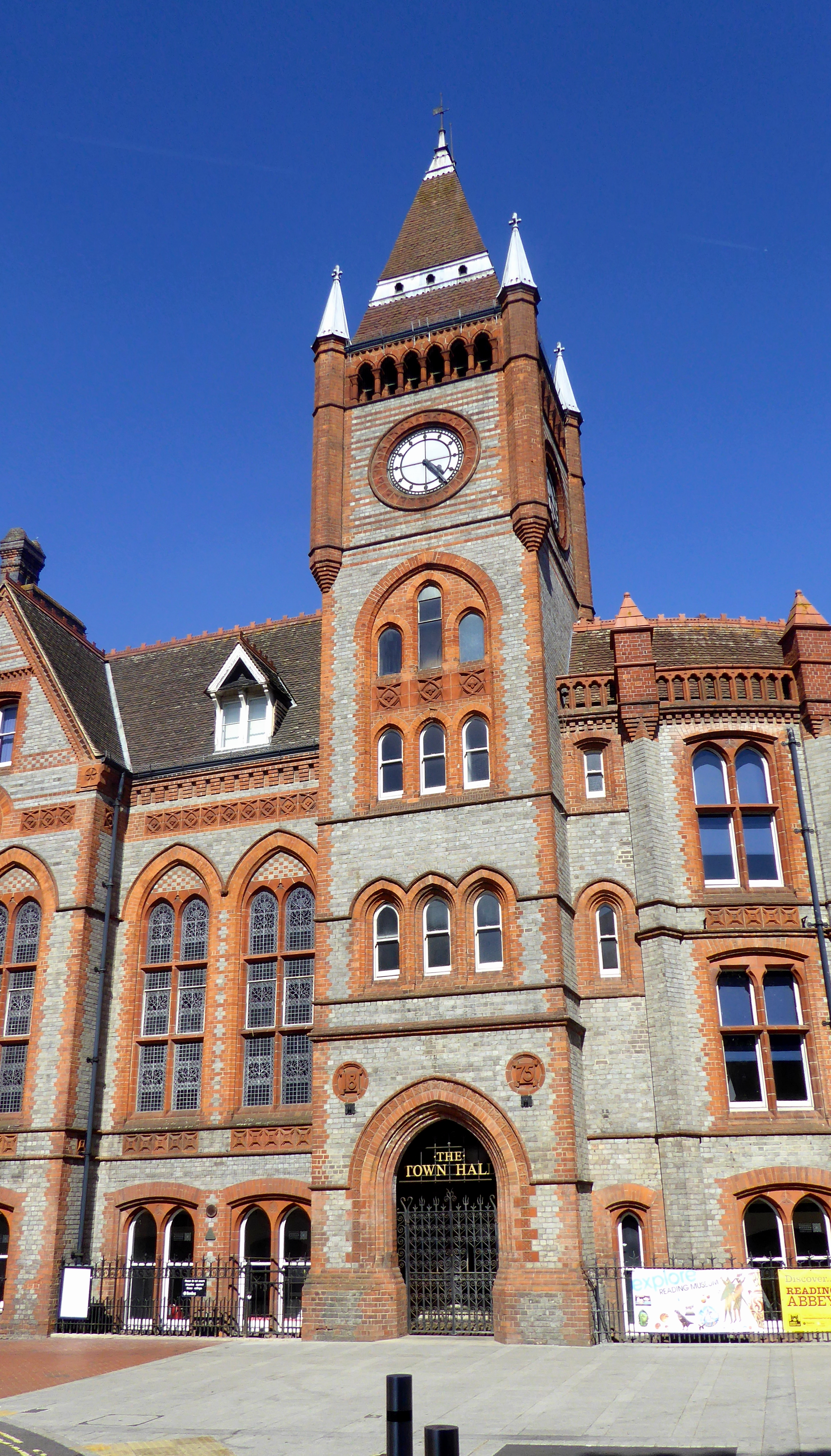
Reading Town Hall: Former headquarters, still used for council's annual meeting.

Since 2014 the council has been based at offices on Bridge Street, now called the Civic Centre.

Reading's historic Town Hall on Blagrave Street was built in phases between 1786 and 1897, and served as the headquarters of the borough council until 1976. The council's annual meeting when new mayors are appointed continues to be held at the Town Hall. In 1976 the council moved to a new Civic Centre off Castle Street, adjoining other facilities including a police station, magistrates' court, and The Hexagon theatre.

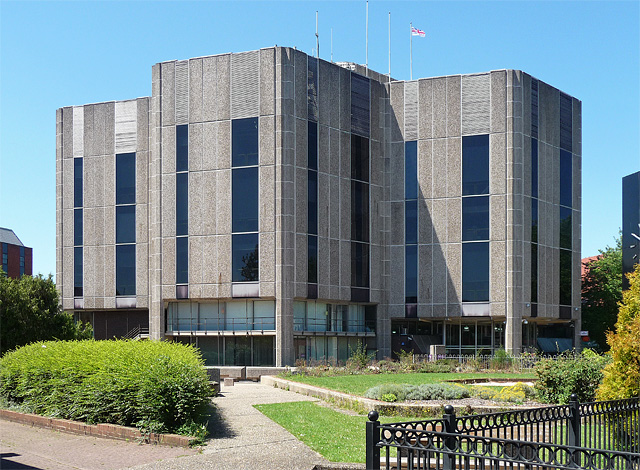
Civic Centre: Council's headquarters 1976–2014

By 2013 the council's offices at the civic centre were deemed to be at the end of their design life. The council purchased an existing building called Plaza West on Bridge Street, which had been built in 1986 (originally being called Bridge Street Plaza). The building was renamed Civic Offices and opened as the council's headquarters in 2014, with the old council offices at the civic centre being demolished shortly afterwards.

A refurbishment of the Civic Offices included the construction of a new reception area, which was opened in January 2026, after which the building became known as the Civic Centre. The Cartwheeling Boys sculpture, presented to Reading in 1981 by one of its twin towns, Düsseldorf, Germany, was unveiled on an exterior wall of the Civic Centre in February 2026. The artwork had previously been on a site opposite the previous council offices, but the brick wall to which it was attached collapsed in February 2022 during Storm Eunice.

The refurbishment project also included the provision of new premises for Reading Central Library, which opened at the Civic Centre on 18 June 2026. Between July 1985 and May 2026, the library was housed in a purpose-built facility on King's Road, and before that on the corner of Valpy and Blagrave Streets. The new library occupies an area that is approximately twice the size of the King's Road site.
