= 2021 Reading Borough Council election =

2021 UK local government election

- 6 May 2021

17 out of 46 seats to Reading Borough Council 24 seats needed for a majority
- Turnout: 36.0% ▲2.4pp

	First party	Second party	Third party
Leader	Jason Brock	Rob White	Jeanette Skeats
Party	Labour	Green	Conservative
Last election	30 seats, 39.4%	4 seats, 8.7%	10 seats, 21.7%
Seats before	30	4	10
Seats won	10	2	4
Seats after	29	5	10
Seat change	▼1	▲1	Steady
	Fourth party
Party	Liberal Democrats
Last election	2 seats, 14.7%
Seats before	2
Seats won	1
Seats after	2
Seat change	Steady
- Winner of each seat at the 2021 Reading Borough Council election
Leader before election
Jason Brock
Labour
Leader after election
Jason Brock
Labour

The 2021 Reading Council election took place in 2021 to elect members of Reading Borough Council. This was on the same day as other local elections. The election was originally due to take place in May 2020, but was postponed due to the COVID-19 pandemic.

Council elections for the Reading Borough Council were last held on 2 May 2019 as part of the 2019 United Kingdom local elections. The council underwent a major boundary revision to apply from the 2022 elections.

All locally registered electors (British, Irish, Commonwealth and European Union citizens) who were aged 18 or over on polling day were entitled to vote in the local elections.

== Results summary ==
2021 Reading Borough Council election
Party	This election			Full council			This election		
Party	Seats	Net	Seats %	Other	Total	Total %	Votes	Votes %	+/−
Labour	10	▼1	58.8	19	29	63.0	18,625	41.1	+1.7
Conservative	4	Steady	23.5	6	10	21.7	14,281	31.5	+5.7
Green	2	▲1	11.8	3	5	10.9	7,395	16.3	-2.8
Liberal Democrats	1	Steady	5.9	1	2	4.3	4,644	10.2	-4.5
Independent	0	Steady	0.0	0	0	0.0	248	0.5	+0.1
Reform	0	Steady	0.0	0	0	0.0	81	0.2	New
TUSC	0	Steady	0.0	0	0	0.0	50	0.1	New
Liberal	0	Steady	0.0	0	0	0.0	23	0.1	±0.0
SDP	0	Steady	0.0	0	0	0.0	17	<0.1	New

== Ward results ==
=== Abbey ===
Abbey
Party	Candidate	Votes	%	±%
Labour	Tony Page	1,444	51.5	+2.8
Conservative	David Cozens	689	24.6	+7.0
Green	Howard Darby	432	15.4	−3.6
Liberal Democrats	Anne Thompson	238	8.5	−4.8
Majority		755		
Turnout		2,832	27.73	
Labour hold		Swing		

=== Battle ===
Battle
Party	Candidate	Votes	%	±%
Labour	Gul Khan	1,168	52.7	−2.3
Conservative	Michael Hey	472	21.3	+4.9
Green	Sarah Watchman	308	13.9	−3.2
Liberal Democrats	John Grout	170	7.7	−3.6
Independent	Yemi Awolola	99	4.5	N/A
Majority		696		
Turnout		2,246	27.66	
Labour hold		Swing		

=== Caversham ===
Caversham
Party	Candidate	Votes	%	±%
Labour	Richard Davies	1,480	47.6	+3.5
Conservative	Ian Binge	906	29.1	+5.5
Green	Sally Newman	407	13.1	−3.9
Liberal Democrats	Christopher Ward	174	5.6	−9.8
Independent	Sara Fulbrook	128	4.1	N/A
SDP	Damian Skelton	17	0.5	N/A
Majority		574		
Turnout		3,136	42.32	
Labour hold		Swing		

=== Church ===
Church
Party	Candidate	Votes	%	±%
Labour	Ashley Pearce	995	46.5	−0.7
Conservative	Adam Phelps	820	38.3	+14.6
Green	Kathryn McCann	220	10.3	−4.7
Liberal Democrats	Mark Cole	106	5.0	−7.7
Majority		175		
Turnout		2,152	31.22	
Labour hold		Swing		

=== Katesgrove ===
Katesgrove
Party	Candidate	Votes	%	±%
Labour	Rose Williams	938	41.2	−15.2
Green	Louise Keane	868	38.1	+21.2
Conservative	Abdoulaye Sow	344	15.1	+0.5
Liberal Democrats	Margaret McNeill	93	4.1	−6.5
Independent	Jean-Louis Pascual	36	1.6	N/A
Majority		70		
Turnout		2,305	31.14	
Labour hold		Swing		

=== Kentwood ===
Kentwood
Party	Candidate	Votes	%	±%
Labour	Daya Pal Singh	1,173	43.3	+5.3
Conservative	Nick Fudge	1,135	41.9	+0.3
Green	Anthea West	204	7.5	−2.0
Liberal Democrats	Gary Coster	198	7.3	−2.4
Majority		38		
Turnout		2,731	37.10	
Labour hold		Swing		

=== Mapledurham ===
Mapledurham
Party	Candidate	Votes	%	±%
Conservative	Isobel Ballsdon	724	51.5	−2.1
Liberal Democrats	Chris Burden	330	23.5	−0.3
Labour	Bouba Dembele	208	14.8	+0.2
Green	Brent Smith	143	10.2	+2.3
Majority		394		
Turnout		1,415	56.15	
Conservative hold		Swing		

=== Minster ===
Minster
Party	Candidate	Votes	%	±%
Labour	Liz Terry	1,256	44.8	−0.1
Conservative	Alanzo Seville	904	32.2	+0.6
Green	Isobel Hoskins	352	12.6	+2.5
Liberal Democrats	Ben Sims	292	10.4	−1.8
Majority		352		
Turnout		2,833	36.48	
Labour hold		Swing		

=== Norcot ===
Norcot
Party	Candidate	Votes	%	±%
Labour	Jo Lovelock	1,301	55.8	+1.5
Conservative	Zachary Okeyo	683	29.3	+7.2
Green	Richard Walkem	191	8.2	−2.6
Liberal Democrats	James Moore	114	4.9	−2.7
Liberal	Stephen Graham	23	1.0	−1.1
TUSC	Neil Adams	21	0.9	N/A
Majority		618		
Turnout		2,344	30.15	
Labour hold		Swing		

=== Park ===
Park
Party	Candidate	Votes	%	±%
Green	Brenda McGonigle	1,631	50.6	−3.9
Labour	Amjad Tarar	1,253	38.8	+1.8
Conservative	Abi Jones	263	8.2	+5.8
Liberal Democrats	Chris Dodson	79	2.4	−0.1
Majority		378		
Turnout		3,245	44.45	
Green hold		Swing		

=== Peppard ===
Peppard
Party	Candidate	Votes	%	±%
Conservative	Jane Stanford-Beale	1,498	43.7	−4.7
Conservative	Clarence Mitchell	1,457	42.5	−5.9
Labour	James Denny	1,005	29.3	+7.5
Labour	Benjamin Perry	765	22.3	+0.5
Green	Doug Cresswell	528	15.4	+0.6
Liberal Democrats	Hilary Smart	378	11.0	−2.6
Liberal Democrats	Pieter de Boiserie	359	10.5	−3.1
Green	Sarah McNamara	248	7.2	−7.6
Reform	Vincent Ruane	81	2.4	N/A
Majority				
Turnout		3,432	45.68	
Conservative hold		Swing		
Conservative hold		Swing		

=== Redlands ===
Redlands
Party	Candidate	Votes	%	±%
Green	David McElroy	1,009	41.8	−4.5
Labour	Andrew Hornsby-Smith	999	41.4	+5.3
Conservative	Shekhar Natarajan	319	13.2	+2.6
Liberal Democrats	Francis Jakeman	84	3.5	−2.5
Majority		10		
Turnout		2,433	36.61	
Green gain from Labour		Swing		

=== Southcote ===
Southcote
Party	Candidate	Votes	%	±%
Labour	Debs Edwards	1,303	55.0	+2.8
Conservative	Gabriella Kirkby	814	34.4	+8.6
Green	Asad Feroz	166	7.0	−4.3
Liberal Democrats	Riccardo Mancuso-Marcello	85	3.6	−5.6
Majority		489		
Turnout		2,394	35.13	
Labour hold		Swing		

=== Thames ===
Thames
Party	Candidate	Votes	%	±%
Conservative	Paul Carnell	1,561	40.9	+7.1
Labour	Caroline McArthur	1,221	32.0	+7.9
Liberal Democrats	Joanna Ramsay	619	16.2	−5.8
Green	Danny McNamara	419	11.0	−9.1
Majority		340		
Turnout		3,857	51.59	
Conservative hold		Swing		

=== Tilehurst ===
Tilehurst
Party	Candidate	Votes	%	±%
Liberal Democrats	Meri O'Connell	1,218	44.8	−2.2
Conservative	Jay Varley	944	34.8	+7.1
Labour	Indy Singh	412	15.2	+1.6
Green	Gabriel Berry-Khan	113	4.2	−0.3
TUSC	Jen Bottom	29	1.1	N/A
Majority		274		
Turnout		2,735	37.01	
Liberal Democrats hold		Swing		

=== Whitley ===
Whitley
Party	Candidate	Votes	%	±%
Labour	Alice Mpofu-Coles	1,326	54.8	−4.2
Conservative	Elizabeth Sheppard	748	30.9	+12.0
Green	Kathy Smith	156	6.4	−5.3
Liberal Democrats	Ian Westby	107	4.4	−4.3
Independent	Bala Sani	84	3.5	N/A
Majority		578		
Turnout		2,439	25.20	
Labour hold		Swing		
