= Caversham Heights (Reading ward) =

Electoral ward of Reading, Berkshire, England

Coordinates: 51.477°N 0.988°W

Caversham Heights Ward, Borough of Reading
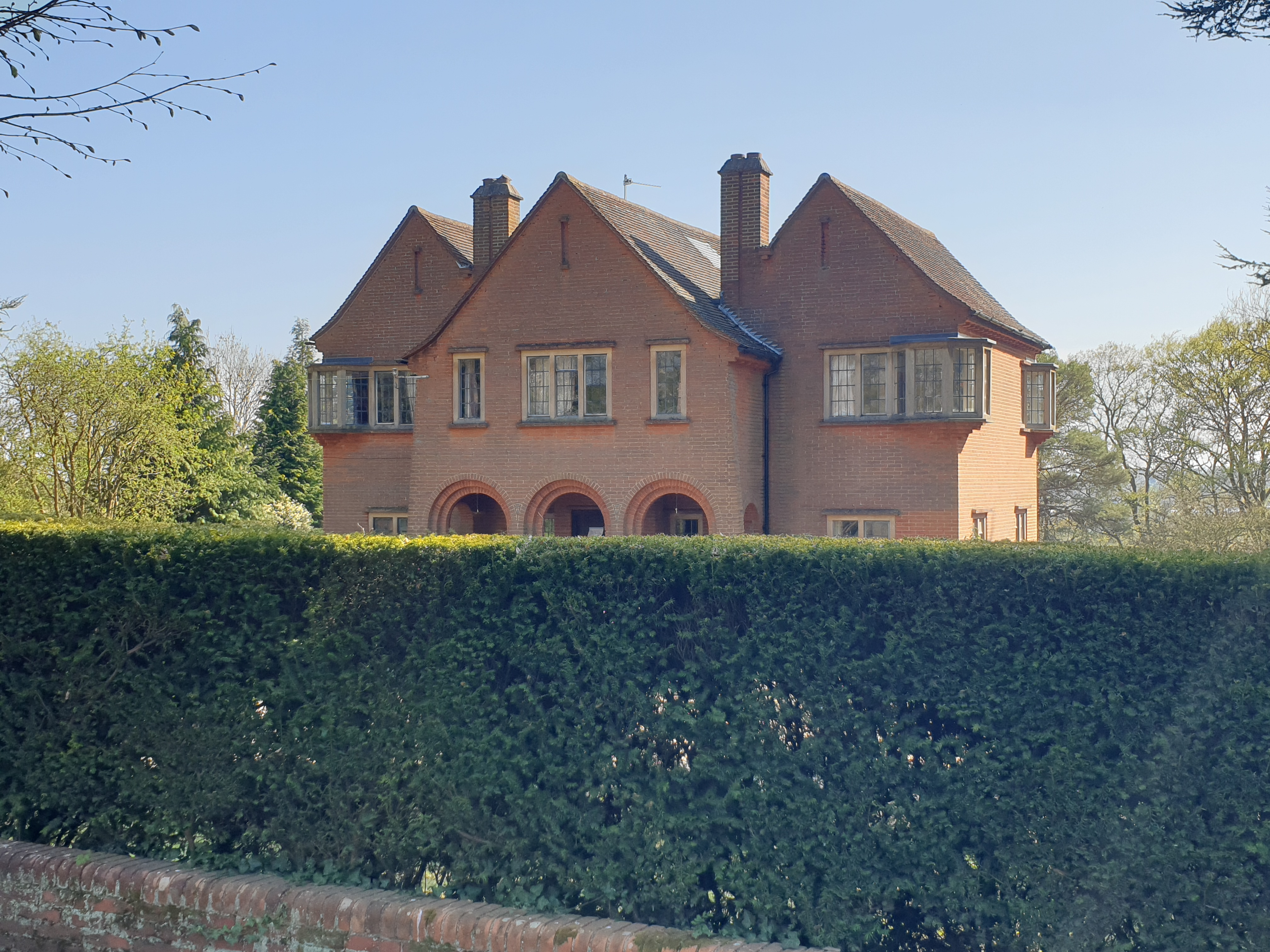
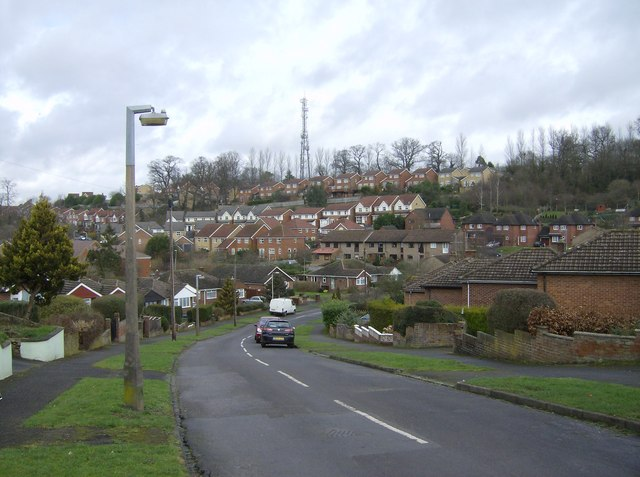
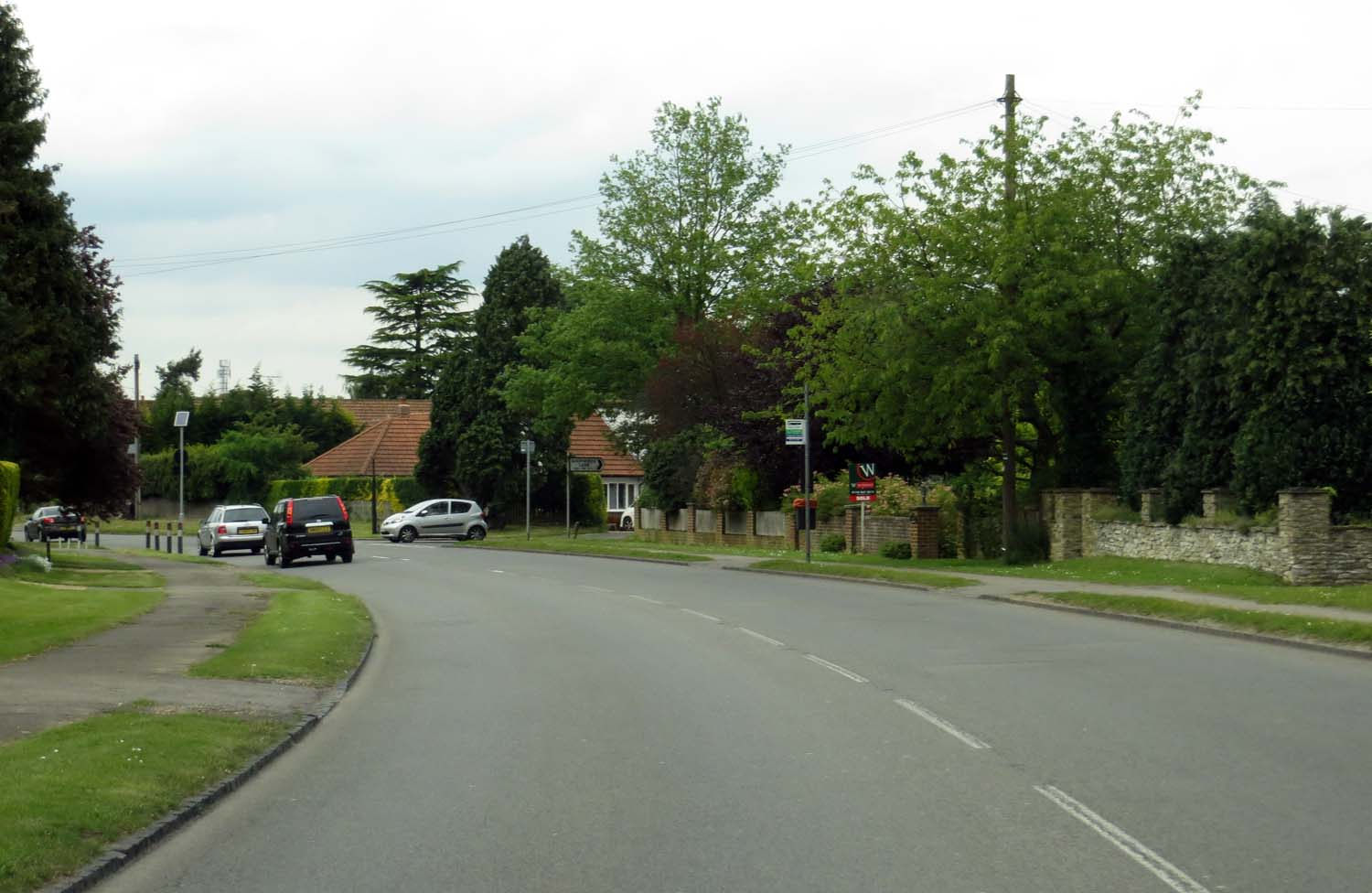
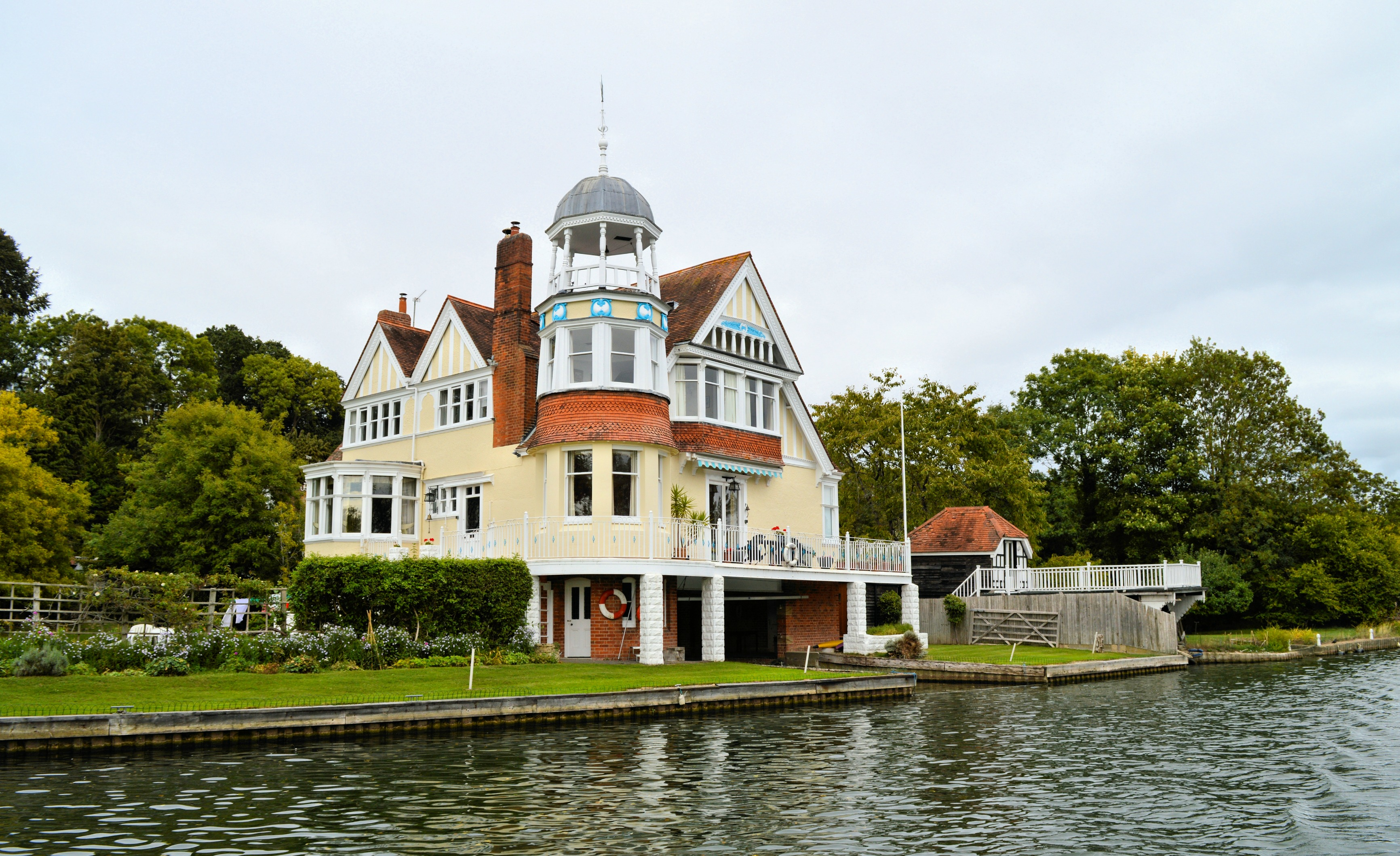
- Clockwise from top left: Four Corners on Upper Warren Avenue, Hemdean Bottom, Riverside house on the Warren, Woodcote Road

- Location within Berkshire
- Area: 3.388 km^{2} (1.308 sq mi)
- Population: 9,424
  - Density: 2,782/km^{2} (7,210/sq mi)
- OS grid reference: SU703759
- Unitary authority: Reading
- Ceremonial county: Berkshire
- Region: South East
- Country: England
- Sovereign state: United Kingdom
- Police: Thames Valley
- Fire: Royal Berkshire
- Ambulance: South Central
- UK Parliament: Reading Central

Caversham Heights is an electoral ward of the Borough of Reading, in the English county of Berkshire. The ward was created by a boundary reorganisation prior to the 2022 Reading Borough Council election, and has replaced the former Mapledurham ward, with the addition of parts of the old Thames and Peppard wards. During the reorganisation process, the ward was known as The Heights, but the name was subsequent changed as a result of public consultation.

== Location ==
The ward lies in Caversham, once a separate town to the north of the River Thames, and includes the area known as Caversham Heights, together with other parts of the larger area of Caversham to the west and north of the town centre.

From the south in clockwise order it is bounded by the River Thames, the borough boundary to the west and north, Highdown Hill Road, St Barnabas Road, Evesham Road, Rotherfield Way, Oakley Road, Kidmore Road, The Mount, and The Warren back to the River Thames.

The ward is bordered, in the same order, by Mapledurham and Kidmore End civil parishes of Oxfordshire, followed by Emmer Green, Caversham, new Thames, Battle, and Kentwood wards. It is entirely within the Reading Central parliamentary constituency.

== Profile ==
=== Demographics ===
As of 2024, Caversham Heights ward had an area of 3.388 square kilometres (1.308 sq mi) and there were 9,424 people living there. Of these, 19.2% were under 15 and 20.6% were 65 and over; 85.9% classified themselves as White, 7.8% as Asian, and 1.6% as Black, Caribbean or African; 18.6% were born outside the UK.

The population lived in 3,623 households, of which 9.2% were in a flat, maisonette or apartment, and 90.8% were in a house or bungalow. Of the households, 44.3% were owned outright by the residents, 41.7% were owned subject to a mortgage, loan or shared ownership, 9.2% were privately rented and 4.8% were socially rented.

Of the population aged over 16, 60.8% were in employment, 2.3% were unemployed, and 37.0% were economically inactive. Of those in employment, 71.7% were in managerial, professional or technical occupations. A total of 55.8% of the population were educated to university degree level.

=== Environment ===
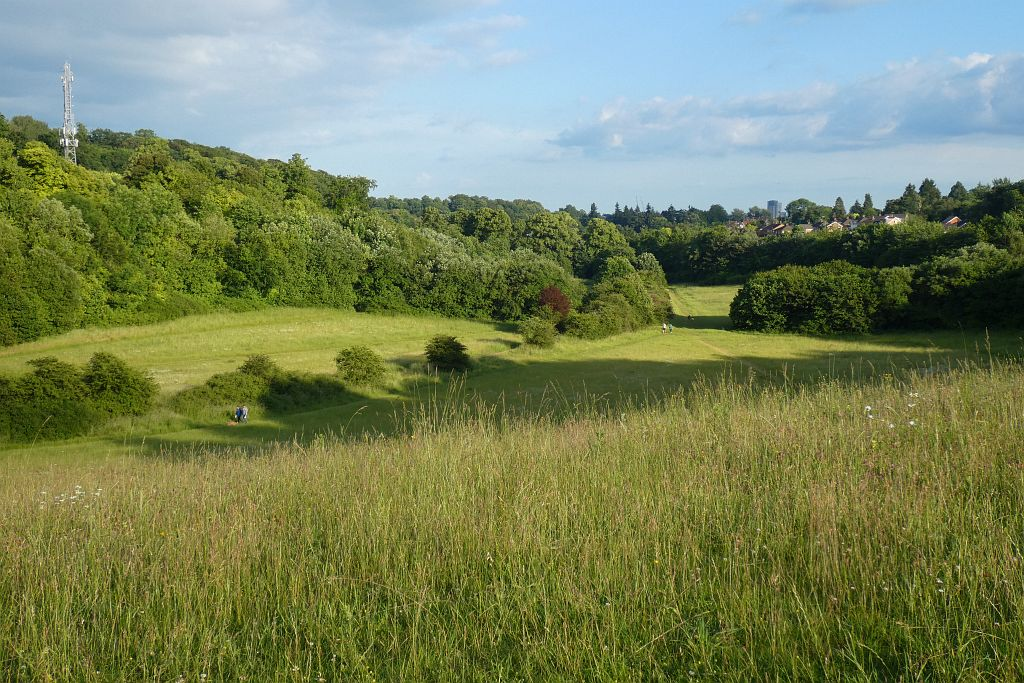
Bug's Bottom

As of 2022, Caversham Heights ward had a tree canopy cover of 26.9%, compared to figures of 17.7% for the Reading as a whole, and 16.5% for the United Kingdom. Significant open space includes Bug's Bottom and Mapledurham Playing Fields.

=== Facilities ===
The ward includes Highdown secondary school and The Heights primary school.

== Representation ==
As with all Reading wards, the ward elects three councillors to Reading Borough Council. Elections since 2004 are generally held by thirds, with elections in three years out of four. As of May 2026 the ward councillors are Isobel Ballsdon and Saadia Saadat, both of whom are members of the Conservative party, and Jenny McGrother, who is a member of the Labour party.
