= Reading Central =

UK Parliament constituency (since 2024)

Coordinates: 51.46°N 0.97°W

- Borough constituency for the House of Commons
- Boundaries since 2024
- Boundary of Reading Central in South East England
- County: Berkshire
- Electorate: 71,283 (2023)

Current constituency
- Created: 2024
- Member of Parliament: Matt Rodda (Labour)
- Seats: One
- Created from: Reading West; Reading East

Reading Central is a constituency (Note: A borough constituency (for the purposes of election expenses and type of returning officer)) in the House of Commons of the UK Parliament. Created as a result of the 2023 Periodic Review of Westminster constituencies, it was first contested at the 2024 general election. Since 2024, it has been represented by Labour's Matt Rodda, who was MP for Reading East from 2017 to 2024.

The seat subsumes parts of the former Reading West and Reading East constituencies but, unlike them, the whole of the new constituency is within the Borough of Reading.

== Constituency profile ==
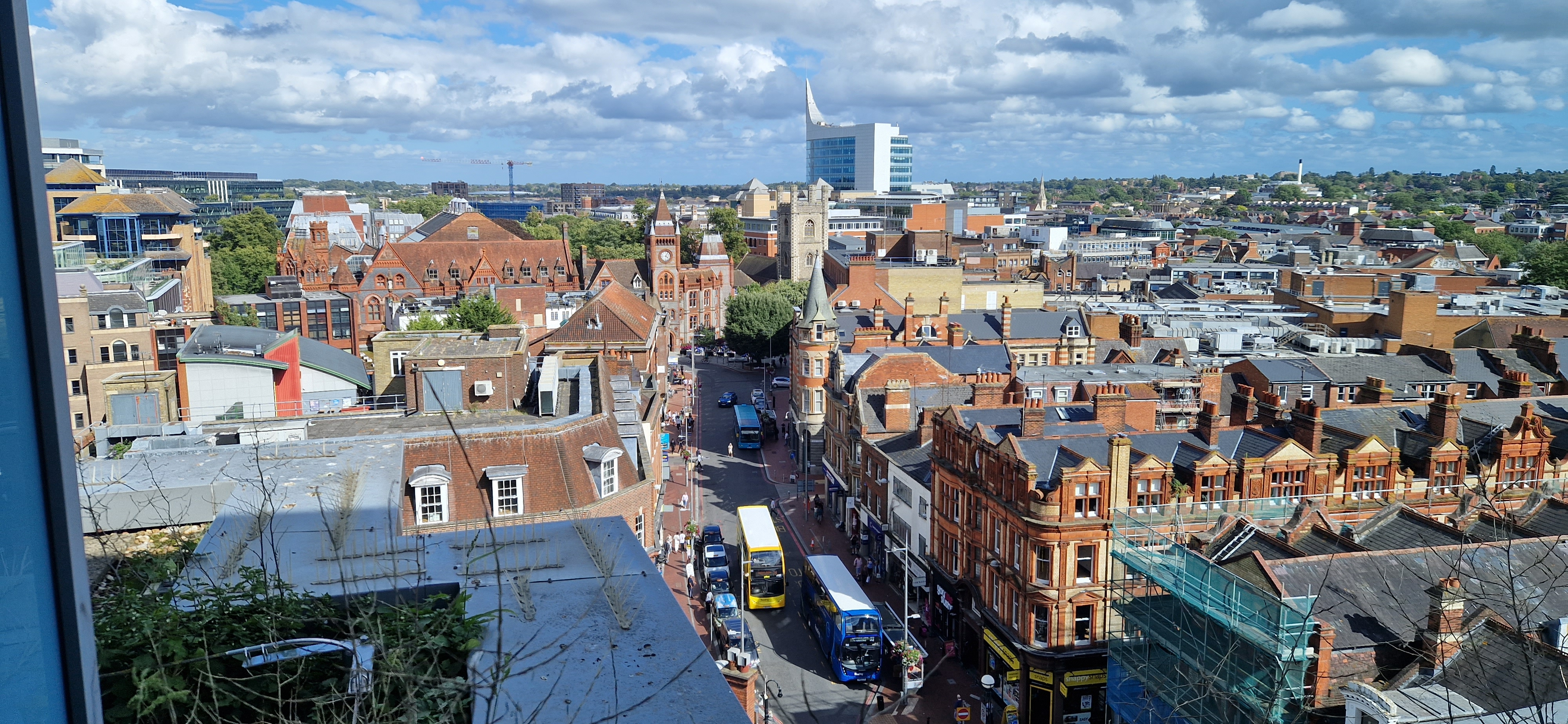
Friar Street, Reading, with The Blade visible in the distance

Reading Central is a constituency in Berkshire in South East England. It covers the centre and north of the town of Reading, including the areas of Southcote, Katesgrove, Newtown and Caversham.

Reading is one of the UK's largest towns without city status. It is sometimes considered part of the London commuter belt; the capital is located around 37 miles (60 km) to the east. Reading is a historic town and was traditionally a centre for brewing and manufacturing. Today the economy is geared towards the technology and insurance industries. The town's central neighbourhoods have average levels of wealth whilst the suburbs north of the River Thames are highly-affluent, with most of this area falling within the top 10% least-deprived parts of England. Most residents in the town centre live in dense terraces or flats whilst Caversham in the north mostly consists of large detached and semi-detached housing. House prices across the constituency are generally higher than the UK average.

Reading Central has a large population of young and middle-aged adults and a low proportion of retirees. The University of Reading is located just outside this constituency, but many of its students reside in the adjacent neighbourhoods which lie within Reading Central. Residents generally have high levels of income but low rates of homeownership. The child poverty rate is below-average. Most residents are well-educated and a high proportion work in the science and technology sectors. The percentage claiming unemployment benefits is in line with the overall UK rate. White people made up 66% of the population at the 2021 census, around a quarter of whom were of non-British origin including large Polish and Romanian communities. Asians, mostly of Indian or Pakistani origin, were 19% of the population and Black people were 7%.

Most of the constituency is represented by the Labour Party at the local borough council, with some Green Party councillors elected in the town centre and Conservatives elected in the wealthier north. Voters in Reading Central strongly supported remaining in the European Union in the 2016 referendum; an estimated 64% voted to remain compared to the UK-wide rate of 48%.

== History ==
At the time of the 2023 Periodic Review of Westminster constituencies, there were eight constituencies in the county of Berkshire. Of these constituencies, only three (Reading East, Reading West, and Windsor) were within the permitted electorate range of no fewer than 69,724 electors and no more than 77,062. All of the remaining constituencies were above the upper limit. The Boundary Commission for England therefore proposed the addition of a ninth constituency within the county.

Whilst both Reading constituencies could have remained unchanged, the boundary commission instead proposed a reconfiguration to account for the increased electorates of the surrounding constituencies, and to better reflect local ties in the surrounding communities. This involved the creation of two new constituencies, Earley and Woodley and Mid Berkshire (renamed Reading West and Mid Berkshire in the final proposals), both with the bulk of their electorate outside the Borough of Reading but including outer wards of the borough, together with a new Reading constituency entirely within the borough.

During the process of acceptance of these proposals, the name was changed from Reading to Reading Central.

== Boundaries ==
=== Local government ===
The constituency is defined as being composed of the following wards of the Borough of Reading as they existed on 1 December 2020:

- Abbey, Battle, Caversham, Katesgrove, Mapledurham, Minster, Park, Peppard, Redlands, Southcote, and Thames. (Note: For the purposes of this definition, the Boundary Commission have used the borough ward names and definitions as existed prior to 2022 rather than the current names and definitions.)

The Battle, Minster and Southcote wards were previously in Reading West, with the remainder, comprising 73% of the new seat, in Reading East.

As a result of a local government boundary review which came into effect in May 2022, the constituency now comprises the following current Borough of Reading wards:

- Abbey, Battle (most), Caversham, Caversham Heights, Coley, Emmer Green, Katesgrove, Norcot (small part), Park, Redlands (most), Southcote, and Thames.

=== Parliamentary ===
The constituency is bordered by the seats of Reading West and Mid Berkshire, Henley and Thame, and Earley and Woodley.

== Members of Parliament ==
Reading East and Reading West prior to 2024

Election	Member	Party
2024	Matt Rodda	Labour

== Elections ==
=== Elections in the 2020s ===
General election 2024: Reading Central
Party	Candidate	Votes	%	±%
Labour	Matt Rodda	21,598	47.7	−4.9
Conservative	Raj Singh	8,961	19.8	−16.6
Green	Dave McElroy	6,417	14.2	+11.1
Liberal Democrats	Henry Wright	3,963	8.8	+2.4
Reform	Andy Williams	3,904	8.6	+7.5
Independent	Michael Jeffrey Turberville	227	0.5	N/A
TUSC	Adam Gillman	221	0.5	N/A
Majority		12,637	27.9	+11.7
Turnout		45,291	61.5	–10.8
Registered electors		73,600		
Labour hold		Swing	▲5.9	

2019 notional result
Party	Vote	%
Labour	27,107	52.6
Conservative	18,756	36.4
Liberal Democrats	3,288	6.4
Green	1,603	3.1
Brexit Party	574	1.1
Others	202	0.4
Turnout	51,530	72.3
Electorate	71,283	

== See also ==
- List of parliamentary constituencies in Berkshire
- List of parliamentary constituencies in the South East England (region)
