= Caversham Heights =

Suburb in Berkshire, England

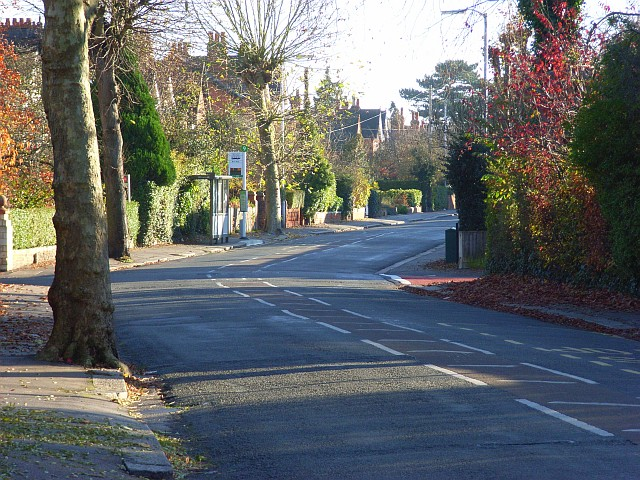
- Albert Road
- OS grid reference: SU7075
- Unitary authority: Reading
- Ceremonial county: Berkshire
- Region: South East
- Country: England
- Sovereign state: United Kingdom
- Post town: READING
- Postcode district: RG4
- Dialling code: 0118
- Police: Thames Valley
- Fire: Royal Berkshire
- Ambulance: South Central
- UK Parliament: Reading East
- Website: https://www.geograph.org.uk/photo/616930

Caversham Heights is a residential area within Caversham in the borough of Reading in Berkshire, England, located to the west of the centre of Caversham. Until 1911, Caversham was part of Oxfordshire, and it remains a part of the historic county. The name Caversham Heights traditionally refers to that part of Caversham situated on higher ground to the west of central Caversham, straddling the Woodcote Road (A4074). Since 2022, Caversham Heights has also been the name of a local government ward that extends to the Thames in the south, and across Hemdean Bottom to St. Barnabas Road in the east.

House prices in Caversham Heights are among the highest in Reading and Caversham Heights itself is one of the most expensive places to live in Reading. According to 2020 ONS data, Caversham Heights is Reading's most affluent neighbourhood.

== Geomorphology and archaeology ==
Its altitude is around 60 metres above sea level, the land falling away to the east into the dry glacial overflow channel of Hemdean or Bug's Bottom. Its soil is composed of a Hill Gravel cap on top of Cretaceous Upper Chalk. Around 1900, some 600-700 Paleolithic hand-axes made of flint were dug up in a gravel pit at Toot's Farm on Darell Road, which has since been built over. This farm also possessed a notable mediaeval timber-framed barn, but this was demolished. Older houses betray this geology through their brick and flint construction.

== History ==
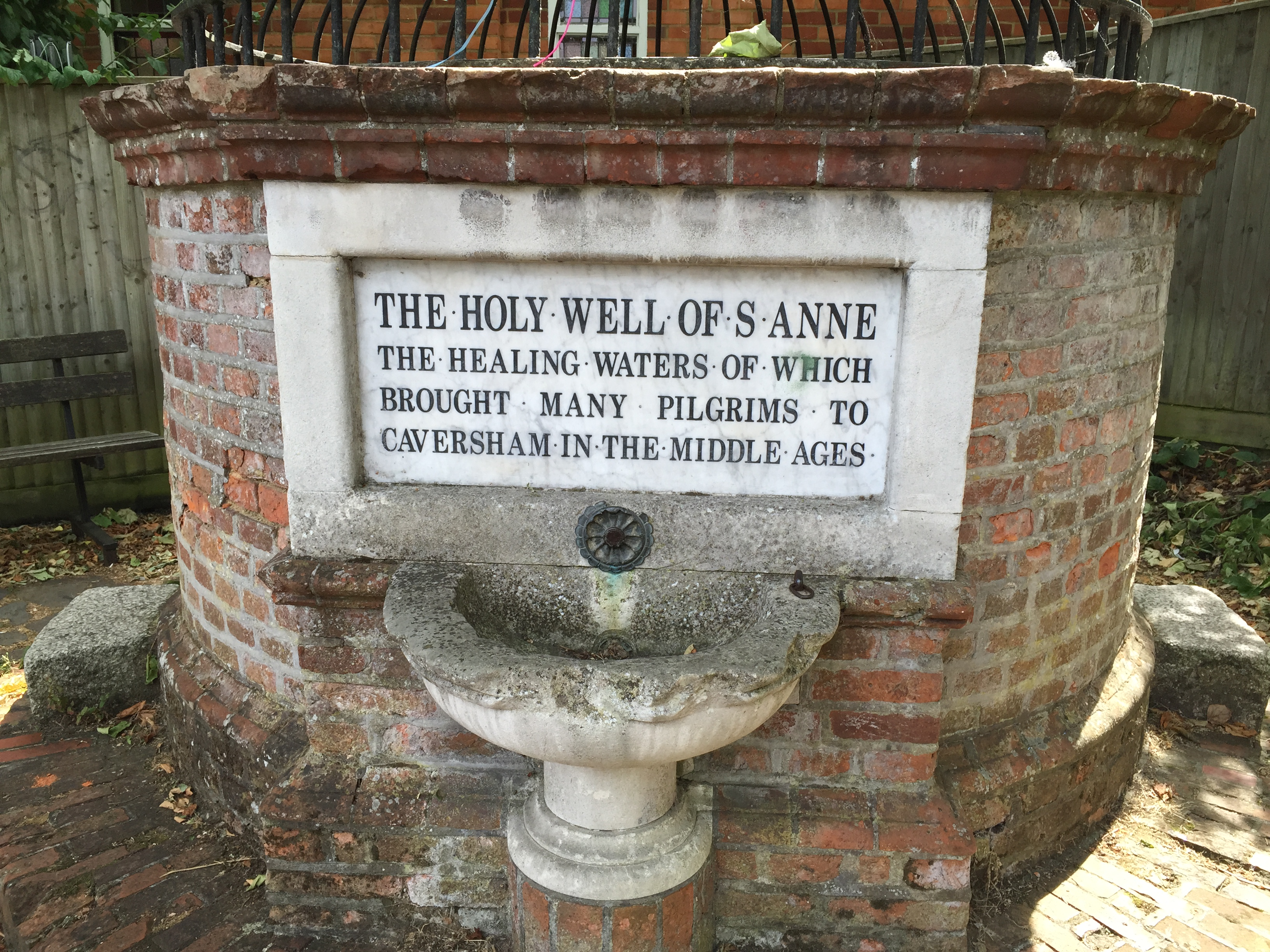
St Anne's Well

Although finds on Chazey Road and Conisboro Avenue hint at human habitation dating back to pre-history, Caversham Heights expanded slowly and only really experienced significant growth beginning in the Victorian era, as such most of the homes are late 19th and 20th-century. The main arteries are Woodcote Road to the West and Kidmore Road to the East. Between these, in the 1930s an apple orchard was felled and built upon to become the Woodcote Way, Geoffreyson Road and Shepherds Lane area and in the 1960s a nearby gravel quarry was redeveloped to become what is now Silverthorne Drive, Queensborough Drive and Carlton Road.

Caversham Heights is home to St. Anne's Well on Priest hill, once a popular destination for pilgrims and sicklings since Anglo-Saxon times. First mentioned in the Cartulary of Nutley Abbey in 1106, it was lost during the Dissolution of the Monasteries or shortly thereafter until being rediscovered by workmen in 1906.

== Demography ==
Caversham Heights makes up about one-third of Caversham as a whole, and comprises most of the RG4 7 postcode sector. Until the reorganisation of 2022, it fell mostly within the Mapledurham ward of Reading Borough, with the eastern edge being within the old Thames ward. Mapledurham ward had an area of 1.49 square kilometres and had a very low population density - at 2,020 people per square kilometre, only 2% of that of Reading overall. In 2018, 3,010 people lived in the ward, with 18.3% of these being children aged 0–15 and 25.4% older than 65, and 11.3% being non-white. They lived in 1,244 dwellings, of which 66% were detached. It was the least deprived ward in Reading, with only 2.3% of children being at risk of living in poverty and 2.9% of the working age population claiming benefits. 66.4% of people between 16 and 74 years were in employment, of whom 67% were in managerial/professional/technical occupations and 33% in professional occupations.

== Amenities ==
The area is served by Reading Transport circular bus service 22 to Reading Station, and by the X39 and X40 from Reading to Oxford and the 146 to Cray's Pond.

Educational provision is limited to a nursery school, Caversham Heights Pre-School, with primary school pupils going to Caversham Primary School, which is rated ‘outstanding’, in Hemdean Road to the East.

St Andrew's Church of England church, built in 1910, is on Albert Road. Caversham Heights Methodist Church stands on Highmoor Road. It hosts the meetings of the Caversham Heights Society which holds lectures on historical and cultural topics and makes visits to sites of interest.

There are two recreation grounds in Caversham Heights:

- The Albert Road Recreation Ground provides public tennis courts and is home to a bowling club and a croquet club;
- Mapledurham Playing Fields also offers tennis courts as well as several football pitches and a combined outdoor basketball/5 a-side football court.

Two golf courses and a health club with swimming pool lie just outside Caversham Heights in neighbouring South Oxfordshire. Caversham Lawn Tennis Club, formed in the early 1900s, can be found on Queensborough Drive.

Caversham Heights only has one public house, for many decades named the Grosvenor but, after refurbishment in 2017, was renamed the Caversham Rose and is now a Miller & Carter steakhouse, on Kidmore Road. Two roadside pubs on the A4074 also serve the area: the Pack Saddle, in Mapledurham 250 metres north of the Royal County of Berkshire boundary, and the Pack Horse in Chazey Heath, 1.5 kilometres further northwest.

The area has two convenience stores, Conisboro Stores, which is also a post office, and Woodcote Way News.

Its telephone numbers followed the format "0734 47####" until 1995, then "01734 47####" until 1998, and since then "0118 947 ####".

== Governance ==
As a unitary authority, the borough of Reading is responsible for all aspects of local government within the area. From 2022, a new Caversham Heights ward was created within the borough, with its boundaries extending beyond the area that traditionally carries the name.

The area is within the Reading East parliamentary constituency, which in recent years has alternately chosen Conservative and Labour MPs. As of 2020 it is represented by Matt Rodda (Labour) with a 10.6% majority. Prior to 1 February 2020 it was in the South East England European constituency.

== Fiction ==
A fictionalised Caversham Heights is the central theme of the book The Well of Lost Plots by Jasper Fforde.

== Notable residents ==
Rudolph Walker - EastEnders character Patrick Trueman.

Tracy Shaw - Coronation Street character Maxine Peacock.

In the first half of the 20th century, the Aga Khan owned a residence on Richmond Road, as well as stables nearby in Oxfordshire.

Alma Cogan, the "Girl with the Giggle in Her Voice", lived on Geoffreyson Road whilst attending St Joseph's Convent School in Reading.
