= 2022 Reading Borough Council election =

2022 UK local government election

- 5 May 2022

All 48 seats to Reading Borough Council 25 seats needed for a majority
- Turnout: 34.6% ▼1.4pp

	First party	Second party
Party	Labour	Green
Last election	29 seats, 41.1%	5 seats, 16.3%
Seats won	32	7
Seat change	▲3	▲2
Popular vote	52,405	18,663
Percentage	47.3%	16.8%
Swing	▲6.2%	▲0.5%
	Third party	Fourth party
Party	Conservative	Liberal Democrats
Last election	10 seats, 31.5%	2 seats, 10.2%
Seats won	6	3
Seat change	▼4	▲1
Popular vote	29,153	10,178
Percentage	26.3%	9.2%
Swing	▼5.2%	▼1.0%
- Winner of each seat at the 2022 Reading Borough Council election
Council control before election
Labour
Council control after election
Labour

An election to Reading Borough Council took place as of 5 May 2022. Following boundary changes all the seats on the council were up for election.

== Previous council composition ==
After 2021 election		Before 2022 election	
Party	Seats	Party	Seats
Labour	29	Labour	29
Conservative	10	Conservative	9
Green	5	Green	5
Liberal Democrats	2	Liberal Democrats	2
Independent	0	Independent	1

Changes:

- January 2022: Chris Maskell leaves Labour to sit as an independent, David Stevens leaves Conservatives for Labour

== Results ==
2022 Reading Borough Council election
Party	This election				Full council			This election		
Party	Candidates	Seats	Net	Seats %	Other	Total	Total %	Votes	Votes %	+/−
Labour	{{{candidates}}}	32	▲3	66.7	0	32	66.7	52,405	47.3	
Green	{{{candidates}}}	7	▲2	14.6	0	7	14.6	18,663	16.8	
Conservative	{{{candidates}}}	6	▼4	12.5	0	6	12.5	29,153	26.3	
Liberal Democrats	{{{candidates}}}	3	▲1	6.3	0	3	6.25	10,178	9.2	
TUSC	{{{candidates}}}	0	Steady	0.0	0	0	0.0	199	0.2	
Independent	{{{candidates}}}	0	Steady	0.0	0	0	0.0	180	0.2	

== Ward results ==
The Notice of Poll and Statement of Persons Nominated was published on 6 April 2022. The results were published on 6 May.

=== Abbey ===
Abbey
Party	Candidate	Votes	%
Labour	Karen Rowland	936	61.0
Labour	Tony Page	876	57.1
Labour	Mohammed Ayub	861	56.1
Green	Howard Darby	450	29.3
Conservative	Jim Brennan	314	20.5
Liberal Democrats	Christopher Ward	291	19.0
Conservative	Stephen Goss	288	18.8
Conservative	Simon Bazley	269	17.5
Turnout			24.0
Labour hold			
Labour hold			
Labour hold			

=== Battle ===
Battle
Party	Candidate	Votes	%
Labour	Sarah Hacker	1,410	70.5
Labour	Wendy Griffith	1,330	66.5
Labour	Gul Khan	1,180	59.0
Green	Callum Harling	422	21.1
Conservative	Michael Hey	308	15.4
Conservative	Lizzy Sheppard	288	14.4
Conservative	John Murray	287	14.3
Liberal Democrats	John Grout	267	13.3
Turnout			27.0
Labour hold			
Labour hold			
Labour hold			

=== Caversham ===
Caversham
Party	Candidate	Votes	%
Labour	Jacopo Lanzoni	1,915	58.5
Labour	Matt Yeo	1,793	54.8
Labour	Jan Gavin	1,622	49.5
Conservative	Andrew Ballsdon	895	27.3
Green	Sally Newman	873	26.7
Conservative	Ian Binge	771	23.5
Conservative	Saadia Saadat	704	21.5
Liberal Democrats	Juliet England	545	16.6
Turnout			43.0
Labour hold			
Labour hold			
Labour hold			

=== Caversham Heights ===
Caversham Heights
Party	Candidate	Votes	%
Conservative	Isobel Ballsdon	1,629	43.3
Labour	Sue Kitchingham	1,343	35.9
Conservative	Paul Carnell	1,340	35.6
Conservative	Dave Luckett	1,283	34.1
Labour	Matt Buckley	1,141	30.3
Labour	Vikram Duhan	974	25.9
Liberal Democrats	Joanna Ramsay	937	24.9
Green	Danny McNamara	901	24.0
Liberal Democrats	Christopher Burden	741	19.7
Liberal Democrats	Thomas Weir	421	11.2
Turnout			50.0
Conservative hold			
Labour gain from Conservative			
Conservative hold			

=== Church ===
Church
Party	Candidate	Votes	%
Labour	Ruth McEwan	1,337	59.8
Labour	Andrew Hornsby-Smith	1,277	57.1
Labour	Paul Woodward	1,156	51.7
Conservative	James Mugo	842	37.7
Conservative	Adam Phelps	755	33.8
Conservative	Alanzo Seville	663	29.7
Green	Mike Harling	381	17.0
Liberal Democrats	Peter Boardley	296	13.2
Turnout			29.0
Labour hold			
Labour hold			
Labour hold			

=== Coley ===
Coley
Party	Candidate	Votes	%
Labour	Ellie Emberson	1,529	69.1
Labour	Liz Terry	1,368	61.8
Labour	Paul Gittings	1,335	60.3
Green	Isobel Hoskins	529	23.9
Conservative	David McMahon	509	23.0
Conservative	Grace Taylor	508	23.0
Conservative	Mas Shepherd	457	20.7
Liberal Democrats	Benjamin Sims	403	18.2
Turnout			34.0
Labour hold			
Labour hold			
Labour hold			

=== Emmer Green ===
Emmer Green
Party	Candidate	Votes	%
Conservative	Clarence Mitchell	1,380	43.3
Conservative	Simon Robinson	1,372	43.0
Conservative	Harry Kretchmer	1,299	40.7
Labour	Robert Dimmick	1,235	38.7
Labour	Rachel Jones	1,123	35.2
Green	Mazin Abdalla	888	27.8
Labour	Len Middleton	858	26.9
Liberal Democrats	Pieter De Boiserie	698	21.9
Turnout			42.0
Conservative hold			
Conservative hold			
Conservative hold			

=== Katesgrove ===
Katesgrove
Party	Candidate	Votes	%
Green	Louise Keane	1,177	49.7
Labour	Liam Challenger	1,025	43.3
Green	Doug Cresswell	1,002	42.4
Green	Kate Nikulina	952	40.2
Labour	Mamuna Naz	801	33.9
Labour	George Mathew	789	33.3
Conservative	Edward Belderbos	260	11.0
Conservative	Daniel Hughes	243	10.3
Conservative	Mike Milner	238	10.1
Liberal Democrats	Margaret McNeill	182	7.7
Turnout			31.0
Green gain from Labour			
Labour hold			
Green gain from Labour			

=== Kentwood ===
Kentwood
Party	Candidate	Votes	%
Labour	Glenn Dennis	1,322	47.1
Labour	Mark Keeping	1,236	44.0
Conservative	Raj Singh	1,120	39.9
Conservative	Jenny Rynn	1,105	39.4
Labour	David Stevens	1,091	38.9
Conservative	Nick Fudge	1,017	36.2
Green	Caroline Hearst	357	12.7
Liberal Democrats	Jonathan Barker	316	11.3
Green	Brent Smith	268	9.5
Turnout			
Labour hold			
Labour gain from Conservative			
Conservative hold			

=== Norcot ===
Norcot
Party	Candidate	Votes	%
Labour	Jo Lovelock	1,390	61.4
Labour	Graeme Hoskin	1,319	58.3
Labour	Colette Dennis	1,286	56.8
Conservative	Luke Ellis	473	20.9
Conservative	Suzanne Rowe	439	19.4
Conservative	Zach Okeyo	422	18.7
Green	Richard Walkem	419	18.5
Liberal Democrats	Dorothy Gibert	271	12.0
Independent	Alan Gulliver	180	8.0
TUSC	Jen Bottom	114	5.0
Turnout			
Labour hold			
Labour hold			
Labour hold			

=== Park ===
Park
Party	Candidate	Votes	%
Green	Rob White	1,736	56.3
Green	Brenda McGonigle	1,607	52.1
Green	Josh Williams	1,504	48.8
Labour	Sheldon Allen	1,083	35.1
Labour	Andy Gilpin	982	31.9
Labour	Oliver Williamson	950	30.8
Conservative	Niki Haywood	224	7.3
Conservative	Nathan O'Brien	200	6.5
Conservative	Sagar Patel	195	6.3
Liberal Democrats	Chris Dodson	120	3.9
Turnout			
Green hold			
Green hold			
Green hold			

=== Redlands ===
Redlands
Party	Candidate	Votes	%
Green	Kathryn McCann	1,308	45.3
Green	David McElroy	1,246	43.2
Labour Co-op	Will Cross	1,193	41.3
Green	Jamie Whitham	1,156	40.0
Labour Co-op	Marg Cobb	1,148	39.8
Labour Co-op	Amjad Tarar	1,057	36.6
Conservative	Allison Carnell	282	9.8
Conservative	Simon Holden	243	8.4
Conservative	Shivraj Hawaldar	242	8.4
Liberal Democrats	Francis Jakeman	180	6.2
Turnout			
Green hold			
Green hold			
Labour Co-op hold			

=== Southcote ===
Southcote
Party	Candidate	Votes	%
Labour	Debs Edwards	1,569	63.2
Labour	Jason Brock	1,424	57.4
Labour	John Ennis	1,356	54.6
Conservative	Gabriella Kirkby	651	26.2
Conservative	Robert Vickers	609	24.5
Conservative	Ben Blackmore	578	23.3
Green	Sarah Watchman	408	16.4
Liberal Democrats	Riccardo Mancuso-Marcello	283	11.4
TUSC	Neil Adams	85	3.4
Turnout			32.0
Labour hold			
Labour hold			
Labour hold			

=== Thames ===
Thames
Party	Candidate	Votes	%
Labour	Adele Barnett-Ward	1,272	65.2
Labour	Richard Davies	1,143	58.6
Labour	Nusrat Sultan	1,027	52.6
Green	Anthea West	507	26.0
Conservative	David Cozens	466	23.9
Conservative	Daisy Parsons	438	22.5
Conservative	Abdoulaye Sow	354	18.1
Liberal Democrats	Vania Costa-Krol	294	15.1
Turnout			35.0
Labour win (new seat)			
Labour win (new seat)			
Labour win (new seat)			

=== Tilehurst ===
Tilehurst
Party	Candidate	Votes	%
Liberal Democrats	Meri O'Connell	1,427	56.4
Liberal Democrats	James Moore	1,160	45.9
Liberal Democrats	Anne Thompson	1,129	44.6
Conservative	Sandra Vickers	634	25.1
Conservative	Casey Byrne	633	25.0
Conservative	Russell Frain	466	23.2
Labour	Benjamin Perry-Stone	410	16.2
Labour	Malcolm Powers	406	16.2
Labour	Sikandar Hayat	400	15.8
Green	Gabriel Berry-Khan	272	10.8
Turnout			
Liberal Democrats hold			
Liberal Democrats hold			
Liberal Democrats gain from Conservative			

=== Whitley ===
Whitley
Party	Candidate	Votes	%
Labour	Rachel Eden	1,285	66.6
Labour	Micky Leng	1,153	59.8
Labour	Alice Mpofu-Coles	1,087	56.3
Conservative	Nick Brown	484	25.1
Conservative	Femi Afolabi	450	23.3
Conservative	Vani Goel	406	21.0
Green	Kathleen Smith	300	15.6
Liberal Democrats	Ian Westby	217	11.2
Turnout			26.0
Labour hold			
Labour hold			
Labour hold			
