= Murder of Olly Stephens =

Murder of a 13-year-old boy in Berkshire in 2021

Olly Stephens
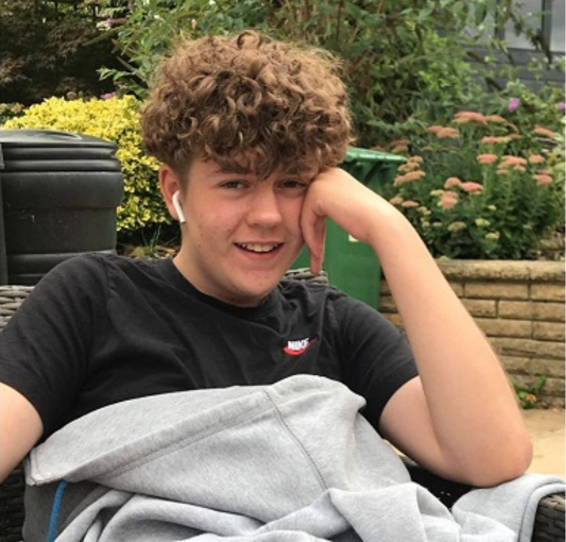
- Olly Stephens
- Born: Oliver Lucas Stephens; 1 November 2007; England
- Died: 3 January 2021 (aged 13); Reading, Berkshire
- Cause of death: Murder

Oliver Lucas Stephens (1 November 2007 – 3 January 2021) was a 13-year-old schoolboy who was fatally stabbed near his home in Reading in Berkshire, England, on 3 January 2021. He had been lured to a field by a 14-year-old girl, where he was attacked by two boys aged 13 and 14, the younger of whom was armed with a knife.

In July 2021, the two boys were each convicted of murder and sentenced to a minimum of 12 and 13 years' imprisonment. The girl pleaded guilty to manslaughter and was sentenced to be detained in a Young Offender Institution for three years and two months, which was later increased on appeal.

The murder attracted considerable media attention, primarily because of the young ages of the victim and the perpetrators. Considerable scrutiny was paid to the role played by social media and knife culture in the attack, with Stephens's parents calling for more stringent regulation of social media companies.

As they are under the age of 18, English law prohibits the identification of the perpetrators.

The criminal investigation, in particular the social media and other digital evidence obtained as part of the case, was the subject of an episode of a Channel 4 documentary, Murder Case: The Digital Detectives.

== Background ==
Olly Stephens was born on 1 November 2007. He lived in Emmer Green, a suburb of Reading, Berkshire. He had been diagnosed with autism shortly before he was murdered.

Social media played a significant role in the events leading to the murder. In the weeks before his death, Stephens had seen a video posted to Snapchat showing a young boy being humiliated by two older boys. He tried to alert the boy's brother by forwarding the video to him. This outraged the two older boys in the video, who accused Stephens of "snitching".

The two boys sought to recruit a girl to lure Stephens to a location where he could be attacked. The girl, who knew Stephens in real life, met his two assailants online and only saw them in person for the first time on the day of the murder. Through voice notes later recovered during the police investigation, the boys discussed their plan to attack Stephens, saying they would "give him bangs [hit him] or stab him". In another voice note, the 14-year-old girl claimed to be "excited" that one of the boys planned to "bang [hit] him and pattern [humiliate] him and shit".

Many of the voice notes recovered discussed knives. Videos of the boys showing off knives were found on their mobile phones.

== Attack ==
On 3 January 2021, the girl arranged to meet Stephens at Bugs Bottom, a field close to his home, shortly before 5 pm. Stephens believed the girl would be alone, but when he arrived he was "ambushed" by the two boys. The 13-year-old boy was armed with a knife.

Stephens was physically attacked by the two boys, initially using their fists. He defended himself, with one of the boys stating at trial that Stephens had managed to knock him to the ground. After a short while, the younger boy produced the knife he was carrying and stabbed Stephens twice. The two boys and the girl then fled the scene.

An off-duty nurse, who was walking her dog at Bugs Bottom, witnessed the stabbing and gave first aid to Stephens. Paramedics performed CPR on him for 30 minutes, but he died in an ambulance before he could be taken to hospital. Stephens's parents were told of the attack by another boy, and arrived at the field to find paramedics working on their son. They later recalled knowing he was "gone" when they saw him.

Following the attack, the two boys attempted to destroy or conceal evidence. They disposed of bloodstained clothing by throwing it into an overgrown area close to a railway line, and deleted incriminating material from their mobile phones. They later searched the internet for reports about the stabbing.

Two hours after Stephens died, the older boy admitted his role in a text message sent to another teenager, telling him, "Boy it was me and my boy innit. I started slapping him up and then my boy backed out and then shanked [stabbed] him." The younger boy, who had actually wounded Stephens, described it as "the biggest mistake of my life" in another text message, and said it was done "out of pure anger".

== Trial and sentencing ==
The murder was investigated by detectives from Thames Valley Police. The perpetrators were quickly identified and were charged on 6 January. Over 90% of the evidence gathered and presented at trial was taken from mobile phone data, although forensic evidence from the boys' recovered clothing was also adduced.

The two boys were charged with murder, which they denied. Both were also charged with two counts of perverting the course of justice, relating to attempts to dispose of evidence following the stabbing. Both admitted one count, but denied the other.

The 14-year-old girl was charged with Stephens's manslaughter for luring him to the field, and to perverting the course of justice for deleting incriminating data from her mobile phone. She pleaded guilty to both offences.

On 26 July 2021, after a five-week trial, both boys were unanimously convicted of murder. The older boy was also convicted of perverting the course of justice, although the younger boy was acquitted of the same charge. Following the verdict, Stephens's parents called the killing a "callous and cold-hearted act" and called for more to be done to stop knife crime.

All three defendants were sentenced on 24 September 2021. Both boys were sentenced to be detained at Her Majesty's pleasure, with minimum terms of 13 years for the younger boy and 12 years for the older boy. The sentences will initially be served in a Young Offender Institution (YOI). The 14-year-old girl was sentenced to three years and two months' detention in a YOI.

== Aftermath ==
In December 2021, the Court of Appeal decided that the sentence handed down to the girl was unduly lenient, and increased it to five years' imprisonment.

The murder attracted considerable media and public interest for the ages of the perpetrators and the role social media played in the attack. Stephens's parents claimed social media "played a massive part" in their son's death and called for it to face tighter regulation by the government. In particular, they said that social media companies should do more to verify the age of users and to prevent children from seeing violent or otherwise harmful content.

In June 2022, a BBC News investigation found that social media accounts set up to resemble those of a 13-year-old boy were recommended posts "showing off knives, knives for sale and videos glorifying violence" within only a few weeks of liking and interacting with content relating to sports, popular music and gaming.

== See also ==
- Murder of Shakilus Townsend
