= Katesgrove =

Neighbourhood and electoral ward of Reading, Berkshire, England

Coordinates: 51.444°N 0.968°W

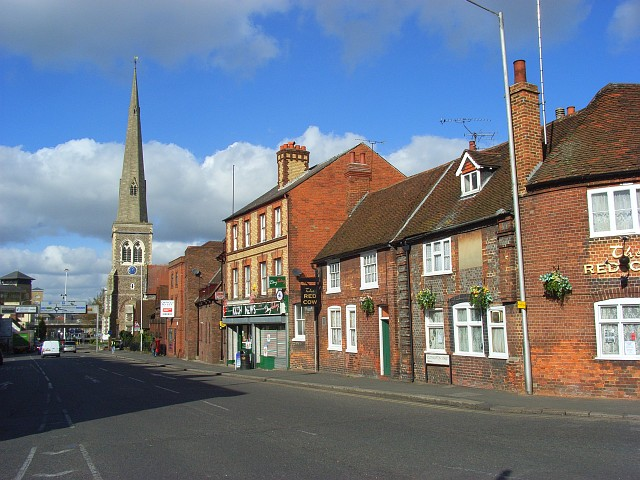
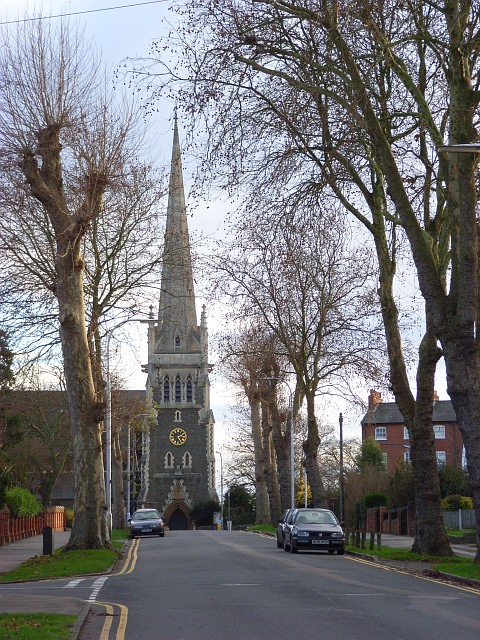
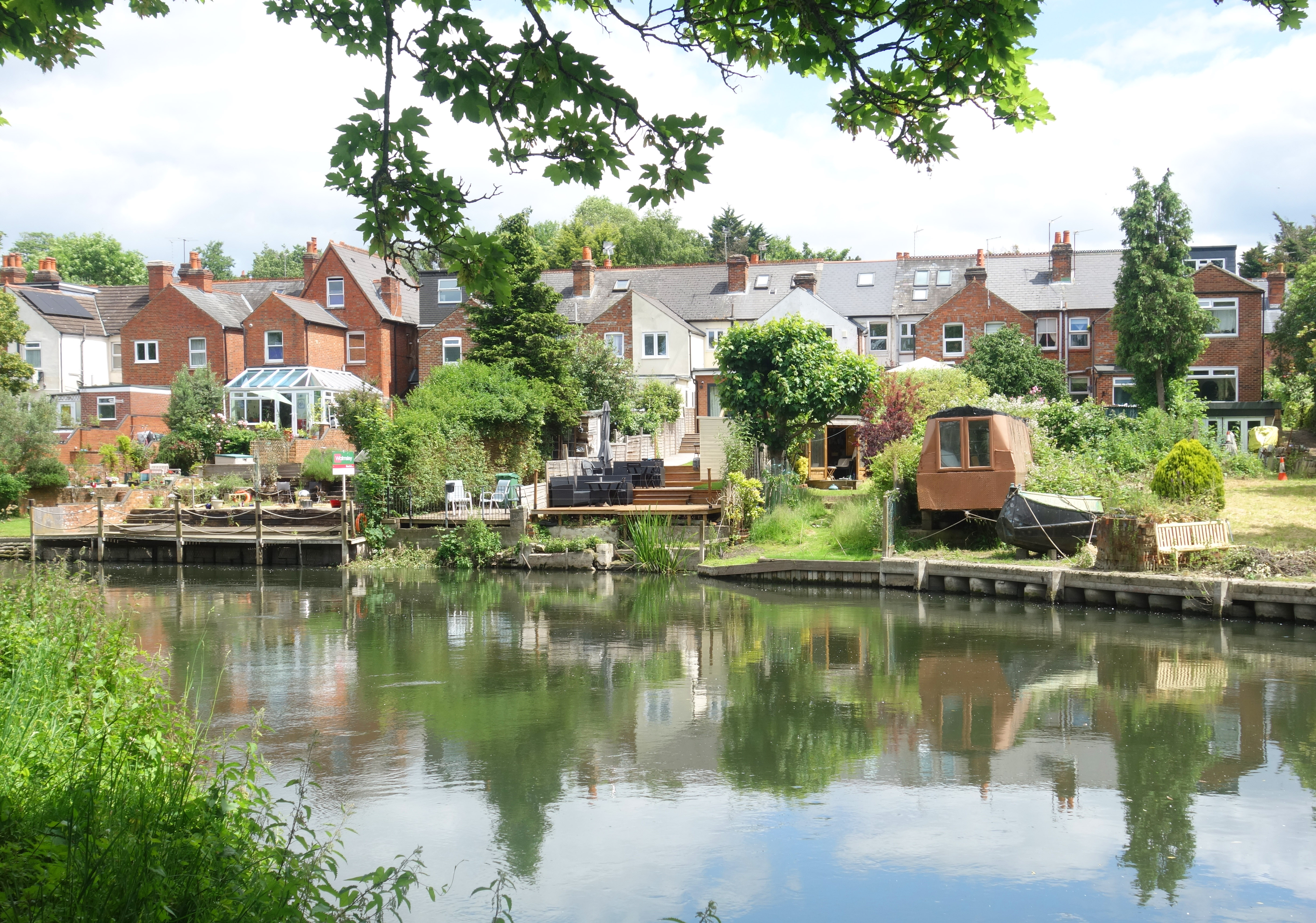
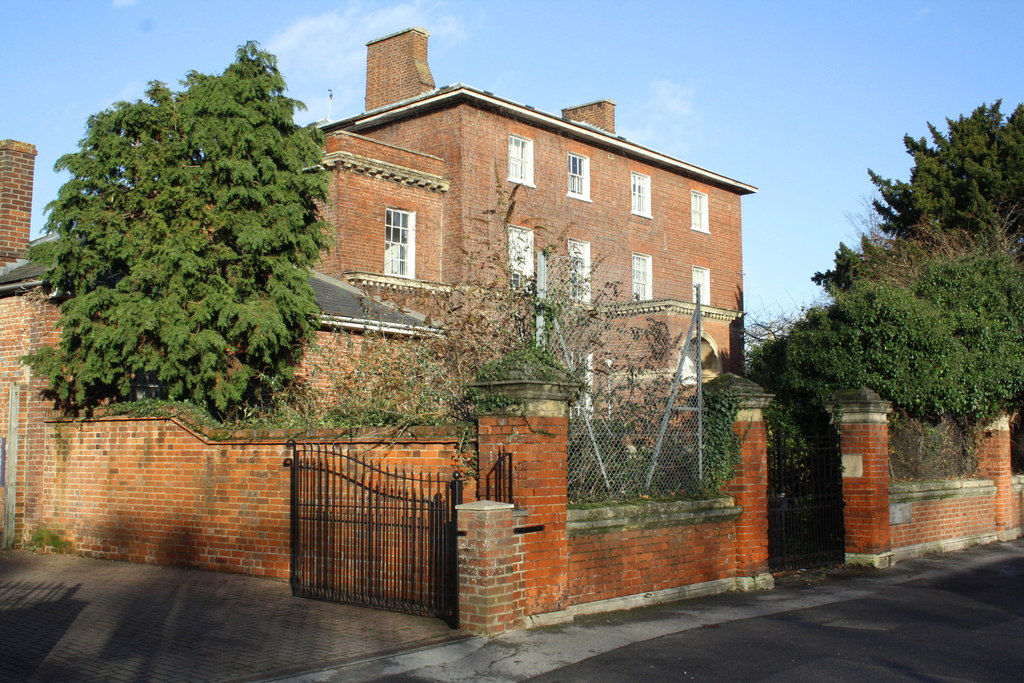
- Clockwise from top left: Southampton Street and St Giles' Church, Kendrick Road and Christ Church, London Road frontage of Kendrick School and back gardens of Elgar Road by the Kennet

- Location within Berkshire
- Area: 1.521 km^{2} (0.587 sq mi)
- Population: 12,857
  - Density: 8,453/km^{2} (21,890/sq mi)
- OS grid reference: SU715726
- Unitary authority: Reading
- Ceremonial county: Berkshire
- Region: South East
- Country: England
- Sovereign state: United Kingdom
- Post town: Reading
- Postcode district: RG1 and RG2
- Dialling code: 0118
- Police: Thames Valley
- Fire: Royal Berkshire
- Ambulance: South Central
- UK Parliament: Reading Central

Katesgrove is an inner-town neighbourhood and electoral ward situated immediately to the south of the town centre of Reading, Berkshire, England. The named area and ward are largely, but not entirely, coterminous.

In the most, Katesgrove comprises a dense network of narrow streets lined with Victorian terrace houses, many with ornate polychrome brickwork.

== History ==
The neighbourhood developed around the road from Reading to Winchester, which is now known as Southampton Street. In the north of Katesgrove is St Giles Church, dating back to the 12th century and one of the three original parish churches serving the medieval borough of Reading. Katesgrove House was one of the most significant buildings until it was demolished in 1873 to make way for Katesgrove School.

Industries included the Reading Ironworks, active from 1818, and the Philbrick tannery, opened on Katesgrove Lane in the 1830s. Brickmaking was also a long-standing tradition in the area.

== Location ==
=== Traditional ===
The traditional definition of the neighbourhood of Katesgrove is bounded on the north by the Inner Distribution Road, on the east by Sidmouth Street, Kendrick Road and Northumberland Avenue, on the south by Long Barn Lane and Rose Kiln Lane and on the west by the River Kennet.

=== Electoral ward ===
The Katesgrove electoral ward of the Borough of Reading corresponds closely to the neighbourhood. In addition to the traditional definition of Katesgrove (as given above), the ward includes a strip of land between the A33 and the River Kennet, including the flats on the site of the Reading Central goods depot and the commercial buildings to the south, that would more normally be regarded as part of the neighbourhoods of Coley and Coley Park.

The ward is bordered by Abbey, Redlands, Church, Whitley and Coley wards and forms part of the Reading Central parliamentary constituency.

== Ward profile ==
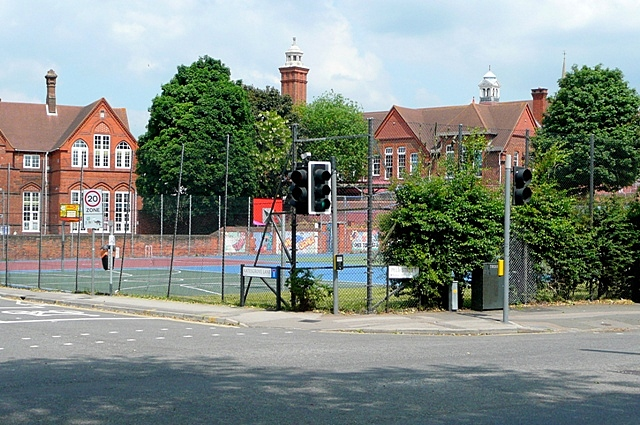
Katesgrove School, one of Katesgrove's three primary schools

=== Demographics ===
As of 2024, Katesgrove ward had an area of 1.521 square kilometres (0.587 sq mi) and there were 12,857 people living there. Of these, 16% were under 15 and 5.8% were 65 and over; 56.4% classified themselves as White, 26.4% as Asian, and 7.9% as Black, Caribbean or African; 51.4% were born outside the UK.

The population was predominantly Christian in the 2021 Census with 42.8% identifying as Christian. The second largest group was ‘No Religion’ with 34.6% of the population. Muslims were the third largest group with 10.1% of the population, followed by Hindus (7.6%), Buddhists (3.0%), Sikhs (0.7%), Jews (0.1%) and those with other religions (0.9%).

The population lived in 4,641 households, of which 48.1% were in a flat, maisonette or apartment, and 51.7% were in a house or bungalow. Of the households, 11.5% were owned outright by the residents, 21.2% were owned subject to a mortgage, loan or shared ownership, 53.0% were privately rented and 14.2% were socially rented.

Of the population aged over 16, 66.6% were in employment, 4.9% were unemployed, and 28.5% were economically inactive. Of those in employment, 46.5% were in managerial, professional or technical occupations. A total of 43.2% of the population were educated to university degree level.

=== Environment ===
As of 2022, Katesgrove ward had a tree canopy cover of 13.2%, compared to figures of 17.7% for the Reading as a whole, and 16.5% for the United Kingdom. The most significant open spaces are Longbarn Lane Recreation Ground and Waterloo Meadows.

=== Facilities ===
The ward includes Katesgrove, New Christ Church and the Palmer Academy primary schools, and Kendrick Grammar School. The parish churches of St Giles and Christ Church are both in the ward.

== Representation ==
Katesgrove elects three councillors to the unitary Reading Borough Council, with each elected in separate years for a four-year term.

Traditionally an area of strength for the Labour Party, one of Katesgrove's councillors was Labour's David Sutton, who was leader of the council for thirteen years before his defeat by a Liberal Democrat, Warren Swaine, in 2008. The 2000s witnessed a surge in votes for the Liberal Democrats, resulting in 2007 with the election of Gareth Epps, who, in the 2010 general election, contested the Reading East constituency and achieved second place in that election - culminating in 2010 with all Katesgrove councillors being Liberal Democrats. However, the 2011 council election saw Labour candidate Matt Rodda, who is now MP for Reading Central, elected, and over the following years Labour regained the remaining seats.

In the 2022 election, at which all councillors faced re-election because of boundary changes, a swing from the Labour Party to the Green Party led to the latter gaining two of the three seats. As of 2026, the councillors are Doug Cresswell, Louise Keane and Kaisa Nikulina, all of the Green Party.

== Notable people ==
- Fred Potts VC, holder of the Victoria Cross.
