= Murder of Shakilus Townsend =

2008 murder

Shakilus Townsend was a 16-year-old boy who was attacked on 3 July 2008 in Thornton Heath, south London by members of the Shine My Nine (SMN) gang. He was taken to St George's Hospital but died shortly after on 4 July 2008.

Townsend had become romantically involved with 15-year-old Samantha Joseph who already had a boyfriend, 18-year-old Danny McLean. When McLean found out, he threatened to dump Joseph but she persuaded him to attack Townsend in a honey trap. McLean, Joseph and five other teenagers were found guilty of murder and in 2009, all seven were jailed for life. One of the gang members involved in the murder, Andre Thompson, was released from prison in 2022.

The murder was the subject of a 2012 BBC documentary, My Murder.

== See also ==
- Murder of Olly Stephens

== Sources ==
- Jessica Southgate (2011). Seeing differently: Working with girls affected by gangs (PDF) (Thesis). The Griffins Society.
- J. J. Pearce; J. M. Pitts (2011). "Youth gangs, sexual violence and sexual exploitation" (PDF). London: The Office of the Children's Commissioner for England.
- Simon Harding (2014). The Street Casino. pp. 219–242. doi:10.51952/9781447317203.ch012.
- François Haut (2015). "Organized Crime Behind Bars" (PDF). International Journal on Criminology. 3 (2).
- Youth in Crisis? 'Gangs', Territoriality and Violence. London. 2011. doi:10.4324/9780203832004. ISBN 9780203832004.
