= Thames (Reading ward) =

Electoral ward of Reading, Berkshire since 2022

Coordinates: 51.461°N 0.968°W

Thames Ward, Borough of Reading
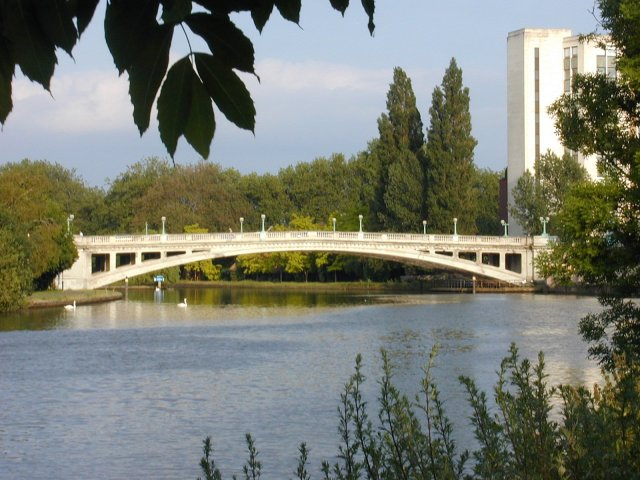
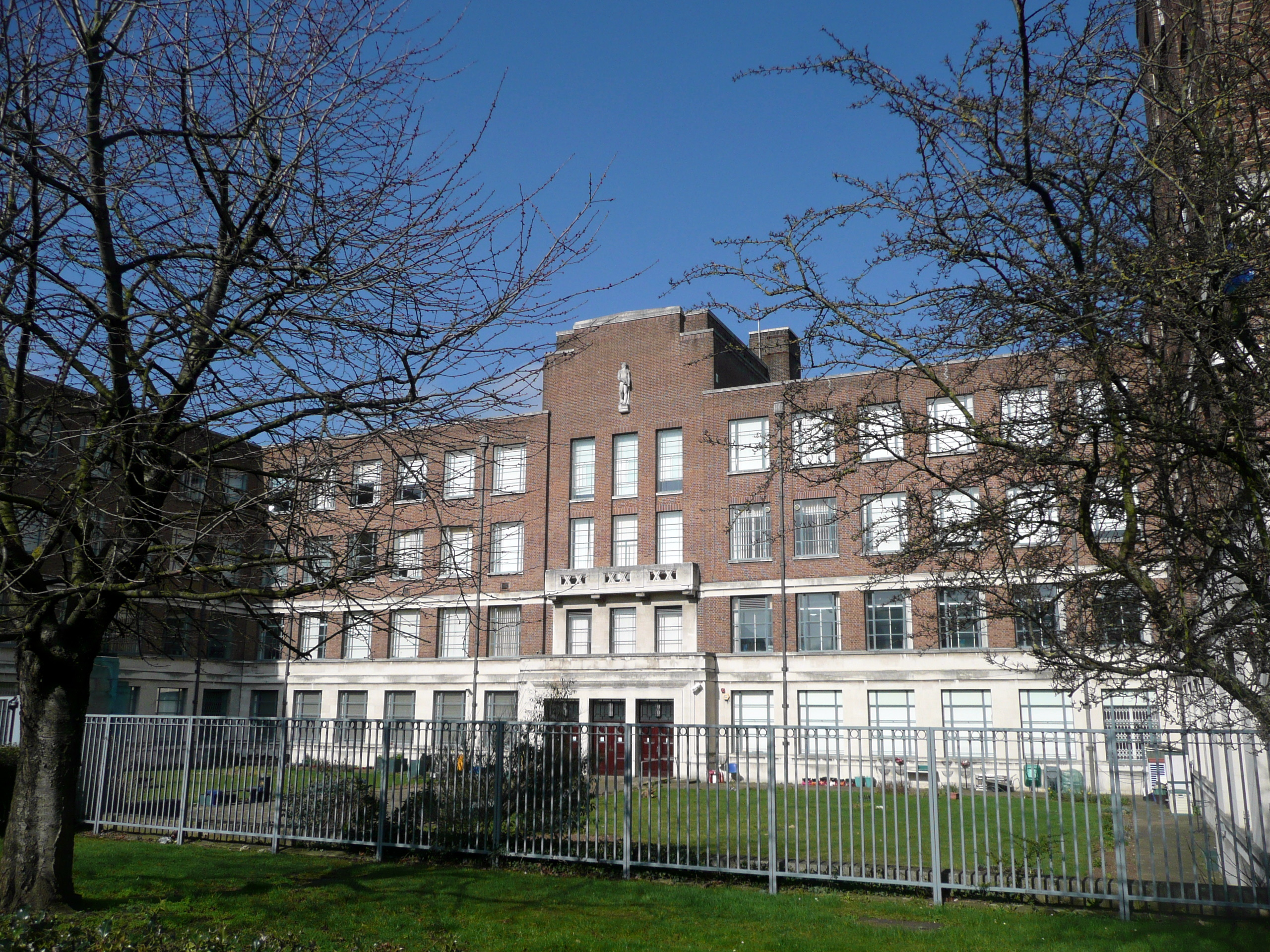
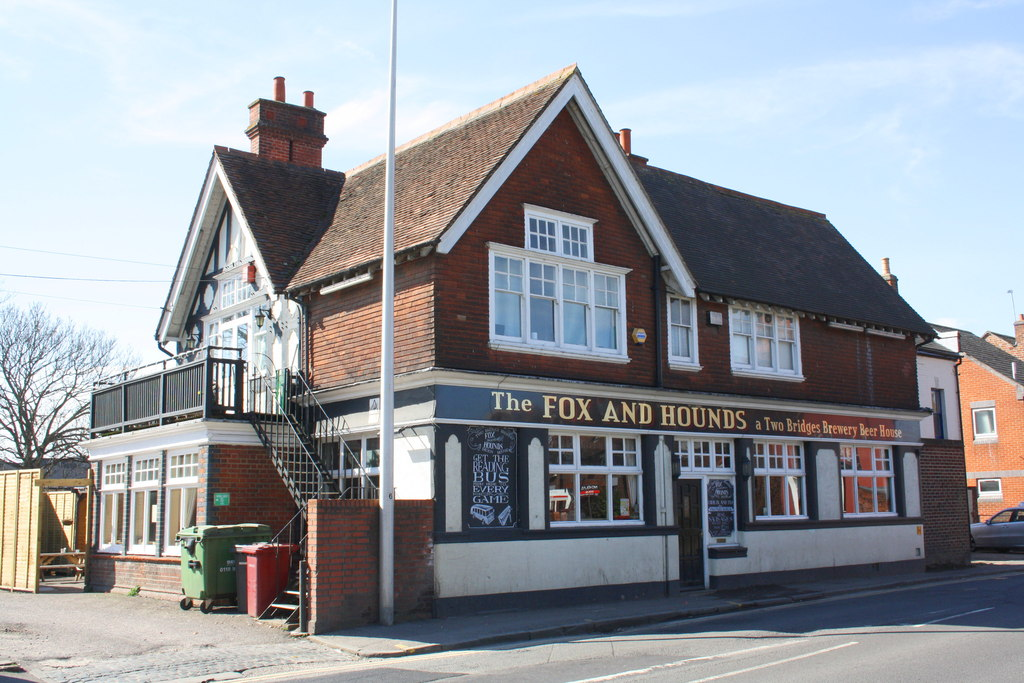
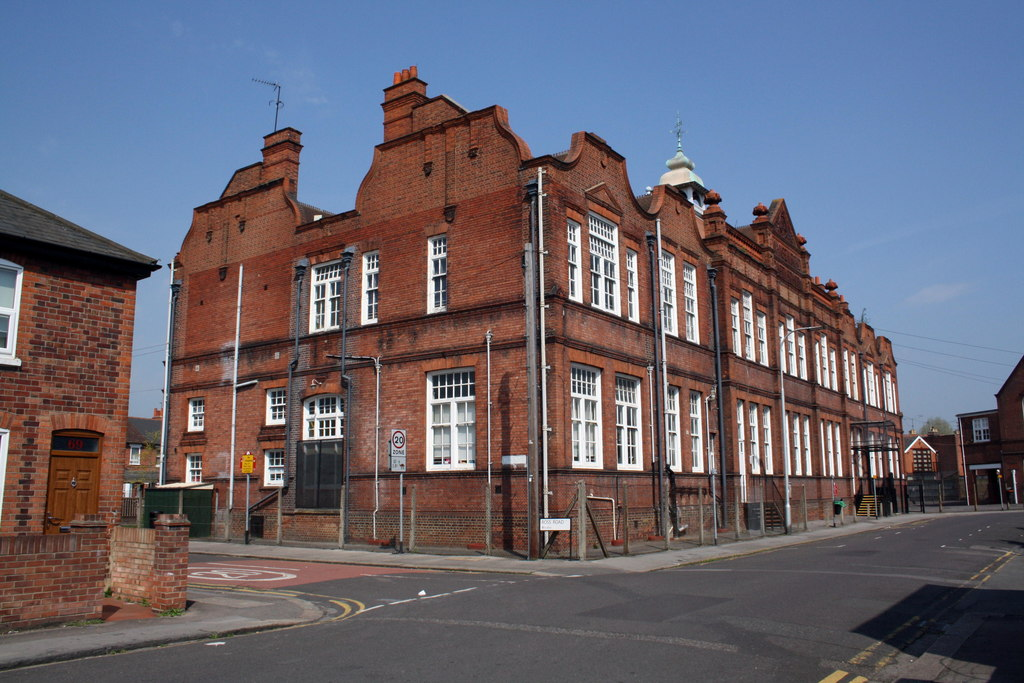
- Clockwise from top left: Reading Bridge, Reading College, EP Collier School, The Fox and Hounds

- Location within Berkshire
- Area: 2.316 km^{2} (0.894 sq mi)
- Population: 8,442
  - Density: 3,645/km^{2} (9,440/sq mi)
- OS grid reference: SU717741
- Unitary authority: Reading
- Ceremonial county: Berkshire
- Region: South East
- Country: England
- Sovereign state: United Kingdom
- Police: Thames Valley
- Fire: Royal Berkshire
- Ambulance: South Central
- UK Parliament: Reading Central

Thames is an electoral ward of the Borough of Reading, in the English county of Berkshire. It was created in the boundary changes prior to the 2022 Reading Borough Council election and should not be confused with the ward of the same name that existed prior to that election, with which it has no area in common.

== Location ==
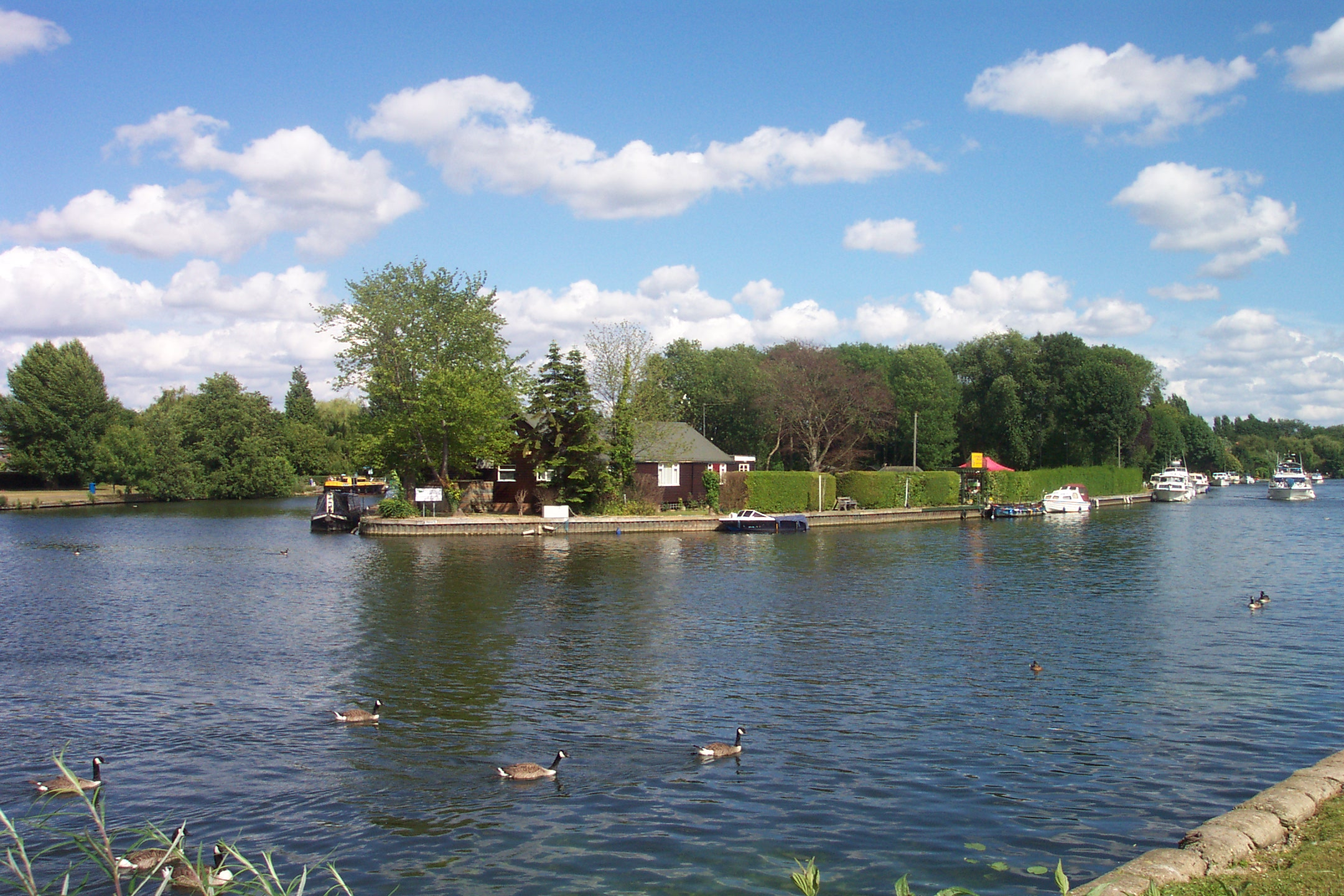
The River Thames in Thames ward; both banks and Fry's Island in the middle are in the ward

Thames ward includes areas on both sides of both the River Thames and the River Kennet, to the north and east of the centre of Reading on the south bank, and to the south and east of the centre of Caversham on the north bank.

From the north-west in clockwise order, Thames Ward is bounded by the river Thames, Caversham Bridge, Abbotsmead Place, School Lane, and Gosbrook Road, including, in places, properties on both sides of the road. The ward boundary then loops to the east of Deans Farm, before following the river Thames again as far as Kennet Mouth, from where it proceeds up the river Kennet. It then cuts south through New Town to the Kings Road, which it follows to Forbury Road and the Vastern Road railway bridge. It then follows the Great Western Main Line as far as Cow Lane, which it follows back to the Thames.

The ward shares borders with Caversham Heights, Caversham, Park, Redlands, Abbey and Battle wards of the Borough of Reading, along with the civil parish of Eye and Dunsden in Oxfordshire, and with the civil parish of Earley in the Borough of Wokingham. The whole of the ward lies within the Reading Central parliamentary constituency.

The ward includes stretches of both the River Thames and River Kennet, with several riverine islands including Pipers Island, Fry's Island and View Island, and several riverside parks including Thameside Promenade, Christchurch Meadows, Hills Meadow and Kings Meadow.

== Profile ==
=== Demographics ===
As of 2024, Thames ward had an area of 2.316 square kilometres (0.894 sq mi) and there were 8,442 people living there. Of these, 16.5% were under 15 and 8.7% were 65 and over; 61.2% classified themselves as White, 22.2% as Asian, and 8.1% as Black, Caribbean or African; 42.0% were born outside the UK.

The population lived in approximately 3.526 households, of which 52.6% were in a flat, maisonette or apartment, and 47.1% were in a house or bungalow. Of the households, 15.0% were owned outright by the residents, 23.8% were owned subject to a mortgage, loan or shared ownership, 42.6% were privately rented and 18.6% were socially rented.

Of the population aged over 16, 70.7% were in employment, 3.7% were unemployed, and 25.5% were economically inactive. Of those in employment, 64.0% were in managerial, professional or technical occupations. A total of 56.5% of the population were educated to university degree level.

=== Environment ===
As of 2022, Thames ward had a tree canopy cover of 13.8%, compared to figures of 17.7% for the Reading as a whole, and 16.5% for the United Kingdom. The ward includes a considerable amount of open space, including all or part of Thameside Promenade, Christchurch Meadows, Hills Meadow, View Island and Kings Meadow.

=== Facilities ===
The ward includes EP Collier, St Johns and Thameside primary schools, but no secondary schools. The main campus of Reading College is also within the ward, as is the northern entrance to Reading railway station.

== Representation ==
As with all Reading wards, the ward elects three councillors to Reading Borough Council. Elections are generally held by thirds, with elections in three years out of four. The ward councillors are currently Richard Davies and Ama Asare, both of whom are members of the Labour party, and David Clarke, a member of the Green party.
