= Emmer Green (Reading ward) =

Electoral ward in Reading, Berkshire, England

Coordinates: 51.481°N 0.958°W

Emmer Green Ward, Borough of Reading
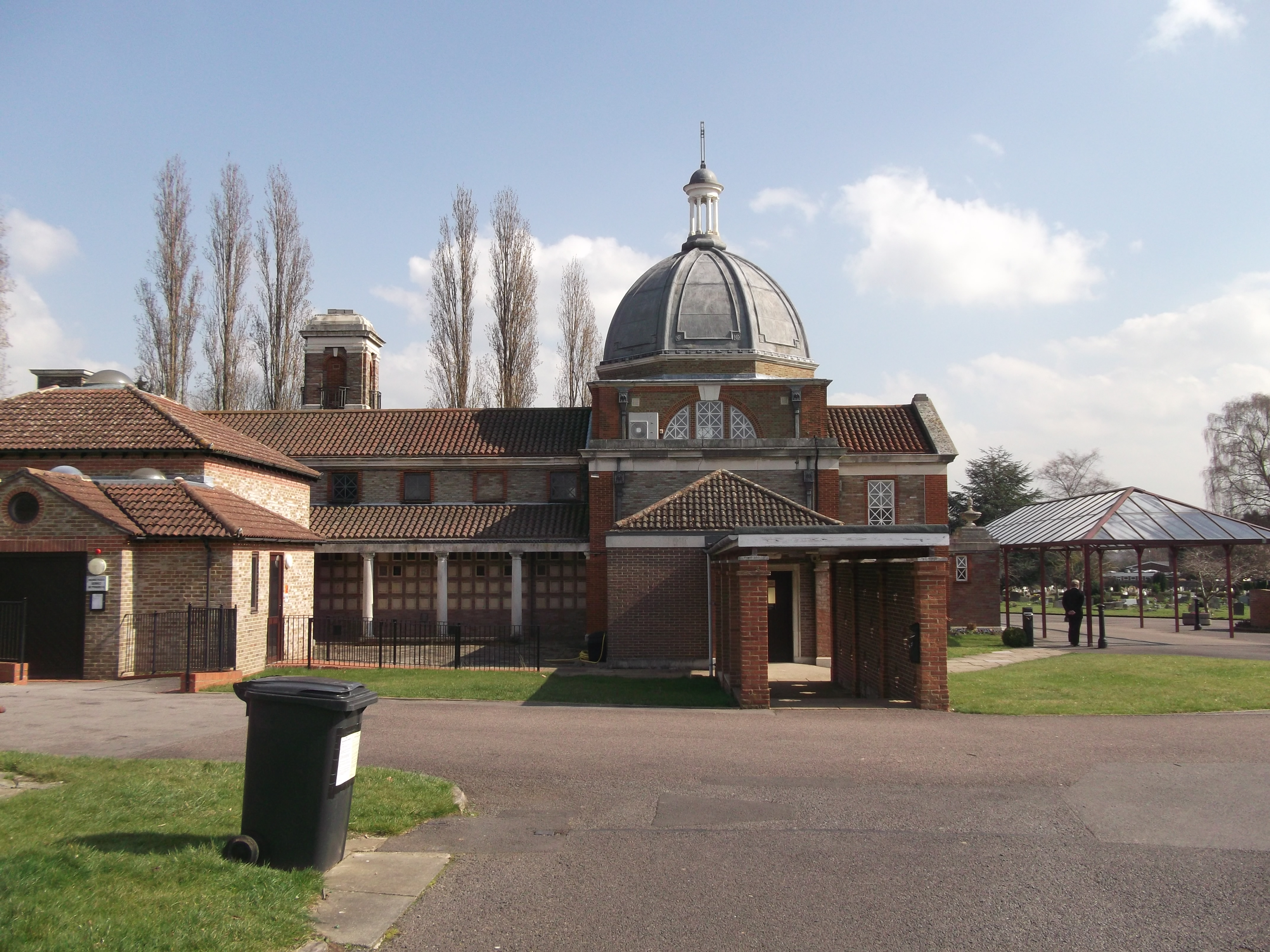
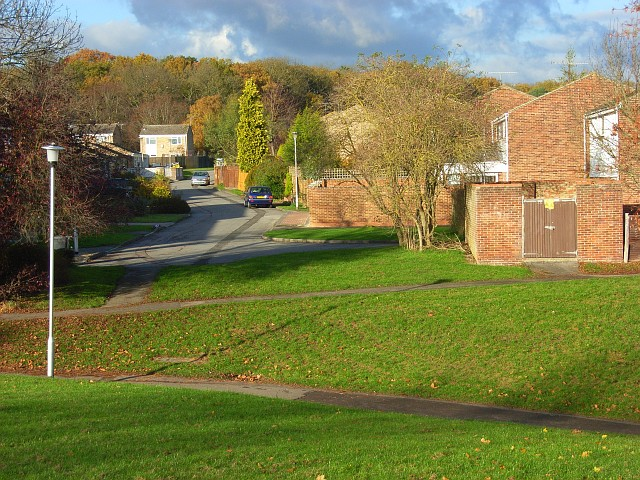
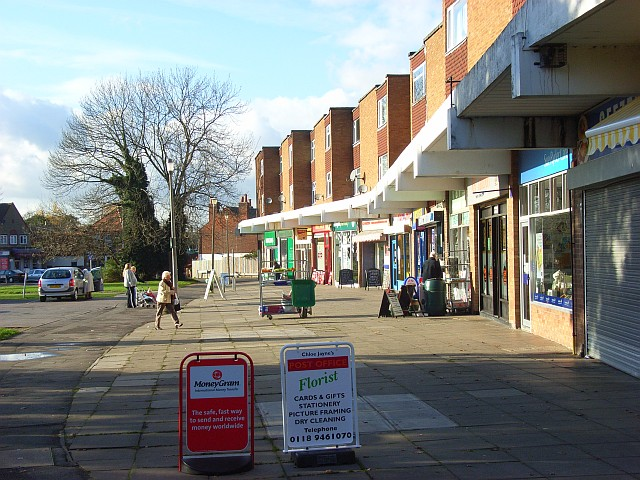
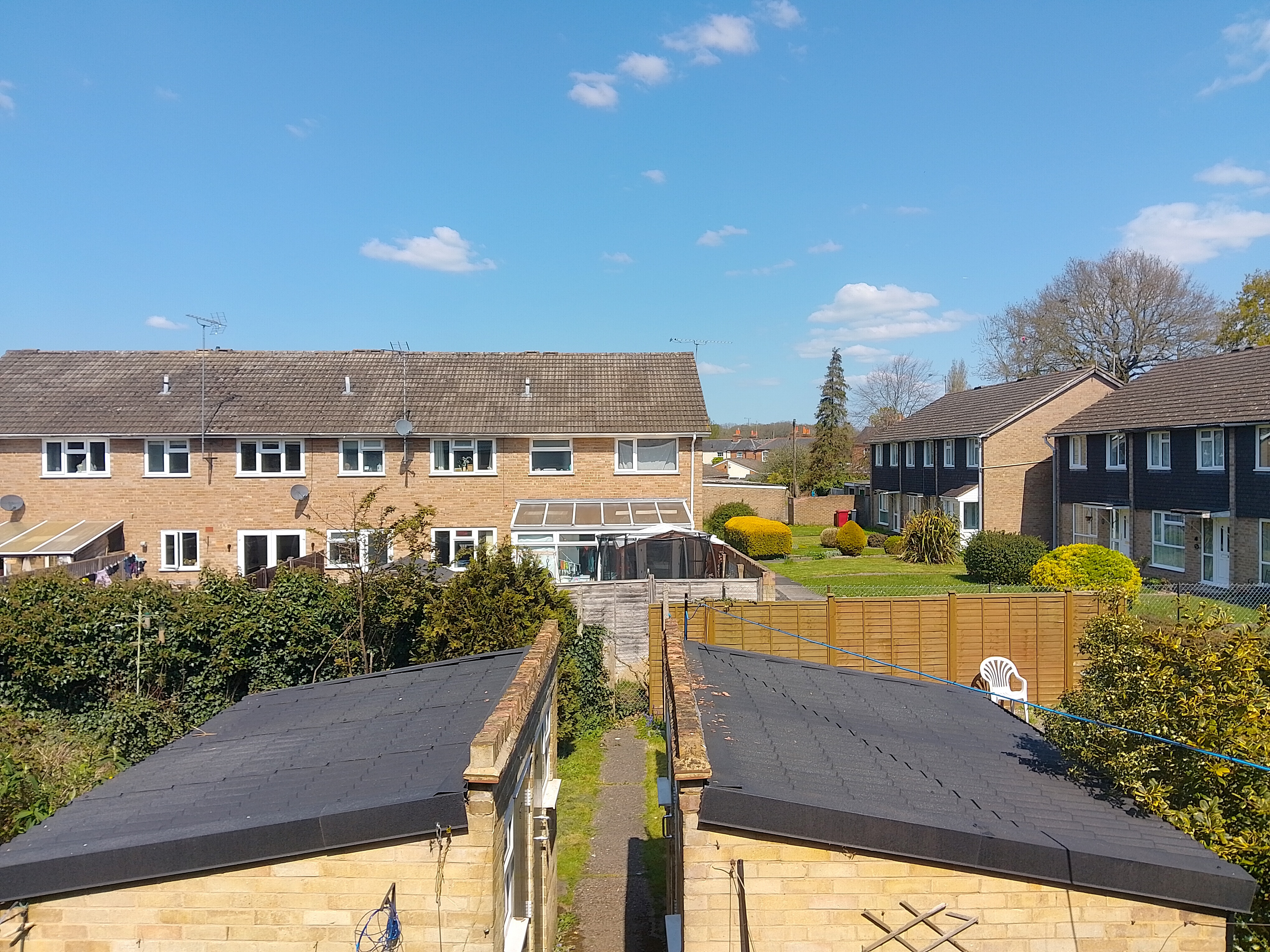
- Clockwise from top left: Reading Crematorium, Caversham Park Village, Emmer Green houses, Emmer Green shops

- Location within Berkshire
- Area: 3.302 km^{2} (1.275 sq mi)
- Population: 9,678
  - Density: 2,931/km^{2} (7,590/sq mi)
- OS grid reference: SU723764
- Unitary authority: Reading
- Ceremonial county: Berkshire
- Region: South East
- Country: England
- Sovereign state: United Kingdom
- Police: Thames Valley
- Fire: Royal Berkshire
- Ambulance: South Central
- UK Parliament: Reading Central

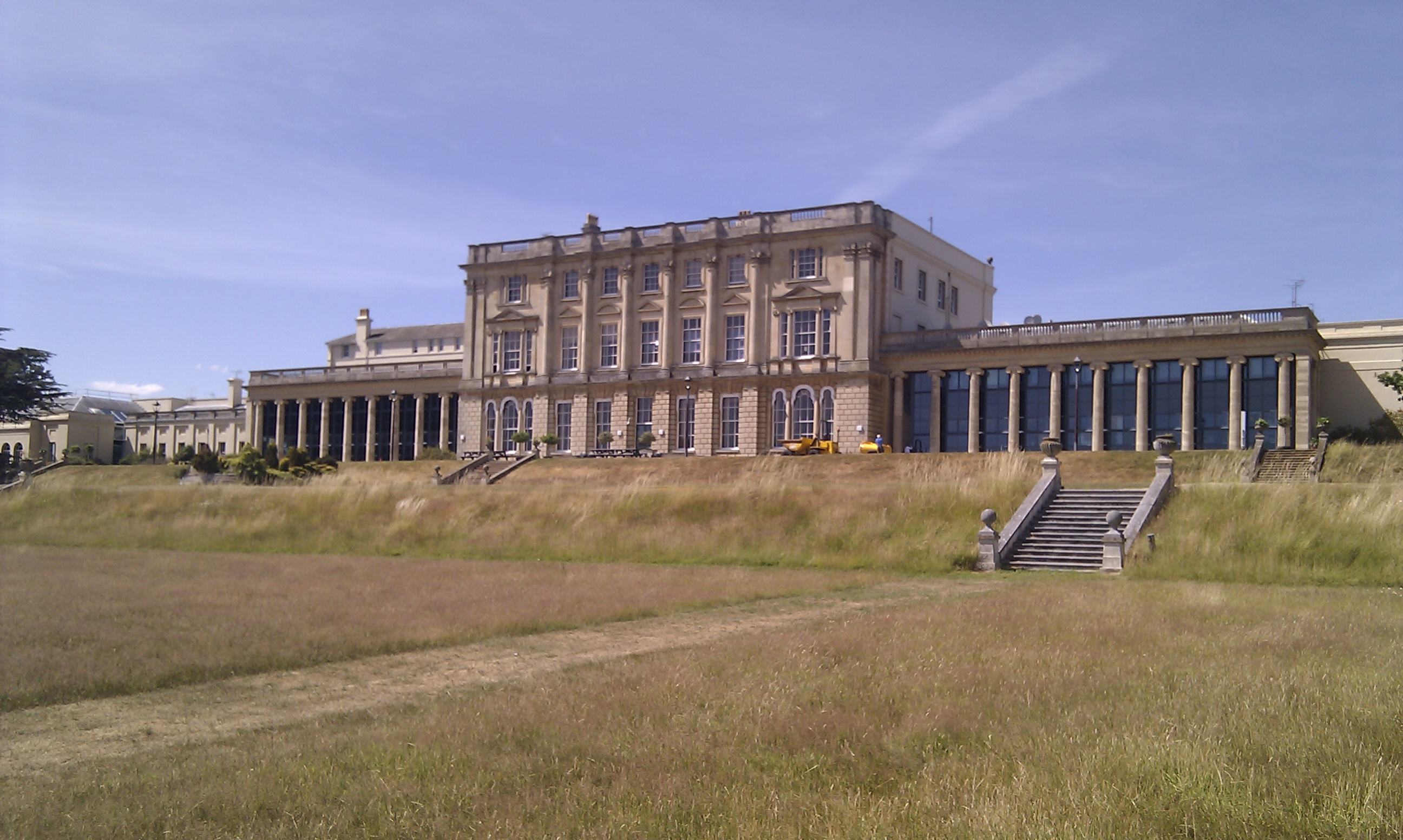
Caversham Park House

Emmer Green is an electoral ward of the Borough of Reading, in the English county of Berkshire. Until the 2022 Reading Borough Council election, it was known as Peppard ward and had slightly different boundaries.

== Location ==
The ward lies in Caversham, a village and suburb that was once an independent town on the north bank of the River Thames opposite Reading. As an area, Caversham also includes the wards of Caversham Heights and Caversham, together with part of the cross-river Thames ward. The ward is to the north and north-east of the commercial centre of Caversham, and includes most of the Emmer Green neighbourhood together with Caversham Park Village and other parts of Caversham.

From the north on Peppard Road, in clockwise order, the ward boundary follows the borough boundary behind the houses on Phillmore Road and across Clayfield Copse to meet Caversham Park Road, which it then loosely follows to the Henley Road. It then follows the Henley Road, including houses on both sides, as far as a point just before Chiltern Road.

The boundary then runs behind the houses on Chiltern Road, before taking an off-road route across to Peppard Road near its junction with Surley Row, and then behind the houses to the north of Balmore Drive as far as Rotherfield Way. It then follows Rotherfield Way, Evesham Road, St Barnabas Road and Highfield Hill Road back to the borough boundary, and hence back to Peppard Road.

The ward is bordered by the Caversham Heights and Caversham wards of Reading Borough Council, and by the civil parishes of Kidmore End and Eye and Dunsden in South Oxfordshire. The whole of the ward lies within the Reading Central parliamentary constituency.

== Profile ==
=== Demographics ===
As of 2024, Emmer Green ward had an area of 3.302 square kilometres (1.275 sq mi) and there were 9,678 people living there. Of these, 17.4% were under 15 and 23% were 65 and over; 83.6% classified themselves as White, 8.5% as Asian, and 2.5% as Black, Caribbean or African; 17.4% were born outside the UK.

The population lived in approximately 4,700 households, of which 11.8% were in a flat, maisonette or apartment, and 86.6% were in a house or bungalow. Of the households, 42.6% were owned outright by the residents, 39.1% were owned subject to a mortgage, loan or shared ownership, 12.5% were privately rented and 5.9% were socially rented.

Of the population aged over 16, 60.7% were in employment, 2.9% were unemployed, and 36.4% were economically inactive. Of those in employment, 57.4% were in managerial, professional or technical occupations. A total of 41.7% of the population were educated to university degree level.

=== Environment ===
As of 2022, Emmer Green ward had a tree canopy cover of 24.8%, compared to figures of 17.7% for the Reading as a whole, and 16.5% for the United Kingdom. The principal open spaces include Caversham Park and the Clayfield Copse nature reserve. The Reading Crematorium and its associated cemetery are also both within the ward.

=== Facilities ===
The ward includes Caversham Park, Emmer Green, Micklands, St Martins and The Hill primary schools, but no secondary schools; Highdown School is nearby but in Caversham Heights ward. The Church of St. Barnabas is in the ward.

There is a retail area clustered around the junction of Peppard Road, Kidmore End Road and Grove Road in Emmer Green, including the Milestone Way precinct, and a smaller retail precinct at Farnham Drive in Caversham Park Village.

== Representation ==
As with all Reading wards, the ward elects three councillors to Reading Borough Council. Elections since 2004 are generally held by thirds, with elections in three years out of four. The ward councillors are currently Stephen Goss and Alex Smith, both of whom are members of the Conservative party, and Daya Pal Singh, who is a member of the Labour party.
