= Mapledurham (Reading ward) =

Former electoral ward in Reading, Berkshire, United Kingdom

Mapledurham was an electoral ward of the Borough of Reading, in the English county of Berkshire, which was abolished in the boundary changes prior to the 2022 Reading Borough Council election. The ward's area was joined with part of that of the former Thames ward to form the new Caversham Heights ward.

The ward was located north-west of the town centre and formed the westernmost part of the suburb of Caversham. It lay north of the River Thames, and was bordered by Thames, Battle and Kentwood wards and by the district of South Oxfordshire. The ward took its name from the adjacent village of Mapledurham, which is actually outside the borough boundary in South Oxfordshire.

Mapledurham ward was unusual in that, unlike all the other Reading wards, it only elected one councillor to Reading Borough Council. Except where an unusual by-election is required, elections took place every four years, coinciding with the year of the Summer Olympic Games. In the 2021 council election, Councillor Isobel Ballsdon of the Conservative Party was elected, meaning she was the last person to represent the ward.
