= Bug's Bottom =

Public open space in Caversham in the English borough of Reading

- Hemdean Bottom
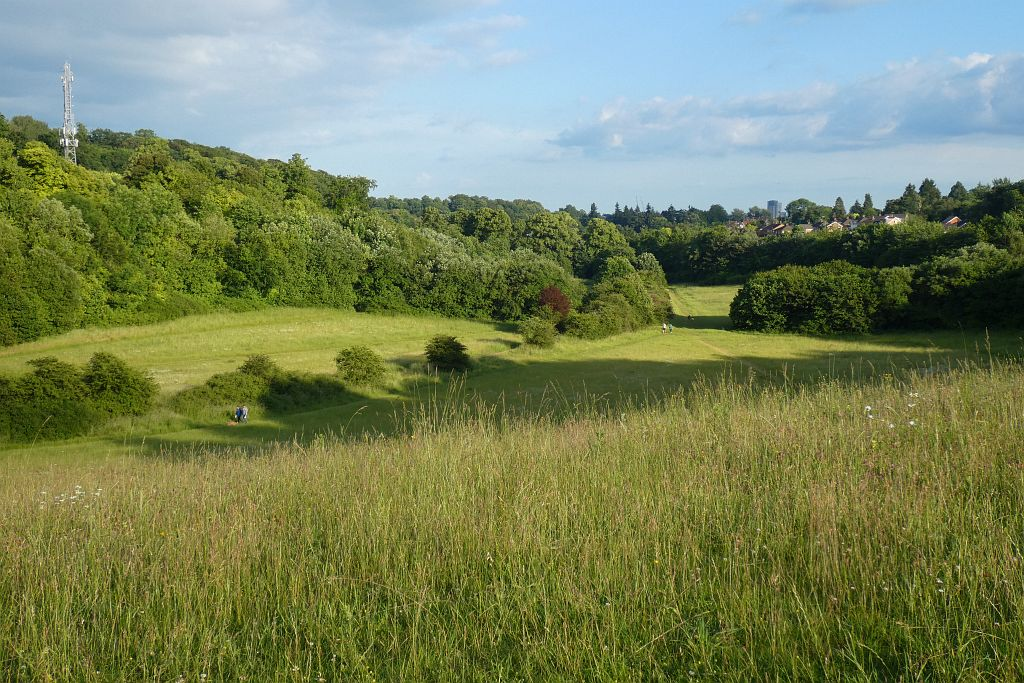
- Bug's Bottom

- Location within Reading, Berkshire
- Type: Public
- Location: Reading, Berkshire, UK
- Coordinates: 51°28′55″N 0°58′55″W
- Operator: Reading Borough Council

Bug's Bottom, also known as Bugs Bottom or Hemdean Bottom, is a public open space on the outskirts of the village and suburb of Caversham in the English town of Reading. It comprises a steep chalk bank that runs from east to west and slopes to the south in the form of a coombe. The site is managed as meadow grassland with a small mature woodland. Some planting has been carried out in order to screen adjacent housing.

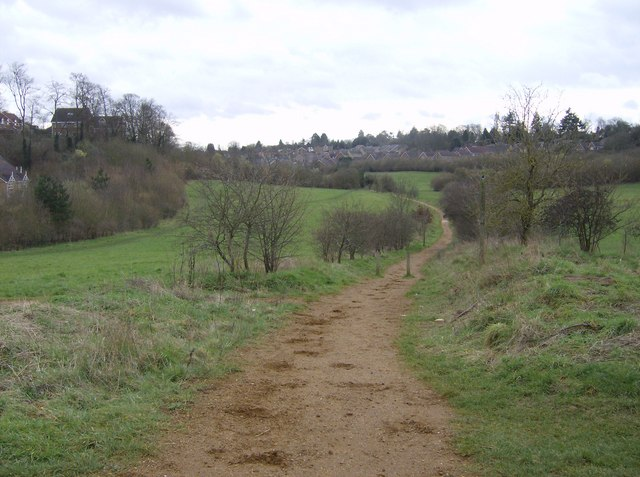
The bridleway, looking south with the residential areas of Emmer Green to the left and Caversham Heights to the right

At the foot of the coombe, the open space can be accessed via an alleyway from Hemdean Road. From here a bridleway allows cyclists and horses to pass through Bug's Bottom to the north, where it meets Gravel Hill, an old sunken lane, now closed to motorised traffic, that connects Emmer Green to Caversham Heights across the north of the open space.

Bug's Bottom forms the remains of an agricultural area that was acquired for development in the 1980s. This development was contested by existing local residents, but the developers eventually prevailed, and house building began in the mid-1990s. However, as part of the legal agreement, the land that now makes up the Bug's Bottom open space was not built-on, and was transferred into the ownership of Reading Borough Council.

In 2021, Bug's Bottom was the site of the murder of Olly Stephens, a 13-year-old schoolboy who was lured to the site and then fatally stabbed to death. The crime attracted much media attention, primarily because of the young ages of the victim and the perpetrators, and because of the role played by social media. A memorial bench, in the form of a sofa carved out of redwood, is now sited on the field.

== See also ==
- List of parks and open spaces in Reading, Berkshire
