= Thames (Reading ward pre-2022) =

Former electoral ward of Reading, Berkshire, abolished in 2022

Thames was an electoral ward of the Borough of Reading, in the English county of Berkshire, until it was abolished in the boundary changes prior to the 2022 Reading Borough Council election. It should not be confused with the ward of the same name that was created by those boundary changes, but which has no area in common with this former ward.

The ward lay in Caversham, a village and suburb that was once an independent town on the north bank of the River Thames opposite Reading. It was bordered by the wards of Caversham, Peppard and Mapledurham, together with Abbey ward across the river. The ward was within the then parliamentary constituency of Reading East.

As with all wards, apart from smaller Mapledurham, Thames elected three councillors to Reading Borough Council. Elections since 2004 were held by thirds, with elections in three years out of four. In the 2004 local elections, before the electoral format change, Thames was won by three Conservatives, one of whom, Rob Wilson went on to become the MP for Reading East. Between then and its abolition, it was won by Conservative candidates.
