= Caversham (Reading ward) =

Electoral ward in Reading, Berkshire, England

Coordinates: 51.471°N 0.968°W

Caversham Ward, Borough of Reading
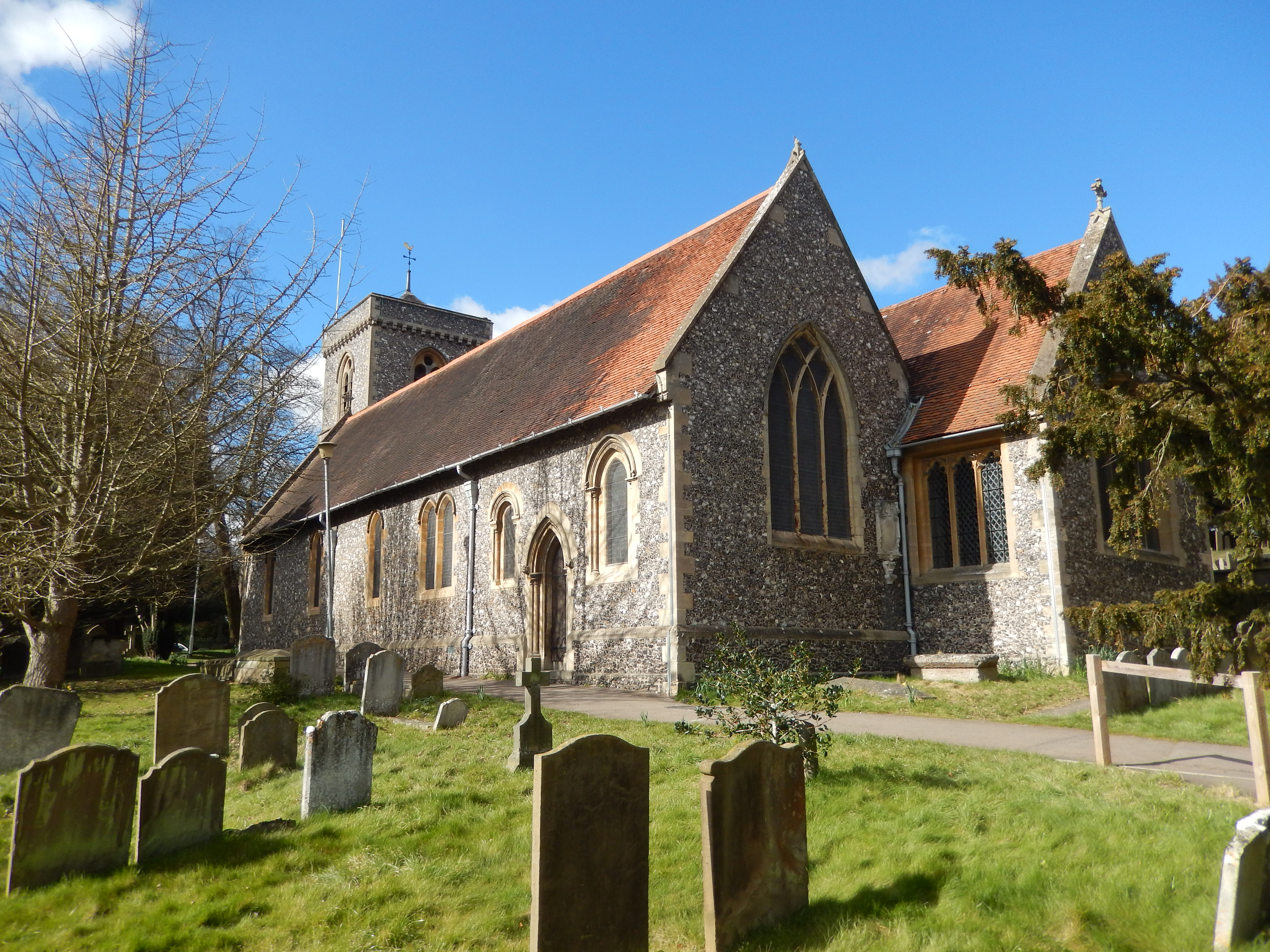
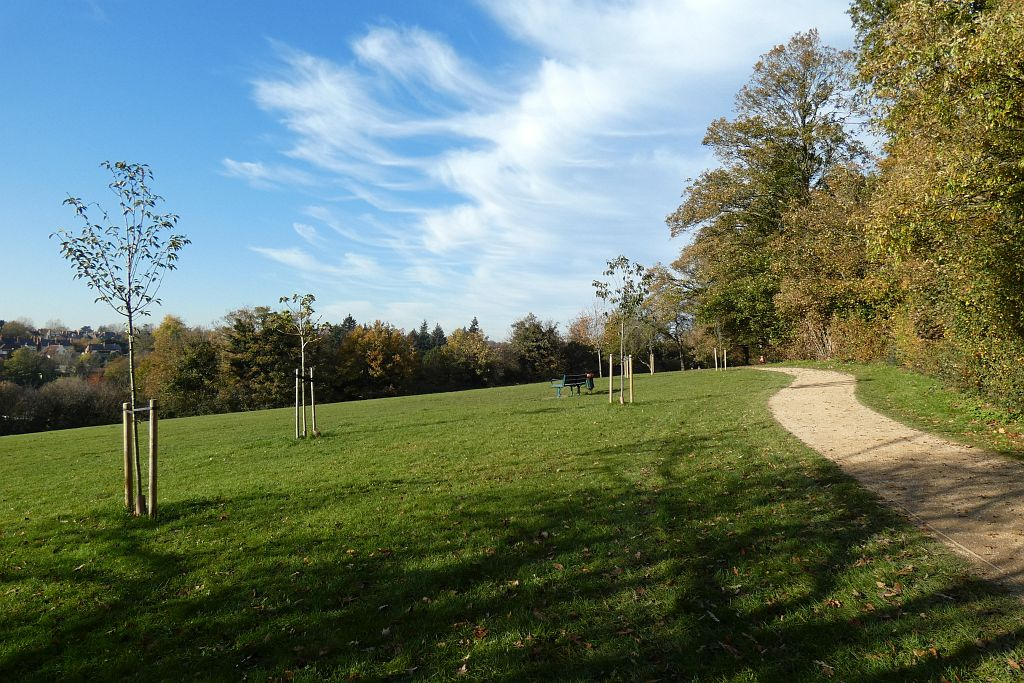
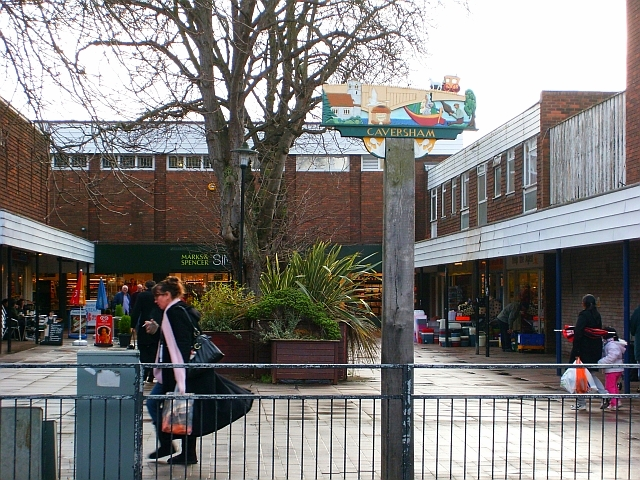
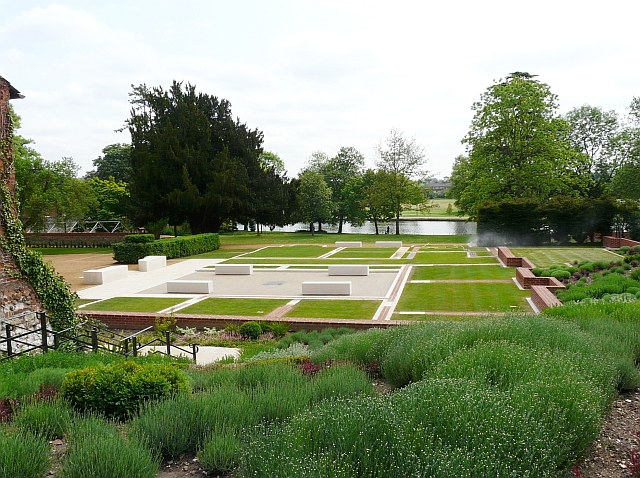
- Clockwise from top left: St Peter's Church, Balmore Walk, Caversham Court, St Martin's precinct

- Location within Berkshire
- Area: 2.192 km^{2} (0.846 sq mi)
- Population: 11,317
  - Density: 5,163/km^{2} (13,370/sq mi)
- OS grid reference: SU717752
- Unitary authority: Reading
- Ceremonial county: Berkshire
- Region: South East
- Country: England
- Sovereign state: United Kingdom
- Police: Thames Valley
- Fire: Royal Berkshire
- Ambulance: South Central
- UK Parliament: Reading Central

Caversham is an electoral ward of the Borough of Reading, in the English county of Berkshire. In a set of boundary changes in 2022, the boundaries of Caversham ward were significantly changed, gaining area from the former Thames ward in the north, but losing it in the south to the new Thames ward. The two Thames wards have nothing in common other than their name.

== Location ==
The ward lies in Caversham, a village and suburb that was once an independent town on the north bank of the River Thames opposite Reading. As an area, Caversham also includes the wards of Caversham Heights and Emmer Green, together with part of the cross-river Thames ward. Caversham ward does, however, include both Caversham's village centre and its church, St Peter's.

From the south-west in clockwise order, the ward is bounded by the River Thames, The Warren, The Mount, Kidmore Road, Oakley Road, and Rotherfield Way. It then takes a behind the houses route to the north of Balmore Drive and south of Surley Row to Peppard Road. From here, it runs between the back of the houses on Chiltern Road to the Henley Road, from where it follows the borough boundary to Paddock Road. It then follows Gosbrook Road to School Lane and Abbotsmeade Place back to the River Thames.

The ward is bordered by Caversham Heights, Emmer Green and Thames wards of Reading Borough Council, and by the civil parish of Eye and Dunsden in South Oxfordshire. The whole of the ward lies within the Reading Central parliamentary constituency.

== Profile ==
=== Demographics ===
As of 2024, Caversham ward had an area of 2.192 square kilometres (0.846 sq mi) and there were 11,317 people living there. Of these, 18.9% were under 15 and 15.8% were 65 and over; 81.6% classified themselves as White, 7.6% as Asian, and 3.7% as Black, Caribbean or African; 20.5% were born outside the UK.

The population lived in 4,672 households, of which 22.5% were in a flat, maisonette or apartment, and 77.4% were in a house or bungalow. Of the households, 30.5% were owned outright by the residents, 35.0% were owned subject to a mortgage, loan or shared ownership, 21.8% were privately rented and 12.7% were socially rented.

Of the population aged over 16, 65.6% were in employment, 3.4% were unemployed, and 31.0% were economically inactive. Of those in employment, 64.1% were in managerial, professional or technical occupations. A total of 50.6% of the population were educated to university degree level.

=== Environment ===
As of 2022, Caversham ward had a tree canopy cover of 18.8%, compared to figures of 17.7% for the Reading as a whole, and 16.5% for the United Kingdom. The principal open spaces in the ward are the public parks at Caversham Court, Balmore Walk and Westfield Road.

=== Facilities ===
The ward includes Caversham primary school, Queen Anne's School and Caversham preparatory school. Churches in the ward include St Peter's, St John the Baptist, and Our Lady and Saint Anne.

The village centre of Caversham, centred around Bridge Street, Church Road, St Martin's Precinct and Prospect Street, is in the ward, and includes a significant amount of retail space.

== Representation ==
As with all Reading wards, the ward elects three councillors to Reading Borough Council. Elections since 2004 are generally held by thirds, with elections in three years out of four. As of May 2026, the ward councillors are Jan Gavin, Jacopo Lanzoni and Matt Yeo, who are all members of the Labour party.
