= Abbey (Reading ward) =

Electoral ward in Berkshire, England

Coordinates: 51.458264°N 0.972501°W

- ward Reading Borough Council
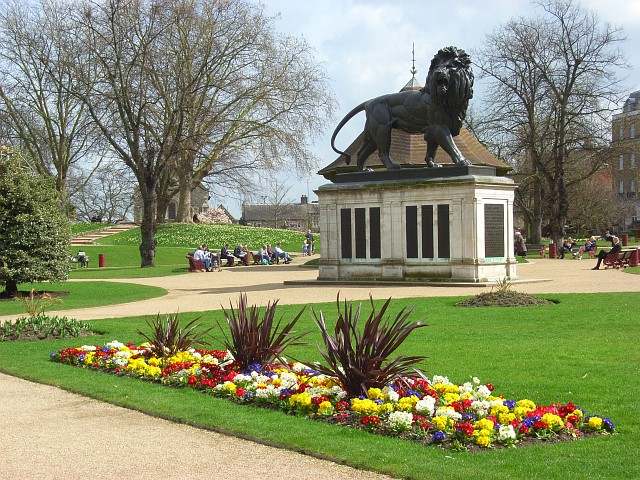
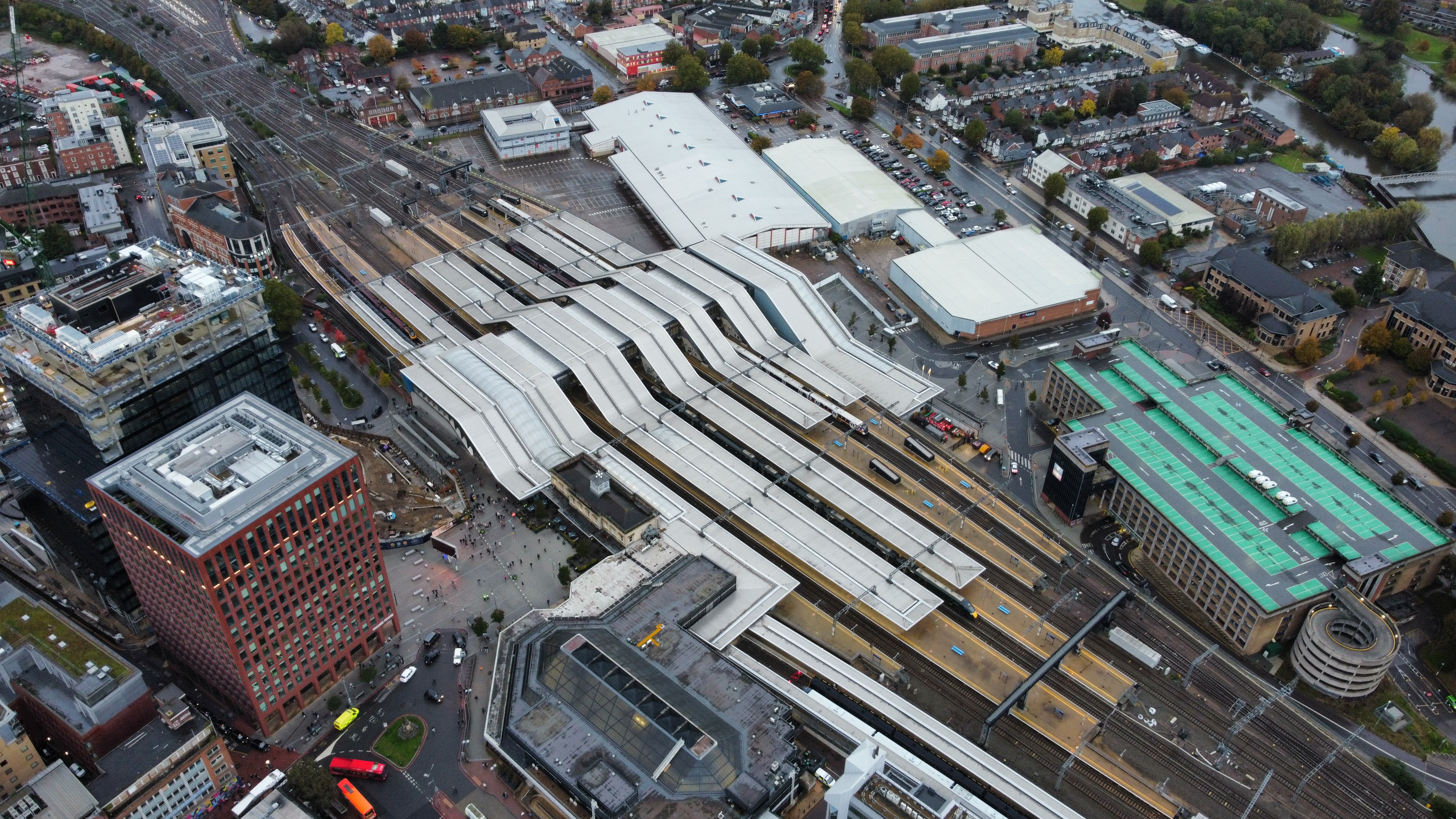
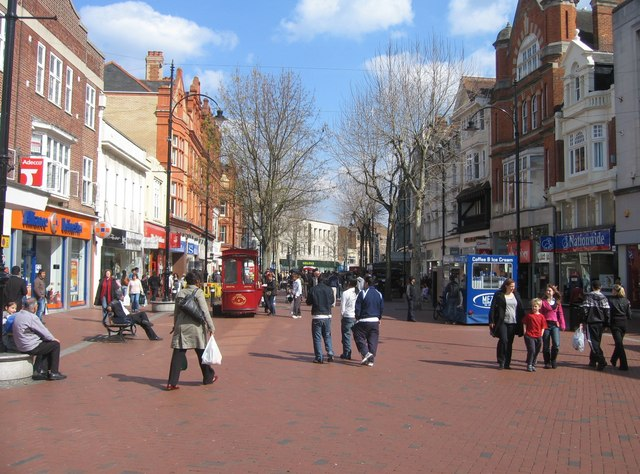
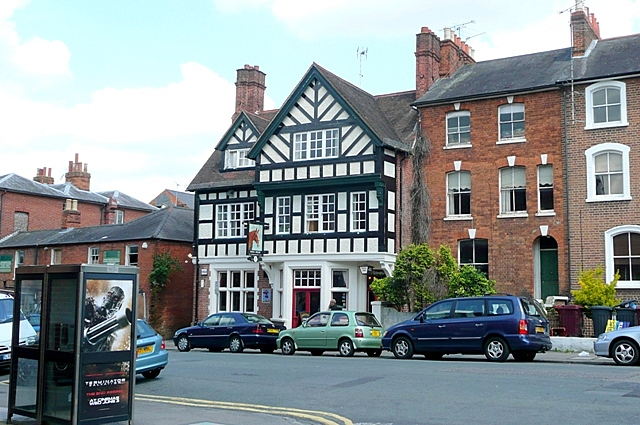
- Clockwise from top left: Forbury Gardens, railway station, the Nag's Head in Russell Street and Broad Street
- Population: 12,104

Current ward
- Councillor: Mohammed Ayub (Labour)
- Councillor: David Stevens (Labour)
- Councillor: Jacqueline Dominquez (Green)

Abbey is an electoral ward of the Borough of Reading, in the English county of Berkshire. The ruins of Reading Abbey lie within the boundaries of the ward, a fact from which it derives its name.

== Location ==
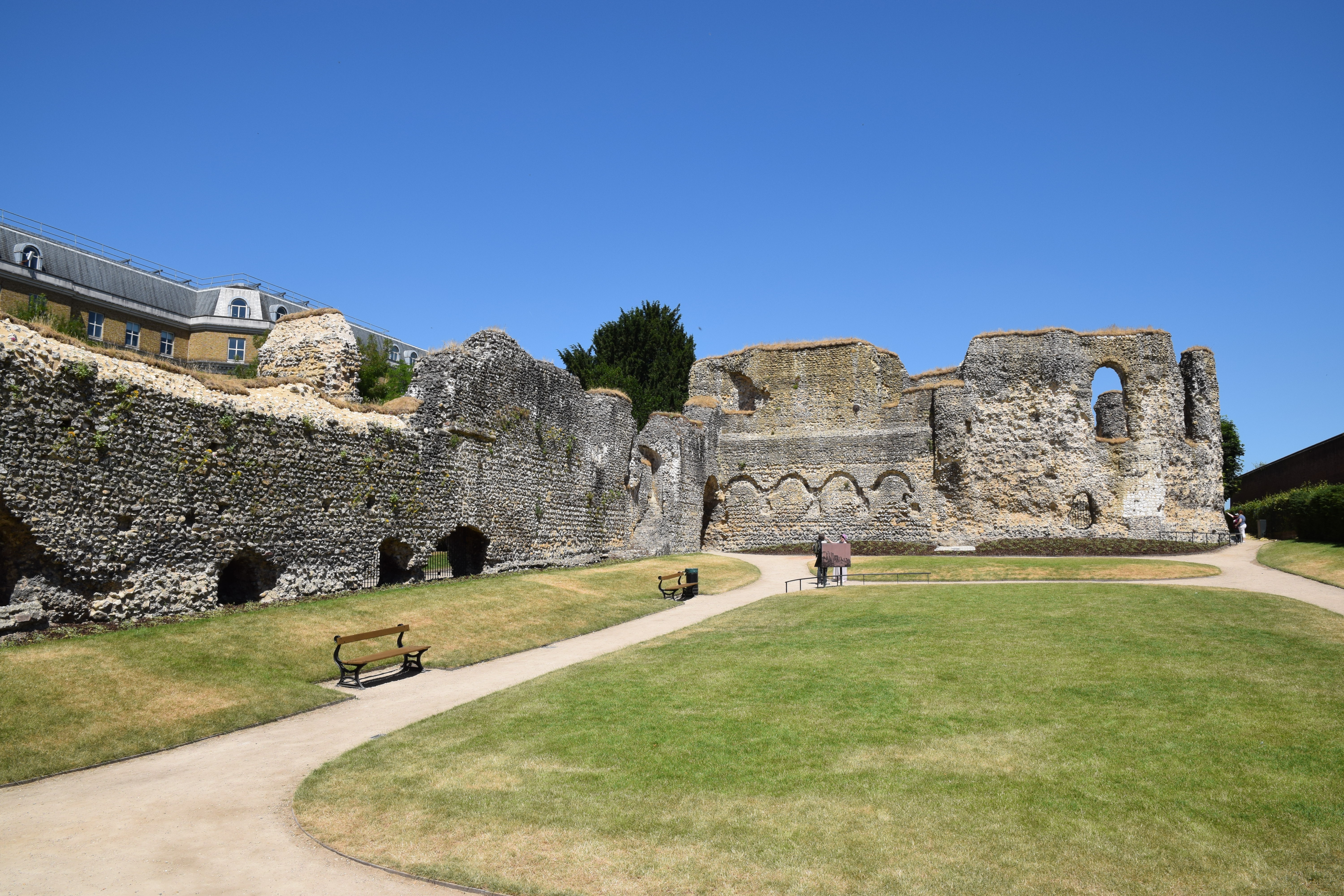
The ruins of Reading Abbey, from which the ward takes its name

Abbey ward includes the town centre of Reading, together with inner-city areas to the west of the centre on either side of Oxford Road as far as Reading West railway station.

From the north, in a clockwise direction, the ward boundary follows the railway through Reading railway station to the bridge over Vastern Road. From here it follows Forbury Road, King's Road, Queen's Road and the Inner Distribution Road to the Castle Street roundabout. From here it goes up Castle Hill and follows Tilehurst Road, Prospect Street and Oxford Road to Reading West station, from which it follows the railway back to Reading station.

In the same order as above, the ward is bordered by Thames, Redlands, Katesgrove, Coley and Battle wards. It lies entirely within the Reading Central parliamentary constituency.

== Profile ==
=== Demographics ===
As of 2024, Abbey ward had an area of 1.582 square kilometres (0.611 sq mi) and there were 12,104 people living there. Of these, 13.5% were under 15 and 4.8% were 65 and over; 52.9% classified themselves as White, 27.7% as Asian, and 8.8% as Black, Caribbean or African; 61.6% were born outside the UK.

The population lived in approximately 4,761 households, of which 79.6% were in a flat, maisonette or apartment, and 20.3% were in a house or bungalow. Of the households, 7.4% were owned outright by the residents, 14.78% were owned subject to a mortgage, loan or shared ownership, 67.1% were privately rented and 10.9% were socially rented.

Of the population aged over 16, 70.2% were in employment, 5.2% were unemployed, and 24.5% were economically inactive. Of those in employment, 56.1% were in managerial, professional or technical occupations. A total of 53.2% of the population were educated to university degree level.

=== Environment ===
As of 2022, Abbey ward had a tree canopy cover of 5.5%, compared to figures of 17.7% for the Reading as a whole, and 16.5% for the United Kingdom. The most significant open spaces are the Forbury Gardens and the adjacent ruins of Reading Abbey, complemented by the churchyards of Reading Minster and St Laurence's Church.

=== Facilities ===
The ward includes Civitas Academy and Oxford Road Community primary schools, but no secondary schools. It also includes Reading Minster and Greyfriars, Holy Trinity, St Giles', St James's, St Laurence's and St Mary's (Castle Street) churches. The Town Hall, including its concert hall and the Museum of Reading, the Civic Offices and Library, and the Hexagon Theatre, are all in the ward.

As might be expected from its town centre location, the ward includes a large amount of retail space, including the pedestrianised Broad Street, and the Oracle and Broad Street Mall shopping centres. Reading railway station lies on the northern boundary, and most of Reading's bus routes either start from or pass through the ward.

== Representation ==
As with all Reading wards, the ward elects three councillors to Reading Borough Council. Elections since 2004 are generally held by thirds, with elections in three years out of four. The ward councillors are currently Mohammed Ayub and David Stevens, both of whom are members of the Labour party, and Jacqueline Dominquez, who is a member of the Green party.

Tony Page, one of Reading's most prominent local politicians, continuously represented Abbey Ward and its predecessors from 1973 until his retirement in 2024.
