= Crown closure =

Measure of forest canopy coverage

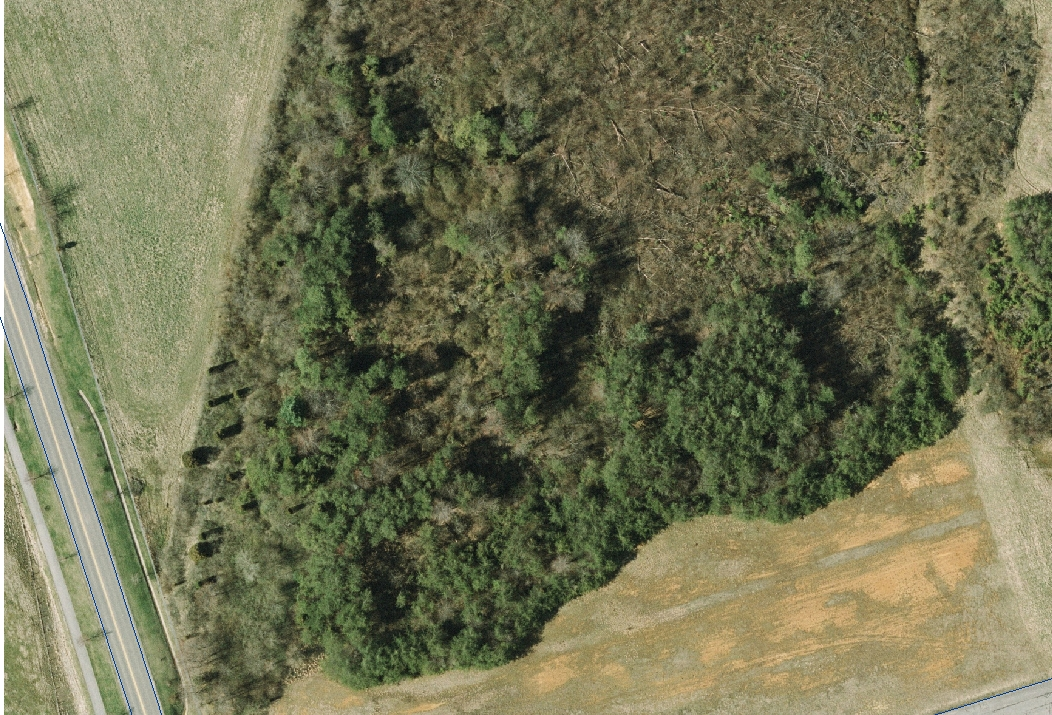
Aerial Overview of Crown Closure

In forestry, crown closure is a measure of forest canopy coverage. Crown closure and crown cover are two slightly different measures of the forest canopy and that determine the amount of light able to penetrate to the forest floor.

Crown closure, also known as canopy closure, is an integrated measure of the canopy "over a segment of the sky hemisphere above one point on the ground".

Crown cover is the proportion of a stand covered by the crowns of live trees.

A forest stand can have a crown cover of 100% and a crown closure less than 100%. Typical stands with 100% cover but low closure are coffee agroforestry stands, where overlapping parasol-shaped crowns ensure complete cover but still allow light to penetrate at an oblique angle to the forest floor.

== Basic concepts ==
Crown closure helps predict volume, stand density, crown width, and crown competition factor. Crown closure is often determined using aerial photographs because ground evaluations become difficult to obtain. Stands are usually placed in to different classes (1-6) after viewing the aerial photographs.

1. Very Sparse 1–9%
2. Sparse 10–29%
3. Low 30–49%
4. Medium 50–69%
5. Dense 70–84%
6. Very Dense 85–100%

Although sometimes referred to as canopy cover and canopy closure, crown closure is different from these two concepts. Canopy cover represents the aggregate of all vertically projected tree crowns onto the ground surface, while canopy closure represents the amount of the sky obscured by the canopy from a certain point on the ground.

== Ground measurement ==
Each tree’s measurements are used to calculate the area projected by the crown onto the ground. Summing the crown areas for all trees measured on a fixed plot area and dividing by the ground area will give the crown closure. The "moosehorn" crown closure estimator is a device for measuring crown closure from the ground. Other methods for estimating crown closure include the use of line-intercept, spherical densiometer, and hemispherical photography. Exact cover measurements should be made in vertical direction, or the cover percent will be overestimated.

== Aerial measurement ==
Aerial photographs made at scales of 1:15,000 or larger can be used to determine crown closure estimates, usually done by ocular interpretation, by grouping stands into percent classes. Low density stands make for an easy ocular estimation, but as the stand density increases the ocular estimates become more difficult to obtain. In dense stands, overestimates or underestimates of crown closure can be made and predicting value of stand volume becomes more reduced.

== See also ==
- Crown shyness
- Tree crown measurement
