= 1999 Reading Borough Council election =

← 1997	6 May 1999	2000 →

16 seats of 45 on council 23 seats needed for a majority
	First party	Second party	Third party
	Lab	LD	Con
Leader	David Sutton	Ian Fenwick	Fred Pugh
Party	Labour	Liberal Democrats	Conservative
Seats before	35	6	3
Seats after	36	6	3
Seat change	▲1	Steady	Steady
Popular vote	14,094	6,532	7,945
Percentage	48.7%	22.5%	27.4%
Swing	▲4.2%	▼1.9%	▼2.9%
	Fourth party
	Ind
Party	Independent
Seats before	1
Seats after	0
Seat change	▼1

The 1999 Reading Borough Council election was held on 6 May 1999, at the same time as other local elections across Britain. Sixteen of the 45 seats on Reading Borough Council were up for election, being the usual third of the council (15 seats) plus a by-election in Abbey ward, where Labour's Jane Griffiths had resigned her seat on the council.

Labour gained one seat in Abbey ward which had been held by Mohammad Iqbal, who had been elected as a Labour councillor in 1997 but expelled from the party later that year. He had continued to hold his council seat since then as an independent councillor, but did not stand for re-election in 1999. Apart from that change, no other seats changed party in 1999.

== Results summary ==
Reading Borough Council Election, 1999
Party	Seats	Gains	Losses	Net gain/loss	Seats %	Votes %	Votes	+/−
Labour	13	1	0	+1	81.3	48.7	14,094	+4.2
Conservative	1	0	0	0	6.3	27.4	7,945	-2.9
Liberal Democrats	2	0	0	0	12.5	22.5	6,532	-1.9
Green	0				0.0	1.4	397	+0.6

=== Ward results ===
The results in each ward were as follows:

Abbey Ward
Party	Candidate	Votes	%	±%
Labour	Jim Durkin	932	61.1	
Conservative	Richard Willis	387	25.6	
Liberal Democrats	John Wood	201	13.3	
Turnout		1,511		
Labour gain from Independent		Swing		

Abbey Ward (by-election)
Party	Candidate	Votes	%	±%
Labour	June Orton	987	65.6	
Conservative	Paul Swaddle	325	21.6	
Liberal Democrats	Tony Warrell	192	12.8	
Turnout		1,504		
Labour hold		Swing		

Battle Ward
Party	Candidate	Votes	%	±%
Labour	Tony Jones	925	67.6	
Conservative	Dharam Ahuja	309	22.6	
Liberal Democrats	Thomas Cook	135	9.9	
Turnout		1,369		
Labour hold		Swing		

Caversham Ward
Party	Candidate	Votes	%	±%
Labour	Kathryn Peak	1,236	45.2	
Conservative	Robert Wilson	1,154	42.2	
Liberal Democrats	Robin Bentham	342	12.5	
Turnout		2,732		
Labour hold		Swing		

Church Ward
Party	Candidate	Votes	%	±%
Labour	Wilf Wild	659	59.0	
Conservative	Philip Gibbs	255	22.8	
Liberal Democrats	Elizabeth Heydeman	146	13.1	
Green	Richard Bradbury	57	5.1	
Turnout		1,117		
Labour hold		Swing		

Katesgrove Ward
Party	Candidate	Votes	%	±%
Labour	Trish Thomas	764	67.5	
Conservative	Simon O'Sullivan	222	19.6	
Liberal Democrats	Andrew Colman	146	12.9	
Turnout		1,132		
Labour hold		Swing		

Kentwood Ward
Party	Candidate	Votes	%	±%
Labour	Sandy Scaife	952	44.9	
Conservative	Ruth Bennett	689	32.5	
Liberal Democrats	Dennis Morgan	432	20.4	
Green	John Gooch	48	2.3	
Turnout		2,121		
Labour hold		Swing		

Minster Ward
Party	Candidate	Votes	%	±%
Labour	Stuart White	1,225	58.0	
Conservative	Emma Warman	683	32.4	
Liberal Democrats	Christopher Harris	203	9.6	
Turnout		2,111		
Labour hold		Swing		

Norcot Ward
Party	Candidate	Votes	%	±%
Labour	Peter Jones	971	67.8	
Conservative	Alexandra Mowczan	249	17.4	
Liberal Democrats	Martin Scott	213	14.9	
Turnout		1,433		
Labour hold		Swing		

Park Ward
Party	Candidate	Votes	%	±%
Labour	Christine Borgars	1,063	61.5	
Conservative	Vinod Sharma	302	17.5	
Liberal Democrats	George Hamish Hew Preston Hamish Preston	244	14.1	
Green	Mary Westley	119	6.9	
Turnout		1,728		
Labour hold		Swing		

Peppard Ward
Party	Candidate	Votes	%	±%
Liberal Democrats	Bob Green	1,608	61.6	
Conservative	Edward Brazil	746	28.6	
Labour	Keith Uden	257	9.8	
Turnout		2,611		
Liberal Democrats hold		Swing		

Redlands Ward
Party	Candidate	Votes	%	±%
Labour	Liz Winfield-Chislett	900	49.2	
Liberal Democrats	Martin Reilly	450	24.6	
Conservative	Abdul Loyes	345	18.9	
Green	Elisabeth Brelstaff	133	7.3	
Turnout		1,828		
Labour hold		Swing		

Southcote Ward
Party	Candidate	Votes	%	±%
Labour	Askar Sheibani	1,177	67.8	
Conservative	Charlotte Hawkins	413	23.8	
Liberal Democrats	Sheila Myra Morley Myra Morley	147	8.5	
Turnout		1,737		
Labour hold		Swing		

Thames Ward
Party	Candidate	Votes	%	±%
Conservative	Jeanette Skeats	1,320	48.1	
Liberal Democrats	Annette Hendry	939	34.2	
Labour	Christine Grieve	486	17.7	
Turnout		2,745		
Conservative hold		Swing		

Tilehurst Ward
Party	Candidate	Votes	%	±%
Liberal Democrats	Dick Ferriday	1,030	47.9	
Labour	Catherine Wilton	738	34.3	
Conservative	Iona Morris	344	16.0	
Green	Judith Green	40	1.9	
Turnout		2,152		
Liberal Democrats hold		Swing		

Whitley Ward
Party	Candidate	Votes	%	±%
Labour	Lawrence Silverman	831	73.1	
Conservative	Paul Atkinson	202	17.8	
Liberal Democrats	Max Thomas Heydeman Tom Heydeman	104	9.1	
Turnout		1,137		
Labour hold		Swing		
