= 2002 Reading Borough Council election =

← 2001	2 May 2002	2003 →

16 seats of 45 on council 23 seats needed for a majority
	First party	Second party	Third party
	Lab	LD	Con
Leader	David Sutton	Bob Green	Fred Pugh
Party	Labour	Liberal Democrats	Conservative
Seats before	36	6	3
Seats after	36	6	3
Seat change	Steady	Steady	Steady
Popular vote	13,684	8,055	8,317
Percentage	44.2%	26.0%	26.9%
Swing	▼2.5%	▲1.5%	Steady

The 2002 Reading Borough Council election was held on 2 May 2002, at the same time as other local elections across England. Sixteen of the 45 seats on Reading Borough Council were up for election, being the usual third of the council (15 seats) plus a by-election in Redlands ward, where Labour councillor Rajinder Sohpal had resigned. No seats changed party at the election, and the council therefore continued to have a Labour majority, with David Sutton continuing as leader of the party and the council.

== Results summary ==
Reading Borough Council Election, 2002
Party	Seats	Gains	Losses	Net gain/loss	Seats %	Votes %	Votes	+/−
Labour	13	0	0	0	81.3	44.2	13,684	-2.5
Conservative	1	0	0	0	6.3	26.9	8,317	0.0
Liberal Democrats	2	0	0	0	12.5	26.0	8,055	+1.5
Green	0				0.0	2.2	680	+0.4
Independent	0				0.0	0.7	208	

=== Ward results ===
The results in each ward were as follows:

Abbey Ward
Party	Candidate	Votes	%	±%
Labour	Betty Tickner	965	51.3	−6.0
Conservative	Lee Clarke	401	21.3	−0.3
Liberal Democrats	John Wood	306	16.3	−4.7
Independent	Peter Burt	208	11.1	n/a
Turnout		1,880		
Labour hold		Swing	-2.85	

Battle Ward
Party	Candidate	Votes	%	±%
Labour	Anthony Jones	1,044	67.7	+5.0
Conservative	Iona Morris	266	17.2	−2.4
Liberal Democrats	James Martin	233	15.1	−2.6
Turnout		1,543		
Labour hold		Swing	+3.7	

Caversham Ward
Party	Candidate	Votes	%	±%
Labour	Mary Waite	1,300	43.6	−3.0
Conservative	Robert Wilson	1,210	40.6	+7.4
Liberal Democrats	Diane Elliss	473	15.9	−4.5
Turnout		2,983		
Labour hold		Swing	-5.2	

Church Ward
Party	Candidate	Votes	%	±%
Labour	Mohammed Janjua	745	48.8	−6.1
Conservative	Howard Shaw	462	30.3	+2.9
Liberal Democrats	Anthony Warrell	320	21.0	+8.2
Turnout		1,527		
Labour hold		Swing	-4.5	

Katesgrove Ward
Party	Candidate	Votes	%	±%
Labour	Patricia Thomas	695	56.0	+4.7
Conservative	Shirley Mills	233	18.8	−2.2
Liberal Democrats	Patricia Hardy	207	16.7	−10.9
Green	Naomi Emmerson	105	8.5	
Turnout		1,240		
Labour hold		Swing	+3.45	

Kentwood Ward
Party	Candidate	Votes	%	±%
Labour	Sandy Scaife	1,065	47.8	+1.3
Conservative	Thomas Steele	691	31.0	−0.8
Liberal Democrats	Richard Duveen	471	21.1	−0.5
Turnout		2,227		
Labour hold		Swing	+1.05	

Minster Ward
Party	Candidate	Votes	%	±%
Labour	Paul Gittings	1,124	49.6	+0.4
Conservative	Michael Wade	698	30.8	+1.4
Liberal Democrats	Nicola Lawson	325	14.3	−2.1
Green	Hugh Swann	119	5.3	+0.3
Turnout		2,266		
Labour hold		Swing	-0.5	

Norcot Ward
Party	Candidate	Votes	%	±%
Labour	Peter Jones	1,184	64.8	−0.2
Conservative	Alexandra Mowczan	341	18.7	−1.8
Liberal Democrats	Thomas Cook	302	16.5	+2.0
Turnout		1,827		
Labour hold		Swing	+0.8	

Park Ward
Party	Candidate	Votes	%	±%
Labour	Christine Borgars	1,089	55.9	+4.4
Liberal Democrats	Judith Fry	411	21.1	−1.1
Conservative	Vinod Sharma	252	12.9	−4.4
Green	James Towell	197	10.1	+1.2
Turnout		1,949		
Labour hold		Swing	+2.75	

Peppard Ward
Party	Candidate	Votes	%	±%
Liberal Democrats	Robert Green (Bob Green)	1,611	58.2	+7.7
Conservative	Christopher Morton	875	31.6	−1.7
Labour	David O'Meara	282	10.2	−5.9
Turnout		2,768		
Liberal Democrats hold		Swing	+4.7	

Redlands Ward
Party	Candidate	Votes	%	±%
Labour	Elizabeth Winfield-Chislett	902	42.7	+4.7
Liberal Democrats	Christopher Harris	741	35.1	−0.6
Conservative	Abdul Loyes	273	12.9	−6.5
Green	Mary Westley	197	9.3	+2.4
Turnout		2,113		
Labour hold		Swing	+2.65	

Redlands Ward (by-election)
Party	Candidate	Votes	%	±%
Labour	Riaz Chaudhri	999	47.2	
Liberal Democrats	Richard Hall	818	14.2	
Conservative	Andrew Kitching	301	14.2	
Turnout		2,118		
Labour hold		Swing		

Southcote Ward
Party	Candidate	Votes	%	±%
Labour	Christopher Swaine	1,279	65.6	+3.7
Conservative	Margaret Gibbons	477	24.4	−1.8
Liberal Democrats	Sheila Myra Morley (Myra Morley)	195	10.0	−1.9
Turnout		1,951		
Labour hold		Swing	+2.75	

Thames Ward
Party	Candidate	Votes	%	±%
Conservative	Jeanette Skeats	1,442	46.7	+2.9
Liberal Democrats	Sheila Summers	1,273	41.2	+10.5
Labour	Thomas Crisp	372	12.1	−13.4
Turnout		3,087		
Conservative hold		Swing	-3.8	

Tilehurst Ward
Party	Candidate	Votes	%	±%
Liberal Democrats	Peter Weston	1,065	46.9	+8.0
Labour	Raymond Richens	743	32.7	−1.2
Conservative	Una Kidd	401	17.7	−6.9
Green	Jacob Sanders	62	2.7	0.0
Turnout		2,271		
Liberal Democrats hold		Swing	+4.6	

Whitley Ward
Party	Candidate	Votes	%	±%
Labour	Lawrence Silverman	895	68.2	+0.7
Conservative	Barrie Cummings	295	22.5	−0.4
Liberal Democrats	Max Thomas Heydeman (Tom Heydeman)	122	9.3	−0.3
Turnout		1,312		
Labour hold		Swing	+0.55	
