= 1992 Reading Borough Council election =

← 1991	7 May 1992	1994 →

15 seats of 45 on council 23 seats needed for a majority
	First party	Second party	Third party
	Lab	Con	LD
Leader	Mike Orton	Pauline Palmer	Jim Day
Party	Labour	Conservative	Liberal Democrats
Seats before	29	10	4
Seats after	29	11	4
Seat change	Steady	▲1	Steady
Popular vote	13,532	14,919	5,605
Percentage	37.1%	40.9%	15.4%
Swing	▼2.9%	▲2.6%	▼0.5%
	Fourth party
	Ind
Party	Independent
Seats before	2
Seats after	1
Seat change	▼1
Popular vote	1,168
Percentage	3.2%
Swing	N/A

The 1992 Reading Borough Council election was held on 7 May 1992, at the same time as other local elections across England and Scotland, and a month after the general election. One third of Reading Borough Council's 45 seats were up for election.

The only seat which changed parties was in Thames Ward, where the official Conservative candidate won the seat back from the independent "Thames Conservative" candidate, Pam Fuad, who had been elected in 1988 as a Conservative but had broken away from the group with her husband, councillor Hamza Fuad, to form the Thames Conservatives in 1990.

Turnout was reported to be 36%.

== Results ==
Reading Borough Council election, 1992
Party	Seats	Gains	Losses	Net gain/loss	Seats %	Votes %	Votes	+/−
Labour	9	0	0	0	60.0	37.1	13,532	-2.9
Conservative	5	1	0	+1	33.3	40.9	14,919	+2.6
Liberal Democrats	1	0	0	0	6.7	15.4	5,605	-0.5
Green	0				0.0	3.5	1,263	-2.4
Independent	0	0	1	-1	0.0	3.2	1,168	N/A

=== Ward results ===
The results in each ward were as follows (candidates with an asterisk* were the previous incumbent standing for re-election):

Abbey Ward
Party	Candidate	Votes	%	±%
Labour	Jane Griffiths*	1,053	53.9	−2.0
Conservative	Mark Boyle	640	32.8	+6.6
Liberal Democrats	Barry Richardson	176	9.0	−4.0
Green	David Wright	83	4.3	−0.7
Turnout		1,952		
Labour hold		Swing	-4.3	

Battle Ward
Party	Candidate	Votes	%	±%
Labour	Andrew Tattersall	864	53.7	−6.1
Conservative	Jan De-Volle Harding	523	32.5	+2.4
Liberal Democrats	Thomas Cook	149	9.3	n/a
Green	Howard Darby	73	4.5	−5.6
Turnout		1,609		
Labour hold		Swing	-4.25	

Caversham Ward
Party	Candidate	Votes	%	±%
Conservative	Pauline Palmer*	2,044	66.6	+17.3
Labour	Ian Howarth	712	23.2	−8.9
Liberal Democrats	Ann Stagg	241	7.9	−5.8
Green	Robert McCubbin	70	2.3	−2.5
Turnout		3,067		
Conservative hold		Swing	+13.1	

Church Ward
Party	Candidate	Votes	%	±%
Labour	Maureen Lockey*	883	55.7	+0.2
Liberal Democrats	Jonathan Everitt	499	31.5	n/a
Green	Richard Bradbury	202	12.8	+3.1
Turnout		1,584		
Labour hold		Swing	-15.65	

The Conservatives had planned to field a candidate in Church Ward, but the person withdrew just ahead of the deadline for nominations.

Katesgrove Ward
Party	Candidate	Votes	%	±%
Labour	David Sutton*	852	49.7	−4.5
Conservative	Shirley Mills	569	33.2	+0.8
Liberal Democrats	Mark Gray	229	13.4	n/a
Green	Christine Critchfield	65	3.8	−9.7
Turnout		1,715		
Labour hold		Swing	-2.65	

Kentwood Ward
Party	Candidate	Votes	%	±%
Conservative	John Oliver	1,273	46.1	+6.5
Liberal Democrats	Michael Bonney (Mike Bonney)	877	31.8	−0.2
Labour	Mohammad Iqbal	545	19.7	−6.3
Green	John Gibson	67	2.4	0.0
Turnout		2,762		
Conservative hold		Swing	+3.35	

Minster Ward
Party	Candidate	Votes	%	±%
Conservative	Anthony Markham (Tony Markham)	1,480	52.4	+5.5
Labour	Daniel McNamara (Danny McNamara)	1,055	37.3	−8.5
Liberal Democrats	Mark Boyne	266	9.4	n/a
Green	Elizabeth Maria Darby (Maria Darby)	26	0.9	−6.4
Turnout		2,827		
Conservative hold		Swing	+7.0	

Norcot Ward
Party	Candidate	Votes	%	±%
Labour	Mandy Winters	1,283	56.9	−1.0
Conservative	William Henderson	845	37.5	+16.0
Green	David Chaplin	128	5.7	+1.8
Turnout		2,256		
Labour hold		Swing	-8.5	

Park Ward
Party	Candidate	Votes	%	±%
Labour	Martin Salter*	1,420	58.8	+2.4
Conservative	Simon Robinson	715	29.6	+6.0
Liberal Democrats	Susan Doughty	192	8.0	−4.9
Green	Philip Unsworth	86	3.6	−3.5
Turnout		2,413		
Labour hold		Swing	-1.8	

Peppard Ward
Party	Candidate	Votes	%	±%
Conservative	Mary Irwin*	1,960	63.8	+9.1
Liberal Democrats	Ian Fenwick	683	22.2	−6.4
Labour	Charles Croal	362	11.8	−1.5
Green	Andrew McPhee	66	2.1	−1.2
Turnout		3,071		
Conservative hold		Swing	+7.75	

Redlands Ward
Party	Candidate	Votes	%	±%
Labour	Robert Sulley	1,295	48.2	+3.1
Conservative	Derek Ching	973	36.2	+0.1
Liberal Democrats	Philippa Donald	323	12.0	−0.9
Green	Elisabeth Brelstaff	98	3.6	−2.2
Turnout		2,689		
Labour hold		Swing	+1.5	

Southcote Ward
Party	Candidate	Votes	%	±%
Labour	Roberta Richardson* (Bobbie Richardson)	1,539	56.0	+4.4
Conservative	Simon Beckingham	1,115	40.6	−1.9
Green	Tim Astin	95	3.5	−2.5
Turnout		2,749		
Labour hold		Swing	+3.15	

Thames Ward
Party	Candidate	Votes	%	±%
Conservative	Robert Wilson	1,462	41.8	−12.8
Independent	Pamela Fuad*	1,168	33.4	n/a
Liberal Democrats	John Adams	442	12.7	−14.3
Labour	Christine Borgars	336	9.6	−3.3
Green	Anne McCubbin	86	2.5	−3.0
Turnout		3,494		
Conservative gain from Independent		Swing	n/a	

Tilehurst Ward
Party	Candidate	Votes	%	±%
Liberal Democrats	Ronald James Day* (Jim Day)	1,528	59.1	+2.5
Conservative	David Henderson	706	27.3	+1.4
Labour	Kevin Durham	299	11.6	−3.2
Green	Judith Green	52	2.0	−0.6
Turnout		2,585		
Liberal Democrats hold		Swing	+0.55	

Whitley Ward
Party	Candidate	Votes	%	±%
Labour	John Cook*	1,034	60.3	−1.1
Conservative	Barrie Cummings	614	35.8	+4.6
Green	Jacqueline Hearn	66	3.9	−3.5
Turnout		1,714		
Labour hold		Swing	-2.85	

The Liberal Democrats had planned to field a candidate in Whitley Ward, but an irregularity on his nomination papers meant that he was disqualified.

== By-elections 1992–1994 ==
Park by-election, 6 May 1993
Party	Candidate	Votes	%	±%
Labour	Christine Borgars	1,571	66.9	+8.1
Conservative	Amir Kharkowa	570	24.3	−5.4
Green	Philip Unsworth	207	8.8	+5.3
Majority		1,001	42.6	
Turnout		2,348		
Labour hold		Swing	+6.75	

The Park ward by-election in 1993 was triggered by the resignation of Labour councillor Gillian Parker.
