= 2004 Reading Borough Council election =

← 2003	10 June 2004	2006 →

46 seats (whole council) 24 seats needed for a majority
	First party	Second party	Third party
	Lab	Con	LD
Leader	David Sutton	Fred Pugh	Bob Green
Party	Labour	Conservative	Liberal Democrats
Seats before	35	4	6
Seats after	35	6	5
Seat change	Steady	▲2	▼1
Popular vote	39,510	32,952	26,158
Percentage	38.4%	32.0%	25.4%
Swing	▼0.6%	▲3.2%	▼1.2%
- Results of the 2004 Reading Borough Council election

The 2004 Reading Borough Council election was held on 10 June 2004, at the same time as other local elections across England and Wales and the European elections. Following boundary changes the number of seats on Reading Borough Council had been increased from 45 to 46 with the creation of a new single-member ward called Mapledurham and changes to the boundaries of several existing wards. All 46 seats on the council were up for election. Labour, led by David Sutton, retained its 35 seats on the council and therefore kept its majority. The Conservatives, led by Fred Pugh, gained one seat at the election from the Liberal Democrats and won the new Mapledurham seat, meaning they overtook the Liberal Democrats to become the second largest party on the council with six seats. The Liberal Democrats, led by Bob Green, were left with five seats.

== Results summary ==
Reading Borough Council Election, 2004
Party	Seats	Gains	Losses	Net gain/loss	Seats %	Votes %	Votes	+/−
Labour	35	0	0	0	76.1	38.4	39,510	-0.6
Conservative	6	2	0	+2	13.0	31.4	32,952	+3.2
Liberal Democrats	5	0	1	-1	10.9	25.4	26,158	-1.2
Green	0				0.0	3.0	3,055	+0.9
UKIP	0				0.0	0.6	625	
Independent	0				0.0	0.5	487	
Health and Community Issues Party	0				0.0	0.2	230	

=== Ward results ===
The results in each ward were as follows:

Abbey Ward
Party	Candidate	Votes	%	±%
Labour	Antony Page	841		
Labour	June Orton	839		
Labour	Betty Tickner	725		
Liberal Democrats	Margaret Jordan	452		
Conservative	Humphry Crum-Ewing	417		
Conservative	Ashleigh Skeats	406		
Liberal Democrats	David Langshaw	359		
Conservative	Adam Woolhouse	339		
Green	Mark Walker	333		
Liberal Democrats	John Wood	329		
Turnout		5,040	26.1	
Labour hold		Swing		
Labour hold		Swing		
Labour hold		Swing		

Battle Ward
Party	Candidate	Votes	%	±%
Labour	Tom Crisp	987		
Labour	Chris Maskell	950		
Labour	Tony Jones	939		
Liberal Democrats	James Martin	507		
Conservative	Victoria Evans	474		
Liberal Democrats	Simon Heywood	464		
Liberal Democrats	Adam Canning	454		
Conservative	Patrick Moren	426		
Conservative	Ashley Robinson	411		
Turnout		5,612	29.0	
Labour hold		Swing		
Labour hold		Swing		
Labour hold		Swing		

Caversham Ward
Party	Candidate	Votes	%	±%
Labour	Stephen Waite	1,033		
Labour	Susan Stainthorp	1,025		
Conservative	Andrew Cumpsty	1,033		
Conservative	Timothy Harris	902		
Labour	Shirley Merriott	866		
Conservative	Dharam Ahuja	837		
Liberal Democrats	Diane Elliss	554		
Liberal Democrats	Margaret Martin	501		
Liberal Democrats	Robin Bentham	460		
Green	Harriet Marshall	431		
Turnout		7,559	38.4	
Labour hold		Swing		
Labour hold		Swing		
Conservative hold		Swing		

Church Ward
Party	Candidate	Votes	%	±%
Labour	Christopher Goodall	821		
Labour	Christine Grieve	813		
Labour	Mohammed Azam Janjua	803		
Conservative	Paul Noades	672		
Conservative	Lee Clark	664		
Conservative	Howard Shaw	606		
Liberal Democrats	Jane Sharp	423		
Green	David Pledger	403		
Liberal Democrats	Guy Penman	402		
Turnout		5,607	28.8	
Labour hold		Swing		
Labour hold		Swing		
Labour hold		Swing		

Katesgrove Ward
Party	Candidate	Votes	%	±%
Labour	David Sutton	742		
Labour	Gul Muwaz Khan	657		
Labour	Richard Stainthorp	633		
Liberal Democrats	Christopher Jones	441		
Liberal Democrats	Warren Swaine	396		
Green	Rachel Mills	324		
Liberal Democrats	Nina Webb	311		
Conservative	Thomas Stanway	291		
Conservative	Alan Skeats	289		
Independent	Adeyinka Oyekan	289		
Conservative	Anthony Devenish	272		
Independent	David Boobier	198		
Turnout		4,843	27.6	
Labour hold		Swing		
Labour hold		Swing		
Labour hold		Swing		

Kentwood Ward
Party	Candidate	Votes	%	±%
Labour	Victoria Lloyd	1,000		
Labour	Richard McKenzie	943		
Labour	Andrea Collins	922		
Conservative	Thomas Steele	917		
Conservative	Sandra Bowler	912		
Conservative	Jennifer Rynn	907		
Liberal Democrats	Richard Duveen	822		
Liberal Democrats	Graham Parry	768		
Liberal Democrats	Lee Glendon	679		
Turnout		7,870	39.9	
Labour hold		Swing		
Labour hold		Swing		
Labour hold		Swing		

Mapledurham Ward
Party	Candidate	Votes	%	±%
Conservative	Fred Pugh	832	64.2	
Liberal Democrats	Jill Green	314	24.2	
Labour	Peter Winfield-Chislett	150	11.6	
Turnout		1,296	54	
Conservative win (new seat)				

Minster Ward
Party	Candidate	Votes	%	±%
Labour	Catherine Wilton	1,113		
Labour	Paul Gittings	1,084		
Labour	Dave Dymond	1,056		
Conservative	Henry Willsher	956		
Conservative	Michael Wade	900		
Conservative	Anthony Markham	893		
Liberal Democrats	Rosamund Otto	522		
Liberal Democrats	Mark Summers	496		
Turnout		7,020	36.9	
Labour hold		Swing		
Labour hold		Swing		
Labour hold		Swing		

Norcot Ward
Party	Candidate	Votes	%	±%
Labour	Josephine Lovelock	1,279		
Labour	Graeme Hoskin	1,244		
Labour	Peter Jones	1,140		
Conservative	Ashley Black	585		
Conservative	Alexandra Mowczan	539		
Conservative	Peter Sprules	510		
Liberal Democrats	Thomas Cook	459		
Liberal Democrats	Evelyn Bentham	453		
Turnout		6,209	32.7	
Labour hold		Swing		
Labour hold		Swing		
Labour hold		Swing		

Park Ward
Party	Candidate	Votes	%	±%
Labour	Jon Hartley	1,189		
Labour	John Howarth	1,041		
Labour	Christine Borgars	1,033		
Liberal Democrats	James Spackman	732		
Liberal Democrats	Richard Hall	689		
Liberal Democrats	John Summers	672		
Green	Hugh Swann	417		
Green	Robert White	410		
Conservative	Martyn Washbourne	353		
Conservative	Jean Pugh	343		
Conservative	James Barraclough	331		
Green	Adrian Windisch	235		
UKIP	Sylvia Chumbley	148		
Turnout		7,593	36.1	
Labour hold		Swing		
Labour hold		Swing		
Labour hold		Swing		

Peppard Ward
Party	Candidate	Votes	%	±%
Liberal Democrats	Robert Green	1,566		
Liberal Democrats	Annette Hendry	1,504		
Conservative	Mark Ralph	1,401		
Liberal Democrats	Christopher Brown	1,330		
Conservative	John Oliver	1,272		
Conservative	Simon Blazley	1,240		
Labour	Helen Hathaway	371		
Labour	Keith Uden	298		
Labour	Adam Wood	292		
Turnout		9,274	45.6	
Liberal Democrats hold		Swing		
Liberal Democrats hold		Swing		
Conservative gain from Liberal Democrats		Swing		

Redlands Ward
Party	Candidate	Votes	%	±%
Labour	Riaz Chaudhri	1,091		
Labour	Peter Kayes	978		
Labour	Gul Faraz Khan	918		
Liberal Democrats	Nicholas Wright	632		
Liberal Democrats	Janek Mikulin	595		
Liberal Democrats	Ali Ashgar	514		
Green	Mary Westley	502		
Conservative	Alison Stevens	455		
Conservative	Carole Haskell	454		
Conservative	Augustine Aluko	377		
Turnout		6,516	33	
Labour hold		Swing		
Labour hold		Swing		
Labour hold		Swing		

Southcote Ward
Party	Candidate	Votes	%	±%
Labour	Christopher Swaine	1,266		
Labour	Peter Ruhemann	1,243		
Labour	John Ennis	1,212		
Conservative	Alan Hawkins	788		
Conservative	Patricia Steele	701		
Conservative	Philip Webb	654		
Liberal Democrats	Elizabeth Heydeman	330		
Liberal Democrats	Alan Hendry	322		
Turnout		6,516	39.1	
Labour hold		Swing		
Labour hold		Swing		
Labour hold		Swing		

Thames Ward
Party	Candidate	Votes	%	±%
Conservative	Robert Wilson	1,870		
Conservative	Jeanette Skeats	1,843		
Conservative	David Stevens	1,674		
Liberal Democrats	Vera Bodman	1,151		
Liberal Democrats	James Emery	1,073		
Liberal Democrats	Christopher Harris	944		
Labour	Kathryn Peak	557		
Labour	Moira Dickenson	452		
Labour	Mohammad Nazir	429		
Turnout		9,993	49	
Conservative hold		Swing		
Conservative hold		Swing		
Conservative hold		Swing		

Tilehurst Ward
Party	Candidate	Votes	%	±%
Liberal Democrats	Peter Beard	1,208		
Liberal Democrats	Peter Weston	1,052		
Liberal Democrats	Judith Fry	1,038		
Conservative	Terence Byrne	756		
Conservative	Iona Morris	733		
Labour	Raymond Richens	696		
Conservative	Bernard Garvie	672		
Labour	William Short	553		
Labour	Jaffar Syed	551		
Health and Community Issues Party	Richard Grimsdell	230		
Turnout		7,489	37.7	
Liberal Democrats hold		Swing		
Liberal Democrats hold		Swing		
Liberal Democrats hold		Swing		

Whitley Ward
Party	Candidate	Votes	%	±%
Labour	Michael Orton	983		
Labour	James Hanley	903		
Labour	Mary Singleton-White	849		
Conservative	Barrie Cummings	420		
Conservative	Nicholas Brown	384		
Conservative	David Trim	324		
UKIP	Deano Jones	241		
Liberal Democrats	Max Heydeman	240		
UKIP	Abdul Ahad	236		
Turnout		4,580	24.75	
Labour hold		Swing		
Labour hold		Swing		
Labour hold		Swing		
