= 1988 Reading Borough Council election =

← 1987	5 May 1988	1990 →

15 seats of 45 on council 23 seats needed for a majority
	First party	Second party	Third party
	Lab	Con	SLD
Leader	Mike Orton	Geoff Canning	Jim Day
Party	Labour	Conservative	Liberal Democrats
Seats before	24	16	5
Seats after	25	15	5
Seat change	▲1	▼1	Steady
Popular vote	16,154	16,342	5,706
Percentage	39.9%	40.4%	14.1%
Swing	▲8.9%	▼0.6%	▼12.5%

The 1988 Reading Borough Council election was held on 5 May 1988, at the same time as other local elections across England and Scotland. One third of Reading Borough Council's 45 seats were up for election.

The election saw Labour increase its majority on the council by one seat.

It was the first election following the merger of the SDP-Liberal Alliance to become the "Social and Liberal Democrats" as they were called at this election, before changing the name to Liberal Democrats the following year. Some SDP members opposed to the merger formed a new Social Democratic Party, which fielded several candidates in Reading in 1988.

== Results ==
Reading Borough Council Election, 1988
Party	Seats	Gains	Losses	Net gain/loss	Seats %	Votes %	Votes	+/−
Labour	9	1	0	+1	60.0	39.9	16,154	+8.9
Conservative	5	0	1	-1	33.3	40.4	16,342	-0.6
Liberal Democrats	1	0	0	0	6.7	14.1	5,706	-12.5
SDP	0				0.0	4.2	1,710	New
Green	0				0.0	1.2	481	-0.1
Independent	0				0.0	0.2	62	New

=== Ward results ===
The results in each ward were as follows (candidates with an asterisk* were the previous incumbent standing for re-election):

Abbey Ward
Party	Candidate	Votes	%	±%
Labour	Frederick John Silverthorne* (John Silverthorne)	1,351	62.8	+16.4
Conservative	H. C. S. Webb (Chris Webb)	548	25.5	−7.7
Liberal Democrats	Jeremy P. Sharpe	151	7.0	−9.7
Green	Howard J. Darby	100	4.7	+1.0
Turnout		2,150	32.0	
Labour hold		Swing	+12.05	

Battle Ward
Party	Candidate	Votes	%	±%
Labour	Clive R. Chandler*	1,350	58.9	+11.9
Conservative	Gill S. Turnbull	721	31.4	+0.2
SDP	Stephen R. Hanson	153	6.7	n/a
Green	Maureen P. Gray	69	3.0	+0.1
Turnout		2,293	35.1	
Labour hold		Swing	+5.85	

Caversham Ward
Party	Candidate	Votes	%	±%
Conservative	Pauline S. Palmer*	2,205	67.0	−0.2
Labour	Geoffrey Robert Mander (Geoff Mander)	757	23.0	+4.0
Liberal Democrats	Maureen A. Stagg	204	6.2	−7.6
SDP	Mary E. Hargreaves	126	3.8	n/a
Turnout		3,292	43.5	
Conservative hold		Swing	-2.1	

Church Ward
Party	Candidate	Votes	%	±%
Labour	Maureen Lockey*	1,135	52.0	+5.6
Conservative	Elaine A. Beadle	792	36.3	+2.4
Liberal Democrats	Brian W. Howells	137	6.3	−13.5
SDP	David Gask	119	5.5	n/a
Turnout		2,183	37.9	
Labour hold		Swing	+1.6	

Katesgrove Ward
Party	Candidate	Votes	%	±%
Labour	David Christopher Sutton	1,017	54.1	+7.2
Conservative	Shirley M. Mills	531	28.2	−10.4
Liberal Democrats	Diana M. Bailey	274	14.6	−0.1
SDP	Nikola Sergt	58	3.1	n/a
Turnout		1,880	31.7	
Labour hold		Swing	+8.8	

Kentwood Ward
Party	Candidate	Votes	%	±%
Conservative	Stephen P. Thomas*	1,278	46.6	+6.0
Liberal Democrats	Margaret Bridget Fryett	844	30.8	−11.6
Labour	Stella M. Higgins	522	19.0	+1.9
SDP	Tom F. R. Usher	99	3.6	n/a
Turnout		2,743	41.2	
Conservative hold		Swing	+8.8	

Minster Ward
Party	Candidate	Votes	%	±%
Conservative	Deryck Mitchell Morton*	1,448	51.5	+1.7
Labour	Katharine Neville (Kathy Neville)	1,069	38.0	+10.0
SDP	A. W. Ellis (Tony Ellis)	235	8.4	n/a
Independent	Ivan Young	62	2.2	n/a
Turnout		2,814	42.8	
Conservative hold		Swing	-4.15	

Norcot Ward
Party	Candidate	Votes	%	±%
Labour	Helen M. Hathaway*	1,570	60.1	+16.4
Conservative	Nick P. Burkinshaw	640	24.5	−0.4
Liberal Democrats	Norman A. Edwards	272	10.4	−23.1
SDP	Ian Gray	94	3.6	n/a
Green	David A. Chaplin	37	1.4	−0.4
Turnout		2,613	38.4	
Labour hold		Swing	+6.45	

Park Ward
Party	Candidate	Votes	%	±%
Labour	Martin John Salter*	1,785	58.2	+10.4
Conservative	John Norman Pearson (Norman Pearson)	880	28.7	−4.3
Liberal Democrats	Stephen H. Begg (Steve Begg)	172	5.6	−10.1
Green	Philip J. Unsworth	119	3.9	+0.4
SDP	David J. Cornes	113	3.7	n/a
Turnout		3,069	45.5	
Labour hold		Swing	+7.35	

Peppard Ward
Party	Candidate	Votes	%	±%
Conservative	Mary Irwin*	1,945	57.7	+10.2
Liberal Democrats	Ian M. Fenwick	930	27.6	−16.9
Labour	David M. Booth	397	11.8	+3.9
SDP	Peter E. Littlewood	97	2.9	n/a
Turnout		3,369	45.6	
Conservative hold		Swing	+13.55	

Redlands Ward
Party	Candidate	Votes	%	±%
Labour	Robert Stephen Dimmick*	1,460	45.3	+11.7
Conservative	Heather M. Oliver	1,005	31.2	−3.1
SDP	Robert Owen Biggs Wilson (Rob Wilson)	393	12.2	n/a
Liberal Democrats	Jeremy B. C. Lazenby	367	11.4	−17.8
Turnout		3,225	42.0	
Labour hold		Swing	+7.4	

Southcote Ward
Party	Candidate	Votes	%	±%
Labour	Roberta Richardson (Bobbie Richardson)	1,715	52.2	+11.1
Conservative	Alfred John Irwin* (Jack Irwin)	1,322	40.3	−6.7
Liberal Democrats	Stuart F. Hinson	129	3.9	−11.8
SDP	Anna M. C. Ellis	117	3.6	n/a
Turnout		3,283	49.2	
Labour gain from Conservative		Swing	+8.9	

Thames Ward
Party	Candidate	Votes	%	±%
Conservative	Pam Fuad*	1,872	63.0	+5.8
Liberal Democrats	Annette Hendry	634	21.3	−10.7
Labour	K. Mike Hogarth	311	10.5	+3.0
Green	Louise A. Barnes	156	5.2	+1.9
Turnout		2,973	45.6	
Conservative hold		Swing	+8.25	

Tilehurst Ward
Party	Candidate	Votes	%	±%
Liberal Democrats	Ronald James Day* (Jim Day)	1,536	59.6	+3.7
Conservative	Stephen J. Coles	642	24.9	−6.5
Labour	David R. Warren	399	15.5	+2.8
Turnout		2,577	38.9	
Liberal Democrats hold		Swing	+5.1	

Whitley Ward
Party	Candidate	Votes	%	±%
Labour	John Cook	1,316	66.1	+12.4
Conservative	Philip A. Wickens	513	25.8	−5.7
SDP	Clive R. Jones	106	5.3	n/a
Liberal Democrats	John William Wood	56	2.8	−12.0
Turnout		1,991	29.5	
Labour hold		Swing	+9.05	

== By-elections 1988–1990 ==
=== Katesgrove by-election 1988 ===
Katesgrove By-Election 14 July 1988
Party	Candidate	Votes	%	±%
Labour	Sheila Reilly	787	57.4	+3.3
Conservative	Shirley M. Mills	388	28.3	+0.1
Liberal Democrats	Diana M. Bailey	196	14.3	−0.3
Majority		399	29.1	
Turnout		3,357	22.7	
Labour hold		Swing	+1.6	

The Katesgrove ward by-election in 1988 was triggered by the resignation of Labour councillor Mark Hendry.

=== Battle by-election 1988 ===
Battle By-Election 17 November 1988
Party	Candidate	Votes	%	±%
Labour	David Booth	999	68.1	+9.2
Conservative	Gill Turnbull	373	25.4	−6.0
Liberal Democrats	John Wood	95	6.5	n/a
Majority		626	42.7	
Turnout		1,467		
Labour hold		Swing	+7.6	

The Battle ward by-election in 1988 was triggered by the death of Labour councillor Kevin MacDevitt.

=== Abbey by-election 1989 ===
Abbey By-Election 4 May 1989
Party	Candidate	Votes	%	±%
Labour	Jane Patricia Griffiths			
Conservative	Tony Markham	401		
Liberal Democrats	John Wood	146		
Green	Elizabeth Callies	141		
Majority				
Turnout				
Labour hold		Swing		

The Abbey ward by-election in 1989 was triggered by the death of Labour councillor John Silverthorne. Newspaper coverage indicates that Jane Griffiths, the winning candidate, took about 60% of the votes, but does not give the exact number of votes she received.
