= 2007 Reading Borough Council election =

← 2006	3 May 2007	2008 →

16 seats of 46 on council 24 seats needed for a majority
	First party	Second party	Third party
	Lab	Con	LD
Leader	David Sutton	Fred Pugh	Bob Green
Party	Labour	Conservative	Liberal Democrats
Seats before	32	8	6
Seats after	25	14	7
Seat change	▼7	▲6	▲1
Popular vote	11,634	13,910	7,258
Percentage	32.1%	38.4%	20.0%
Swing	▼1.3%	▲3.4%	▼1.4%
- Results of the 2007 Reading Borough Council election

The 2007 Reading Borough Council election was held on 3 May 2007, at the same time as other local elections across England and Scotland. Sixteen of the 46 seats on Reading Borough Council were up for election, being the usual third of the council plus a by-election in Church ward where Labour councillor Azam Janjua had resigned. Labour lost seven seats on the council, with the Conservatives gaining six seats and the Liberal Democrats one seat. Despite these losses, Labour retained a majority on the council.

== Results summary ==
Reading Borough Council Election, 2007
Party	Seats	Gains	Losses	Net gain/loss	Seats %	Votes %	Votes	+/−
Conservative	7	6	0	+6	43.8	38.4	13,910	+3.4
Labour	6	0	7	-7	37.5	32.1	11,634	-1.3
Liberal Democrats	3	2	1	+1	18.8	20.0	7,258	-1.4
Green	0				0.0	8.6	3,098	-0.2
UKIP	0				0.0	0.5	194	
Independent	0				0.0	0.2	85	
Roman Party	0				0.0	0.1	33	

=== Ward results ===
The results in each ward were as follows (candidates with an asterisk* were the sitting councillor standing for re-election):

Abbey Ward
Party	Candidate	Votes	%	±%
Labour	Mohammed Ayub	690	37.9	
Conservative	Richard Mark Royal	597	32.8	
Liberal Democrats	Warren Andrew Swaine	274	15.1	
Green	Doug Cresswell	225	12.4	
Roman Party	Jean-Louis Pascual	33	1.8	
Turnout		1,819	26.23	
Labour hold		Swing		

Battle Ward
Party	Candidate	Votes	%	±%
Labour	Chris Maskell*	971	51.5	
Conservative	David John Trim	433	23.0	
Green	Adrian Windisch	253	13.4	
Liberal Democrats	Andrew Mark Parsons	229	12.1	
Turnout		1,886	28	
Labour hold		Swing		

Caversham Ward
Party	Candidate	Votes	%	±%
Conservative	Tom Stanway	1,344	50.3	
Labour	Susan Catherine Stainthorp* (Sue Stainthorp)	755	28.3	
Liberal Democrats	Christopher Simon Burden	306	11.5	
Green	David James Patterson	265	9.9	
Turnout		2,670	39.5	
Conservative gain from Labour		Swing		

Church Ward
Party	Candidate	Votes	%	±%
Conservative	Mike Townend	1,095	47.3	
Labour	Christine Margaret Grieve*	854	36.9	
Liberal Democrats	Mark Richard Mills	212	9.1	
Green	Vivienne Joyce Johnson	153	6.6	
Turnout		2,313	32.6	
Conservative gain from Labour		Swing		

Church Ward (by-election)
Party	Candidate	Votes	%	±%
Conservative	Timothy James Harris	1,084	47.1	
Labour	Marian Elise Livingston	822	35.7	
Liberal Democrats	Anthony John Warrell	218	9.5	
Green	Kate Anna Day	176	7.7	
Turnout		2,300	32.6	
Conservative gain from Labour		Swing		

Katesgrove Ward
Party	Candidate	Votes	%	±%
Liberal Democrats	Gareth Daniel Epps	669	36.6	
Labour	Gul Muwaz Khan*	632	34.6	
Conservative	Ricky Singh	273	14.9	
Green	Louise Kaye Keane	168	9.2	
Independent	David Leyland Boobier	85	4.7	
Turnout		1,827	29.3	
Liberal Democrats gain from Labour		Swing		

Kentwood Ward
Party	Candidate	Votes	%	±%
Conservative	Thomas William Steele	1,179	44.3	
Labour	Richard Mark McKenzie*	895	33.6	
Liberal Democrats	Christopher John Brown	464	17.4	
Green	Hugh Swann	124	4.7	
Turnout		2,662	37.5	
Conservative gain from Labour		Swing		

Minster Ward
Party	Candidate	Votes	%	±%
Labour	Paul Stephen Gittings*	1,098	43.9	
Conservative	Sandra Doreen Vickers	976	39.0	
Liberal Democrats	Samuel Stevenson Best-Shaw	226	9.0	
Green	Katherine Jane Buse	202	8.1	
Turnout		2,502	37.3	
Labour hold		Swing		

Norcot Ward
Party	Candidate	Votes	%	±%
Labour	Graeme William Hoskin*	1,160	50.2	
Conservative	James Mark George Cox	672	29.1	
Liberal Democrats	Robin James Bentham	301	7.7	
Green	Mark Adrian Walker	179	7.7	
Turnout		2,312	33.4	
Labour hold		Swing		

Park Ward
Party	Candidate	Votes	%	±%
Conservative	Wazir Hussain	817	30.9	
Labour	Tony Short	810	30.6	
Green	Rob White	688	26.0	
Liberal Democrats	Stuart Alan Frodsham	330	12.5	
Turnout		2,645	38.8	
Conservative gain from Labour		Swing		

Peppard Ward
Party	Candidate	Votes	%	±%
Conservative	Richard James Willis	1,808	50.9	
Liberal Democrats	Annette Hendry*	1,350	38.0	
Labour	Helen Muriel Hathaway	231	6.5	
Green	Kay Mary Harrison	87	2.5	
UKIP	Ronald George Charles Cutting	73	2.1	
Turnout		3,549	48.5	
Conservative gain from Liberal Democrats		Swing		

Redlands Ward
Party	Candidate	Votes	%	±%
Liberal Democrats	Kirsten Ruth Bayes	918	41.3	
Labour	Peter Graham Kayes*	748	33.6	
Conservative	Martyn Edward Washbourne	356	16.0	
Green	Gabriel Berry	156	7.0	
UKIP	John Barrie Dearing	47	2.1	
Turnout		2,225	30.7	
Liberal Democrats gain from Labour		Swing		

Southcote Ward
Party	Candidate	Votes	%	±%
Labour	Peter Martin Ruhemann* (Pete Ruhemann)	1,028	46.8	
Conservative	Alan Hawkins	898	40.9	
Liberal Democrats	Guy William Gipps Penman	168	7.6	
Green	James Eric Towell	103	4.7	
Turnout		2,197	36.2	
Labour hold		Swing		

Southcote Ward (by-election)
Party	Candidate	Votes	%	±%
Labour	Deborah Edwards	1,252	59.9	
Conservative	Patricia Steele	837	40.1	
Turnout		2,089		
Labour hold		Swing		

Thames Ward
Party	Candidate	Votes	%	±%
Conservative	Jeanette Mavis Skeats*	2,164	63.7	
Liberal Democrats	Rodney Pinchen	504	14.8	
Labour	Mary Catherine Waite	438	12.9	
Green	Nicholas Foster (Nick Foster)	215	6.3	
UKIP	Sylvia Mary Chumbley	74	2.2	
Turnout		3,395	47.6	
Conservative hold		Swing		

Tilehurst Ward
Party	Candidate	Votes	%	±%
Liberal Democrats	Christopher John Harris	1,145	46.3	
Conservative	Philip Webb	769	31.1	
Labour	Raymond Michael Richens	425	17.2	
Green	Emma-Louise Scott	134	5.4	
Turnout		2,473	34.9	
Liberal Democrats hold		Swing		

Whitley Ward
Party	Candidate	Votes	%	±%
Labour	James Hanley* (Jim Hanley)	899	51.8	
Conservative	Nicholas Brown (Nick Brown)	529	30.5	
Liberal Democrats	Mike Rice	163	9.4	
Green	Kevin Jackson	146	8.4	
Turnout		1,737	25.3	
Labour hold		Swing		
