= 2000 Reading Borough Council election =

| ← 1999 | 4 May 2000 | 2001 → |

16 seats of 45 on council 23 seats needed for a majority
| | First party | Second party | Third party |
|---|---|---|---|
| | Lab | LD | Con |
| Leader | David Sutton | Ian Fenwick | Fred Pugh |
| Party | Labour | Liberal Democrats | Conservative |
| Seats before | 36 | 6 | 3 |
| Seats after | 36 | 6 | 3 |
| Seat change | Steady | Steady | Steady |
| Popular vote | 12,245 | 5,880 | 8,896 |
| Percentage | 44.6% | 21.4% | 32.4% |
| Swing | ▼4.1% | ▼1.1% | ▲5.0% |

The 2000 Reading Borough Council election was held on 4 May 2000, at the same time as other local elections across England. Sixteen of the 45 seats on Reading Borough Council were up for election, being the usual third of the council (15 seats) plus a by-election in Kentwood ward, caused by the death of Labour councillor Doris Lawrence. At the time of the election there was another vacancy on the council in Church ward, where Labour councillor Maureen Lockey had also died, but the by-election for Church ward was not held until a few weeks later.

Labour regained the vacant seat in the Kentwood by-election, and retained the vacant seat in Church ward at the by-election on 15 June 2000. No seats changed party at these elections, leaving Labour in overall control of the council.

== Results summary ==
Reading Borough Council Election, 2000
| Party | Seats | Gains | Losses | Net gain/loss | Seats % | Votes % | Votes | +/− |
|---|---|---|---|---|---|---|---|---|
| Labour | 13 | 1 | 0 | +1 | 81.3 | 44.6 | 12,245 | -4.1 |
| Conservative | 1 | 0 | 0 | 0 | 6.3 | 32.4 | 8,896 | +5.0 |
| Liberal Democrats | 2 | 0 | 0 | 0 | 12.5 | 21.4 | 5,880 | -1.1 |
| Green | 0 | | | | 0.0 | 1.6 | 452 | +0.3 |

=== Ward results ===
The results in each ward were as follows:

Abbey Ward
| Party | Candidate | Votes | % | ±% |
|---|---|---|---|---|
| Labour | Antony Page* (Tony Page) | 984 | 62.1 | |
| Conservative | Adam Woolhouse | 380 | 24.0 | |
| Liberal Democrats | John Wood | 220 | 13.9 | |
| Turnout | | 1,584 | 20.1 | |
| Labour hold | | Swing | | |

Battle Ward
| Party | Candidate | Votes | % | ±% |
|---|---|---|---|---|
| Labour | Richard Stainthorp* | 707 | 58.0 | |
| Conservative | Dharam Ahuja | 361 | 29.6 | |
| Liberal Democrats | Martin Reilly | 150 | 12.3 | |
| Turnout | | 1,218 | 19.5 | |
| Labour hold | | Swing | | |

Caversham Ward
| Party | Candidate | Votes | % | ±% |
|---|---|---|---|---|
| Labour | Susan Stainthorp* (Sue Stainthorp) | 1,360 | 49.0 | |
| Conservative | Robert Wilson | 1,134 | 40.8 | |
| Liberal Democrats | Diane Elliss | 283 | 10.2 | |
| Turnout | | 2,777 | 32.8 | |
| Labour hold | | Swing | | |

Church Ward
| Party | Candidate | Votes | % | ±% |
|---|---|---|---|---|
| Labour | Chris Goodall* | 608 | 50.1 | |
| Conservative | Paul Swaddle | 383 | 31.6 | |
| Liberal Democrats | Elizabeth Heydeman | 153 | 12.6 | |
| Green | Richard Bradbury | 69 | 5.7 | |
| Turnout | | 1,213 | 21.4 | |
| Labour hold | | Swing | | |

Katesgrove Ward
| Party | Candidate | Votes | % | ±% |
|---|---|---|---|---|
| Labour | Phillip Hingley* | 578 | 55.6 | |
| Conservative | Philip Gibbs | 251 | 24.2 | |
| Liberal Democrats | James Smart | 142 | 13.7 | |
| Green | Philip Unsworth | 68 | 6.5 | |
| Turnout | | 1,039 | 17.2 | |
| Labour hold | | Swing | | |

Kentwood Ward
| Party | Candidate | Votes | % | ±% |
|---|---|---|---|---|
| Labour | David Geary* | 1,020 | 45.4 | |
| Labour | Victoria Lloyd | 1,007 | | |
| Conservative | Richard Willis | 814 | 36.2 | |
| Conservative | Jennifer Rynn | 791 | | |
| Liberal Democrats | Richard Duveen (Ricky Duveen) | 412 | 18.3 | |
| Liberal Democrats | Chris Brown | 377 | | |
| Turnout | | 2,246 | 34.2 | |
| Labour hold | | Swing | | |
| Labour hold | | Swing | | |

Minster Ward
| Party | Candidate | Votes | % | ±% |
|---|---|---|---|---|
| Labour | Catherine Wilton | 1,045 | 50.5 | |
| Conservative | Norman Smart | 683 | 33.0 | |
| Liberal Democrats | Nicolas Lawson | 254 | 12.3 | |
| Green | Hugh Swann | 89 | 4.3 | |
| Turnout | | 2,071 | 28.0 | |
| Labour hold | | Swing | | |

Norcot Ward
| Party | Candidate | Votes | % | ±% |
|---|---|---|---|---|
| Labour | Graeme Hoskin | 952 | 61.1 | |
| Conservative | Alexandra Mowczan | 396 | 25.4 | |
| Liberal Democrats | Thomas Cook | 210 | 13.5 | |
| Turnout | | 1,558 | 23.2 | |
| Labour hold | | Swing | | |

Park Ward
| Party | Candidate | Votes | % | ±% |
|---|---|---|---|---|
| Labour | Jonathan Hartley* (Jon Hartley) | 1,079 | 64.8 | |
| Conservative | Vinod Sharma | 314 | 18.8 | |
| Liberal Democrats | George Hamish Hew Preston Hamish Preston | 273 | 16.4 | |
| Turnout | | 1,666 | 25.0 | |
| Labour hold | | Swing | | |

Peppard Ward
| Party | Candidate | Votes | % | ±% |
|---|---|---|---|---|
| Liberal Democrats | Annette Hendry | 1,211 | 47.2 | |
| Conservative | Christopher Morton | 1,076 | 42.0 | |
| Labour | Keith Uden | 276 | 10.8 | |
| Turnout | | 2,563 | 34.4 | |
| Liberal Democrats hold | | Swing | | |

Redlands Ward
| Party | Candidate | Votes | % | ±% |
|---|---|---|---|---|
| Labour | Rajinder Sohpal* | 792 | 41.4 | |
| Liberal Democrats | Christopher Harris | 561 | 29.4 | |
| Conservative | Abdul Loyes | 394 | 20.6 | |
| Green | Mary Westley | 164 | 8.6 | |
| Turnout | | 1,911 | 21.8 | |
| Labour hold | | Swing | | |

Southcote Ward
| Party | Candidate | Votes | % | ±% |
|---|---|---|---|---|
| Labour | Rosemary Williams* (Rose Williams) | 1,054 | 60.6 | |
| Conservative | Emma Warman | 535 | 30.8 | |
| Liberal Democrats | Sheila Myra Morley (Myra Morley) | 149 | 8.6 | |
| Turnout | | 1,738 | 29.0 | |
| Labour hold | | Swing | | |

Thames Ward
| Party | Candidate | Votes | % | ±% |
|---|---|---|---|---|
| Conservative | Frederick Pugh* (Fred Pugh) | 1,423 | 53.8 | |
| Liberal Democrats | Robin Bentham | 738 | 27.9 | |
| Labour | David Dymond (Dave Dymond) | 482 | 18.2 | |
| Turnout | | 2,643 | 37.4 | |
| Conservative hold | | Swing | | |

Tilehurst Ward
| Party | Candidate | Votes | % | ±% |
|---|---|---|---|---|
| Liberal Democrats | Dennis Morgan | 1,031 | 46.9 | |
| Labour | Christine Grieve | 661 | 30.1 | |
| Conservative | Iona Morris | 444 | 20.2 | |
| Green | Judith Green | 62 | 2.8 | |
| Turnout | | 2,198 | 33.6 | |
| Liberal Democrats hold | | Swing | | |

Whitley Ward
| Party | Candidate | Votes | % | ±% |
|---|---|---|---|---|
| Labour | James Hanley* | 647 | 61.7 | |
| Conservative | Lee Clarke | 308 | 29.4 | |
| Liberal Democrats | Max Thomas Heydeman (Tom Heydeman) | 93 | 8.9 | |
| Turnout | | 1,048 | 15.7 | |
| Labour hold | | Swing | | |

== By-elections 2000–2001 ==
A by-election in Church ward was held on 15 June 2000, triggered by the death of Labour councillor Maureen Lockey, who died in April 2000 ahead of the main elections that year, but there was insufficient time for the by-election to be held at the same time as the main election. The by-election was won by Christine Grieve, retaining the seat for Labour.
