= 1995 Reading Borough Council election =

← 1994	4 May 1995	1996 →

16 seats of 45 on council 23 seats needed for a majority
	First party	Second party	Third party
	Lab	Con	LD
Leader	Mike Orton	Tony Markham	Jim Day
Party	Labour	Conservative	Liberal Democrats
Seats before	29	12	4
Seats after	32	8	5
Seat change	▲3	▼4	▲1
Popular vote	20,897	9,037	6,595
Percentage	56.5%	24.5%	17.8%
Swing	▲8.7%	▼1.9%	▼5.1%

The 1995 Reading Borough Council election was held on 4 May 1995, at the same time as other local elections across Britain. Sixteen of the 45 seats on Reading Borough Council were up for election, being the usual third of the council (15 seats) plus a by-election in Redlands ward, where Labour councillor Robert Sulley had resigned. Labour increased its majority on the council. The Labour leader on the council ahead of the election was Mike Orton, but he stood down as party and council leader immediately after the election, being replaced by David Sutton.

== Results ==
Reading Borough Council Election, 1995
Party	Seats	Gains	Losses	Net gain/loss	Seats %	Votes %	Votes	+/−
Labour	13	3	0	+3	81.3	56.5	20,897	+8.7
Conservative	1	0	4	-4	6.3	24.5	9,037	-1.9
Liberal Democrats	2	1	0	+1	12.5	17.8	6,595	-5.1
Green	0				0.0	1.2	432	-1.3

=== Ward results ===
The results in each ward were as follows (candidates with an asterisk* were the previous incumbent standing for re-election):

Abbey Ward
Party	Candidate	Votes	%	±%
Labour	Antony William Page* (Tony Page)	1,424	72.1	+1.7
Conservative	Mark Vereist Boyle	288	14.6	+0.2
Liberal Democrats	Jeffrey Michael Hannan	265	13.4	−1.9
Turnout		1,976		
Labour hold		Swing	+0.75	

Battle Ward
Party	Candidate	Votes	%	±%
Labour	Malcolm Geoffrey Powers*	1,294	78.8	+16.5
Conservative	Heather Mary Jones	242	14.7	−4.1
Liberal Democrats	Martin Peter Scott	106	6.5	−7.4
Turnout		1,642		
Labour hold		Swing	+10.3	

Caversham Ward
Party	Candidate	Votes	%	±%
Labour	Stephen Peter Waite	1,750	52.3	+16.1
Conservative	Janet Victoria Belcher	1,310	39.1	−6.2
Liberal Democrats	Robin James Bentham	288	8.6	−6.2
Turnout		3,348		
Labour gain from Conservative		Swing	+11.15	

Church Ward
Party	Candidate	Votes	%	±%
Labour	Kathleen Margaret Everett* (Kay Everett)	1,120	71.3	+10.7
Conservative	Peter George Wakeham	258	16.4	−2.0
Liberal Democrats	Susan Kathleen Doughty	193	12.3	−3.1
Turnout		1,571		
Labour hold		Swing	+6.35	

Katesgrove Ward
Party	Candidate	Votes	%	±%
Labour	Phillip Denis Hingley	1,167	72.6	+9.6
Conservative	Shirley Muriel Mills	305	19.0	−0.4
Green	Philip John Unsworth	135	8.4	n/a
Turnout		1,607		
Labour hold		Swing	+5	

Kentwood Ward
Party	Candidate	Votes	%	±%
Labour	Clive Blakesley	1,415	49.8	+9.0
Conservative	Mark Edward Anderson*	754	26.5	−0.4
Liberal Democrats	Simon John Weinberger	674	23.7	−8.6
Turnout		2,843		
Labour gain from Conservative		Swing	+4.7	

Minster Ward
Party	Candidate	Votes	%	±%
Labour	Charles Spalding Croal	1,612	64.8	+15.4
Conservative	David Frederick Henderson	876	35.2	+0.7
Turnout		2,488		
Labour gain from Conservative		Swing	+7.35	

Norcot Ward
Party	Candidate	Votes	%	±%
Labour	Rhodri Hughes*	1,486	69.6	+6.2
Liberal Democrats	Richard Karel Duveen (Ricky Duveen)	338	15.8	−2.6
Conservative	Vera Anne Sutton	247	11.6	−1.6
Green	Joseph Henry Loudon	65	3.0	n/a
Turnout		2,136		
Labour hold		Swing	+3.9	

Park Ward
Party	Candidate	Votes	%	±%
Labour	Norman Arthur Edwards	1,718	76.0	+7.9
Conservative	Karen-Anne Young	299	13.2	−1.5
Liberal Democrats	George Hamish Hew Preston	245	10.8	−0.7
Turnout		2,262		
Labour hold		Swing	+4.7	

Peppard Ward
Party	Candidate	Votes	%	±%
Liberal Democrats	Robert James Green	1,542	49.3	−2.1
Conservative	Jeanette Mavis Skeats	1,058	33.8	−1.9
Labour	Adam Wood	529	16.9	+6.2
Turnout		3,129		
Liberal Democrats gain from Conservative		Swing	-0.1	

Redlands Ward
Party	Candidate	Votes	%	±%
Labour	Anthony Jones*	1,462	61.6	+7.8
Conservative	Simon Howard Robinson	433	18.2	−2.6
Liberal Democrats	Martin John Reilly	321	13.5	−6.2
Green	Mary Preciosa Westly	159	6.7	+0.9
Turnout		2,375		
Labour hold		Swing	+5.2	

Redlands Ward (by-election)
Party	Candidate	Votes	%	±%
Labour	Jonathan Saul Morris (Jonny Morris)	1,473	62.8	
Conservative	Heather Mary Laird	460	19.6	
Liberal Democrats	Anthony John Warrell	413	17.6	
Turnout		2,346		
Labour hold		Swing		

Southcote Ward
Party	Candidate	Votes	%	±%
Labour	Rosemary Phyllis Williams* (Rose Williams)	1,770	77.4	+11.2
Conservative	Susan Elizabeth White (Sue White)	517	22.6	+4.85
Turnout		2,287		
Labour hold		Swing	+4.85	

Thames Ward
Party	Candidate	Votes	%	±%
Conservative	Kenneth Arthur Putt* (Ken Putt)	1,473	47.9	−0.7
Liberal Democrats	Eric Vickers	841	27.3	−1.5
Labour	Betty Tickner (Bet Tickner)	764	24.8	+6.5
Turnout		3,078		
Conservative hold		Swing	+0.4	

Tilehurst Ward
Party	Candidate	Votes	%	±%
Liberal Democrats	Dennis Keith James Morgan	1,370	58.4	−3.3
Labour	Christopher Bernard Gavin	582	24.8	+5.2
Conservative	Clarence Percy Mortimer	321	13.7	−2.1
Green	Judith Veronica Green	73	3.1	+0.2
Turnout		2,346		
Liberal Democrats hold		Swing	-4.25	

Whitley Ward
Party	Candidate	Votes	%	±%
Labour	Ceinwen Williams*	1,331	87.2	+6.6
Conservative	Frazer Keith Elliot Imrie	196	12.8	−6.6
Turnout		1,527		
Labour hold		Swing	+6.6	
