= 1996 Reading Borough Council election =

← 1995	2 May 1996	1997 →

16 seats of 45 on council 23 seats needed for a majority
	First party	Second party	Third party
	Lab	LD	Con
Leader	David Sutton	Jim Day	Tony Markham
Party	Labour	Liberal Democrats	Conservative
Seats before	32	5	8
Seats after	35	6	4
Seat change	▲3	▲1	▼4
Popular vote	18,282	6,865	7,541
Percentage	55.3%	20.8%	22.8%
Swing	▼1.3%	▲2.9%	▼1.6%

The 1996 Reading Borough Council election was held on 2 May 1996, at the same time as other local elections across England. Sixteen of the 45 seats on Reading Borough Council were up for election, being the usual third of the council (15 seats) plus a by-election in Redlands ward, where Labour councillor Tony Jones had resigned.

Labour increased its majority on the council, and David Sutton remained leader of the Labour group and leader of the council. The Liberal Democrats became the second largest group on the council, overtaking the Conservatives, who were left with just four seats. The leader of the Conservative group ahead of the election was Tony Markham, but he lost his seat at the election. Ed Young was appointed leader of the Conservative group shortly afterwards. The Liberal Democrats also replaced their leader after the election, with outgoing leader Jim Day being appointed mayor of Reading, and Ian Fenwick appointed the new leader of the Liberal Democrat group in his place.

== Results ==
Reading Borough Council Election, 1996
Party	Seats	Gains	Losses	Net gain/loss	Seats %	Votes %	Votes	+/−
Labour	13	3	0	+3	81.3	55.3	18,282	-1.3
Conservative	1	0	4	-4	6.3	22.8	7,541	-1.6
Liberal Democrats	2	1	0	+1	12.5	20.8	6,865	+2.9
Green	0				0.0	1.1	380	0.0

=== Ward results ===
The results in each ward were as follows (candidates with an asterisk* were the previous incumbent standing for re-election):

Abbey Ward
Party	Candidate	Votes	%	±%
Labour	Jane Griffiths*	1,317	72.4	+0.3
Conservative	Richard Willis	288	15.8	+1.3
Liberal Democrats	Julian Fertray	214	11.8	−1.6
Turnout		1,819		
Labour hold		Swing	-0.5	

Battle Ward
Party	Candidate	Votes	%	±%
Labour	Andrew Tattersall*	1,170	74.9	−4.0
Conservative	Heather Jones	254	16.3	+1.5
Liberal Democrats	Adam Canning	139	8.9	+2.4
Turnout		1,563		
Labour hold		Swing	-0.45	

Caversham Ward
Party	Candidate	Votes	%	±%
Labour	Susan Stainthorp	1,511	54.8	+2.5
Conservative	Mark Anderson	962	34.9	−4.2
Liberal Democrats	Robin Bentham	284	10.3	+1.7
Turnout		2,757		
Labour gain from Conservative		Swing	+3.35	

Church Ward
Party	Candidate	Votes	%	±%
Labour	Maureen Lockey*	1,012	67.7	−3.6
Conservative	Mark Graves	287	19.2	+2.8
Liberal Democrats	Susan Orchard-Doughty	131	8.8	−3.5
Green	Richard Bradbury	65	4.3	n/a
Turnout		1,495		
Labour hold		Swing	-3.2	

Katesgrove Ward
Party	Candidate	Votes	%	±%
Labour	David Sutton*	959	65.9	−6.7
Conservative	Shirley Mills	275	18.9	−0.1
Liberal Democrats	Andrew Coleman	159	10.9	n/a
Green	Philip Unsworth	62	4.3	−4.1
Turnout		1,455		
Labour hold		Swing	-3.3	

Kentwood Ward
Party	Candidate	Votes	%	±%
Labour	Sandy Scaife	1,200	48.1	−1.7
Liberal Democrats	Richard Duveen	711	28.5	+4.8
Conservative	John Oliver*	586	23.5	−3.1
Turnout		2,497		
Labour gain from Conservative		Swing	+0.7	

Minster Ward
Party	Candidate	Votes	%	±%
Labour	Leighton Yeo	1,414	56.7	−8.1
Conservative	Tony Markham*	805	32.3	−2.9
Liberal Democrats	Roger Hayes	275	11.0	n/a
Turnout		2,494		
Labour gain from Conservative		Swing	-2.6	

Norcot Ward
Party	Candidate	Votes	%	±%
Labour	Helen Hathaway	1,355	72.4	+2.9
Liberal Democrats	Martin Scott	236	12.6	−3.2
Conservative	Vanessa Jones	226	12.1	+0.5
Green	Joseph Loudon	54	2.9	−0.2
Turnout		1,871		
Labour hold		Swing	+3.05	

Park Ward
Party	Candidate	Votes	%	±%
Labour	Jonathan Hartley	1,607	79.1	+3.2
Liberal Democrats	George Preston	424	20.9	+10.0
Turnout		2,031		
Labour hold		Swing	-3.4	

Peppard Ward
Party	Candidate	Votes	%	±%
Liberal Democrats	Christopher Bolt	1,496	51.2	+1.9
Conservative	Mary Irwin*	981	33.5	−0.3
Labour	Adam Wood	447	15.3	−1.6
Turnout		2,924		
Liberal Democrats gain from Conservative		Swing	+1.1	

Redlands Ward
Party	Candidate	Votes	%	±%
Labour	Jonathan Morris*	1,258	57.3	−4.2
Conservative	James Wilson	407	18.6	+0.3
Liberal Democrats	Jeffrey Hannan	376	17.1	+3.6
Green	Mary Westly	153	7.0	+0.3
Turnout		2,194		
Labour hold		Swing	-2.25	

Redlands Ward (by-election)
Party	Candidate	Votes	%	±%
Labour	Elizabeth Winfield-Chislett	1,359	65.5	
Liberal Democrats	Paul Fitchett	715	34.5	
Turnout		2,074		
Labour hold		Swing		

Southcote Ward
Party	Candidate	Votes	%	±%
Labour	Askar Sheibani	1,345	65.3	+12.1
Conservative	Susan White	455	22.1	−0.5
Liberal Democrats	Deon Pheiffer	261	12.7	n/a
Turnout		2,061		
Labour hold		Swing	-5.8	

Thames Ward
Party	Candidate	Votes	%	±%
Conservative	Jeanette Skeats	1,435	46.2	−1.6
Liberal Democrats	Martin Reilly	1,014	32.7	+5.4
Labour	Betty Tickner	654	21.1	−3.7
Turnout		3,103		
Conservative hold		Swing	-3.5	

Tilehurst Ward
Party	Candidate	Votes	%	±%
Liberal Democrats	Jim Day*	1,444	62.8	+4.4
Labour	John Ennis	489	21.3	−3.6
Conservative	David Jones	322	14.0	+0.3
Green	Judith Green	46	2.0	−1.1
Turnout		2,301		
Liberal Democrats hold		Swing	+4.0	

Whitley Ward
Party	Candidate	Votes	%	±%
Labour	James Hanley	1,185	82.1	−5.0
Conservative	Lloyd Henry	258	17.9	+5.0
Turnout		1,443		
Labour hold		Swing	-5.0	
