= 2003 Reading Borough Council election =

← 2002	1 May 2003	2004 →

15 seats of 45 on council 23 seats needed for a majority
	First party	Second party	Third party
	Lab	LD	Con
Leader	David Sutton	Bob Green	Fred Pugh
Party	Labour	Liberal Democrats	Conservative
Seats before	36	6	3
Seats after	35	6	4
Seat change	▼1	Steady	▲1
Popular vote	11,489	7,862	8,502
Percentage	38.9%	26.6%	28.8%
Swing	▼5.3 pp	▲0.6 pp	▲1.9 pp

The 2003 Reading Borough Council election was held on 1 May 2003, at the same time as other local elections across England and Scotland. One third of the 45 seats on Reading Borough Council were up for election. The Conservatives gained one seat at the election from Labour. Otherwise all other seats stayed with the same party and Labour continued have a large majority on the council, with David Sutton continuing as leader of the party and the council.

== Results summary ==
Reading Borough Council Election, 2003
Party	Seats	Gains	Losses	Net gain/loss	Seats %	Votes %	Votes	+/−
Labour	13	0	1	-1	73.3	38.9	11,489	-5.3
Conservative	2	1	0	+1	13.3	28.8	8,502	+1.9
Liberal Democrats	2	0	0	0	13.3	26.6	7,862	+0.6
Green	0				0.0	2.1	614	-0.1
Stop the War	0				0.0	1.9	555	
Independent	0				0.0	1.7	490	

=== Ward results ===
The results in each ward were as follows:

Abbey Ward
Party	Candidate	Votes	%	±%
Labour	Antony Page	983	53.3	+2.0
Conservative	David Stevens	393	21.3	0.0
Liberal Democrats	John Wood	380	20.6	+4.3
Stop the War	Darren Williams	88	4.8	n/a
Turnout		1,844		
Labour hold		Swing	+1.0	

Battle Ward
Party	Candidate	Votes	%	±%
Labour	Tom Crisp	755	46.8	−20.8
Liberal Democrats	James Martin	298	18.5	+3.4
Independent	Adeyinka Oyekan	279	17.3	n/a
Conservative	John Britton	233	14.5	−2.8
Stop the War	Alan Lockey	47	2.9	n/a
Turnout		1,612		
Labour hold		Swing	-12.1	

Caversham Ward
Party	Candidate	Votes	%	±%
Conservative	Robert Wilson	1,372	45.9	+5.3
Labour	Susan Stainthorp (Sue Stainthorp)	1,110	37.1	−6.5
Liberal Democrats	Jonathan Barclay	428	14.3	−1.5
Stop the War	Magda Koc	80	2.7	n/a
Turnout		2,990		
Conservative gain from Labour		Swing	+5.9	

Church Ward
Party	Candidate	Votes	%	±%
Labour	Christopher Goodall	665	46.8	−2.0
Conservative	Dharam Ahuja	416	29.3	+1.0
Liberal Democrats	Anthony Warrell	223	15.7	−5.3
Green	Robert Awbery	77	5.4	n/a
Stop the War	Rachel Mills	39	2.7	n/a
Turnout		1,420		
Labour hold		Swing	-2.15	

Katesgrove Ward
Party	Candidate	Votes	%	±%
Labour	Richard Stainthorp	563	46.6	−9.4
Liberal Democrats	Samuel Best-Shaw	260	21.5	+4.8
Conservative	Shirley Mills	204	16.9	−1.9
Green	Louisa Radice	71	5.9	−2.6
Independent	David Boobier	64	5.3	n/a
Stop the War	Judith Wicks	46	3.8	n/a
Turnout		1,208		
Labour hold		Swing	-7.1	

Kentwood Ward
Party	Candidate	Votes	%	±%
Labour	Richard McKenzie	893	44.3	−3.5
Conservative	Thomas Steele	638	31.7	+0.6
Liberal Democrats	Richard Duveen	451	22.4	+1.2
Stop the War	Leslee Hopper	33	1.6	n/a
Turnout		2,015		
Labour hold		Swing	-2.05	

Minster Ward
Party	Candidate	Votes	%	±%
Labour	Catherine Wilton	965	47.4	−2.3
Conservative	Michael Wade	578	28.4	−2.4
Liberal Democrats	Nicolas Lawson	377	18.5	+4.2
Green	James Towell	86	4.2	−1.0
Stop the War	Pauline Thomas	32	1.6	n/a
Turnout		2,038		
Labour hold		Swing	+0.05	

Norcot Ward
Party	Candidate	Votes	%	±%
Labour	Graeme Hoskin	1,045	63.7	−1.1
Liberal Democrats	Thomas Cook	300	18.3	+1.8
Conservative	Alexandra Mowczan	295	18.0	−0.7
Turnout		1,640		
Labour hold		Swing	-1.45	

Park Ward
Party	Candidate	Votes	%	±%
Labour	Jon Hartley	830	46.7	−9.1
Liberal Democrats	James Spackman	392	22.1	+1.0
Conservative	David Vaughan	240	13.5	+0.6
Green	Mary Westley	189	10.6	+0.5
Stop the War	Peter Burt	125	7.0	n/a
Turnout		1,776		
Labour hold		Swing	-5.05	

Peppard Ward
Party	Candidate	Votes	%	±%
Liberal Democrats	Annette Hendry	1,506	56.9	−1.3
Conservative	Christopher Morton	889	33.6	+2.0
Labour	Andrea Collins	250	9.5	−0.7
Turnout		2,645		
Liberal Democrats hold		Swing	-1.65	

Redlands Ward
Party	Candidate	Votes	%	±%
Labour	Riaz Chaudhri	879	42.5	−0.7
Liberal Democrats	Christopher Harris	598	28.9	−6.4
Conservative	Carole Haskell	337	16.3	+3.3
Green	Hugh Swann	191	9.2	+0.7
Stop the War	Sean O'Leary	65	3.1	n/a
Turnout		2,070		
Labour hold		Swing	+2.85	

Southcote Ward
Party	Candidate	Votes	%	±%
Labour	John Ennis	1,049	59.0	−6.5
Conservative	Patricia Steele	489	27.5	+3.1
Liberal Democrats	Paul Allen	239	13.4	+3.5
Turnout		1,777		
Labour hold		Swing	-4.8	

Thames Ward
Party	Candidate	Votes	%	±%
Conservative	Frederick Pugh (Fred Pugh)	1,722	53.3	+6.6
Liberal Democrats	Sheila Summers	1,310	40.6	−0.7
Labour	Gul Khan	196	6.1	−6.0
Turnout		3,228		
Conservative hold		Swing	+3.65	

Tilehurst Ward
Party	Candidate	Votes	%	±%
Liberal Democrats	Judith Fry	896	45.6	−1.3
Labour	Raymond Richens	519	26.4	−6.3
Conservative	Una Kidd	403	20.5	+2.9
Independent	Richard Grimsdell	147	7.5	n/a
Turnout		1,965		
Liberal Democrats hold		Swing	+2.5	

Whitley Ward
Party	Candidate	Votes	%	±%
Labour	James Hanley	787	61.3	−6.9
Conservative	Nicholas Brown	293	22.8	+0.3
Liberal Democrats	Max Heydeman	204	15.9	+6.6
Turnout		1,284		
Labour hold		Swing	-3.6	
