= 2001 Reading Borough Council election =

← 2000	7 June 2001	2002 →

15 seats of 45 on council 23 seats needed for a majority
	First party	Second party	Third party
	Lab	LD	Con
Leader	David Sutton	Ian Fenwick	Fred Pugh
Party	Labour	Liberal Democrats	Conservative
Seats before	36	6	3
Seats after	36	6	3
Seat change	Steady	Steady	Steady
Popular vote	28,187	14,781	16,209
Percentage	46.8%	24.5%	26.9%

The 2001 Reading Borough Council election was held on 7 June 2001, at the same time as other local elections across England and Northern Ireland, and on the same day as the general election. One third of the 45 seats on Reading Borough Council were up for election. No seats changed party at the election, and the council therefore continued to have a Labour majority, with David Sutton continuing as leader of the party and the council. The Liberal Democrat leader, Ian Fenwick, led his party into the election, but did not stand for re-election. He was replaced as party leader after the election by Bob Green.

== Results summary ==
Reading Borough Council Election, 2001
Party	Seats	Gains	Losses	Net gain/loss	Seats %	Votes %	Votes	+/−
Labour	12	0	0	0	80.0	46.8	28,187	
Conservative	1	0	0	0	6.7	26.9	16,209	
Liberal Democrats	2	0	0	0	13.3	24.5	14,781	
Green	0				0.0	1.8	1,088	

=== Ward results ===
The results in each ward were as follows:

Abbey Ward
Party	Candidate	Votes	%	±%
Labour	June Orton	2,287	57.3	
Conservative	David Stevens	865	21.7	
Liberal Democrats	John Wood	839	21.0	
Turnout		3,991		
Labour hold		Swing		

Battle Ward
Party	Candidate	Votes	%	±%
Labour	Chris Maskell	2,194	62.6	
Conservative	Dharam Ahuja	687	19.6	
Liberal Democrats	Martin Reilly	621	17.7	
Turnout		3,502		
Labour hold		Swing		

Caversham Ward
Party	Candidate	Votes	%	±%
Labour	Steve Waite	2,474	46.5	
Conservative	Andrew Kitching	1,760	33.1	
Liberal Democrats	Diane Elliss	1,081	20.3	
Turnout		5,315		
Labour hold		Swing		

Church Ward
Party	Candidate	Votes	%	±%
Labour	Christine Grieve	1,638	54.9	
Conservative	Tim Milgate	818	27.4	
Liberal Democrats	Anthony Warrell	382	12.8	
Green	Richard Bradbury	148	5.0	
Turnout		2,986		
Labour hold		Swing		

Katesgrove Ward
Party	Candidate	Votes	%	±%
Labour	David Sutton	1,582	51.4	
Liberal Democrats	James Smart	849	27.6	
Conservative	Shirley Mills	647	21.0	
Turnout		3,078		
Labour hold		Swing		

Kentwood Ward
Party	Candidate	Votes	%	±%
Labour	Vikki Lloyd	1,873	46.5	
Conservative	Tom Steele	1,282	31.9	
Liberal Democrats	Richard Duveen	870	21.6	
Turnout		4,025		
Labour hold		Swing		

Minster Ward
Party	Candidate	Votes	%	±%
Labour	Dave Dymond	2,078	49.2	
Conservative	Michael Wade	1,242	29.4	
Liberal Democrats	Nicolas Lawson	694	16.4	
Green	Hugh Swann	207	4.9	
Turnout		4,221		
Labour hold		Swing		

Norcot Ward
Party	Candidate	Votes	%	±%
Labour	Jo Lovelock	2,435	65.1	
Conservative	Alexandra Mowczan	765	20.4	
Liberal Democrats	Thomas Cook	543	14.5	
Turnout		3,743		
Labour hold		Swing		

Park Ward
Party	Candidate	Votes	%	±%
Labour	John Howarth	2,047	51.5	
Liberal Democrats	Richard Hall	884	22.2	
Conservative	Vinod Sharma	690	17.4	
Green	Naomi Emmerson	355	8.9	
Turnout		3,976		
Labour hold		Swing		

Peppard Ward
Party	Candidate	Votes	%	±%
Liberal Democrats	Chris Brown	2,551	50.5	
Conservative	John Oliver	1,684	33.4	
Labour	Azam Janjua	814	16.1	
Turnout		5,049		
Liberal Democrats hold		Swing		

Redlands Ward
Party	Candidate	Votes	%	±%
Labour	Sarah Griffin	1,704	38.5	
Liberal Democrats	Chris Harris	1,593	36.0	
Conservative	Abdul Loyes	864	19.5	
Green	Mary Westley	269	6.1	
Turnout		4,430		
Labour hold		Swing		

Southcote Ward
Party	Candidate	Votes	%	±%
Labour	Pete Ruhemann	2,260	61.8	
Conservative	Matt Palmer	961	26.3	
Liberal Democrats	Sheila Myra Morley (Myra Morley)	434	11.9	
Turnout		3,655		
Labour hold		Swing		

Thames Ward
Party	Candidate	Votes	%	±%
Conservative	Richard Willis	2,228	43.8	
Liberal Democrats	Robin Bentham	1,565	30.7	
Labour	Mary Waite	1,297	25.5	
Turnout		5,090		
Conservative hold		Swing		

Tilehurst Ward
Party	Candidate	Votes	%	±%
Liberal Democrats	Peter Beard	1,570	38.9	
Labour	Ray Richens	1,369	33.9	
Conservative	Iona Morris	992	24.6	
Green	Judith Green	109	2.7	
Turnout		4,040		
Liberal Democrats hold		Swing		

Whitley Ward
Party	Candidate	Votes	%	±%
Labour	Mike Orton	2,135	67.5	
Conservative	Lee Clarke	724	22.9	
Liberal Democrats	Max Thomas Heydeman (Tom Heydeman)	305	9.6	
Turnout		3,164		
Labour hold		Swing		
