= 2006 Reading Borough Council election =

← 2004	4 May 2006	2007 →

17 seats of 46 on council 24 seats needed for a majority
	First party	Second party	Third party
	Lab	Con	LD
Leader	David Sutton	Fred Pugh	Bob Green
Party	Labour	Conservative	Liberal Democrats
Seats before	35	6	5
Seats after	32	8	6
Seat change	▼3 pp	▲2 pp	▲1 pp
Popular vote	11,571	12,131	7,440
Percentage	33.4%	35.0%	21.5%
Swing	▼4.9 pp	▲3.0 pp	▼3.9 pp
- Results of the 2006 Reading Borough Council election

The 2006 Reading Borough Council election was held on 4 May 2006, at the same time as other local elections across England. Seventeen of the 46 seats on Reading Borough Council were up for election, being the usual third of the council plus two by-elections. The by-election in Southcote ward was caused by the resignation of Labour councillor Christopher Swaine, and the by-election in Thames was caused by the resignation of Conservative councillor Rob Wilson, who had been elected as the member of parliament for Reading East the previous year. Labour lost three seats at the election: two to the Conservatives and one to the Liberal Democrats. The Conservatives took the largest number of votes across the borough for the first time since 1992. Despite these losses, Labour remained in control of the council, with David Sutton continuing as leader of the party and the council.

== Results summary ==
Reading Borough Council Election, 2006
Party	Seats	Gains	Losses	Net gain/loss	Seats %	Votes %	Votes	+/−
Conservative	6	2	0	+2	35.3	35.0	12,131	+3.0 pp
Labour	9	0	3	−3	52.9	33.4	11,571	−4.9 pp
Liberal Democrats	2	1	0	+1	11.8	21.5	7,440	−3.9 pp
Green	0				0.0	8.8	3,031	+5.8 pp
Independent	0				0.0	1.3	453	

=== Ward results ===
The results in each ward were as follows (candidates with an asterisk* were the sitting councillor standing for re-election):

Abbey Ward
Party	Candidate	Votes	%	±%
Labour	Betty Tickner* (Bet Tickner)	706	41.0	
Conservative	Timothy James Harris	424	24.6	
Liberal Democrats	Gareth Daniel Epps	305	17.7	
Green	Douglas James Cresswell	196	11.4	
Independent	Thurlow Timothy Robert O'Neill (Bob O'Neill)	69	4.0	
Independent	Jean-Louis Pascual	21	1.2	
Turnout		1,721	27	
Labour hold		Swing		

Battle Ward
Party	Candidate	Votes	%	±%
Labour	Tony Jones*	990	53.6	
Conservative	David John Trim	376	20.3	
Green	Adrian Windisch	241	13.0	
Liberal Democrats	James Edward Spackman	241	13.0	
Turnout		1,848	31	
Labour hold		Swing		

Caversham Ward
Party	Candidate	Votes	%	±%
Conservative	Andrew Cumpsty	1,235	50.0	
Labour	David O'Meara	625	25.3	
Liberal Democrats	Diane Jennifer Elliss	336	13.6	
Green	David James Patterson	276	11.2	
Turnout		2,472	39	
Conservative hold		Swing		

Church Ward
Party	Candidate	Votes	%	±%
Labour	Mohammed Azam Janjua* (Azam Janjua)	913	41.2	
Conservative	Michael Anthony Townend (Mike Townend)	867	39.2	
Liberal Democrats	Christopher John Harris	239	10.8	
Green	Gabriel Berry	195	8.8	
Turnout		2,214	34	
Labour hold		Swing		

Katesgrove Ward
Party	Candidate	Votes	%	±%
Labour	Richard Martin Stainthorp*	647	41.0	
Conservative	Mohinder Singh	332	21.1	
Liberal Democrats	Milorad Susilovic (Mike Susilovic)	276	17.5	
Green	Louise Kaye Keane	221	14.0	
Independent	David Leyland Boobier	101	6.4	
Turnout		1,577	28	
Labour hold		Swing		

Kentwood Ward
Party	Candidate	Votes	%	±%
Conservative	Jennifer Rynn	1,024	37.6	
Labour	Andrea Mary Collins*	888	32.6	
Liberal Democrats	Richard Karel Duveen (Ricky Duveen)	641	23.5	
Green	Katia Richardson	173	6.3	
Turnout		2,726	40	
Conservative gain from Labour		Swing		

Minster Ward
Party	Candidate	Votes	%	±%
Conservative	Terence James Christopher Byrne (Terry Byrne)	865	38.3	
Labour	Mohammed Ayub	846	37.4	
Liberal Democrats	Nicholas David Wright	327	14.5	
Green	Katherine Jane Buse	223	9.9	
Turnout		2,261	35	
Conservative gain from Labour		Swing		

Norcot Ward
Party	Candidate	Votes	%	±%
Labour	Peter Mervyn Jones*	1,134	51.3	
Conservative	Stephen Richard Watcham	578	26.1	
Liberal Democrats	Elizabeth Clare Heydeman	306	13.8	
Green	Mark Adrian Walker	193	8.7	
Turnout		2,211	34	
Labour hold		Swing		

Park Ward
Party	Candidate	Votes	%	±%
Labour	Shirley Isabella Merriott	896	33.8	
Liberal Democrats	Richard James Edward Hall	671	25.3	
Conservative	Wazir Hussain	609	23.0	
Green	Robert James White	474	17.9	
Turnout		2,650	42	
Labour hold		Swing		

Peppard Ward
Party	Candidate	Votes	%	±%
Conservative	Mark Ralph*	1,760	54.4	
Liberal Democrats	James Frederick D'Este Emery	1,051	32.5	
Labour	Mohammad Nazir (Nazir Choudhary)	248	7.7	
Green	Kay Mary Harrison	177	5.5	
Turnout		3,236	46	
Conservative hold		Swing		

Redlands Ward
Party	Candidate	Votes	%	±%
Liberal Democrats	Daisy Benson	1,029	45.4	
Labour	Gul Faraz Khan* (Haji Khan)	677	29.9	
Conservative	Richard Leo Lester (Leo Lester)	398	17.6	
Independent	Peter Burt	163	7.2	
Turnout		2,267	37	
Liberal Democrats gain from Labour		Swing		

Southcote Ward
Party	Candidate	Votes	%	±%
Labour	John Joseph Ennis*	1,108	50.8	
Conservative	Alan Alexander Hawkins	748	34.3	
Liberal Democrats	Anthony John Warrell	203	9.3	
Green	James Eric Towell	122	5.6	
Turnout		2,181	38	
Labour hold		Swing		

Southcote Ward (by-election)
Party	Candidate	Votes	%	±%
Labour	Deborah Jane Edwards	1,252	59.9	
Conservative	Patricia Steele	837	40.1	
Turnout		2,089	38	
Labour hold		Swing		

Thames Ward
Party	Candidate	Votes	%	±%
Conservative	David Bryan Stevens*	1,725	54.5	
Liberal Democrats	Pauline Arthur	618	19.5	
Labour	Mary Catherine Waite	479	15.1	
Green	Nicholas James Foster	245	7.7	
Independent	Joan Rose Lloyd (Jan Lloyd)	99	3.1	
Turnout		3,166	46	
Conservative hold		Swing		

Thames Ward (by-election)
Party	Candidate	Votes	%	±%
Conservative	Isobel Rosalind Norton Ballsdon	1,887	57.7	
Liberal Democrats	Rodney Pinchen	802	24.5	
Labour	Peter Crispin Winfield-Chislett	579	17.7	
Turnout		3,268	48	
Conservative hold		Swing		

Tilehurst Ward
Party	Candidate	Votes	%	±%
Liberal Democrats	Judith Fry* (Jude Fry)	1,023	41.4	
Conservative	Sandra Josephine Bowler	757	30.6	
Labour	Raymond Michael Richens	550	22.2	
Green	Sebastian Tarrik Achaibou	142	5.7	
Turnout		2,472	36	
Liberal Democrats hold		Swing		

Whitley Ward
Party	Candidate	Votes	%	±%
Labour	Mary Singleton-White*	864	53.2	
Conservative	Nicholas James Brown	433	26.7	
Liberal Democrats	Max Thomas Heydeman	174	10.7	
Green	Thomas Hugh Jeremy Chance	153	9.4	
Turnout		1,624	26	
Labour hold		Swing		

== By-elections between 2006 and 2007 ==
Tilehurst by-election 16 November 2006
Party	Candidate	Votes	%	±%
Liberal Democrats	R Duveen	919	47.8	+6.4
Conservative		586	30.5	−0.1
Labour		317	16.5	−5.7
Green		79	4.1	−1.6
Roman Party		21	1.1	+1.1
Majority		333	17.3	
Turnout		1,922		
Liberal Democrats hold		Swing		
