= 1997 Reading Borough Council election =

← 1996	1 May 1997	1999 →

45 seats (whole council) 23 seats needed for a majority
	First party	Second party	Third party
	Lab	LD	Con
Leader	David Sutton	Ian Fenwick	Ed Young
Party	Labour	Liberal Democrats	Conservative
Seats before	35	6	4
Seats after	36	6	3
Seat change	▲1	Steady	▼1
Popular vote	80,832	44,409	55,263
Percentage	44.4%	24.4%	30.4%
Swing	▼10.9%	▲3.6%	▲7.6%

The 1997 Reading Borough Council election was held on 1 May 1997, at the same time as other local elections across England, and on the same day as the general election. All of the 45 seats on Reading Borough Council were up for election, rather than the usual third of the seats. This was in preparation for the local government reorganisation in Berkshire which saw Berkshire County Council abolished and its functions transferred to the six district councils, including Reading, with effect from 1 April 1998. The elections to Berkshire County Council which would ordinarily have been held in 1997 were cancelled. Some outgoing members of Berkshire County Council used the opportunity to seek a seat on the borough council for the first time, including the leader of the Labour group on the county council, Lawrence Silverman.

Whilst Labour's share of the vote fell slightly compared to 1996, Labour increased its number of seats to 36 out of the 45 seats on the council. David Sutton remained leader of the Labour group and leader of the council. The Liberal Democrats, led by Ian Fenwick, remained the second largest party with six seats. The Conservative group was reduced to just three seats. It was led into the election by Ed Young, but he did not stand for re-election as he was standing to be a Member of Parliament in Leigh (in which he was unsuccessful). Fred Pugh was appointed leader of the Conservative group after the election.

== Results summary ==
Reading Borough Council Election, 1997
Party	Seats	Gains	Losses	Net gain/loss	Seats %	Votes %	Votes	+/−
Labour	36	1	0	+1	80.0	44.4	80,832	-10.9
Conservative	3	0	1	-1	6.7	30.4	55,263	+7.6
Liberal Democrats	6	0	0	0	13.3	24.4	44,409	+3.6
Green	0				0.0	0.8	1,483	-0.3

=== Ward results ===
The results in each ward were as follows (candidates with an asterisk* were the previous incumbent standing for re-election):

Abbey Ward
Party	Candidate	Votes	%	±%
Labour	Jane Patricia Griffiths*	2,339		
Labour	Antony William Page* (Tony Page)	2,025		
Labour	Mohammad Iqbal	1,930		
Conservative	Elizabeth Ann Haworth	1,069		
Conservative	Richard James Willis	998		
Conservative	Abdul Loyes	921		
Liberal Democrats	Margaret Anne Jordan	831		
Liberal Democrats	Gillian Kendon	751		
Liberal Democrats	John William Wood	711		
Labour hold		Swing		
Labour hold		Swing		
Labour hold		Swing		

Battle Ward
Party	Candidate	Votes	%	±%
Labour	Malcolm Geoffrey Powers*	2,072		
Labour	Richard Martin Stainthorp*	1,925		
Labour	Andrew Tattersall*	1,460		
Conservative	Kenneth Mackenzie Cameron	865		
Conservative	Heather Mary Jones	799		
Conservative	Peter John Crowe	778		
Liberal Democrats	Francis John Mahon-Daly (Frank Mahon-Daly)	777		
Labour hold		Swing		
Labour hold		Swing		
Labour hold		Swing		

Caversham Ward
Party	Candidate	Votes	%	±%
Labour	Stephen Peter Waite*	2,240		
Labour	Susan Catherine Stainthorp*	2,213		
Labour	David O'Meara	2,097		
Conservative	Sarah Louise Ellis	1,993		
Conservative	Keith Leonard Druce	1,775		
Conservative	Penelope Mary Mordaunt	1,757		
Liberal Democrats	Diane Jennifer Elliss	1,569		
Liberal Democrats	Jonathan Denham Barclay	1,525		
Liberal Democrats	Robin James Bentham	1,499		
Labour hold		Swing		
Labour hold		Swing		
Labour gain from Conservative		Swing		

Church Ward
Party	Candidate	Votes	%	±%
Labour	Maureen Lockey*	1,688		
Labour	Christopher John Goodall	1,648		
Labour	Wilfred John Wild* (Wilf Wild)	1,555		
Conservative	Karen Anne Young	905		
Conservative	Andrew Geoffrey French	882		
Conservative	Francis Timothy Rose (Tim Rose)	834		
Liberal Democrats	Susan Kathleen Orchard-Doughty	518		
Liberal Democrats	Nina Joyce Webb	504		
Liberal Democrats	John Outhwaite	492		
Green	Richard John Kerr Bradbury	317		
Labour hold		Swing		
Labour hold		Swing		
Labour hold		Swing		

Katesgrove Ward
Party	Candidate	Votes	%	±%
Labour	David Christopher Sutton*	1,814		
Labour	Phillip Denis Hingley*	1,784		
Labour	Patricia Thomas* (Trish Thomas)	1,662		
Conservative	Shirley Muriel Mills	869		
Liberal Democrats	Andrew William Colman	836		
Conservative	Paul Charles Laird	729		
Conservative	James Lawrence Wilson	719		
Liberal Democrats	Evelyn Irene Bentham	698		
Liberal Democrats	Guy William Gipps Penman	597		
Green	Philip John Unsworth	364		
Labour hold		Swing		
Labour hold		Swing		
Labour hold		Swing		

Kentwood Ward
Party	Candidate	Votes	%	±%
Labour	Doris Ellen Lawrence	1,839		
Labour	David Llewellyn Geary*	1,814		
Labour	Sandra Joan Scaife* (Sandy Scaife)	1,793		
Conservative	Ruth Elizabeth Margaret Jean Bennett	1,636		
Conservative	Vanessa Gay Jones	1,282		
Conservative	Charlotte Elizabeth Hawkins	1,244		
Liberal Democrats	Martin Peter Scott	1,115		
Liberal Democrats	Nicholas Henry Peter Lawson	1,022		
Liberal Democrats	Deon Louis Pheiffer	945		
Labour hold		Swing		
Labour hold		Swing		
Labour hold		Swing		

Minster Ward
Party	Candidate	Votes	%	±%
Labour	Gregory Bello* (Greg Bello)	2,040		
Labour	Leighton John Yeo*	1,944		
Labour	Charles Spalding Croal* (Charlie Croal)	1,839		
Conservative	Mark Edward John Anderson	1,550		
Conservative	David Neil Jones	1,344		
Conservative	Lloyd Samuel Henry	1,303		
Liberal Democrats	Adam Benedict Canning	748		
Liberal Democrats	Ann Doreen Fenwick	693		
Liberal Democrats	Alan Douglas Hendry	657		
Labour hold		Swing		
Labour hold		Swing		
Labour hold		Swing		

Norcot Ward
Party	Candidate	Votes	%	±%
Labour	Josephine Mary Lovelock* (Jo Lovelock)	2,397		
Labour	Rhodri Hughes*	2,143		
Labour	Peter Mervyn Jones	2,006		
Conservative	Sylvia May Combes	1,098		
Conservative	Patricia Hardy	963		
Conservative	Edward Samuel Rowe	900		
Liberal Democrats	Margaret Bridget Fryett	729		
Liberal Democrats	Jennifer Frances Jackson	630		
Liberal Democrats	Elizabeth Clare Heydeman	604		
Labour hold		Swing		
Labour hold		Swing		
Labour hold		Swing		

Park Ward
Party	Candidate	Votes	%	±%
Labour	Norman Arthur Edwards*	2,333		
Labour	Jonathan Hartley*	2,282		
Labour	Christine Champion Borgars*	2,236		
Liberal Democrats	Sheila Myra Morley	1,050		
Liberal Democrats	George Hamish Hew Preston	1,021		
Conservative	Stephen Thompson	844		
Conservative	Heather Mary Laird	839		
Conservative	Alistair Small	813		
Liberal Democrats	Eric Vickers	813		
Labour hold		Swing		
Labour hold		Swing		
Labour hold		Swing		

Peppard Ward
Party	Candidate	Votes	%	±%
Liberal Democrats	Ian Malcolm Fenwick*	2,454		
Liberal Democrats	Shirley Anne Corti	2,206		
Liberal Democrats	Robert James Green*	2,105		
Conservative	Edward George Brazil	1,932		
Conservative	John Michael Oliver	1,795		
Conservative	Mark Simon Greaves	1,751		
Labour	Christopher John Cook	1,113		
Labour	Mary Catherine Waite	953		
Liberal Democrats	Adam Wood	770		
Liberal Democrats hold		Swing		
Liberal Democrats hold		Swing		
Liberal Democrats hold		Swing		

Redlands Ward
Party	Candidate	Votes	%	±%
Labour	Jonathan Saul Morris* (Jonny Morris)	2,157		
Labour	Rajinder Sohpal*	2,000		
Labour	Elizabeth Anne Winfield-Chislett* (Liz Winfield-Chislett)	1,831		
Liberal Democrats	Thomas James Cook	1,261		
Conservative	Luke Andrew Underhill	1,227		
Conservative	Daniel Fennell	1,210		
Conservative	Markham Gerard Law (Gerry Law)	1,173		
Liberal Democrats	Jeffrey Michael Hannan	1,103		
Liberal Democrats	Anthony John Warrell	1,068		
Labour hold		Swing		
Labour hold		Swing		
Labour hold		Swing		

Southcote Ward
Party	Candidate	Votes	%	±%
Labour	Peter Martin Ruhemann	2,399		
Labour	Rosemary Phyllis Wiliams* (Rose Williams)	2,381		
Labour	Askar Sheibani*	2,017		
Conservative	Margaret Mary Gibbons	1,279		
Conservative	Susan Elizabeth White (Sue White)	1,176		
Conservative	Edwin Alexander Greenland	1,131		
Liberal Democrats	Evelyn Zipporah French	623		
Labour hold		Swing		
Labour hold		Swing		
Labour hold		Swing		

Thames Ward
Party	Candidate	Votes	%	±%
Conservative	Kenneth Arthur Putt* (Ken Putt)	2,390		
Conservative	Frederick Llywelyn Pugh* (Fred Pugh)	2,384		
Conservative	Jeanette Mavis Skeats*	2,355		
Liberal Democrats	Annette Hendry	1,912		
Liberal Democrats	Rodney Pinchen	1,912		
Liberal Democrats	Martin John Reilly	1,583		
Labour	Janet Mary Gavin	1,126		
Labour	William Anthony Short	915		
Labour	Raja Mohammed Banaras	891		
Conservative hold		Swing		
Conservative hold		Swing		
Conservative hold		Swing		

Tilehurst Ward
Party	Candidate	Votes	%	±%
Liberal Democrats	Ronald James Day* (Jim Day)	2,497		
Liberal Democrats	Nicola Jane Canning* (Nici Canning)	1,965		
Liberal Democrats	Everett Richard Clarke Ferriday (Dick Ferriday)	1,823		
Conservative	Paul James Atkinson	1,126		
Conservative	Sarah Catherine Anderson	1,124		
Labour	Michael Connelly	1,063		
Labour	Stephen John Foley	992		
Conservative	Maria Victoria Evans	914		
Labour	Mohammad Mojibur Rahman	757		
Green	Judith Veronica Green	198		
Liberal Democrats hold		Swing		
Liberal Democrats hold		Swing		
Liberal Democrats hold		Swing		

Whitley Ward
Party	Candidate	Votes	%	±%
Labour	Michael Edward Orton* (Mike Orton)	2,276		
Labour	James Timothy Hanley*	1,992		
Labour	Lawrence Silverman	1,992		
Conservative	Barrie James Cummings	982		
Conservative	Derek Gordon Browne	884		
Conservative	Colin Douglas Snider	721		
Liberal Democrats	Max Thomas Heydeman (Tom Heydeman)	562		
Labour hold		Swing		
Labour hold		Swing		
Labour hold		Swing		
