= 1990 Reading Borough Council election =

| ← 1988 | 3 May 1990 | 1991 → |

15 seats of 45 on council 23 seats needed for a majority
| | First party | Second party | Third party |
|---|---|---|---|
| | Lab | Con | LD |
| Leader | Mike Orton | Pauline Palmer | Jim Day |
| Party | Labour | Conservative | Liberal Democrats |
| Seats before | 25 | 15 | 5 |
| Seats after | 27 | 13 | 5 |
| Seat change | ▲2 | ▼2 | Steady |
| Popular vote | 21,868 | 12,924 | 5,896 |
| Percentage | 48.9% | 28.9% | 13.3% |
| Swing | ▲9.0% | ▼11.5% | ▼0.9% |

The 1990 Reading Borough Council election was held on 3 May 1990, at the same time as other local elections across England and Scotland. One third of Reading Borough Council's 45 seats were up for election.

The election saw the Labour Party increase its majority on the council, gaining two seats from the Conservatives.

== Results ==
Reading Borough Council Election, 1990
| Party | Seats | Gains | Losses | Net gain/loss | Seats % | Votes % | Votes | +/− |
|---|---|---|---|---|---|---|---|---|
| Labour | 11 | 2 | 0 | +2 | 73.3 | 48.9 | 21,868 | +9.0 |
| Conservative | 2 | 0 | 2 | -2 | 13.3 | 28.9 | 12,924 | -11.5 |
| Liberal Democrats | 2 | 0 | 0 | 0 | 13.3 | 13.2 | 5,896 | -0.9 |
| Green | 0 | | | | 0.0 | 8.9 | 3,991 | +7.7 |

=== Ward results ===
The results in each ward were as follows (candidates with an asterisk* were the previous incumbent standing for re-election):

Abbey Ward
| Party | Candidate | Votes | % | ±% |
|---|---|---|---|---|
| Labour | David Llewellyn Geary* | 1,636 | 67.5 | +4.6 |
| Conservative | John Gordon Cleminson | 408 | 16.8 | −8.7 |
| Liberal Democrats | John William Wood | 212 | 8.7 | +1.7 |
| Green | Timothy Albert James Rowe | 169 | 7.0 | +2.3 |
| Turnout | | 2,425 | | |
| Labour hold | | Swing | +6.65 | |

Battle Ward
| Party | Candidate | Votes | % | ±% |
|---|---|---|---|---|
| Labour | Richard Martin Stainthorp | 1,576 | 68.0 | 0.0 |
| Conservative | Margaret Mary Gibbons | 480 | 20.7 | −4.7 |
| Green | Howard John Darby (John Darby) | 260 | 11.2 | n/a |
| Turnout | | 2,316 | | |
| Labour hold | | Swing | +2.35 | |

Caversham Ward
| Party | Candidate | Votes | % | ±% |
|---|---|---|---|---|
| Labour | Judith Valerie MacDevitt (Judy MacDevitt) | 1,752 | 43.5 | +20.6 |
| Conservative | Frederick Llywelyn Pugh* (Fred Pugh) | 1,530 | 38.0 | −28.9 |
| Green | David Brian Wright | 395 | 9.8 | n/a |
| Liberal Democrats | Maureen Ann Stagg | 346 | 8.6 | +2.4 |
| Turnout | | 4,023 | | |
| Labour gain from Conservative | | Swing | +24.75 | |

Church Ward
| Party | Candidate | Votes | % | ±% |
|---|---|---|---|---|
| Labour | Wilfred John Wild | 1,658 | 65.2 | +13.2 |
| Conservative | Colin Douglas Snider | 566 | 22.3 | −14.0 |
| Green | Richard John Kerr Bradbury | 318 | 12.5 | +12.5 |
| Turnout | | 2,542 | | |
| Labour hold | | Swing | +13.6 | |

Katesgrove Ward
| Party | Candidate | Votes | % | ±% |
|---|---|---|---|---|
| Labour | Kevin Michael Hogarth (Mike Hogarth) | 1,434 | 67.4 | +10.0 |
| Conservative | Shirley Muriel Mills | 405 | 19.0 | −9.3 |
| Green | Christine Frances Critchfield | 290 | 13.6 | n/a |
| Turnout | | 2,129 | | |
| Labour hold | | Swing | +9.65 | |

Kentwood Ward
| Party | Candidate | Votes | % | ±% |
|---|---|---|---|---|
| Liberal Democrats | George Henry Ford* | 1,085 | 35.2 | +4.4 |
| Conservative | Simon Marcus Gilmour Beckingham | 924 | 30.0 | −16.6 |
| Labour | Philip Robert Grafton | 896 | 29.1 | +10.0 |
| Green | John Christian Gibson | 179 | 5.8 | n/a |
| Turnout | | 3,084 | | |
| Liberal Democrats hold | | Swing | +10.5 | |

Minster Ward
| Party | Candidate | Votes | % | ±% |
|---|---|---|---|---|
| Labour | Margaret Mary Ounsley | 1,659 | 48.8 | +10.8 |
| Conservative | Charles Frederick Sage* | 1,282 | 37.7 | −13.7 |
| Liberal Democrats | Richard Neill Dutton | 275 | 8.1 | n/a |
| Green | Elizabeth Maria Darby | 181 | 5.3 | n/a |
| Turnout | | 3,397 | | |
| Labour gain from Conservative | | Swing | +12.25 | |

Norcot Ward
| Party | Candidate | Votes | % | ±% |
|---|---|---|---|---|
| Labour | Josephine Mary Lovelock* (Jo Lovelock) | 2,089 | 72.1 | +12.0 |
| Green | David Alfred Chaplin | 535 | 18.5 | +17.1 |
| Conservative | Susan Elizabeth White (Sue White) | 272 | 9.4 | −15.1 |
| Turnout | | 2,896 | | |
| Labour hold | | Swing | -2.55 | |

Park Ward
| Party | Candidate | Votes | % | ±% |
|---|---|---|---|---|
| Labour | Gillian Parker* | 1,821 | 64.9 | +2.7 |
| Conservative | Derek John Ching | 500 | 17.8 | −10.8 |
| Green | Philip John Unsworth | 251 | 8.9 | +5.1 |
| Liberal Democrats | Stephen Hope Begg | 233 | 8.3 | +2.7 |
| Turnout | | 2,805 | | |
| Labour hold | | Swing | +8.8 | |

Peppard Ward
| Party | Candidate | Votes | % | ±% |
|---|---|---|---|---|
| Conservative | Geoffrey Walter Canning* (Geoff Canning) | 1,759 | 45.5 | −12.2 |
| Liberal Democrats | John Outhwaite | 1,050 | 27.2 | −0.4 |
| Labour | Robert Brian Bastin (Brian Bastin) | 842 | 21.8 | +10.0 |
| Green | Andrew John McPhee | 211 | 5.5 | n/a |
| Turnout | | 3,862 | | |
| Conservative hold | | Swing | -5.9 | |

Redlands Ward
| Party | Candidate | Votes | % | ±% |
|---|---|---|---|---|
| Labour | Rajinder Sohpal* | 1,548 | 51.0 | +5.8 |
| Conservative | Martyn Jon Boxall | 792 | 26.1 | −5.1 |
| Green | Sallie Ann Sullivan | 389 | 12.8 | n/a |
| Liberal Democrats | Jonathan Timothy Ashby Ball | 304 | 10.0 | −1.4 |
| Turnout | | 3,033 | | |
| Labour hold | | Swing | +5.45 | |

Southcote Ward
| Party | Candidate | Votes | % | ±% |
|---|---|---|---|---|
| Labour | Christine Ann Howell* | 1,857 | 59.7 | +7.5 |
| Conservative | Daphne Janet Holmes | 885 | 28.5 | −11.8 |
| Liberal Democrats | David William Kerrison | 234 | 7.5 | n/a |
| Green | Moira Anne Elizabeth Astin | 134 | 4.3 | n/a |
| Turnout | | 3,110 | | |
| Labour hold | | Swing | +9.65 | |

Thames Ward
| Party | Candidate | Votes | % | ±% |
|---|---|---|---|---|
| Conservative | Adel Hamza Fuad* (Hamza Fuad) | 1,341 | 37.3 | n/a |
| Conservative | Alan Arthur Charles Collier | 764 | 21.2 | n/a |
| Labour | Janet Mary Gavin | 657 | 18.3 | +7.8 |
| Liberal Democrats | Annette Hendry | 556 | 15.5 | −5.9 |
| Green | Anne Margaret McCubbin | 279 | 7.8 | +2.5 |
| Turnout | | 3,597 | | |
| Conservative hold | | Swing | n/a | |

Tilehurst Ward
| Party | Candidate | Votes | % | ±% |
|---|---|---|---|---|
| Liberal Democrats | Nicola Jane Canning | 1,601 | 53.5 | −6.1 |
| Conservative | Anthony Maurice Owen | 631 | 21.1 | −3.8 |
| Labour | Mohammad Iqbal | 623 | 20.8 | +5.3 |
| Green | Timothy Robert Astin | 137 | 4.6 | n/a |
| Turnout | | 2,992 | | |
| Liberal Democrats hold | | Swing | -1.15 | |

Whitley Ward
| Party | Candidate | Votes | % | ±% |
|---|---|---|---|---|
| Labour | Michael Edward Orton* (Mike Orton) | 1,820 | 73.7 | +7.6 |
| Conservative | Barrie James Cummings | 385 | 15.6 | −10.2 |
| Green | Daphne Joan Lawrence | 263 | 10.7 | n/a |
| Turnout | | 2,468 | | |
| Labour hold | | Swing | +8.9 | |
