= 1991 Reading Borough Council election =

← 1990	2 May 1991	1992 →

15 seats of 45 on council 23 seats needed for a majority
	First party	Second party	Third party
	Lab	Con	LD
Leader	Mike Orton	Pauline Palmer	Jim Day
Party	Labour	Conservative	Liberal Democrats
Seats before	27	11	5
Seats after	29	10	4
Seat change	▲2	▼1	▼1
Popular vote	16,671	15,927	6,611
Percentage	40.0%	38.2%	15.9%
Swing	▼8.9%	▲9.3%	▼2.7%
	Fourth party
	Ind
Party	Independent
Seats before	2
Seats after	2
Seat change	Steady
Popular vote	N/A
Percentage	N/A
Swing	N/A

The 1991 Reading Borough Council election was held on 2 May 1991, at the same time as other local elections across England and Wales. One third of Reading Borough Council's 45 seats were up for election. Since the previous election in 1990, the Conservative group on the council had split, with councillors Hamza Fuad and Pam Fuad forming their own independent group, the "Thames Conservatives", reducing the official Conservative numbers from 13 to 11. Neither of the Thames Conservatives' seats were in the third contested in 1991.

The election saw the Labour Party increase its majority on the council.

== Results ==
Reading Borough Council Election, 1990
Party	Seats	Gains	Losses	Net gain/loss	Seats %	Votes %	Votes	+/−
Labour	9	2	0	+2	60.0	40.0	16,671	-8.9
Conservative	5	1	2	-1	33.3	38.2	15,927	+9.3
Liberal Democrats	1	0	1	-1	6.7	15.9	6,611	+2.7
Green	0				0.0	5.8	2,431	-3.1

=== Ward results ===
The results in each ward were as follows (candidates with an asterisk* were the previous incumbent standing for re-election):

Abbey Ward
Party	Candidate	Votes	%	±%
Labour	Antony William Page* (Tony Page)	1,300	55.9	−11.5
Conservative	Simon Matthews	608	26.2	+9.3
Liberal Democrats	John William Wood	302	13.0	+4.3
Green	Daphne Joan Lawrence	114	4.9	−2.1
Turnout		2,324		
Labour hold		Swing	-10.4	

Battle Ward
Party	Candidate	Votes	%	±%
Labour	David M. Booth*	1,210	59.8	−8.3
Conservative	Jan Harding	609	30.1	+9.3
Green	Howard John Darby	206	10.2	−1.1
Turnout		2,025		
Labour hold		Swing	-8.8	

Caversham Ward
Party	Candidate	Votes	%	±%
Conservative	Trevor Jones	1,998	49.4	+11.4
Labour	Mandy Winters	1,298	32.1	−11.5
Liberal Democrats	Maureen Ann Stagg	554	13.7	+5.1
Green	David Brian Wright (Brian Wright)	195	4.8	−5.0
Turnout		4,045		
Conservative hold		Swing	+11.45	

Church Ward
Party	Candidate	Votes	%	±%
Labour	Kathleen Margaret Everett* (Kay Everett)	1,251	55.6	−9.6
Conservative	Colin Douglas Snider	783	34.8	+12.5
Green	Richard John Kerr Bradbury	217	9.6	−2.9
Turnout		2,251		
Labour hold		Swing	-11.05	

Katesgrove Ward
Party	Candidate	Votes	%	±%
Labour	Margaret Stella Singh*	954	54.2	−13.2
Conservative	Shirley Muriel Mills	569	32.3	+13.3
Green	Christine Frances Critchfield	237	13.5	−0.2
Turnout		1,760		
Labour hold		Swing	-13.25	

Kentwood Ward
Party	Candidate	Votes	%	±%
Conservative	Mark Anderson	1,257	39.6	+9.6
Liberal Democrats	Francis John William Mahon-Daly* (Frank Mahon-Daly)	1,015	31.9	−3.2
Labour	Walter Vigor	828	26.1	−3.0
Green	John Christian Gibson	77	2.4	−3.4
Turnout		3,177		
Conservative gain from Liberal Democrats		Swing	+6.4	

Minster Ward
Party	Candidate	Votes	%	±%
Conservative	Derek Gordon E. Browne*	1,487	46.9	+9.1
Labour	Daniel McNamara (Danny McNamara)	1,453	45.8	−3.0
Green	Elizabeth Maria Darby (Maria Darby)	232	7.3	+2.0
Turnout		3,172		
Conservative hold		Swing	+6.05	

Norcot Ward
Party	Candidate	Votes	%	±%
Labour	Rhodri Hughes*	1,523	57.8	−14.3
Conservative	Susan Elizabeth White (Sue White)	565	21.5	+12.1
Liberal Democrats	Elizabeth Heydeman	445	16.9	n/a
Green	David Alfred Chaplin	101	3.8	+14.6
Turnout		2,634		
Labour hold		Swing	-13.2	

Park Ward
Party	Candidate	Votes	%	±%
Labour	Michael D. Price*	1,430	56.4	−8.5
Conservative	Jonathan White	598	23.6	+5.8
Liberal Democrats	Gary Mann	326	12.9	+4.6
Green	Philip John Unsworth	180	7.1	−1.8
Turnout		2,534		
Labour hold		Swing	-7.15	

Peppard Ward
Party	Candidate	Votes	%	±%
Conservative	Frank Heyes*	1,916	54.7	+9.2
Liberal Democrats	John Outhwaite	1,004	28.7	+1.5
Labour	Christine Borgars	464	13.3	−8.5
Green	Andrew John McPhee	117	3.3	−2.1
Turnout		3,501		
Conservative hold		Swing	+3.85	

Redlands Ward
Party	Candidate	Votes	%	±%
Labour	Anthony Jones (Tony Jones)	1,364	45.1	−5.9
Conservative	Robert Owen Biggs Wilson (Rob Wilson)	1,093	36.1	+10.0
Liberal Democrats	Jonathan Timothy Ashby Ball (Jon Ball)	391	12.9	+2.9
Green	Sallie Ann Sullivan	177	5.9	−7.0
Turnout		3,025		
Labour gain from Conservative		Swing	-7.95	

Southcote Ward
Party	Candidate	Votes	%	±%
Labour	Rosemary Phyllis Williams (Rose Williams)	1,527	51.6	−8.1
Conservative	Daphne Janet Holmes (Janet Holmes)	1,255	42.4	+14.0
Green	Timothy Robert Astin (Tim Astin)	177	6.0	+1.7
Turnout		2,959		
Labour gain from Conservative		Swing	-10.75	

Thames Ward
Party	Candidate	Votes	%	±%
Conservative	Kenneth A. Putt* (Ken Putt)	1,805	54.6	n/a
Liberal Democrats	Ian M. Fenwick	889	26.9	+11.5
Labour	Janet Mary Gavin (Jan Gavin)	427	12.9	−5.3
Green	Anne Margaret McCubbin	180	5.5	−2.3
Turnout		3,301		
Conservative hold		Swing	n/a	

Tilehurst Ward
Party	Candidate	Votes	%	±%
Liberal Democrats	Florence Teresa Day* (Paddy Day)	1,685	56.6	+3.1
Conservative	Anthony Maurice Owen (Tony Owen)	772	25.9	+4.9
Labour	Mohammad Iqbal	440	14.8	−6.0
Green	Judith Green	78	2.6	−2.0
Turnout		2,975		
Liberal Democrats hold		Swing	-0.9	

Whitley Ward
Party	Candidate	Votes	%	±%
Labour	Ceinwen Williams	1,202	61.4	−12.3
Conservative	Barrie James Cummings	612	31.3	+15.7
Green	Moira Anne Elizabeth Astin	143	7.3	−3.3
Turnout		1,957		
Labour hold		Swing	-14.0	
