= 1994 Reading Borough Council election =

← 1992	5 May 1994	1995 →

16 seats of 45 on council 23 seats needed for a majority
	First party	Second party	Third party
	Lab	Con	LD
Leader	Mike Orton	Pauline Palmer	Jim Day
Party	Labour	Conservative	Liberal Democrats
Seats before	29	11	4
Seats after	28	12	5
Seat change	▼1	▲1	▲1
Popular vote	18,624	10,266	8,943
Percentage	47.8%	26.4%	23.0%
Swing	▲10.7%	▼14.5%	▲7.6%
	Fourth party
	Ind
Party	Independent
Seats before	1
Seats after	0
Seat change	▼1
Popular vote	0
Percentage	0.0%
Swing	N/A

The 1994 Reading Borough Council election was held on 5 May 1994, at the same time as other local elections across England and Scotland. Sixteen of the 45 seats on Reading Borough Council were up for election, being the usual third of the council (15 seats) plus a by-election in Battle ward, where Labour councillor David Booth had resigned. Prior to the election there had been one independent "Thames Conservative" councillor, Hamza Fuad, who had been elected as a Conservative, but split from the party in 1990. He did not stand for re-election in 1994. Labour retained its majority on the council.

== Results ==
Reading Borough Council Election, 1994
Party	Seats	Gains	Losses	Net gain/loss	Seats %	Votes %	Votes	+/−
Labour	11	0	1	-1	68.8	47.8	18,624	+10.7
Conservative	2	2	1	+1	12.5	26.4	10,266	-14.5
Liberal Democrats	3	1	0	+1	18.8	23.0	8,943	+7.6
Green	0				0.0	2.5	974	-1.0
BNP	0				0.0	0.3	130	N/A

=== Ward results ===
The results in each ward were as follows (candidates with an asterisk* were the previous incumbent standing for re-election):

Abbey Ward
Party	Candidate	Votes	%	±%
Labour	David Llewellyn Geary*	1,630	70.3	+16.4
Liberal Democrats	John William Wood	354	15.3	+6.3
Conservative	Mark Vereist Boyle	334	14.4	−18.4
Turnout		2,318		
Labour hold		Swing	+5.05	

Battle Ward
Party	Candidate	Votes	%	±%
Labour	Richard Martin Stainthorp*	1,103	62.3	+8.6
Conservative	Heather Mary Jones	333	18.8	−13.7
Liberal Democrats	Martin Peter Scott	246	13.9	+4.6
Green	Howard John Darby	89	5.0	+0.5
Turnout		1,771		
Labour hold		Swing	+11.15	

Battle Ward (by-election)
Party	Candidate	Votes	%	±%
Labour	Malcolm Geoffrey Powers	1,296	75.4	n/a
Conservative	Vera Anne Sutton	422	24.6	n/a
Turnout		1,718		
Labour hold		Swing	n/a	

Caversham Ward
Party	Candidate	Votes	%	±%
Conservative	Edward Young (Ed Young)	1,500	45.3	−21.3
Labour	Charles Spalding Croal (Charlie Croal)	1,198	36.2	+13.0
Liberal Democrats	Jennifer Jackson	490	14.8	+6.9
Green	Aidan Carlisle	122	3.7	+1.4
Turnout		3,310		
Conservative gain from Labour		Swing	-17.15	

Church Ward
Party	Candidate	Votes	%	±%
Labour	Wilfred John Wild* (Wilf Wild)	1,030	60.6	+4.9
Conservative	Colin Douglas Snider	313	18.4	n/a
Liberal Democrats	Paul Fitchett	262	15.4	−16.1
Green	Richard John Kerr Bradbury	94	5.5	−7.2
Turnout		1,699		
Labour hold		Swing	n/a	

Katesgrove Ward
Party	Candidate	Votes	%	±%
Labour	Patricia Thomas (Trish Thomas)	1,118	63.0	+13.3
Conservative	Shirley Muriel Mills	344	19.4	−13.8
Liberal Democrats	Mark Gray	313	17.6	+4.3
Turnout		1,775		
Labour hold		Swing	+9.05	

Kentwood Ward
Party	Candidate	Votes	%	±%
Liberal Democrats	George Henry Ford*	1,144	42.0	+10.3
Conservative	Peter Argyle	817	30.0	−16.1
Labour	Philip Starr (Phil Starr)	760	27.9	+8.2
Turnout		2,721		
Liberal Democrats hold		Swing	+13.2	

Minster Ward
Party	Candidate	Votes	%	±%
Labour	Gregory Bello (Greg Bello)	1,348	49.3	+12.0
Conservative	David Frederick Henderson	943	34.5	−17.8
Liberal Democrats	Richard Karel Duveen (Ricky Duveen)	441	16.1	+6.7
Turnout		2,732		
Labour hold		Swing	+14.9	

Norcot Ward
Party	Candidate	Votes	%	±%
Labour	Josephine Mary Lovelock* (Jo Lovelock)	1,603	63.4	+6.5
Liberal Democrats	Simon John Weinberger	465	18.4	n/a
Conservative	Clarence Percy Mortimer (Percy Mortimer)	332	13.1	−24.3
BNP	Graham Coles	130	5.1	n/a
Turnout		2,530		
Labour hold		Swing	-5.95	

Park Ward
Party	Candidate	Votes	%	±%
Labour	Christine Champion Borgars*	1,711	68.1	+1.2
Conservative	Karen-Anne Young	369	14.7	−3.0
Liberal Democrats	Susan Kathleen Doughty (Sue Doughty)	289	11.5	n/a
Green	Philip John Unsworth	145	5.8	−3.0
Turnout		2,514		
Labour hold		Swing	+5.4	

Peppard Ward
Party	Candidate	Votes	%	±%
Liberal Democrats	Ian Malcolm Fenwick	1,774	51.4	+29.2
Conservative	Geoffrey Walter Canning* (Geoff Canning)	1,231	35.7	−28.2
Labour	Kevin Durham	370	10.7	−1.1
Green	Andrew John McPhee	76	2.2	+0.1
Turnout		3,451		
Liberal Democrats gain from Conservative		Swing	+28.7	

Redlands Ward
Party	Candidate	Votes	%	±%
Labour	Rajinder Sohpal	1,487	53.8	+5.6
Conservative	Simon Howard Robinson	575	20.8	−15.4
Liberal Democrats	George Hamish Hew Preston (Hamish Preston)	544	19.7	+7.7
Green	Elisabeth Brelstaff	159	5.8	+2.1
Turnout		2,765		
Labour hold		Swing	+10.4	

Southcote Ward
Party	Candidate	Votes	%	±%
Labour	John Dowson	1,651	66.2	+10.2
Conservative	Susan Elizabeth White (Sue White)	527	21.1	−19.4
Liberal Democrats	Evelyn Zipporah French	235	9.4	n/a
Green	Joseph Henry Loudon	81	3.2	−0.2
Turnout		2,494		
Labour hold		Swing	+14.8	

Thames Ward
Party	Candidate	Votes	%	±%
Conservative	Frederick Llywelyn Pugh (Fred Pugh)	1,544	48.5	+6.7
Liberal Democrats	John Outhwaite	916	28.8	+16.1
Labour	Betty Tickner (Bet Tickner)	582	18.3	+8.7
Green	Stuart McCubbin	139	4.4	+1.9
Turnout		3,494		
Conservative gain from Independent		Swing	n/a	

Tilehurst Ward
Party	Candidate	Votes	%	±%
Liberal Democrats	Nicola Jane Canning* (Nici Canning)	1,470	61.7	+2.6
Labour	Mark Turner	468	19.6	+8.1
Conservative	Daphne Janet Holmes (Janet Holmes)	375	15.7	−11.6
Green	Judith Veronica Green	69	2.9	+0.9
Turnout		2,382		
Liberal Democrats hold		Swing	-2.75	

Whitley Ward
Party	Candidate	Votes	%	±%
Labour	Michael Edward Orton* (Mike Orton)	1,269	80.5	+20.2
Conservative	Barrie James Cummings	307	19.5	−16.3
Turnout		1,576		
Labour hold		Swing	+18.25	

== By-elections 1994–1995 ==
Kentwood By-Election 28 July 1994
Party	Candidate	Votes	%	±%
Labour	Philip Starr (Phil Starr)	951	40.8	+12.9
Liberal Democrats	Simon John Weinberger	752	32.3	−9.8
Conservative	Peter Argyle	627	26.9	−3.1
Majority		199	8.5	
Turnout		2,330	33	
Labour gain from Liberal Democrats		Swing	+11.35	

The Kentwood ward by-election in 1994 was triggered by the death of Liberal Democrat councillor George Ford, just 22 days after he had been appointed mayor of Reading.
