= David Sutton (archivist) =

British archivist and local politician

David Christopher Sutton (born 18 October 1950) is a British archival researcher, cataloguer, indexer, librarian, literary scholar, copyright researcher, food historian, fairtrade campaigner, bus company director, urban regeneration specialist and local politician.

== Career ==
Trained as a librarian/archivist in Dublin and Sheffield, he has been a member of staff at the University of Reading Library since 1982. A party member in the Labour Party since the 1960s, he was leader of Reading Borough Council for 13 years, from May 1995 to May 2008. Then from 2010, he became chair of the board of Reading Buses, the local municipally owned bus company, and also chair of the Reading Fairtrade Group. For his archival research and literary editorial work on the Location Register of English Literary Manuscripts and Letters he was nominated for the McColvin Medal in 1992 and highly commended for the Besterman Medal in 1998. He was awarded the Benson Medal in 2002 by the Royal Society of Literature for outstanding services to literature. He was named Archivist of the Year by the Scone Foundation of New York in 2006. He is currently Director of Research Projects, based in the University Library, at the University of Reading, and an associate member of the University's School of English and American Literature (SEAL). In respect of UK literary archives, he has been Chair (2010–17) of the Group for Literary Archives and Manuscripts (GLAM), and in respect of literary archives worldwide he has been Chair/Président (2010–21) of the Section for Archives of Literature and Art (SLA) of the International Council on Archives (ICA). Since 2012 he has been Principal Investigator for a project initially funded by the Leverhulme Trust and entitled the Diasporic Literary Archives Network. He has written reviews, essays, pamphlets, conference papers and two books on subjects related to the history of food, and has been a trustee and officer of the Oxford Symposium on Food and Cookery. He is a Fellow of the Royal Society of Arts and an Honorary Fellow of the Royal Society of Literature.

== Early life and education ==
Sutton was born in Farnborough, Hampshire on 18 October 1950. His mother was Sheila Sutton, née Bourroughs. His father, Derek John Sutton, was in 1950 a student at the University of Reading, working as a trainee teacher at the E. P. Collier School in Reading. Sutton was educated at grammar schools in Stourbridge and Newport, Essex, before reading English at the University of Leicester from 1968 to 1973 (BA 1971, MA 1973). His tutor and mentor at Leicester was the poet G. S. Fraser, who also supervised his PhD in Comparative literature (University of Westminster, 1978). He has been married since 1973 to the archivist Dr Deborah Jenkins. He is a pescetarian and an atheist (member of the National Secular Society), and lists his hobbies as "badminton, football, walking in Dorset, sitting by the Mediterranean".

== Librarian ==
Sutton worked as a SCONUL trainee librarian at Trinity College, Dublin, Library from 1973 to 1974. He then qualified as a librarian at the University of Sheffield Information School (MA, 1975), and worked as a cataloguer and indexer at the Polytechnic of Central London (1975–1976), the British Library (1976–78), and the University of Warwick Library (1980–82).

== UK archival researcher ==
In October 1982 Sutton became the senior research officer of a new project based in the University of Reading Library and known as the Location Register of English Literary Manuscripts and Letters. This has been a project to locate and list all the literary manuscripts which are available for public use anywhere in the British Isles. The original Location Register of 20th-century English literary manuscripts and letters was published in two large volumes by the British Library in 1988. This was followed in 1995 by the publication, also by the British Library, of Location Register of English literary manuscripts and letters: 18th and 19th centuries. Both these publications attracted good reviews, including one by Julian Barnes. The printed volumes, however, became quite seriously out of date. From 1998 to 2003 work was conducted on a Supplement and revision of the 20th-century data, and the new version was made available on the University of Reading website. The website has been updated by further periods of research funded from 2010 to 2012 and from 2014 to 2021. Since 1994 Sutton has also been the UK editor of a website known as WATCH (Writers Artists & Their Copyright Holders). WATCH is a joint project between the University of Reading and the University of Texas at Austin, and is a database of copyright contacts for writers, artists, and prominent people in other creative fields. The website, hosted by the University of Texas at Austin, states: "Founded in 1994 as a resource principally for copyright questions about literary manuscripts held in the U.S. and the U.K., WATCH has now grown into one of the largest databases of copyright holders in the world."

Archival papers relating to Sutton's work on the Location Register and WATCH projects are in the Michael Holroyd Collection at the British Library (Add MSS 82027-82029). Sutton appears as a character in Holroyd's book Mosaic. Sutton's archival papers relating to the Reading Campaign Against the Cross-Town Route (in the 1980s) and to the leadership of the Reading Borough Labour Group (in the 1990s) are held by Royal Berkshire Archives, but have not yet been opened to the public.

== Local politician ==
Sutton was active in Coventry Labour Party from 1980 to 1982. He was one of the organisers of the Coventry Labour Left, and served briefly as the constituency treasurer. On moving to Reading, he joined Reading Labour Party and was associated with the left of the Labour Party. From 1984 to 1985 he was one of the chairs of the Reading Miners Support Committee, which was twinned with Rose Heyworth Colliery in Abertillery. In 1985 he was one of the founders of the Reading Anti-Apartheid Campaign (as part of the Anti-Apartheid Movement) and in 1986 one of the founders of the Reading Nicaragua Solidarity Campaign. From 1988 to 2008 he was Labour councillor for Katesgrove Ward in Reading. He served as chair of the Waterways Sub-Committee (responsible for the Reading Waterways Plan of 1992, which prefigured the development of the Oracle Centre and other town centre improvements); then as vice-chair and chair of the Arts and Leisure Committee. From 1995 to 2008 he was Leader of the Council, and oversaw a number of projects which formed part of Reading's urban regeneration (Madejski Stadium; town centre pedestrianisation; Oracle Centre; Reading sewage works; new A33; Reading Southside).

He was a speaker on urban regeneration at the Urban Summit (Birmingham, 2002); at Expo 2005 (Nagoya, Japan); and at MIPIM (Le marché international des professionnels de l'immobilier, Cannes, France), 2006 and 2007. He was active in a number of outside bodies, including Local Authorities Against Apartheid, the Nicaragua Solidarity Campaign and the Local Government Information Unit. He lost his seat at the local elections of May 2008. He was the longest-serving council leader in the history of the town of Reading. He has not sought to return to being a councillor since 2008, but has taken on other roles in Reading, including chair of the board of Reading Buses, chair of the Reading Fairtrade Group, trustee of the Reading San Francisco Libre Trust, and partner in the South Reading charity Aspire2. He was deputy chair of the Berkshire Economic Strategy Board (BESB), 2008–2011. He is a trustee, and the vice-chair, of the Earley Charity, one of the most important and wealthy local charities in the South of England, of which he has been a trustee since 1987 and whose history he has researched.

== Food historian ==
From 1978 to 1980 Sutton lived in Paris, where he was registered to study literature at the Université de Paris III (Sorbonne Nouvelle) and history at the Université de Paris VIII, then based in Vincennes. At Vincennes he studied food history under Jean-Louis Flandrin, with distinguished colleagues including Claude Fischler, Jeanne Allard and Pedro Cantero Martín. He contributed to a number of collective projects which were later re-edited and reassembled in Histoire de l'alimentation (Jean-Louis Flandrin, Massimo Montanari). Returning to the UK in 1980, he published a number of short pieces about food history, before political and archival activities began to take precedence. In 2007 he was invited by Pedro Cantero Martín to participate in a symposium on the history of beer entitled La cerveza y su mundo (Carmona, July 2007), where he presented a long paper on the history of English ale. Thereafter he became a regular contributor to the Oxford Symposium on Food and Cookery, and one of his Oxford papers, on the history of figs, was expanded into Figs: a global history (London: Reaktion Books, 2014). His e-book Rich Food Poor Food (2017) includes revised versions other Oxford papers, but also polemical chapters on cats as food and on cannibalism, suggesting links with meat-eating and with current food taboos. He has also written an essay about amaranth and cannibalism (2019 below) which was featured on the BBC Food Programme. He became a trustee of the Oxford Symposium on Food and Cookery in 2013, and the Symposium's Treasurer in 2015.

== International archival researcher ==
Sutton was chair/président of the Section for Archives of Literature and Art (SLA) of the International Council on Archives (ICA) from 2010 to 2021, having been approached to take on this role at a meeting of the ICA Executive Board in Tamanrasset, Algeria in 2009. He sought to encourage diversity within SLA, and its steering committee, elected in 2015 and re-elected in 2021, has included members from Brazil, Namibia, Portugal, Senegal, and Trinidad and Tobago, as well as Australia, Canada, France and the UK. His connections in SLA and the ICA Executive Board were instrumental in the setting up and running of the Diasporic Literary Archives Network from 2012 onwards. This network was formed with the aim of promoting international collaboration in the preservation of, and access to, literary archives. It brought together a group of established scholars and experts from a variety of institutional backgrounds, and across different disciplines and regions, to initiate a context in which to practice and scrutinise methodological and conceptual frameworks. Through a programme of workshops the network sought to establish an international perspective on these issues by examining the complicated and sometimes competing motives of different stakeholders. It succeeded in establishing new partnerships and new patterns of international solidarity (notably with archivists in Grenada, Namibia, Cameroon, and Trinidad and Tobago) which are expected to continue into the future.

== Select Bibliography ==
=== Books ===
- The History of Food: a preliminary bibliography of printed sources. (Coventry: Chapelfields Press, 1982)
- Location Register of Twentieth-century English Literary Manuscripts and Letters [editor] (London: British Library, 1988)
- Location Register of English Literary Manuscripts and Letters: Eighteenth and Nineteenth Centuries [editor] (London: British Library, 1995)
- Figs: a global history (London: Reaktion Books, 2014; Japanese translation, Tokyo: Hara Shobo, 2022)
- Rich Food Poor Food: stories from the great divide in food history ... (Chapelfields Press, 2017)
- The Future of Literary Archives: diasporic and dispersed collections at risk [editor, with Ann Livingstone] (Leeds: Arc Humanities Press; Amsterdam: Amsterdam University Press, 2018)

=== Essays ===
- "A Yeats Borrowing from Mangan". Notes & queries 21 (1974), p. 374.
- "Folkloristic Elements in the Titus Trilogy". Mervyn Peake Review 5 (Autumn 1977), pp. 6–11.
- "Food in Perspective". Museums Journal 82 (1) (June 1982), p. 63.
- "Seeking out literary papers". The Author (Summer 1987), pp. 43–44.
- "The Copyright Detectives". The Bookseller (9 July 1999), pp. 24–26.
- "Keeping WATCH: Tracking down copyright holders". Library & Information Update 4 (12) (December 2005), pp. 42–43.
- "The Language of the Food of the Poor: studying proverbs with Jean-Louis Flandrin", in Food and Language: Proceedings of the Oxford Symposium on Food and Cookery 2009, edited by Richard Hosking. Totnes: Prospect Books, 2010, pp. 330–339.
- "The Stories of Bacalao: myth, legend and history", in Cured, Fermented and Smoked Foods: proceedings of the Oxford Symposium on Food and Cookery 2010, edited by Helen Saberi. Totnes: Prospect Books, 2011, pp. 312–321.
- "The Festive Fruit: a history of figs", in Celebrations: Proceedings of the Oxford Symposium on Food and Cookery 2011, edited by Mark McWilliams. Totnes: Prospect Books, 2012, pp. 335–345.
- "'Four and Twenty Blackbirds Baked in a Pie': a history of surprise stuffings", in Wrapped & Stuffed Foods: proceedings of the Oxford Symposium on Food and Cookery 2012, edited by Mark McWilliams. Totnes: Prospect Books, 2013, pp. 285–294. [free Google eBooks]
- "Nefs: ships of the table and the origins of etiquette", in Material Culture: Proceedings of the Oxford Symposium on Food and Cookery 2013, edited by Mark McWilliams. Totnes: Prospect Books, 2014, pp. 304–313.
- "The Destinies of Literary Manuscripts: past, present and future". Archives and Manuscripts 42 (3), November 2014, pp. 295–300.
- "Markets Under Attack: rioters and regulators in Georgian England", in Markets: Proceedings of the Oxford Symposium on Food and Cookery 2014, edited by Mark McWilliams. Totnes: Prospect Books, 2015, pp. 388–398.
- "The Diasporic Literary Archives Network and the Commonwealth: Namibia, Nigeria, Trinidad & Tobago, and other examples". New Review of Information Networking, 21:1 (2016), pp. 37–51.
- "On GLAM: a view from the chair". ARC Magazine 331 (March 2017), pp. 11–12.
- "Namibian Literary Archives: new beginnings and a possible African model" [with Veno V. Kauaria], in The Future of Literary Archives, op. cit, (2018), pp. 65–74.
- "Literary Archives Around the World: the view from Namibia" [with Veno V. Kauaria]. Comma 2017-1 (2018), pp. 25–35.
- "Archives at Risk: addressing a global concern" [with Jens Boel]. Comma 2017-1 (2018), pp. 111–120.
- "Lines In The Landscape: how the olive-line, the date-line and the vine-line have defined Mediterranean culture", in Food and Landscape: Proceedings of the Oxford Symposium on Food and Cookery 2017, edited by Mark McWilliams. London: Prospect Books, 2018, pp. 359–370.
- "The work of a Section within the International Council on Archives". European Archival Blog, October 2018.
- "Literary Archives in Africa: an overview with examples of recent initiatives". African Research & Documentation 133 (2018), pp. 3–13.
- "Literary Archives in African Countries". UNESCO Memory of the World Programme SCEaR Newsletter (December 2018), pp. 4–9.
- "Background Paper on Archives and Copyright". World Intellectual Property Organization, SCCR 38 (April 2019).
- "Amaranth: Food of the Gods, or Seed of the Devil?", in Seeds: Proceedings of the Oxford Symposium on Food and Cookery 2018, edited by Mark McWilliams. London: Prospect Books, 2019, pp. 286–296.
- "Lebanese Sea Power: Food and the Phoenicians", in Food and Power: Proceedings of the Oxford Symposium on Food and Cookery 2019, edited by Mark McWilliams. London: Prospect Books, 2020, pp. 316–326.
- "Safe Havens for Archives at Risk: a new international initiative". Comma 2020-1/2 (2021), pp. 87-96.
- "Diasporic Literary Archives: a new approach", in The Languages of World Literature, edited by Achim Hölter. Berlin: De Gruyter, 2024, pp. 645-652.
- "WIPO Toolkit on Preservation for Cultural Heritage Institutions" [with Rina Elster Pantalony & Kenneth D. Crews, final version]. World Intellectual Property Organization (April 2024).
- "Linking Archives, Linked Open Data, and the Development of the World-Wide Directory of Repositories Holding Archives of Literature and Art" [with Elizabeth Bassett & Heather Dean]. Comma 2022-1 (2024), pp. 15-30.
- "Guidance on Access to Childhood Records: Access rights of adults to documents relating to their own childhood experience of adoption or being in care" [editor]. International Council on Archives (May 2024).
- "WIPO Toolkit on Access to Copyrighted Works in the Collections of Cultural Heritage Institutions" [with J. Joel Baloyi, Kenneth D. Crews, Carol Newman & Rina Elster Pantalony]. World Intellectual Property Organization (July 2026).
