= 1983 Reading Borough Council election =

← 1979	5 May 1983	1984 →

45 seats (whole council) 23 seats needed for a majority
	First party	Second party	Third party
	Con	Lab	Lib
Leader	Deryck Morton	Mike Orton	Jim Day
Party	Conservative	Labour	Liberal
Alliance			Alliance
Seats before	22	16	11
Seats after	26	13	6
Seat change	▲4	▼3	▼5
Popular vote	61,746	39,951	31,203
Percentage	46.1%	29.8%	23.3%

The 1983 Reading Borough Council election was held on 5 May 1983, at the same time as other local elections across England and Wales. Following ward boundary changes, the number of seats on the council had been reduced from 49 to 45, arranged as 15 wards with three councillors each. All 45 seats on Reading Borough Council were up for election on the new boundaries.

Prior to the election the council was under no overall control, with the Conservatives the largest party, operating a minority administration with informal support from the Liberals. At the election the Conservatives won a majority on the council, taking 26 seats, whilst Labour had 13 seats, and the SDP-Liberal Alliance had 6 seats, all of whom were Liberals.

The leader of the Conservatives on the council, Deryck Morton, had held the council's top political job as chair of the policy committee since 1976, and retained that post after the election, but with his party having a majority. The leader of the council's Labour group was Mike Orton. The Liberal leader, Jim Day, lost his seat, with Basil Dunning becoming Liberal group leader after the election.

== Results ==
Reading Borough Council Election, 1983
Party	Seats	Gains	Losses	Net gain/loss	Seats %	Votes %	Votes	+/−
Conservative	26				57.8	46.1	61,746	
Labour	13				28.9	29.8	39,951	
Alliance	6				13.3	23.3	31,203	
Ecology	0				0.0	0.8	1,039	
Independent	0				0.0	0.0	42	

=== Ward results ===
The results in each ward were as follows (an asterisk* denotes a sitting councillor standing for re-election):

Abbey Ward (three seats)
Party	Candidate	Votes	%	±%
Labour	Tony Page*	1,430	54.9%	
Labour	David Geary	1,389	53.4%	
Labour	John Silverthorne*	1,270	48.8%	
Conservative	Christina Bilbe	827	31.8%	
Conservative	Julian Pacey	826	31.7%	
Conservative	Allan Pizer	813	31.2%	
SDP	Brian Harris	398	15.3%	
SDP	Paul Morrison	334	12.8%	
SDP	John Jackman	310	11.9%	
Ecology	Howard Darby	211	8.1%	
Turnout		7,808		

Battle Ward (three seats)
Party	Candidate	Votes	%	±%
Labour	Moira Dickenson*	1,035	42.4%	
Labour	Graham Rush*	996	40.8%	
Conservative	Gordon Genis	940	38.5%	
Conservative	Susan Kent	919	37.7%	
Labour	Graeme St Clair	917	37.6%	
Conservative	Ann Horsley	906	37.1%	
Liberal	Roger Darch	547	22.4%	
Liberal	Joyce Wicks	533	21.8%	
SDP	Steve Colley-Moore	527	21.6%	
Turnout		7,320		

Caversham Ward (three seats)
Party	Candidate	Votes	%	±%
Conservative	Ron Jewitt*	2,638	73.8%	
Conservative	Fred Pugh*	2,321	64.9%	
Conservative	George Robinson*	2,290	64.1%	
Labour	Pat Mander	769	21.5%	
Labour	John Kirby	745	20.8%	
Labour	Lesley Owen	728	20.4%	
SDP	John Pollock	431	12.1%	
SDP	Sean O'Connell	414	11.6%	
SDP	Mary Hargreaves	386	10.8%	
Turnout		10,722		

Church Ward (three seats)
Party	Candidate	Votes	%	±%
Labour	Dave Absolom*	1,057	46.2%	
Labour	June Orton*	1,015	44.3%	
Labour	Maureen Lockey	958	41.8%	
Conservative	Heather Oliver	852	37.2%	
Conservative	Timothy Oliver	844	36.9%	
Conservative	John Irwin	819	35.8%	
Liberal	Janet Digby	467	20.4%	
Liberal	Philip Gash	461	20.1%	
Liberal	Derek Nathan	395	17.3%	
Turnout		6,868		

Katesgrove Ward (three seats
Party	Candidate	Votes	%	±%
Labour	Margaret Singh*	1,073	46.8%	
Conservative	Shirley Mills	1,049	45.7%	
Labour	Ron Williams*	1,033	45.1%	
Labour	Ross Sutton	1,015	44.3%	
Conservative	Peter Wager	997	43.5%	
Conservative	Felicity Holden	994	43.3%	
SDP	Carolyn Foster-Moore	275	12.0%	
SDP	John Monks	255	11.1%	
SDP	Russell Robles (Note: Listed as a candidate ahead of the election, but his vote not recorded in the results summary; presumably an omission by the newspaper.)			
Ecology	Geoffrey Darnton	188	8.2%	
Turnout		6,879		

Kentwood Ward (three seats)
Party	Candidate	Votes	%	±%
Conservative	Thomas Dicker	1,489	42.8%	
Conservative	Derek Browne	1,486	42.7%	
Conservative	Stephen Thomas	1,459	42.0%	
Liberal	Jim Day*	1,282	36.9%	
Liberal	George Ford*	1,124	32.3%	
Liberal	Tess MacFarlane*	1,121	32.2%	
Labour	Chris Giles	826	23.8%	
Labour	Peter Watkins	825	23.7%	
Labour	Pete Ruhemann	817	23.5%	
Turnout		10,429		

Minster Ward (three seats)
Party	Candidate	Votes	%	±%
Conservative	Joe Slater*	1,756	60.2%	
Conservative	Charles Sage*	1,708	58.6%	
Conservative	Simon Coombs*	1,702	58.4%	
Labour	Chris Cannon	768	26.3%	
Labour	Richard Stainthorp	763	26.2%	
Labour	Charles Brannigan	745	25.6%	
SDP	Mike Foster-Moore	468	16.1%	
SDP	Alan Jackson	430	14.8%	
SDP	Roderic Pratt	405	13.9%	
Turnout		8,745		

Norcot Ward (three seats)
Party	Candidate	Votes	%	±%
Liberal	Basil Dunning*	1,290	42.8%	
Liberal	John Freeman*	1,184	39.3%	
Liberal	Ann Grant*	1,135	37.7%	
Labour	Helen Hathaway	1,002	33.3%	
Labour	Phil Armson	999	33.2%	
Labour	Norma Sinclair	991	32.9%	
Conservative	Francis Rose	838	27.8%	
Conservative	Gerald Hughes	802	26.6%	
Conservative	Frederick Anderson	798	26.5%	
Turnout		9,039		

Park Ward (three seats)
Party	Candidate	Votes	%	±%
Conservative	John Bale	1,317	40.4%	
Conservative	Norman Pearson	1,282	39.3%	
Conservative	Simon Oliver	1,276	39.1%	
Labour	Helen Kayes*	1,156	35.4%	
Labour	Brian Bastin	1,129	34.6%	
Labour	Geoff Mander*	1,089	33.4%	
SDP	Jim Pemberton	772	23.7%	
SDP	Roderick Campbell	699	21.4%	
SDP	Marie Williams	683	20.9%	
Ecology	Philip Unsworth	387	11.9%	
Turnout		9,790		

Peppard Ward (three seats)
Party	Candidate	Votes	%	±%
Conservative	Geoff Lowe*	2,188	59.5%	
Conservative	Geoff Canning*	2,177	59.2%	
Conservative	Mary Irwin	2,114	57.5%	
SDP	Clive Jones	1,195	32.5%	
SDP	Barbara Fairhead	1,183	32.2%	
Liberal	Martyn Allies	1,171	31.9%	
Labour	Gerry McGreevy	349	9.5%	
Labour	Hugh Morland	338	9.2%	
Labour	Nidan Singh	312	8.5%	
Turnout		11,027		

Redlands Ward (three seats)
Party	Candidate	Votes	%	±%
Conservative	John Oliver*	1,138	39.3%	
Conservative	Tony Markham*	1,115	38.5%	
Conservative	Martin Lower*	1,084	37.4%	
Labour	Ruth Berkley	936	32.3%	
Labour	Robert Dimmick	910	31.4%	
Labour	David Law	902	31.1%	
SDP	Howard Rodaway	840	29.0%	
Liberal	David Langshaw	787	28.1%	
SDP	Susan MacKenzie-Williams	726	25.1%	
Ecology	Maria Callies	253	8.7%	
Turnout		8,691		

Southcote Ward (three seats)
Party	Candidate	Votes	%	±%
Conservative	David Kirk	1,805	51.7%	
Conservative	Anna Bradley	1,798	51.5%	
Conservative	John Irwin	1,797	51.4%	
Labour	Laurence Cavannagh	1,132	32.4%	
Labour	Bob Mitchell	1,111	31.8%	
Labour	Tony Jones	1,080	30.9%	
Liberal	Janet Holmes	627	17.9%	
SDP	Charles Bond	578	16.5%	
SDP	Jean Howarth	552	15.8%	
Turnout		10,480		

Thames Ward (three seats)
Party	Candidate	Votes	%	±%
Conservative	Brian Fowles*	2,458	70.3%	
Conservative	Hamza Fuad*	2,280	65.2%	
Conservative	Deryck Morton*	2,262	64.7%	
Liberal	Ian Fenwick	812	23.2%	
Liberal	Annette Hendry	755	21.6%	
Liberal	Jill Verran	712	20.4%	
Labour	Philip Hingley	414	11.8%	
Labour	David Winchester	408	11.7%	
Labour	Pam Lockley	383	11.0%	
Turnout		10,484		

Tilehurst Ward (three seats)
Party	Candidate	Votes	%	±%
Liberal	Paddy Day*	1,520	50.5%	
Liberal	Janet Bond*	1,378	45.8%	
Liberal	Tom Heydeman*	1,323	44.0%	
Conservative	Terence Kelly	1,230	40.9%	
Conservative	Rannard Wilson	1,175	39.0%	
Conservative	Patricia Platt	1,165	38.7%	
Labour	Frank Harris	421	14.0%	
Labour	Mary Ranson	398	13.2%	
Labour	Gerald Scott	378	12.6%	
Independent	Maurice White	42	1.4%	
Turnout		9,030		

Whitley Ward (three seats)
Party	Candidate	Votes	%	±%
Labour	Doris Lawrence*	1,379	62.0%	
Labour	Mike Orton*	1,310	58.9%	
Labour	Jack Price*	1,250	56.2%	
Conservative	John Cleminson	685	30.8%	
Conservative	Vera Cleminson	671	30.2%	
Conservative	Philip Wickens	656	29.5%	
Liberal	Mark Goldup	252	11.3%	
Liberal	Arthur Stinton	247	11.1%	
Liberal	Stephen Begg	219	9.9%	
Turnout		6,669		
