= 1979 Reading Borough Council election =

← 1976	3 May 1979	1983 →

49 seats (whole council) 25 seats needed for a majority
	First party	Second party	Third party
	Con	Lab	Lib
Leader	Deryck Morton	Geoff Mander	Geoff Salisbury
Party	Conservative	Labour	Liberal
Seats before	24	13	12
Seats after	22	16	11
Seat change	▼2	▲3	▼1
Popular vote	123,224	86,591	68,404
Percentage	44.2%	31.1%	24.6%

The 1979 Reading Borough Council election was held on 3 May 1979, alongside local elections across England and Wales and the general election. All 49 seats on Reading Borough Council were contested.

Prior to the election, the council had been under no overall control, with the Conservatives the largest party. Labour saw the biggest net increase in its seats, gaining three, but the council remained under no overall control with the Conservatives as the largest party. After the election the Conservatives had 22 seats (down from 24), Labour had 16 seats (up from 13), and the Liberals had 11 seats (down from 12).

The party leaders on the council ahead of the election were Deryck Morton for the Conservatives, Geoff Mander for Labour, and Geoff Salisbury for the Liberals. Geoff Salisbury did not stand at the election, and the Liberals' former leader Jim Day became party leader again after the election, having spent the 1978–1979 civic year as mayor of Reading. Deryck Morton was re-appointed to the council's most senior political role as chair of the policy committee after the election, effectively leading a Conservative minority administration.

== Results ==
Reading Borough Council Election, 1979
Party	Seats	Gains	Losses	Net gain/loss	Seats %	Votes %	Votes	+/−
Conservative	22	1	3	-2	44.9	44.2	123,224	
Labour	16	3	0	+3	32.7	31.1	86,591	
Liberal	11	0	1	-1	22.4	24.6	68,404	
Independent	0				0.0	0.1	176	
Communist	0				0.0	0.0	139	

=== Ward results ===
The results in each ward were as follows (candidates with an asterisk(*) were the previous incumbent standing for re-election, candidates with a dagger(†) were sitting councillors contesting different wards):

Abbey Ward (two seats)
Party	Candidate	Votes	%	±%
Labour	Graham Ransley Chapman	676		
Labour	Helen Ruth Kayes	649		
Conservative	Keith John Hardie	592		
Conservative	John Norman Pearson	566		
Labour hold		Swing		
Labour gain from Conservative		Swing		

Battle Ward (two seats)
Party	Candidate	Votes	%	±%
Labour	Antony William Page†	1,480		
Labour	Frances Margaret (Bunty) Nash	1,474		
Conservative	Roy Ernest Simmonds	1,043		
Conservative	Adel Hamza Fuad	1,009		
Labour hold		Swing		
Labour hold		Swing		

Castle Ward (three seats)
Party	Candidate	Votes	%	±%
Labour	Graham Anthony Rush*	1,848		
Labour	Moira Elizabeth Dickenson	1,705		
Labour	Ronald John Williams	1,694		
Conservative	Maurice Gordon Lidgley	1,658		
Conservative	Roy Tranter	1,657		
Conservative	Richard Charles Young	1,547		
Communist	Stanley Frederick Cooke	139		
Labour hold		Swing		
Labour hold		Swing		
Labour hold		Swing		

Caversham Ward (three seats)
Party	Candidate	Votes	%	±%
Conservative	Ronald William Jewitt*	3,248		
Conservative	George Frank Robinson*	2,641		
Conservative	Frederick Llywelyn Pugh*	2,624		
Labour	Thomas Henry Clifton	1,329		
Labour	David Daniel Malvern	1,251		
Labour	Alexander Pravda	1,113		
Liberal	David Henry Oliphant	578		
Liberal	Jennifer Ann Lewis	516		
Liberal	David Michael Williams	440		
Conservative hold		Swing		
Conservative hold		Swing		
Conservative hold		Swing		

Caversham Park Ward (two seats)
Party	Candidate	Votes	%	±%
Conservative	Hamish Macbeth	1,622		
Conservative	Geoffrey Alan Lowe*	1,544		
Liberal	Harold Arnold Stoddart*	1,437		
Liberal	Derek Michael Nathan	1,171		
Conservative hold		Swing		
Conservative gain from Liberal		Swing		

Christchurch Ward (four seats)
Party	Candidate	Votes	%	±%
Labour	Marian Jeanne Absolom*	2,741		
Labour	Peter Francis (Dave) Absolom	2,733		
Labour	Christopher John Goodall	2,527		
Labour	June Elizabeth Orton	2,389		
Conservative	Robert Douglas Cox*	2,053		
Conservative	Reginald Bishop*	2,015		
Conservative	Gladys Emily Matthews	1,857		
Conservative	Vivienne Joy Rose	1,722		
Liberal	Philip Ernest Gash	1,045		
Liberal	Elizabeth Margaret O'Rourke	910		
Liberal	Gladys Ilfreda Massam	896		
Liberal	David James Wilson	853		
Labour hold		Swing		
Labour hold		Swing		
Labour gain from Conservative		Swing		
Labour gain from Conservative		Swing		

Katesgrove Ward (two seats)
Party	Candidate	Votes	%	±%
Labour	Geoffrey Robert Mander*	1,801		
Labour	Margaret Stella Singh*	1,703		
Conservative	Christina Margaret Rowland	1,185		
Conservative	Vera Anne Sutton	1,107		
Labour hold		Swing		
Labour hold		Swing		

Minster Ward (six seats)
Party	Candidate	Votes	%	±%
Conservative	Adelina Ethel Baker*	4,235		
Conservative	Joseph Edwin Slater	4,128		
Conservative	Simon Christopher Coombs*	4,056		
Conservative	Charles Frederick Sage*	4,040		
Conservative	Lynne Geraldine Bradley	4,033		
Conservative	Sydney Harry Harris	3,813		
Labour	William George Mander†	3,053		
Labour	Kenneth Alan Diment	3,008		
Labour	Douglas Ivor Buckley	2,929		
Labour	Alaster James Rutherford	2,797		
Labour	Frederick John Silverthorne	2,755		
Labour	Robert Mitchell	2,603		
Liberal	Christopher Bucke	1,448		
Liberal	David George Hobbs	1,416		
Liberal	Mary Laura Clark	1,400		
Liberal	Daphne Janet Holmes	1,340		
Conservative hold		Swing		
Conservative hold		Swing		
Conservative hold		Swing		
Conservative hold		Swing		
Conservative hold		Swing		
Conservative hold		Swing		

Norcot Ward (six seats)
Party	Candidate	Votes	%	±%
Liberal	Leslie Basil Dunning*	3,376		
Liberal	Peter Beard*	3,290		
Liberal	Terence James Francis*	3,252		
Liberal	John Freeman*	3,233		
Liberal	Ann Joan Grant	3,134		
Liberal	Max Thomas Heydeman	2,957		
Conservative	Martin John Chapman	2,553		
Conservative	Cherry Lesley Clark	2,513		
Conservative	Mary Irwin	2,508		
Conservative	Geoffrey Gascoigne Lawrence†	2,477		
Conservative	Peter William Wells	2,364		
Conservative	Anthony James Markham	2,362		
Labour	Reginald Harry (Joe) Bristow†	2,352		
Labour	George Edward Cruse	2,266		
Labour	Frank Alfred Harris	2,234		
Labour	Peter John Ranson	2,206		
Labour	Helen Muriel Hathaway	2,125		
Labour	Paul Francis Schofield	2,029		
Liberal hold		Swing		
Liberal hold		Swing		
Liberal hold		Swing		
Liberal hold		Swing		
Liberal hold		Swing		
Liberal hold		Swing		

Park Ward (three seats)
Party	Candidate	Votes	%	±%
Conservative	Douglas Alan Chilvers*	1,795		
Conservative	Stephen John Foley	1,727		
Conservative	Frank Neil Rowberry	1,671		
Labour	John Francis Ryan	1,605		
Labour	Joyclyn Alden (Joe) Williams	1,550		
Labour	Ian Warrick	1,528		
Liberal	Anthony Paul Dodd	1,048		
Liberal	David Paul Gasson	1,015		
Liberal	Charles William Looker	909		
Conservative hold		Swing		
Conservative hold		Swing		
Conservative hold		Swing		

Redlands Ward (three seats)
Party	Candidate	Votes	%	±%
Conservative	John Michael Oliver*	1,824		
Conservative	John Derrick Lawford*	1,805		
Conservative	Martin Charles Lower*	1,765		
Labour	Norman Barry Jones	1,123		
Labour	Peter Kenneth Jones	1,103		
Labour	Verina R. Jones	1,055		
Liberal	David Charles Johnson	1,051		
Liberal	Liam Gavin Grant	1,047		
Liberal	Suzette Milano	961		
Conservative hold		Swing		
Conservative hold		Swing		
Conservative hold		Swing		

Thames Ward (five seats)
Party	Candidate	Votes	%	±%
Conservative	Geoffrey Walter Canning	5,845		
Conservative	Brian Anthony Fowles	5,704		
Conservative	Eric Gordon Davies*	5,687		
Conservative	Kathleen Lucy Sage*	5,638		
Conservative	Deryck Mitchell Morton*	5,270		
Liberal	Edgar Martyn Allies	1,994		
Liberal	Katherine Elizabeth Gwinnell	1,810		
Liberal	Jill Marianne Green	1,771		
Labour	Patricia Mary Mander	1,556		
Liberal	Margaret Imogen Pravda	1,529		
Labour	Michael William Johnson	1,446		
Liberal	Gary Paul Wilkins	1,368		
Labour	Gillian Angela Lidbetter	1,322		
Labour	Susan Barbara Malvern	1,285		
Labour	Graeme Francis St Clair	1,238		
Conservative hold		Swing		
Conservative hold		Swing		
Conservative hold		Swing		
Conservative hold		Swing		
Conservative hold		Swing		

Tilehurst Ward (five seats)
Party	Candidate	Votes	%	±%
Liberal	Ronald James (Jim) Day*	4,499		
Liberal	Florence Teresa (Paddy) Day*	4,350		
Liberal	Janet Brenda Bond	3,651		
Liberal	George Henry Ford*	3,610		
Liberal	Teresa Macfarlane	3,406		
Conservative	Michael John Caseley	2,412		
Conservative	Clive Anthony (Robert) Coles	2,262		
Conservative	John Maxwell Coote	2,204		
Conservative	Terence Kelly	2,177		
Conservative	Gillian Glencairn Waite	2,054		
Labour	Jennifer Susan Cottee	1,438		
Labour	William Phillip Gothard	1,365		
Labour	Ann Joan Gothard	1,347		
Labour	Sylvia Mary Steele	1,330		
Labour	Eric Edgar Merry	1,323		
Independent	Maurice Reginald White	176		
Liberal hold		Swing		
Liberal hold		Swing		
Liberal hold		Swing		
Liberal hold		Swing		
Liberal hold		Swing		

Whitley Ward (three seats)
Party	Candidate	Votes	%	±%
Labour	Doris Ellen Lawrence*	2,662		
Labour	Michael Edward Orton*	2,524		
Labour	John Rees (Jack) Price*	2,321		
Conservative	Joan Eileen Cox	1,620		
Conservative	John Gordon Cleminson	1,565		
Conservative	Gerald Arthur Hughes	1,427		
Liberal	Richard Wilfred Church	585		
Liberal	Jean Valerie Parkin	569		
Liberal	Norman Arthur Edwards	539		
Labour hold		Swing		
Labour hold		Swing		
Labour hold		Swing		

== By-elections 1979–1983 ==
=== Thames by-election 1980 ===
Thames By-Election 24 January 1980
Party	Candidate	Votes	%	±%
Conservative	Hamza Fuad	2,320	61.7	−3.1
Liberal	Martyn Allies	944	25.1	+5.6
Labour	Pat Mander	497	13.2	−2.5
Majority		1,376	36.6	
Turnout		3,761	34	
Conservative hold		Swing		

The Thames ward by-election in 1980 was triggered by the resignation of Conservative councillor Eric Davies.

=== Christchurch and Redlands by-elections 1981 ===
By-elections for the two wards of Christchurch and Redlands were held on 7 May 1981, alongside elections to Berkshire County Council. The Christchurch by-election was triggered by the resignation of Labour councillor Chris Goodall, and the Redlands by-election was triggered by the death of Conservative councillor John Lawford.

Christchurch By-Election 7 May 1981
Party	Candidate	Votes	%	±%
Labour	Sandy Scaife	1,762	59.1	
Liberal	Felicity Kaplan	1,221	40.9	
Majority		541	18.1	
Turnout		2,983		
Labour hold		Swing		

Redlands By-Election 7 May 1981
Party	Candidate	Votes	%	±%
Conservative	Tony Markham	934	34.8	−11.1
Labour	Jill Lake	894	33.3	+5.4
Liberal	Richard Church	853	31.8	+5.7
Majority		40	1.5	
Turnout		2,681		
Conservative hold		Swing	-8.25	

=== Abbey by-election 1981 ===
Abbey By-Election 24 September 1981
Party	Candidate	Votes	%	±%
Labour	John Silverthorne	437	47.4	−6.0
Conservative	Norman Pearson	244	26.5	−20.2
SDP	Howard Rodaway	241	26.1	n/a
Majority		193	20.9	
Turnout		922		
Labour hold		Swing	+7.1	

The Abbey ward by-election in 1981 was triggered by the resignation of Labour councillor Graham Chapman.
