= 1976 Reading Borough Council election =

← 1973	5 May 1976	1979 →

46 seats (whole council) 24 seats needed for a majority
	First party	Second party	Third party
	Con	Lab	Lib
Leader	Deryck Morton	Chris Goodall	Jim Day
Party	Conservative	Labour	Liberal
Seats before	16	16	14
Seats after	21	14	11
Seat change	▲5	▼2	▼3

The 1976 Reading Borough Council election was held on 6 May 1976, at the same time as other local elections across England and Wales. All 46 seats on Reading Borough Council were up for election. The council remained under no overall control, but with the Conservatives becoming the largest party. The Conservative group leader, Deryck Morton, subsequently took the council's most senior political job as chairman of the policy committee, leading a Conservative minority administration.

== Ward results ==
The results in each ward were as follows:

Abbey Ward (two seats)
Party	Candidate	Votes	%	±%
Labour	William George Mander (Bill Mander)	383		
Conservative	Barclay Lane	373		
Conservative	J. Pearson	369		
Labour	R. Williams	339		
Labour hold		Swing		
Conservative gain from Labour		Swing		

Battle Ward (two seats)
Party	Candidate	Votes	%	±%
Labour	Reginald Harry Bristow (Joe Bristow)	894		
Labour	Thomas Frank Wise (Frank Wise)	883		
Conservative	M. Irwin	519		
Conservative	J. Harper	515		
Liberal	J. Dickson	146		
Liberal	E. Dickson	143		
Labour hold		Swing		
Labour hold		Swing		

Castle Ward (three seats)
Party	Candidate	Votes	%	±%
Labour	Robert J. Garnett (Bob Garnett)	1,028		
Labour	Graham Anthony Rush	962		
Labour	Antony William Page (Tony Page)	947		
Conservative	E. Farmer	801		
Conservative	P. Brigham	792		
Conservative	B. Jones	773		
Liberal	C. Milsom	440		
Liberal	R. Harris	434		
Liberal	J. Mennear	430		
Labour hold		Swing		
Labour hold		Swing		
Labour hold		Swing		

Caversham Ward (three seats)
Party	Candidate	Votes	%	±%
Conservative	Ronald William Jewitt (Ron Jewitt)	2,190		
Conservative	George Frank Robinson	1,840		
Conservative	Frederick Llywelyn Pugh (Fred Pugh)	1,812		
Labour	T. Clifton	937		
Labour	M. Johnson	891		
Labour	A. Tolan	862		
Independent	A. Freeman	277		
Conservative hold		Swing		
Conservative hold		Swing		
Conservative hold		Swing		

Christchurch Ward (four seats)
Party	Candidate	Votes	%	±%
Labour	Marianne Jeanne Absolom	1,315		
Labour	William Maurice John Huntley (John Huntley)	1,241		
Labour	Nigel Webb	1,185		
Conservative	R. Bishop	1,178		
Conservative	R. Cox	1,172		
Labour	H. Young	1,165		
Conservative	C. Cross	1,147		
Conservative	C. Hembrow	1,092		
Liberal	H. Crichton	547		
Liberal	D. O'Rourke	484		
Liberal	N. James	422		
Labour hold		Swing		
Labour hold		Swing		
Labour hold		Swing		
Conservative gain from Labour		Swing		

Katesgrove Ward (two seats)
Party	Candidate	Votes	%	±%
Labour	Geoffrey Robert Mander (Geoff Mander)	848		
Labour	Margaret Stella Singh	765		
Conservative	N. Rowberry	724		
Conservative	J. Wilkins	655		
Labour hold		Swing		
Labour hold		Swing		

Minster Ward (six seats)
Party	Candidate	Votes	%	±%
Conservative	Adelina Ethel Baker (Lena Baker)	2,538		
Conservative	Simon Christopher Coombs	2,516		
Conservative	Geoffrey Gascoigne Lawrence	2,500		
Conservative	Charles Frederick Sage	2,451		
Conservative	Joyce A. Talbot	2,427		
Conservative	Kenneth Loder (Ken Loder)	2,422		
Labour	C. Bosley	1,828		
Labour	D. Buckley	1,800		
Labour	A. Knott	1,750		
Labour	K. Davison	1,742		
Labour	K. Diment	1,736		
Labour	F. Silverthorne	1,699		
Liberal	M. Clarke	688		
Liberal	C. Bucke	659		
Liberal	H. Goodacre	635		
Liberal	D. Holmes	615		
Liberal	P. Pratt	614		
Liberal	D. Hobbs	600		
Conservative hold		Swing		
Conservative hold		Swing		
Conservative hold		Swing		
Conservative hold		Swing		
Conservative hold		Swing		
Conservative hold		Swing		

Norcot Ward (six seats)
Party	Candidate	Votes	%	±%
Liberal	Leslie Basil Dunning (Basil Dunning)	1,711		
Liberal	Terence James Francis (Terry Francis)	1,687		
Liberal	John Freeman	1,657		
Liberal	Geoffrey David Salisbury	1,633		
Liberal	Peter Beard	1,626		
Liberal	Dennis Hopkins	1,594		
Conservative	P. Madges	1,519		
Conservative	J. Pacey	1,504		
Conservative	F. Rogers	1,475		
Conservative	R. Hinckley	1,467		
Conservative	G. Waite	1,458		
Conservative	F. Rose	1,391		
Labour	W. Gothard	1,072		
Labour	F. Harris	1,059		
Labour	H. Hathaway	1,033		
Labour	H. Hinder	981		
Labour	R. Smith	959		
Labour	A. Pravda	934		
Liberal hold		Swing		
Liberal hold		Swing		
Liberal hold		Swing		
Liberal hold		Swing		
Liberal hold		Swing		
Liberal hold		Swing		

Park Ward (three seats)
Party	Candidate	Votes	%	±%
Conservative	Douglas Alan Chilvers	1,333		
Conservative	Veronica Horman	1,255		
Conservative	Michael Francis	1,251		
Labour	P. Jones	943		
Labour	S. Harvey	904		
Labour	B. Lyons	889		
Liberal	N. Edwards	697		
Liberal	M. Bliss	633		
Liberal	A. Looker	606		
Independent	V. Short	51		
Independent	K. Pullen	45		
Conservative hold		Swing		
Conservative hold		Swing		
Conservative hold		Swing		

Redlands Ward (three seats)
Party	Candidate	Votes	%	±%
Conservative	John Michael Oliver	1,316		
Conservative	John Derrick Lawford	1,277		
Conservative	Martin Charles Lower	1,249		
Liberal	V. Angell	1,151		
Liberal	R. Brough	1,055		
Liberal	S. Milano	999		
Labour	P. Jones	455		
Labour	V. Jones	406		
Labour	G. Kennedy	406		
Conservative gain from Liberal		Swing		
Conservative gain from Liberal		Swing		
Conservative gain from Liberal		Swing		

Thames Ward (four seats)
Party	Candidate	Votes	%	±%
Conservative	Cyril William Aucock	2,906		
Conservative	Kathleen Lucy Sage	2,900		
Conservative	Eric Gordon Davies	2,884		
Conservative	Deryck Mitchell Morton	2,701		
Liberal	K. Gwinnell	951		
Liberal	J. Green	933		
Liberal	K. Elliott	838		
Labour	P. Mander	686		
Labour	K. Sainsbury	633		
Labour	G. Lidbetter	599		
Labour	R. Hammersley	569		
Conservative hold		Swing		
Conservative hold		Swing		
Conservative hold		Swing		
Conservative hold		Swing		

Tilehurst Ward (five seats)
Party	Candidate	Votes	%	±%
Liberal	Ronald James Day (Jim Day)	2,475		
Liberal	Frances Teresa Day (Paddy Day)	2,367		
Liberal	Desmond A. Allen (Des Allen)	2,194		
Liberal	George Henry Ford	2,175		
Liberal	Michael Ingrey	2,122		
Conservative	A. Davis	1,441		
Conservative	M. Caseley	1,423		
Conservative	S. Foley	1,323		
Conservative	J. Stevens	1,315		
Conservative	I. Grant	1,304		
Labour	J. Cottee	821		
Labour	D. Bull	777		
Labour	A. Gothard	777		
Labour	L. Hinder	772		
Labour	M. Steele	748		
Independent	M. White	60		
Liberal hold		Swing		
Liberal hold		Swing		
Liberal hold		Swing		
Liberal hold		Swing		
Liberal hold		Swing		

Whitley Ward (three seats)
Party	Candidate	Votes	%	±%
Labour	Michael Edward Orton (Mike Orton)	1,187		
Labour	John Rees Price (Jack Price)	1,186		
Labour	Doris Ellen Lawrence	1,185		
Conservative	G. Matthews	797		
Conservative	P. Wickens	623		
Conservative	R. Woodroff	536		
Liberal	B. Trussell	275		
Liberal	M. Law	234		
Liberal	H. Trussell	231		
Labour hold		Swing		
Labour hold		Swing		
Labour hold		Swing		

== By-elections 1976–1979 ==
=== Christchurch by-election 1977 ===
Christchurch By-Election 31 March 1977
Party	Candidate	Votes	%	±%
Conservative	Robert Douglas (Bob) Cox	1,061	39.0	−2.9
Labour	Maurice Dixon	1,023	37.6	−7.2
Liberal	Max Thomas Heydeman	637	23.4	+10.1
Majority		38	1.4	
Turnout		2,721		
Conservative gain from Labour		Swing	+2.15	

The Christchurch ward by-election in 1977 was triggered by the resignation of Labour councillor John Huntley.

=== Thames by-election April 1977 ===
On 1 April 1977 the borough was enlarged by the addition of parts of the parishes of Eye and Dunsden, Kidmore End and Mapledurham, all from South Oxfordshire. The number of councillors on Reading Borough Council was increased from 46 to 49 as a result. The two South Oxfordshire district councillors representing much of the transferred area automatically became Reading borough councillors without needing to be re-elected, representing a new ward of Caversham Park. These two were Geoff Lowe and Harold Stoddart, both Liberals (although Lowe later defected to the Conservatives in 1978). Reading's existing Thames and Caversham wards were also enlarged, and the increase in the size of Thames ward justified a fifth councillor being elected for that ward, for which a by-election was held on 21 April 1977, which was won by the Conservatives. After the by-election and two transfers, the balance of the council was 23 Conservatives, 13 Labour and 13 Liberals.

Thames By-Election 21 April 1977
Party	Candidate	Votes	%	±%
Conservative	Brian Fowles	2,619	75.3	
Liberal	Katherine Gwinnell	485	13.9	
Labour	Pat Mander	373	10.7	
Majority		2,134	61.4	
Turnout		3,477	33	
Conservative win (new seat)				

=== Thames by-election September 1977 ===
Thames By-Election 22 September 1977
Party	Candidate	Votes	%	±%
Conservative	John Stevens	2,121	74.1	−1.2
Liberal	Katherine Gwinnell	387	13.5	−0.4
Labour	Helen Kayes	354	12.4	+1.6
Majority		1,734	60.6	−0.8
Turnout		2,862	30	−3
Conservative hold		Swing	-0.4	

The September 1977 by-election was triggered by the death of Conservative councillor Cyril Aucock.

=== Minster by-election 1977 ===
Minster By-Election 1 December 1977
Party	Candidate	Votes	%	±%
Conservative	Roseanna Rowberry	1,911	57.1	
Labour	Bunty Nash	1,143	34.1	
Liberal	Janet Holmes	293	8.8	
Majority		768	22.9	
Turnout		3,347	29	
Conservative hold		Swing		

The Minster ward by-election in 1977 was triggered by the resignation of Conservative councillor Joyce Talbot.
