= 1973 Reading Borough Council election =

7 June 1973	1976 →

46 seats (whole council) 24 seats needed for a majority
	First party	Second party	Third party
	Lab	Con	Lib
Leader	Bob Towner	Edward Busby	Jim Day
Party	Labour	Conservative	Liberal
Seats after	16	16	14
Popular vote	43,929	43,731	31,524
Percentage	36.3%	36.2%	26.1%

The 1973 Reading District Council election was the first election to the reconstituted Reading Borough Council, which changed from being a county borough to a non-metropolitan district under the Local Government Act 1972. At the time of the election it had yet to be decided whether the new district would hold borough status and so contemporary reports describe the election as being to "Reading District Council", although it was subsequently confirmed that the new council would be a borough.

The elections were held on 7 June 1973, in common with other new non-metropolitan district councils in England and Wales. The councillors elected in 1973 were to shadow the outgoing corporation until they formally took over on 1 April 1974. The election left the council with no overall control, with Labour winning most votes by a very narrow margin, but holding the same number of seats (16) as the Conservatives. The Liberals with 14 seats held the balance of power.

The Labour leader on the old corporation was Bob Towner and the Conservative leader was Edward Busby. Both led their parties into the elections, but neither man stood for a seat on the new council. After the election, Chris Goodall was appointed Labour group leader, and William Badnall the Conservative group leader. The Liberal group leader remained Jim Day, who had been party leader on the old corporation. A Labour / Liberal administration was eventually formed, with Jim Day being appointed to the council's top political job as chair of the policy committee.

== Results ==
Reading Borough Council Election, 1973
Party	Seats	Gains	Losses	Net gain/loss	Seats %	Votes %	Votes	+/−
Labour	16				34.8	36.3	43,929	
Conservative	16				34.8	36.2	43,731	
Liberal	14				30.4	26.1	31,524	
Independent	0				0.0	1.5	1,760	

=== Ward results ===
The results in each ward were as follows:

Abbey Ward (two seats)
Party	Candidate	Votes	%	±%
Labour	William George Mander (Bill Mander)	486		
Labour	Roger Scaife	447		
Conservative	Bryan Jones	325		
Labour win				
Labour win				

Battle Ward (two seats)
Party	Candidate	Votes	%	±%
Labour	Reginald Harry Bristow (Joe Bristow)	813		
Labour	Frank Wise	771		
Conservative	Roger Brown	369		
Labour win				
Labour win				

Castle Ward (three seats)
Party	Candidate	Votes	%	±%
Labour	Graham Anthony Rush	900		
Labour	Robert J. Garnett (Bob Garnett)	840		
Labour	Antony William Page (Tony Page)	816		
Conservative	Eric Gordon Davis	736		
Conservative	Frederick Llywelyn Pugh (Fred Pugh)	706		
Conservative	F. Tim Rose	684		
Liberal	David Scott	413		
Liberal	Mary Clarke	372		
Liberal	Leon D. Summers	366		
Labour win				
Labour win				
Labour win				

Caversham Ward (three seats)
Party	Candidate	Votes	%	±%
Conservative	Ronald William Jewitt (Ron Jewitt)	1,127		
Conservative	George Robinson	1,119		
Conservative	Michael Francis	1,061		
Labour	Charles Evans	914		
Labour	Harry Young	896		
Labour	Tom Clifton	875		
Conservative win				
Conservative win				
Conservative win				

Christchurch Ward (four seats)
Party	Candidate	Votes	%	±%
Labour	Fred L. Roberts	1,347		
Labour	Christopher John Goodall (Chris Goodall)	1,286		
Labour	Marian Jeanne Absolom	1,271		
Labour	William Maurice John Huntley (John Huntley)	1,262		
Conservative	Kitty C. Foote	915		
Liberal	Hester M. Crichton	912		
Liberal	Elizabeth M. O'Rourke	910		
Conservative	Patricia Mellows	838		
Liberal	Richard W. Hellier	800		
Conservative	Frances A. Spark	766		
Labour win				
Labour win				
Labour win				
Labour win				

Katesgrove Ward (two seats)
Party	Candidate	Votes	%	±%
Labour	Harry Wheeler	820		
Labour	Geoffrey Robert Mander (Geoff Mander)	738		
Conservative	Stanley Beamish	441		
Independent	John Still	317		
Labour win				
Labour win				

Minster Ward (six seats)
Party	Candidate	Votes	%	±%
Conservative	William Wykeham Edward Badnall	2,342		
Conservative	Geoffrey Gascoigne Lawrence	2,291		
Conservative	Simon Christopher Coombs	2,284		
Conservative	Charles Frederick Sage	2,247		
Conservative	Joyce A. Talbot	2,247		
Conservative	Kenneth Loder (Ken Loder)	2,243		
Labour	Frances Margaret Nash (Bunty Nash)	2,140		
Labour	Leslie Glanville	1,934		
Labour	John Allen	1,929		
Labour	Lawrence Brennan	1,898		
Labour	Robert Mitchell (Bob Mitchell)	1,896		
Labour	Daphne A. Dunkason	1,890		
Conservative win				
Conservative win				
Conservative win				
Conservative win				
Conservative win				
Conservative win				

Norcot Ward (six seats)
Party	Candidate	Votes	%	±%
Liberal	Terence James Francis (Terry Francis)	2,240		
Liberal	Geoffrey David Salisbury (Geoff Salisbury)	2,210		
Liberal	John Freeman	2,195		
Liberal	Peter Beard	2,162		
Liberal	Dennis L. Hopkins	2,137		
Liberal	Peter I. Pratt	2,042		
Labour	William (Bill) Gothard	914		
Conservative	Peter S. Madges	913		
Conservative	Francis W. Rogers	885		
Labour	Ian R. Hills	885		
Labour	Ann Watkins	843		
Labour	Peter Watkins	827		
Labour	F. J. S. Ribero (Chico Ribero)	803		
Labour	Ron J. Tyler	757		
Liberal win				
Liberal win				
Liberal win				
Liberal win				
Liberal win				
Liberal win				

Park Ward (three seats)
Party	Candidate	Votes	%	±%
Conservative	Roland Kirby	1,367		
Conservative	Douglas Alan Chilvers	1,360		
Conservative	Veronica McCarthy	1,314		
Labour	Jean Thomas	1,226		
Labour	Bernard Lyons	1,223		
Labour	Brian Thomas	1,221		
Conservative win				
Conservative win				
Conservative win				

Redlands Ward (three seats)
Party	Candidate	Votes	%	±%
Liberal	Eric G. Baxter	1,317		
Liberal	Victor John Angell (Vic Angell)	1,312		
Liberal	Antony G. Milano (Tony Milano)	1,079		
Conservative	R. John Goodman	987		
Conservative	Gladys Emily Matthews	917		
Conservative	John A. Thornley	875		
Labour	Robert H. Smith	271		
Labour	Pam M. Nixon	260		
Labour	Ron Nixon	253		
Liberal win				
Liberal win				
Liberal win				

Thames Ward (four seats)
Party	Candidate	Votes	%	±%
Conservative	Kathleen Sage	2,487		
Conservative	Ivy Sylvia Blagrove (Silvia Blagrove)	2,457		
Conservative	Cyril William Aucock	2,452		
Conservative	Deryck Mitchell Morton	2,425		
Labour	Margaret Mander	597		
Labour	Patricia Mary Mander (Pat Mander)	593		
Labour	Eva Harding	585		
Labour	Priscilla Mares	567		
Conservative win				
Conservative win				
Conservative win				
Conservative win				

Tilehurst Ward (five seats)
Party	Candidate	Votes	%	±%
Liberal	Ronald James Day (Jim Day)	2,416		
Liberal	Desmond A. Allen (Des Allen)	2,227		
Liberal	George Henry Ford	2,150		
Liberal	Margaret M. S. McEwen	2,149		
Liberal	Michael Ingrey	2,115		
Conservative	Peter C. Boyce	926		
Conservative	Michael J. Caseley	847		
Conservative	A. J. (Tony) Guy	778		
Labour	David W. Asquith	555		
Labour	Ron J. S. Williams	552		
Labour	Marilyn M. Marshall	549		
Labour	James T. Green	545		
Labour	A. J. Hinder	536		
Liberal win				
Liberal win				
Liberal win				
Liberal win				
Liberal win				

Whitley Ward (three seats)
Party	Candidate	Votes	%	±%
Labour	Jack Price	1,094		
Labour	Doris Ellen Lawrence	1,059		
Labour	Herbert Williams (Bert Williams)	1,045		
Independent	Barbara Morrison	743		
Independent	Roy Giles	700		
Labour win				
Labour win				
Labour win				

== By-elections 1973–1976 ==
Whitley By-Election 11 December 1975
Party	Candidate	Votes	%	±%
Labour	Mike Orton	1,038	48.5	
Conservative	Gladys Matthews	720	33.7	
Liberal	Keith Townsend	382	17.9	
Majority		317	14.8	
Turnout		2,139	31	
Labour hold		Swing		

The Whitley ward by-election in 1975 was triggered by the resignation of Labour councillor Bert Williams.
